= List of American live-action shorts =

This is a list of short subject film series released by Hollywood studios.

== Columbia ==
- Academy of Motion Pictures Arts & Sciences - one special (1949)
- Alan Mowbray (1941–1942) - 2 two-reelers
- Andy Clyde (1935–1956) - 73 comedy two-reelers
- Animal Cavalcade (1952–1953) - 4 one-reel comedies, much footage recycled from earlier shorts
- Bedtime Stories for Grown-Ups (1929–1932) - 18 one-reelers with Eddie Buzzell
- Ben K. Blake Film Novelty specials: Yoo-Hoo General (1942), My Wife's An Angel (1943) & A Voice Is Born (1947)
- Bert Wheeler (1950–1951) - 2 two-reelers
- Billie Burke (1948) - 2 two-reelers
- Billy Gilbert (1943–1944) - 3 two-reelers
- Broadway Follies (1937–1938) - 5 musical one-reelers directed by Ben K. Blake
- Buster Keaton (1939–1941) - 10 two-reelers
- Candid Microphone (1948–1954) featuring Allen Funt and produced by Ben K. Blake
- Cavalcade of Broadway (1949–1952) - 12 New York nightlife shorts
- Charley Chase (1937–1940) - 20 two-reelers
- Cinescope (1939–1941) - 17 one-reel documentaries including a few travelogues by André de la Varre
- Columbia Star Comedies (those headlining one two-reeler each; these didn’t become long-term series like the Three Stooges or Andy Clyde): Charlie Murray (1935), Franklin Pangborn (1935), Guinn "Big Boy" Williams (1936), Herman Bing (1937), Danny Webb (Special, 1939), Wally Brown & Tim Ryan (together, 1949), Harry Mimo (1953), The Mischief Makers (1954, 1 two-reeler of an Our Gang type series), Girlie Whirls (starring Muriel Landers, 1957)
- Columbia Musical Novelties (1933–1934) - 8 comedy/musical two-reelers, often with dialogue entirely in rhyme.
- Columbia Specials (1936–1944)- about 9, including a Cosmocolor short Fashion Takes a Holiday (1940)
- Columbia Topnotchers (1953–1954) - set of 4 one-reel documentaries
- Columbia Tour (1936–1944) - 32 one-reel travelogues
- Community Sing (1937–1949) - 124 musical sing-a-long shorts, produced by Ben K. Blake after '40
- Court of Human Relations (1936–1937) - 4 dramatic one-reelers produced by TruPictures.
- Eddie Foy Jr. (1945–1951) - 3 two-reelers
- El Brendel (1936–1945) - 19 two-reelers, 2 costarring Harry Langdon and 1 costarring Shemp Howard
- Film Vodvil (1943–1946) - produced by Ben K. Blake
- Fools Who Made History (1939) - pair of dramatic two-reelers
- Football Thrills (1931) - 6 sports-reels
- George Givot and Cliff Nazarro (1943) - 2 two-reelers
- George Sidney and Charles Murray (1934) - 6 comedy two-reelers
- The Glove Slingers (1939–1943) - 12 two-reelers, with Noah Beery, Jr., David Durand, and Bill Henry alternating leads
- Gus Schilling and Richard Lane (1945–1950) - 11 two-reelers
- H. A. Ripley's Minute Mysteries (1933–1934) - 10 one-reelers produced by John Randolph Bray
- Hall Room Boys Photoplays (pre-Columbia: 1919–1923) - before Columbia started, Harry Cohn worked on this series
- Harry Langdon (1934–1945) - 22 comedy two-reelers
- Harry Von Zell (1946–1950) - 8 two-reelers
- Hugh Herbert (1943–1952) - 23 two-reelers
- Joe Besser (1938, 1949–1956) – 1 two-reeler in ’38, followed by 11 more later
- Joe DeRita (1946–1948) - 4 two-reelers
- Laughing with Medbury (1931–1935) - John P. Medbury hosted travelogues (27 total)
- Johnny Downs (1942) - 2 two-reelers
- Johnny Walker International Forum (1941) – 3 two-reelers
- Lambs Club (1933) - 8 comedies showcasing members
- Leon Errol (1933–1934) - 5 comedy two-reelers
- Life's Last Laughs (1934–1935) - 6 one-reel spoofs on epitaphs
- Max Baer and Maxie Rosenbloom (1950–1952) - 4 two-reelers
- Monkeyshines (1931) - 5 comedies with an ape cast
- Monty Collins and Tom Kennedy (1935–1938) - 10 two-reelers, plus one with Monty solo (1936). Tom also co-starred with Johnny Arthur in one 1938 two-reeler.
- Music Hall Vanities (1939) - trio of shorts
- Music to Remember (1950) - 6 classical musical performances
- Musical Travelark (1954–1967) - 34 travelogues initially in CinemaScope and all in color. Harry Foster directed several.
- New York Parade (film series) (1940) - pair of documentaries (1940)
- Panoramics (1940–1945) - 14 one-reel documentaries
- Polly Moran (1936–1937) - 2 two-reelers
- Quiz Reel (film series) (1941–1942) - 5 one-reelers
- The Radio Rogues (1935) - 3 two-reelers
- Rambling Reporter travelogue (1930–1931) - 13 one-reelers
- Roscoe Karns (1941) - 2 two-reelers
- Screen Snapshots (C-B-C company: 1920–1924; Columbia: 1924–1958) - series of shorts that looked at the lives of various Hollywood stars
- Shemp Howard (1944–1947) - 9 two-reelers
- Slim Summerville (1943–1944) - 2 two-reelers
- Smith and Dale (1938–1939) - 2 two-reelers
- Special Happy Hour (1937–1939) - 7 one-reelers
- Spice of Life - Literary Digest Jokes (1934–1935) - 7 one-reelers
- Stars of Tomorrow (1935) - 6 one-reelers
- Sterling Holloway (1946–1948) - 6 two-reelers
- Strange as It Seems (1936–1937) - 8 drama/documentary two-reelers produced by the Screen Classics Studio
- Take It or Leave It (1940–1941) - produced by Ben K. Blake
- The Three Stooges (1934–1959) - 190 two-reelers
- Thrills of Music (1946–1949) - 23 big band musicals
- Una Merkel (1943–1944) - 2 two-reelers
- Vera Vague (1943–1952) - 16 two-reelers
- Victor Gems (1929–1930) - 31 short musicals
- Victory Shorts (1942–1944), some by the Office of War Information
- Voice of Experience (1935–1936) - 10 one-reel advice shorts produced by Rex Film and Ben K. Blake
- Wally Vernon and Eddie Quillan (1948–1956) - 16 two-reelers
- Walter Catlett (1934–1940) - 6 comedy two-reelers produced sporadically
- Walter Futter Curiosities (1930–1932) - 28 one-reel documentaries
- The Washington Parade (1938–1941) - 12 one-reelers profiling the capital
- World in Color travelogues (1937–1938) - 5 made in Cinecolor
- World of Sports (1932–1967) – 263+ one-reelers produced by John Randolph Bray in the early years and directed by Jack Kofoed until 1939, when Harry Foster took over. Most were in black and white prior to the sixties.
- Columbia also distributed many independent productions, including many imports from the National Film Board of Canada and the award-winning People Soup and Norman Rockwell's World... An American Dream.
- The Learning Corporation of America was mostly owned by Columbia between 1968 and 1975 (although the company continued through the early '90s), being responsible for many short educational films for schools (often 16mm), along with TV specials and theatrical shorts like the award-winning Angel and Big Joe (1975).

== Educational Pictures ==
(Distributed through Fox Film and 20th Century Fox, 1932–1938)

- Al Christie Comedies (many two-reelers from 1922–1927)- Paramount took over distribution in 1927
- Andy Clyde Comedies (1932–1934)
- As A Dog Thinks (1933) – canine novelties by Robert C. Bruce
- Baby Burlesks (1932–1933) – juvenile comedies featuring Shirley Temple
- Battle for Life (1932–1934) – nature documentaries made by Horace & Stacy Woodard, including award winning City of Wax
- Bill Cunningham Sports Review (1931–1932)
- Cameo Comedies (1922–1932) – one-reelers with Jimmie Adams, Virginia Vance, Cliff Bowes, Eddie Barry, Sidney Smith, Phil Dunman, George Davis, Monte Collins, Jack Lloyd, Wallace Lupino, Gene Stone, William Dale and others. Sound added 1929.
- Campbell Comedies (1921–1922) – two-reelers
- Cannibals of the Deep (1931–1932) - Mack Sennett produced fishing reels
- Charles Bowers Comedies (1927–1928) – trick comedies (some with stop-motion animation)
- C. L. Chester “Chester-Outings” and “Chester Screenics” (1919–1921) – travelogues, also comedies with a chimpanzee Snooky
- Clyde Cook Comedies (1924) – two-reel
- Col. Stoopnagle’s Cavalcade Of Stuff (1938) – pair of spoof documentaries with Stoopnagle and Budd
- Coronet Comedies (1929–1936) – assorted two-reelers, earliest with Edward Everett Horton, later with Charles Judels, Buster West, Tom Howard, Tom Patricola, Vince Barnett & Billy Gilbert. Produced in last years by Al Christie.
- Dorothy Devore Comedies (1927–1929) – two-reelers
- Educational Musical Comedies (1934–1938) – two-reelers featuring Niela Goodelle, Harry Gribbon and early appearances by Bob Hope, The Ritz Brothers, Imogene Coca, Danny Kaye and June Allyson. Al Christie produced many of these.
- Frolics of Youth (1933–1935) – two-reel comedies with Frank Coghlin Jr. and others
- Gags & Gals (1936–1938) – two-reel cartoonist comedies produced by Al Christie with Jefferson Machamer
- Gayety Comedies (1930–1931) with Johnny Hines and Ford Sterling. Produced by Al Christie.
- Harry Langdon Comedies (1932–1933) – two-reelers
- Helena Smith Dayton (1917) – made a claymation short, co-produced by the SS Film Company
- Hodge Podge (film series) (1922–1933, sound added after 1929) – part-live-action travelogue, part animated cartoon (including claymation), initially utilizing footage collected by Lyman H. Howe
- Hollywood Girls Comedies (1930–1932) – two-reelers, some directed by Fatty Arbuckle
- Hollywood on Parade (1934) – pair of Louis Lewyn produced documentaries. Paramount also produced these.
- Hope Hampton Technicolor Specials (1925–1927) - fashion reels
- Ideal Comedies (1927–1929, with sound: 1930–1932) – two reelers with Clem Beauchamp, Al St. John & others
- Jack White Talking Comedies (1929–1930, 1933) – two-reelers. Milton Berle appeared in one of the last.
- James A. Fitzpatrick Sing-alongs (1926) - with Peggy Shaw
- Joe Rock Special: Krakatoa (1933)
- Johnny Walker Novelties (1932) – one-reel series “Great Hokum Mystery” and “Do You Remember?”
- Juvenile Comedies (1922–1929) – two-reelers with Malcolm Sebastian appearing in later ones dubbed Big Boy-Juvenile
- Larry Semon Comedies co-produced by Chadwick (1924–1927)
- Leon Britol Special: War In China (1932)
- Living Book of Nature (1917) – animal reels
- Lloyd Hamilton Comedies (1923-1929, with sound 1929–1931) – two-reelers
- Lupino Lane Comedies (1925–1929, sound added to last batch) – two-reelers
- Mack Sennett Sound Comedies (1928–1932) with Andy Clyde, Johnny Burke, Marjorie Beebe, Daphne Pollard, Billy Bevan, Harry Gribbon, Dorothy Granger, and Bing Crosby Musicals (1931–1932). A few in Naturalcolor
- Marriage Wows (1934) – two-reelers produced by Al Christie
- Mermaid Comedies (1920–1929; sound: 1929–1934) – two-reelers with Lloyd Hamilton (before starting his own series), Jimmie Adams, Lige Conley, Louise Fazenda, Sidney Smith, Virginia Vance, Al St. John, George Davis, Clem Beauchamp, Phil Dunham and Monte Collins. Sound comedies featured Franklin Pangborn, Eddie Lambert, Tom Howard, and Harry Langdon.
- Mirthquake Comedies (1935–1937) – two-reelers with Tom Howard, Tim Ryan & Irene Ryan Produced by Al Christie
- Moran and Mack Comedies (1933) – two-reelers
- Operalogue (1932–1933) – two-reel musicals
- “Our World Today” Kinograms (1928–1929)
- Pat Dowling’s “Camera Adventures” (1932–1933) – nature reels
- Robert C. Bruce Series (documentary shorts): Scenics (1920–1922, 1926–1927), Wilderness Tales (1922–1924) & Outdoor Sketches (1927–1928)
- Romance Productions (1926) – in color
- Romantic Journey (1931–1934) - Howard Brown and Curtis Nagel produced travelogues in Multicolor
- Screen Star Comedies / Star Personality Comedies / Top-Notch Comedies (1933–1937) were “umbrella” titles for two reelers featuring Bert Lahr, Buster Keaton, Joe Cook, Buster West, Charles Kemper, Tim Herbert, Pat Rooney Jr., Willie Howard and Ernest Truex. Many produced by Al Christie
- Sisters of the Skillet (1936–1937) - two-reelers produced by Al Christie
- Song & Comedy Hits (1935–1938) – one-reel musicals produced by Al Christie
- Song Hit Story (1932–1935) – one-reel musicals
- Spirit of the Campus (1932–1933) – one-reel musicals produced by Larry Kent
- Stereoscopiks (3D films, 1922–1925) - produced by Frederic Eugene Ives & Jacob Leventhal
- Tom Howard Comedies (1932–1933) – two-reel
- Toonerville Trolley (1921–1922) - live-action comedies. (Not to be confused with the animated version produced later by Amadee J. Van Beuren.)
- Torchy Series (1921–1922, 1931–1933) – silent comedies with Johnny Hines and two-reel comedies with sound with Ray Cook, Edmund Breese, Franklin Pangborn and others.
- Treasure Chest (1933–1938) – documentaries and musical shorts, mostly one-reel
- Tuxedo Comedies (1923–1929; with sound: 1929–1931, 1935–1936) – two reelers with Ned Spears, Al St. John, Poodles Hanneford, Johnny Arthur, Wallace Lupino, Raymond McKee, Lloyd Hamilton, Tim Ryan, Irene Ryan, Buster West and Tom Patricola
- Vanity Comedies (1930–1932) – two-reelers with Bobby Vernon, Buster West, Vernon Dent, Billy Bevan and others
- Walter Futter’s Curiosities (1926–1928) - documentary novelties
- William J. Burns Detective (1930–1931) – one-reel dramas
- World Wanderings (1921–1922) – travelogues
- Young Romance Comedies (1935–1936) - two-reelers produced by Al Christie
- Zit’s Comedy (1923)

== First National ==
- Buster Keaton (1921–1923)
- Charlie Chaplin (1918–1923)
- Mack Sennett Comedies (1918, 1921–1922) – featuring Ben Turpin, Marie Prevost, Billy Bevan, Louise Fazenda & others
- Toonerville Trolley (1920–1921) with Dan Mason

== Fox Film and 20th Century Fox ==
- Academy of Motion Pictures Arts & Sciences (1949–1950) – 2 one-reelers in black and white.
- Adventures of the Newsreel Cameraman (1933–1942) – documentary series
- Al St. John Comedies (two-reel, silent 1921–1924)
- America Speaks (1942–1943) – wartime shorts. In addition, there were Office of War Information specials and imports from the Ministry of Information (United Kingdom).
- Arthur Houseman Comedies (two-reel, silent 1926–1927)
- Charles "Chic" Sale Comedies (silent & sound: 1927–1928)
- Clark and McCullough Comedies (sound: 1928–1929)
- CinemaScope Movietone Adventures / CinemaScope Specials (1953–1964) - initially 112 shorts produced, starting with orchestra performances by Alfred Newman (composer) and the coronation of Queen Elizabeth II, but later mostly travelogues. Two sub-series were often packaged under the same heading: “Movietone Assignment” (12 released 1957–1961) and Movietone’s "Amazing, But True" (3 made in 1962).
- Fashion Forecast (1938–1940) – 8 Technicolor shorts
- Father Hubbard Adventures with Bernard Rosecrans Hubbard (1933 special, 1939–1945) – 13 travelogues filmed in Alaska mostly, both black and white and later Cinecolor
- Fox Animal Comedies (two reel, silent 1926–1928) featuring many apes, kangaroos, lions… and humans.
- Fox Varieties (one-reel, silent 1923–1928) – travelogue series
- Fox Movietone Acts (all sound: 1928–1929) include a couple featurette three-reelers like John Ford’s Napoleon's Barber (1928) but mostly one-reelers with Raymond McKee, Mark Sandrich, Will Mahoney, Hugh Herbert, Joe Cook, Lionel Atwell, Robert Benchley, Allan Lane, and a series of musical acts often directed by Marcel Silver
- Grandeur Special (1930) - covers Niagara Falls in both sound and wide-screen
- Hallam Cooley Comedies (silent 1925–1926) - two-reelers
- Immortals of the Canvas (1952) – famous paintings in Technicolor (7 shorts, including Light in the Window: The Art of Vermeer)
- Imperial Comedy (two-reel, silent 1923–1928) featured Nick Stuart, Eddie Clayton, Gene Camero, Marjorie Beebe, Richard Walling and others
- Lew Lehr “Kindergarten” & “Dribble Puss Parade” (1938–1948) - 22 shorts, 2 in color
- Lupino Lane Comedies (two-reel, silent 1922)
- Magic Carpet of Fox Movietone (1931–1944) – the first travelogue series to use on-location sound, although narration was also used at times. Shot in either Cinecolor and Technicolor after 1939. Also known as “Along the Royal Road to Romance on the Magic Carpet” (1934–1938 period).
- The March of Time (distributed from 1942–1951, re-issued until 1963)
- Movie Tintype (1933–1934) – silent film compilations
- Movietone Adventure (1943–1950, 1960–1964) – 67 travelogues, many (but not all) in Technicolor. Second set in Cinemascope Deluxe Color.
- Movietone Melodies (1949–1950) – five big band reels in black & white. Later added a special Movietone Musical in color featuring Tommy Dorsey (1961)
- Movietone News (1927–1963) – first newsreel with sound, along with 20+ Specials (1931–1955), “See It Now” (9 newsreel compilations 1953–1955) and 8 “Timely Topics” specials (1959–1964)
- Movietone Sports Review / Movietone Sports Show (1938–1956, 1959–1963) – 102 shorts (24 in Technicolor) initially. Revived in CinemaScope in 1959 (20 total)
- Mutt and Jeff (1913) - live-action series
- O. Henry Featurettes (two-reel, silent 1925–1927)
- Our Land and People (1947) – 8 travelogue shorts in black and white
- Slim Summerville Unreel News (one-reel, silent 1923–1924)
- Sunshine Comedies (two-reel, silent 1916–1925) featured Jimmie Adams, Billie Ritchie, Jack Cooper, Harry Gribbon, Harry Sweet, Hank Mann, Jane Lee, Katherine Lee, Glen Cavender, Slim Summerville, Clyde Cook, Edgar Kennedy, Sidney Smith, Lee Moran, Ruth Hiatt, Chester Conklin, Oliver Hardy and others
- Tom Mix Westerns (two & three-reel, silent 1917–1918, 1922)
- 20th Century Fox "specials" include Technicolor The Coronation of King George IV and Queen Elizabeth (1937), Ripley's Believe It or Not! short Acquitted by the Sea (1940), plus a dozen more between 1944–1958, including Why Korea? (1950), Holy Pilgrimage (1950) and The Word (1953, featuring Dr Frank C. Laubach in New Guinea).
- Van Bibber Comedies (two-reel, silent 1924–1928) featured Earle Foxe, Florence Gilbert and Tyler Brooke
- The World of Fashion: Yesterday, Today and Tomorrow (1968) - featurette
- The World Today (1941–1949) – 20 documentaries, followed by a trio focused on women’s issues called “Feminine World”

== Hal Roach ==
(Distributed by Pathé Exchange, 1914–1928, and MGM, 1927–1938)

- All-Star Comedies (1925–1927) featuring Charles Murray, Lucien Littlefield, Theda Bara, Stan Laurel, Tyler Brooke, Lillian Roth and others
  - Anita Garvin and Marion Byron (1928–1929) - 3 two-reelers
  - The Boy Friends (1930–1932) - 15 shorts starring Mickey Daniels, Grady Sutton, David Sharpe, and Mary Kornman
  - Edgar Kennedy (1929) - 3 two-reelers
  - Harry Langdon (1929–1930) - 8 two-reelers
  - James Finlayson (1925) - 6 two-reelers
  - The Taxi Boys (1932–1933) - 10 two-reelers, mostly with Billy Gilbert and Ben Blue
- All-Star Specials (1933–1935) featuring Billy Gilbert, Eddie Foy Jr., Douglas Wakefield, Billy Nelson, Phyllis Barry and others
  - The Schmaltz Brothers (1933–1934) - 3 two-reelers starring Billy Gilbert and Billy Bletcher
- Arthur Stone (1924–1925) - 12 two-reelers
- Beatrice La Plante (1920) - 5 one-reelers
- Charley Chase (1924–1936, sound after 1929) - 108 shorts, ranging from one to three reels
- Clyde Cooke (1924–1926) - 8 two-reelers
- Dippy Dood-Dads (1923–1924) – 14 one-reelers featuring monkeys and dogs
- Eddie Boland (1921–1922, 1925) - 13 one-reelers
- Fite / Hunky Dory (1923–1925) - 9 one-reelers featuring Earl Mohan & Billy Engle
- Gaylord Lloyd (1921) - 5 one-reelers
- "Crosseyed Slim" (George Rowe) (1922) - 1 one-reeler
- George Whiting Series (1915)
- Glenn Tryon (1924–1925) - 21 two-reelers and 2 features
- Harold Lloyd (1915–1921) - 177 shorts, ranging from one to three reels. Originally headed the "Willie Work" series in 1915, then the "Lonesome Luke" series through 1917, later moving into feature films until 1923
- Irvin S. Cobb (1934) - 4 two-reelers
- Laurel and Hardy (1927–1935) - 62 shorts ranging from two to four reels. Originally part of the "All-Star" series. The most famous comedy team mostly appeared in short films initially, but also made 13 features for Hal Roach from 1931 to 1940.
- Mabel Normand (1926) - 5 three-reelers
- Max Davidson (1926–1927) - 17 two-reelers
- Our Gang (1922–1938) - 168 comedy shorts and one feature film produced. Hal Roach later sold the series to MGM, which continued filming new titles with the cast through 1943.
- “Paul” James Parrott (1921–1923) - 67 one-reelers
- Skinny (Dee Lampton) (1916–1917) - 9 shorts ranging from five to ten minutes
- Snub Pollard (1918–1926) - 135 shorts ranging from one to two reels
- Stan Laurel (solo) (1918–1919, 1923–1924) - 30 shorts ranging from one to two reels
- Sunshine Sammy (1921) - 1 two-reeler
- The Spat Family (1923–1925) – 24 two-reelers starring Frank Butler, Sidney D'Albrook & Laura Roessing
- Toto (1917–1918) – 16 shorts ranging from one to two reels. Featuring Arnold Novello
- Vanity Fair Girls (1920–1921) – 14 one-reelers. Featuring Eddie Boland
- Will Rogers (1922–1924) - 14 two-reelers
- ZaSu Pitts and Thelma Todd (1931–1933) - 16 shorts ranging from two to three reels
  - Thelma Todd and Patsy Kelly (1933–1936) - 21 two-reelers
  - Patsy Kelly and Pert Kelton (1936) - 1 two-reeler
  - Patsy Kelly and Lyda Roberti (1936) - 2 two-reelers and one feature

== Mack Sennett ==
- (for Keystone Studios-Mutual Film Corporation: 1912–1915) – featuring Marie Dressler, Mabel Normand, Roscoe Arbuckle, Ford Sterling, Al St. John, Mack Swain, Chester Conklin and others. (Several featured in the Keystone Cops). Charlie Chaplin started with Sennett in 1913, later heading his own series for Essanay Studios in 1914–1915 and Mutual Film Corporation in 1916–1917.
- (for Keystone Studios-Triangle Film Corporation: 1915–1918) – Chester Conklin, Mabel Normand, Roscoe Arbuckle, Raymond Hitchcock, Polly Moran, Mae Busch, Syd Chaplin, Louise Fazenda, Ben Turpin, Gloria Swanson, Billy Bevan, Charlie Murray, Hank Mann, Harry Gribbon and others
- (for Keystone Studios-Pathé Exchange, 1918)
- (for Paramount: 1917–1921) - featuring Ben Turpin, Gloria Swanson, Mack Swain, Chester Conklin, Louise Fazenda, Slim Summerville, Cliff Bowes, Harry Gribbon, Eddie Gribbon, Billy Armstrong, Billy Bevan, Charlie Murray, Marie Prevost, Bert Roach, Ford Sterling and others.
- (for First National: 1918, 1921–1922) – featuring Ben Turpin, Marie Prevost, Billy Bevan, Louise Fazenda & others
- (for Pathé Exchange)
  - Alice Day (1925–1927)
  - All-Star Comedies (1923–1928) –featuring Harry Gribbon, Mildred June, Sidney Smith, Jack Cooper, Eddie Quinlin, Ruth Taylor, Andy Clyde, Madeline Hurlock, Irving Bacon, Oliver Hardy and others
  - Ben Turpin (1923–1927)
  - Billy Bevan (1923–1928, sound with final titles)
  - Campus Comedies (1928) – featuring Daphne Pollard and Carole Lombard
  - Harry Langdon (1924–1926)
  - Ralph Graves (1924–1926)
  - The Smiths (1926–1928) – featuring Raymond McKee, Ruth Hiatt and Mary Ann Jackson
- (sound comedies for Educational Pictures: 1928–1932) with Andy Clyde, Johnny Burke, Marjorie Beebe, Daphne Pollard, Billy Bevan, Harry Gribbon, Dorothy Granger, and Bing Crosby Musicals (1931–1932). Documentary series: “Cannibals of the Deep”
- (sound comedies for Paramount: 1932–1933) - featuring Franklin Pangborn, Mack Swain, Ben Turpin, Marjorie Beebe, Lloyd Hamilton, Daphne Pollard, Donald Novis, Charlie Murray, Eddie Gribbon, Billy Gilbert, Walter Catlett and W. C. Fields

== Metro Pictures ==
- Buster Keaton (1920–1921)
- Bull Montana (1922–1923)
- Mr. and Mrs. Sidney Drew (1916–1919)
- Rolma Films (1916–1918) with a variety of stars like Mack Swain and Billy Quirk
- Screen Classics series (1920)
- Stan Laurel Comedies (1922–1923)

== Metro-Goldwyn-Mayer ==
- Academy of Motion Pictures Arts & Sciences (1950) – 3 one-reelers in black and white
- Around the World with Burton Holmes (1930–1931) – 12 one-reel travelogues
- CinemaScope Specials (1953–1956) – approximately 8, early ones were orchestra performances led by Johnny Green. Also The Battle of Gettysburg (1955 film)
- Colortone Musical (1929–1935) - 17 one and two reel musicals in Technicolor, utilizing the full rainbow process from mid-1934.
- Colortone Revue (1929–1930) – 5 black and white (but sepia tone released) comedies, two with Jack Benny.
- Crime Does Not Pay (1935–1947) - 49 two-reel dramatic shorts
- Dogville Comedies (1929–1931) - nine short parodies of feature films enacted by dogs, also known as All-Barkies.
- FitzPatrick Traveltalks (1931–1953) – travelogues initially released independently in the late twenties, but approximately 221 one-reelers for MGM. In full Technicolor starting in 1934.
- Hal Roach Comedies (distributed between 1927 and 1938)
- Herbert Kalmus Great Events (silent, 1927–1929) – 12 two-reelers produced in 2-color Technicolor, costumed recreations of famous events from Betsy Ross to Cleopatra.
- Historical Mysteries (1937–1938) – 11 one reel docu-shorts narrated by Carey Wilson and John Nesbitt
- Louis Lewyn Galaxy of Stars (1934–1937) – 7 Technicolor two-reelers featuring many familiar faces. Also a few “MGM Miniatures” in black & white later followed the same model.
- MGM Movietone Acts (1928–1930) - 82 one-reelers spotlighting various comedy and musical acts in sound
- MGM Oddities/MGM Miniatures (1-reel, 1932–1946, 1951–1955) – about 115+ documentaries and comedy shorts running less than 11 minutes in length. Term “Oddity” replaced by “Miniature” by 1935. Early “Oddities” narrated by Pete Smith (two in color) and later Carey Wilson. Charles "Chic" Sale appeared in some mid-thirties entries. Also a series profiling Nostradamus.
- MGM Musical Revue (1933–1934) – 9 two-reelers including some Three Stooges in early Technicolor
- MGM 2-Reel Special (1927–1929, 1931, 1933–1945) - includes a documentary 24 Dollar Island directed by Robert Flaherty, also Jackie Cooper special (1931), followed by a more consistently released series starting in 1935, often musicals.
- Martin Block Musical Merry-Go-Round (1947–1948) – 6 total
- Office of War Information & War Activities Committee Specials (1941–1943)
- Our Gang (1938–1944) 52 shorts; taken over from Hal Roach.
- The Passing Parade (1938–1949) - 73 strange-but-true stories narrated by John Nesbitt.
- Pete Smith series (1931–1955)
  - Fisherman's Paradise (6 sports-reels, 1 in early Technicolor, 1931–1932)
  - Sports Champions / Sports Parade (36 one-reelers, 1931–1936)
  - Goofy Movies (10 one-reel spoofs edited from various silent film clips, 1933–1934)
  - 3D film Specials (3 made in 1935, ’37 & ’40)
  - Specialties (214 live-action documentary/comedies 1935–1955, at least 18 in color. Dave O'Brien appeared in many ‘40s and ‘50s comedy titles)
- Robert Benchley Comedies (1935–1940; 1943–1944) – 30 one reelers
- Romance of Celluloid (1937–1944) – behind the scenes documentaries
- Spotlight on the World We Live In (1951) – newsreel series made by Gordon Films
- Stop Look and Listen (film) (1967)
- Tabloid Musical (1936–1937) – 7 one-reelers, including the famous Every Sunday
- Theater of Life (1946–1948) – 4 two-reel documentaries co-produced by the Associated Press
- UFA “Oddity” (1927–1929) – 43 imported from Germany silent documentaries

== Paramount ==
- Al Christie Comedies (two-reel, silent 1927–1929, sound 1929–1930) featuring Edward Everett Horton, Bill Dooley, Bobby Vernon, Neal Burns, Jack Duffy, Jimmie Adams, Billy Engle, Harold Conklin, Ann Cornwall, Madge Kennedy, Andy Clyde, Frances Lee, Jason Robards Sr., Spencer Williams, Louise Fazenda, Johnny Arthur, Dot Farley, Buster West, Taylor Holmes, Lois Wilson and others.
- Al St. John Comedies (two-reel, silent 1920)
- Bing Crosby (1932–1934)- musical two-reelers produced by Mack Sennett and later Arvid E. Gillstrom
- Broadway Highlights (1935–1936)
- Burton Holmes Travel Pictures (1914–1922)
- Carter DeHaven Comedies (1919–1920)
- Color Cruises (1936–1939) one-reel travelogues in Cinecolor, produced by Palmer Miller and Curtis Nagel
- Comique Comedies (1917–1920) featuring Fatty Arbuckle and Buster Keaton
- Days of Real Sport by Briggs (1919) directed by John William Kelette
- Frederick Burlingham Adventures / Travel Pictures (1919–1920) - travelogues
- Fredrick Feher Symphonic Series (1938–1939)
- Grantland Rice “Sports Eye-View” and “Sportlights” (1932–1956)
- Hedda Hopper’s Hollywood (1941–1942)
- Here’s Homer (1967–1968) - Homer Groening produced comedies
- High Topper Special (1961–1965) - umbrella title for assorted documentary shorts
- Hollywood on Parade (1932–1934), produced by Louis Lewyn
- James A. Fitzpatrick Melody Masters (1929)
- James Montgomery Flagg Comedies (1918–1919)
- Leslie Winik sports-reels (1960–1968), sometimes co-produced with Sports Illustrated
- Mack Sennett Comedies (distributed by Paramount: 1917–1921) Featuring Ben Turpin, Gloria Swanson, Mack Swain, Chester Conklin, Louise Fazenda, Slim Summerville, Cliff Bowes, Harry Gribbon, Eddie Gribbon, Billy Armstrong, Billy Bevan, Charlie Murray, Marie Prevost, Bert Roach, Ford Sterling and others.
- Mack Sennett Sound Comedies (1932–1933) featuring Franklin Pangborn, Mack Swain, Ben Turpin, Marjorie Beebe, Lloyd Hamilton, Daphne Pollard, Donald Novis, Charlie Murray, Eddie Gribbon, Billy Gilbert, Walter Catlett and W. C. Fields
- Mr. and Mrs. Sidney Drew VBK Comedies (two-reel, silent 1918–1919)
- Musical Romance (1935–1937) - musical specials
- Pacemaker (film series) (1946–1955) one-reel comedies and documentaries
- Paramount Varieties (later renamed “Paragraphics”) (1934–1943) – one reel documentaries
- Paramount Headliners (1933–1943, 1946) - jazz and big band reels directed mostly by Fred Waller and Leslie Roush
- Paramount News (1927, sound added ’29, through 1957), in addition to specials
- Paramount One Reel Acts (1928–1933) shot at the Astoria facilities in New York and featuring Ruth Etting, Fanny Brice, Rudy Vallée, Eddie Cantor, Donald Ogden Stewart, Smith & Dale, Fred Allen, Lillian Roth, Tom Howard, after 1930: George Burns, Gracie Allen, Ethel Merman, Jack Benny, Solly Ward, Lulu McConnell, Havana Casino Orchestra, Eugene Howard, Marion Harris, George Dewey Washington, Louis Armstrong, Boswell Sisters, Cary Grant (one short), Vincent Lopez and many others who also appeared in Vitaphone shorts for Warner Brothers during the same period.
- Paramount Pictographs (later “Paramount Magazine”) (1916–1921) – featured live-action travelogue and human interest subject matter, with animated cartoon segments produced by either John Randolph Bray or Pat Sullivan.
- Paramount Pictorials (1930–1939) – one-reel documentaries with three or four separate topics resembling a newsreel. Sometimes these included scenes in Technicolor
- Paramount Specials (silent era) included such titles as Truckee, California Stages the First Sweepstake Dog Race Outside of Alaska (1915), 100% American (1918), Oh Judge! How Could You? (1919), Night of the Dub (1919) and a pair of studio promotionals (1922 & 1927).
- Paramount Specials (sound era) (1932–1951) – at least nine were made, including Hollywood Extra Girl with Cecil B. DeMille and The Fashion Side of Hollywood with Josef von Sternberg.
- Paramount Travel Adventures (or “Paramount Treasury of Travels”) (1964–1968)
- Paramount Two Reel Acts (1928–1933) shot at the Astoria facilities in New York and featuring Helen Hayes, Humphrey Bogart (one film), Walter Houston, Lorenz Hart, Richard Rodgers, Tom Howard, Billy House, after 1930: George Jessel, Victor Moore, Jack Benny, Karl Dane, George K. Arthur, Al St. John, Ford Sterling and others.
- Phil L. Ryan Comedies featuring Chester Conklin (1930–1931), Walter Catlett, Eugene Pallette, Harry Langdon, and Leon Errol (all 1933–1934)
- Popular Science (1935–1949) – color science and technology newsreels produced by Jerry Fairbanks and Robert Carlisle
- Post Nature Picture (1918–1920) credited to W.A. Van Scoy
- Quiz Kids (1941–1942) – Cinecolor educational one-reelers hosted by Joe Kelly
- Robert Benchley Comedies (1940–1942)
- Robert C. Bruce Scenics (1929–1931)
- Screen Souvenirs (1932–1936)
- Son of Democracy (1917–1918), credited to Benjamin Chapin
- Speaking of Animals (1941–1949) – animal comedies (live-action, but often with animated mouths) produced by Jerry Fairbanks
- The Star Reporter (1936–1938) – four behind-the-scenes specials
- Technicolor Musical Parade (1943–1948) – all two-reels
- Topper Special (1951–1956) – one-reel documentaries
- Unusual Occupations (1937–1949) color documentaries from Jerry Fairbanks
- Victor Moore Comedies (two-reel, silent 1916–1917)
- Victory Shorts – wartime documentaries (1942–1944) under War Activities Committee of the Motion Pictures Industry
- VistaVision Specials (1954–1957) includes Williamsburg: the Story of a Patriot and travelogue “VistaVision Visits”, sometimes produced by James A. Fitzpatrick
- Wild Men of Africa (1921): four films edited from a featurette of Leonard J. Vandenbergh

== Pathé Exchange ==
Company merged with RKO in 1931.

- Adventures of Bill & Bob (1920–1922)
- Benny Rubin Comedies (1930–1931)
- Chronicles of America (1923–1924)
- Edgar Jones Westerns (1921)
- Fred H. Kiser Industrial Films (1922–1923)
- Grantland Rice's Sportlight (1923–1933) and “Football Sense” (1927)
- Hal Roach comedies (distributor, 1914–1927)
- Harvard University Department of Geology (1928–1929)
- Henry & Polly (1927) with Leah Baird and Taylor Holmes
- Hugh Wiley’s Wildcat (1929–1930) with Ford Washington Lee and John William Sublett
- Indian Frontier (1924) with Ed Brady
- James A. Fitzpatrick Famous Melodies (1926)
- Johnny Jones (1922) featuring Edward Peil Jr.
- Knute Rockne sports-reels (1930)
- Mack Sennett comedies (distributor, 1923–1929)
- Major Allen’s Safari (1921)
- Monty Banks shorts and features (1927–1930)
- On Guard with Arch Heath (1927)
- Pathé Novelty (1922–1928) – umbrella title for assorted documentaries and specials
- Pathé Review (silent version, 1919–1930, sound version called “Pathé Audio Review”, 1929–1933) - multi-subject shorts made on an average of 52 per year, usually with one or two segments in color (often stenciled).
- Pathé Sound Comedies (1929–1932) known by different sub-titles: Campus Comedies, Capitol Comedies, Checker Comedies, E. B. Derr Comedies, Follies, George Le Maire Comedies, Golden Roosters, Manhattan Comedies, Melody Comedies, Rainbow Comedies, Rodeo Comedies, Rufftown Comedies, Smitty & His Pals, Variety Comedies and Whoopee Comedies. These featured Nat Carr, Daphne Pollard, Edgar Kennedy, James Gleason, William Frawley, Harry Watson Jr., Reginald Merville, Franklyn Pangborn and Dot Farley
- Range Rider Westerns (1922–1923) starring Leo D. Maloney
- Rarebits (1927–1928) produced by Record Pictures
- Raymond L. Ditmars Nature Reels (1912–1915). He also made segments for the Pathé Review.
- Smitty & His Pals (1928–29) - 2 reel comedies produced by Amadee J. Van Beuren
- Song Sketches (1930) directed by Oscar Lund and produced by Amadee J. Van Beuren
- Sound Topics of the Day (1929–1930) directed by Alfred T. Mannon and produced by Amadee J. Van Beuren
- Stereoscopiks (1925) – 3D film experiments produced by Frederic Eugene Ives and Jacob Leventhal
- Tom Santschi Westerns (1921)
- Topics of the Day (for Timely Prod., 1919–1929) produced by Amadee J. Van Beuren
- Travelesque (1927–1928) featuring Will Rogers
- True Detective Stories (1924)
- Vagabond Adventure (1930–1931, for RKO-Pathé: 1931–1937) - travelogues produced by Amadee J. Van Beuren
- Walter Futter Curiosities (1928–1929) produced by Amadee J. Van Beuren
- World Geography (1927–1928) produced by Duncan Underbill

== Republic ==
- Land of Opportunity (1949–1950) – four documentaries
- Meet the Stars (1940–1941) – 11 one-reelers
- This World of Ours (1950–1955) – Carl Dudley produced Trucolor travelogues
- Trucolor Specials (1956)

== RKO ==
(These do not include the Pathé shorts listed above)

- Academy of Motion Pictures Arts & Sciences – 3 shorts (1948–1950)
- Amadee J. Van Beuren productions for RKO-Pathé (post–1931):
  - Dumb-Bell Letters (1934–1936)
  - Easy Aces (1935–1936) featuring the popular radio duo Goodman Ace and Jane Ace
  - Floyd Gibbons Supreme Thrills (1931)
  - Golf with Johnny Farrell (1931)
  - The Last Frontier (1932) – western series
  - Liberty Short Story (1931) – courtroom dramas
  - Magna Productions (1933–1934), featuring big name stars like Bert Lahr and Ethel Waters.
  - Miniatures (1931)
  - Sports with Bill Corum (1935–1937)
  - Struggle to Live (1935–1937) – nature reels by Horace & Stacy Woodard
  - True Detective Stories (1931–1932) with Walter Miller as Nick Harris.
  - Vagabond Adventure / retitled “World on Parade” after 1935 (1930–1937) - travelogues
- The Blondes and the Redheads (1933–1935)
- Broadway Headliners (later simply “Headliners”) (1931–1938), musical-comedies with W. C. Fields, Clark and McCullough, Ruth Etting, Ted Fio Rito, Tom Kennedy, Gene Austin, Betty Grable, Jack Norton and Phil Harris.
- Charles "Chic" Sale (1931–1932)
- Clark and McCullough (1931–1935)
- Condor Musicals (1937) – 3 produced in New York
- Edgar Kennedy Comedies (a.k.a. “Mr. Average Man”) (1931–1948) (see also Pathé list above)
- Ely Culbertson My Bridge Experiences (1933)
- Famous Jury Trials (1942) – dramas directed by J. H. Lenauer
- Flicker Flashbacks (1943–1948) – silent film collections compiled by Richard Fleischer
- Four Star Comedies (1932–1935) with Tom Kennedy, Harry Gribbon, Harry Sweet, Walter Catlett and Chick Chandler.
- Frank McHugh Comedies (1931–1932)
- Gay Girl Comedies (1931–1932)
- Gil Lamb Comedies (1949–1953)
- Gramercy Series (1929–1930) – musical acts including Duke Ellington and Bessie Smith
- Pal (1946–1950) – dog dramas featuring Gary Gray
- Humanettes (1930–1931) – series of 12 shorts featuring vaudeville and music acts with human stars' heads atop doll bodies
- Information Please (1939–1942) – film adaptation of the radio series
- Larry Darmour and Standard Cinema provided F.B.O. and later RKO with 2-reel comedies:
  - Barney Google (1928–1929)
  - H.C. Witwer Record Breakers (1929–1930) featuring Albert Vaughn, Al Cook & George Gray
  - Karl Dane and George K. Arthur Comedies (1930–1931)
  - Louise Fazenda Comedies with Max Davidson in support (1930–1931)
  - Mickey McGuire (1927–1933) starring Mickey Rooney
  - Toots and Casper (1928–1929) with Thelma Hill & Bud Duncan
- Leon Errol Comedies (1934–1951)
- Major Bowes Theatre of the Air (1935–1936) with Edward Bowes made at Biograph Studios and adapted from Major Bowes Amateur Hour
- March of Time (distributor, 1935–1942)
- The Masquers Club (1931–1933)
- Ned Sparks (1931)
- The Newlyweds (RKO series) (1949–1952) with Robert Neil & Suzi Crandall
- Nick & Tony (1930–1931) with Nick Basil and Henry Armetta
- Nu-Atlas Musical (1937–1939) produced in New York by Milton Schwarzwald
- Pathé News (1931–1947)
- Pathé Audio Review (Pathé: 1929–1931, RKO-Pathé: 1931–1933) – see Pathé section for details
- Pathé Topics (1935–1937) – 18 newsreel specials
- Picture People (1940–1942) – behind-the-scenes Hollywood series
- Radio Flash (1935–1940) – assorted comedies featuring Jack Norton, Dot Farley, James Finlayson, Harry Langdon, among others.
- Radio Musical (1935–1939) – 10 two-reelers with Ruth Etting appearing in one.
- Ray Whitley & His Six-Bar Cowboys (1937–1942) – 18 two-reel musicals
- RCA Photophone and Radio Comedies (1929–1932) featuring Nat Carr, Marc Connelly, Jimmy Aubrey and others
- Reelism (1938–1940) – one-reel documentaries produced by Frederic Ullman Jr.
- RKO Jamboree (later renamed “Musical Featurettes”) (1942–43, 1946–48)
- RKO-Pathé Special (1933–1937, 1951–1957) – mostly documentary; second series replaced “This Is America”
- RKO Specials (assorted, 1930–1957) include a 65mm musical Campus Sweethearts (1930), a Robert Benchley Comedy (1934), A Trip Through Fijiland (1935), La Cucaracha (1934 film) and The Boy and the Eagle (1947) both in Technicolor, Conquer by the Clock (1942), The House I Live In (1945), the “Victory Specials” (1942–1943), “Theater Of Life” Specials (1952, 1956) and “Wildlife Album” specials (1955–1957)
- Roscoe Ates (1931)
- Screenliner (1948–1957) – one-reel documentary shorts
- The Smart Set (1935–1937) – comedies with Betty Grable, Jack Norton, Lucille Ball, Billy Gilbert, Tom Kennedy and Ford Sterling
- Sportscopes (1938–1957) – one-reel documentaries on sports
- Superba (1936–1937) – umbrella title for earliest Leon Errol series and two featuring Lew Kelly & Ruth Hiatt
- This Is America (RKO film series) (1942–1951) – two-reel documentaries inspired by March of Time. Replaced by a sporadic release of RKO-Pathé Specials.
- The Traveling Man (1931–1932), starring Louis John Bartels
- Wally Brown and Jack Kirkwood Comedies (1949–1951)
- Walt Disney (distributor of most shorts and features, 1937–1956)

== United Artists ==
- David L. Loew Musicolor shorts (8 one reelers in Cinecolor, 1946–1948)
- W. Lee Wilder Songs of America (16 one-reelers, 1949–1950)
- William Cameron Menzies musical shorts (1929–1930)
- The World in Action (1941–1945) imported from National Film Board of Canada
- World Windows (1938) imported from UK and filmmaker Jack Cardiff
- various independent shorts released between 1954 and 1972

== Universal ==
=== Sound films ===
- Academy of Motion Pictures Arts & Sciences one-reel special 1949
- America Speaks (1942–1943) – 3 one-reel documentaries
- Answer Man (1946–1948) – 15 one-reel documentaries
- Arthur Lake comedies (1928–1930), initially the silent “Horace in Hollywood” two-reel comedies
- Basketball Sports-reels (written by Albert H. Kelley and Samuel Freeman) (1931)
- Benny Rubin (1929) – approximately 7 sound one-reel comedies
- Charlie Murray & George Sidney Comedies (1930–1931) – 11 two-reelers
- Christy Walsh All-America Sportreel (1931–1932) – 15 sports-reels
- Daphne Pollard Comedies (1931–1932) – 4 two-reelers
- Earth and Its People (1947–1949) – 35 two-reel travelogues initially released to schools in 16mm format, theatrically in 35mm in 1952-53.
- Going Places (1934–1941) - 92 travelogues with Lowell Thomas and Graham McNamee (after ’38) narrating. Produced/directed by Allyn Butterfield and Charles E. Ford
- Junior Jewel Comedies (1929–1930) with Snappy and “The Sporting Youth”, including Ann Christy, Sumner Getchell & Joan McCoy
- Juvenile Jury (1946–1947) – 4 quiz novelty reels with Jack Barry (game show host)
- Laemmle Novelties (1928–1929) – first sound series with musical and stage performances. Vernon Dent and Lou Archer appeared together in one.
- Lloyd Hamilton Comedies (1931–1932) – 4 two-reelers
- Louis Sobol (1932–1934) – 4 one and two-reelers
- Mentone Brevity (1933–1939) – 77 variety shorts shot in New York City with many stage performers like Ethel Barrymore, Bill Robinson, Bob Hope, among others.
- Morton Downey in “America's Greatest Composers” (1932–1933) – trio of shorts
- Name Band Musical (1939–1957) – 214 California filmed 15–20 minute shorts showcasing the best in jazz and big band
- Northwest Mounted Police (sound film series) (1929–1930) – two-reelers with Ted Carson
- Pat Rooney (1929) – 6 two-reel comedies
- Person-Oddity (1942–1946) – 48 human interest documentaries (one-reel) produced by Thomas Mead & Joseph O'Brien
- Pioneer Kid (1929–1930) – two-reel westerns with Bobby Nelson, some initially filmed silent with sound dubbed in.
- Red Star Comedy (1930–1932) – approximately 12 two-reelers with an assortment (including Edgar Kennedy, Tom O’Brian, Franklin Pangborn & Jack Duffy)
- Robert Benchley (1933) – one short “Your Technocracy And Mine”
- The Shadow (film series version) (1931–1932) – 6 two-reel fantasy-dramas adapted from the radio show with Arthur Aylesworth
- Sing & Be Happy (1946–1949) – 29 musical one-reelers
- Slim Summerville (1930–1934) – 20 two-reel comedies
- Strange as it Seems (1930–1934) – 39 newsreel oddity-reels much like Believe It Or Not produced by Jerry Fairbanks and Manny Nathan Hahn, adapted from John Hix comics and shown in Multicolor during the first two seasons.
- Stranger Than Fiction (1934–1942) – 110 documentary shorts, successor to Strange As It Seems covering animals, travel and peculiar items of interest. Production by Allyn Butterfield, Thomas Mead and Joseph O’Brien with Charles E. Ford and later Henry Clay Bate as key directors.
- Sunny Jim McKee (1929–1930) – two-reel juvenile comedies
- SuperSpecial Featurettes (1959–1968) – 23 running 20–30 minutes in color
- Syd Saylor Comedies (1930) – 5 two-reelers
- Thalians Club Comedies (1931–1932, 1934) – 5 two-reelers with Franklyn Pangborn and others.
- Universal Brevities & Novelties (1930–1934) – 16 documentary one-reelers
- Universal Color Adventures (1962–1972) – approximately 57 assorted one and two-reel documentaries
- Universal-International Color Parade (1952–1962) – approximately 72 one and two-reel documentaries.
- Universal-International Musical Westerns (1948–1949) - 19 two-reelers featuring Tex Williams and other country singers
- Universal Specials (1930–1958, 1969–1972) – 45 comedy and documentary two-reelers not part of any series, in color by the ‘50s.
- Universal Newsreel (1929–1967), also including a group of annual “Football Highlights” specials (1959–1967)
- Van Ronkel Comedies (1935) – 6 two-reelers mostly with Sterling Holloway
- Variety View (film series) (1941–1958) – 260 documentary one-reelers replacing “Going Places” and produced by Thomas Mead and initially Joseph O'Brien. All in black and white.
- Vernon Dent (1929–1930) – pair of comedies
- Victory Shorts (1942–1944) – 7 documentary one-reelers
- Vistarama Specials (1954–1957) – 9 widescreen Eastmancolor travelogues produced by Carl Dudley
- Warren Doane Comedies (1932–1935) – 46 two-reelers with James Gleason, Louise Fazenda, Sterling Holloway, Henry Armetta and others.
- William Rowland & Monty Brice Featurettes (1932–1933) - 6 two-reel musicals, featuring such acts as Ruth Etting and the Boswell Sisters

=== Silent films (pre-1928) ===
- Arthur Lake “Drugstore Cowboy” Series (1927–1928) – two-reel westerns
- The Battling Cowboy (1924–1925)
- Ben Hall Comedies (1927–1928)
- Bert Roach Comedies (1923–1924)
- Bess the Detectress (1914)
- Big U (Universal) Productions (1914–1917) – both comedies and dramas
- Bison Film Company (1912–1917) co-produced with Universal
- Bluebird Comedy (1925–1927) – one-reelers featuring Neely Edwards, Charles Puffy, Arthur Lake and others. The Bluebird logo also handled occasional special shorts since 1916.
- Bob Curwood Westerns (1927–1928)
- Brunton Comedies (1922) co-produced with Universal
- Bull’s Eye Comedies (1924–1925) – one-reelers featuring Bert Roach, Neely Edwards & Alice Howell
- Century Studios Comedies (1917–1928), co-produced with Universal both one and two-reel comedies featuring Edith Roberts, Jimmie Adams, Alice Howell, the Century Lions (1918–1921), Joe Martin the chimpanzee (1919–1920), Brownie the Dog (1919–1923), Harry Sweet (after 1920), Baby Peggy (after 1921), Lee Moran (1922), Queenie (a horse), Maude (a mule), Buddy Messinger (1923), Pal (a dog, 1923) and Wanda Wiley (1924). The Stern Brothers took over and added other series: The Gumps (with Joe Murphy, Fay Tincher & Jack Morgan, 1923–1928), Buster Brown (with Arthur Trimble & Doreen Turner, 1925–1929), The Excuse Makers (with Wanda Wiley & Charles King, 1926–1927), What Happened To Jane? (1926–1927), Let George Do It (with Syd Saylor, 1926–1929), Newlyweds (with Syd Saylor, Ethlyne Clair, Jack Egan, Derelys Perdue & Sunny Jim McKee, 1926–1929), Keeping Up with the Joneses (1927–1928), Rube Goldberg Mike & Ike (1927–1929) and the assorted Stern Bros. Comedies (1925–1926).
- Champion Boy Rider (1927–1928) – two-reel westerns
- Champion Film Company (1912–1913)
- Charles Puffy Comedies (1928)
- The Collegians (1925–1929) – two-reel comedies made by the Junior Jewel division with George J. Lewis, Eddie Phillips and others. Soundtracks added to the later entries.
- Crystal Films (1912–1914) co-produced with Universal, featuring “Baldy” Joseph Belmont, Vivian Prescott and Pearl White
- Cyclone Smith (1919) – two-reel adventures with Eddie Polo
- Eclair (1912–1915) co-produced with Universal
- Famous Finlay Nature Pictures (1918) – documentaries featuring William L. Finley
- Fast Steppers (1924) – two-reelers
- The Forest Rangers (series) (1928–1929)
- Francis Ford Dramas (1913–1915)- mostly one-reel
- Gem Productions (1912–1913), co-produced with Universal one-reel comedies with Billy Quirk as well as mini-documentaries
- Gold Seal Productions (1913–1917) – ranging from one to three reels, including the “Lord John’s Journal” and “Under the Crescent” series
- Hoot Gibson Westerns (1917–1921, 1926)
- Hysterical History (1924–1925) – mostly one-reel spoofs on history with Slim Summerville, Billy Franey and others.
- IMP (1912–1917) was Universal’s initial flagship company with many comedies, dramas and documentaries, including the “Blinks” series with Charles DeForrest (1913) and some ambitious dramas starring King Baggot.
- Jack Dempsey “Fight & Win” (1924) – two reelers
- Jack London’s “Tales of the Fish Patrol” (1922–1923) – two-reel outdoor adventures with Jack Mulhall, Louise Lorraine and others
- Joker Film (1912–1917) co-produced with Universal many one-reel comedies with an assortment of big names: Grace Cunard, Louise Fazenda, Max Asher, Bobby Vernon, Billy Franey, Ernest Shields, Gale Henry and others. There were also travelogue and human interest documentary segments edited into split reels.
- L-KO Kompany (1914–1919) produced many Mack Sennett-influenced slapstick comedies through Universal distribution, some directed by Henry Lehrman. Stars included Raymond Griffith, Gertrude Selby, Billy Armstrong, Phil Dunham, Hank Mann, Alice Howell and Billie Ritchie.
- Laemmle Films (1915–1917) – various comedies and dramas
- The Leather Pushers (1921–1924) – sports drama two-reelers, with Billy Sullivan
- Mirror (Universal film series) (1922) was a 4-part series featured vintage newsreel footage like President McKinley
- Mustang (western shorts) (1925–1928) – two reel westerns with Edmund Cobb
- Nestor Studios (1912–1919) co-produced with Universal with its best comedies of the period with Eddie Lyons, Lee Moran and Billy Franey.
- Northwest Mounted Police (silent film series) (1927–1929) with Jack Perrin and Nelson McDowell
- Okeh Komedy (1919)
- Pat Powers Picture Plays (1912–1917) - both mini-dramas and documentaries. *Rainbow Film Productions (1920–1923)
- Red Feather Productions (1916)
- Rex Motion Picture (1912–1917) co-produced with Universal
- St. Louis Motion Picture (1913–1914) co-produced with Universal
- Slim Summerville & Bobby Dunn Comedies (1923–1925)
- Star Comedies (1917–1923) – including Hank Mann, Eddie Boland, Bartine Burkett, Austin Howard, Bert Roach, Cliff Bowes, Dorothea Wolbert, Eddie Lyons, Lee Moran, Neely Edwards and Ford Sterling. Also Star featurettes (1917) with Mary Fuller, Averill Harris & Clara Beyers
- Sterling Film Comedies (1912–1914) – all one-reel
- Tales of the Old West (1923)
- Tempest Cody (1919) – two-reelers with Marie Walcamp
- Tenderfoot (1928–1929) – two reel westerns with George Chandler
- The Texas Rangers (1928–1929) – two-reel westerns with Fred Gilman
- Tom London Westerns (1920–1921)
- Universal featurette (1918–1919) – assorted two and three reelers
- Universal Ike (1914)
- Universal Screen Magazine (followed by “New Screen Magazine”) (1916–1921) – 205 shorts
- Universal Westerns (1917–1925) – additional 2-reelers with various performers
- Victor Film (1912–1916) co-produced with Universal assorted one and two-reelers starring Florence Lawrence and J. Warren Keringan
- Walter Forde Productions (1923)
- William Wolbert as “Willy the Walrus” (1914)

== Walt Disney ==
Films distributed by RKO (1937–1956). Launched Buena Vista Distribution in 1953.

- People & Places (1952–1959)
- True Life Adventure (1948–1959, mostly features after 1953)

== Warner Bros. ==
- Academy of Motion Pictures Arts & Sciences – 2 one-reel documentaries (1948–1950) (Each studio distributed a few of these.)
- Adventures in Africa (1931)
- Al St. John – 4 two-reel comedies (silent, 1920)
- Big Time Vaudeville (1934–1937)
- Big V Comedies (1931–1938) / Girlfriends Comedy (1931–1932) / Gay-ety (1936–1938)
- Bobby Jones How I Play Golf (1931) & How to Break 90 (1933)
- Broadway Brevities (1931–1943) / Broadway Headliners (1937–1938) / Presentation Revue (1938) / Elsa Maxwell Blue Ribbon Comedy (1940) / Warner Specials (& Classics of the Screen) (1943–1956)
- A Dangerous Adventure – 15 part serial (1920)
- E. M. Newman Travelogues (1931–1938)
- Floyd Gibbons Your True Adventure (1937–1939)
- The Grouch Club (1938–1939)
- Howard Hill Bow & Arrow Adventures (1939–1941)
- Joe McDoakes (1942, 1945–1956) - 63 black and white live-action comedy one reel shorts
- Joe Palooka (1936–1937)
- The Lost City of the African Jungle – 15 chapter serial (1919)
- Louise Fazenda Comedies co-starring Chester Conklin made in 1921
- Melody Master (1931–1946) / Memories from Melody Lane (1947) / Hit Parade of the Gay Nineties (1950)
- Miracles of the Jungle – 15 chapter serial (1920)
- Monty Banks Comedies – 15 produced in 1920–21
- The Naggers (1930–1932)
- Pathé News (1947–1956) plus a dozen or so two-reel specials.
- Penrod (1931–1932)
- Rambling 'Round Radio Row (1932–1933)
- Robert Youngson shorts (1948–1956)
- Ripley's Believe It or Not! (1930–1932)
- Santa Fe Trail Western series with Robert Shayne (1943–1945) (These titles are listed among the Warner Specials and Technicolor Specials)
- S.S. Van Dine Mysteries (1931–1932)
- Scope Gem (1954–1957) / Carl Dudley Stereophonic Special (1953–1954)
- Sport Slants & Sports Thrills (1931–1932) hosted by Ted Husing
- Sports Parade (1940–1956) / Canadian Cameo (1948–1953)
- Technicolor Adventure (1945–1949)
- Technicolor Specials (Warner Bros. series) (1932–1957)
- The Tiger’s Claw – serial (1919)
- Vitaphone. Warners released hundreds of short subjects based on their proprietary sound-on-disc process from 1926 through 1930. The Vitaphone brand survived on later cartoons and other shorts produced with standard optical soundtracks.
  - Vitaphone Color Parade (1938–1940) / Mechanix Illustrated / The Immortal Brush
  - Vitaphone Pictorial Revue (1936–1938)
  - Vitaphone Varieties (1926–1932) / Pepper Pots (1931–1936) / Vitaphone Novelties (1936–1939) / Hollywood Novelties (revived Vitaphone Varieties) (1940–1956)
- Warner Featurettes (1953–1964)
- World Wide Adventures – umbrella title for most of the 1962–1970 live-action shorts

== Other series ==
- The Perils of Our Girl Reporters
  1. A Long Lane (1917)
  2. Ace High (1917)
  3. Birds of Prey (1917)
  4. Misjudged (1917)
  5. Outwitted (1917)
  6. Taking Chances (1917)
  7. The Black Door (1917)
  8. The Jade Necklace (1917)
  9. The Meeting (1917)
  10. The Schemers (1917)
  11. The Smite of Conscience (1917)
  12. The White Trail (1917)
  13. Many a Slip (1917)
  14. The Counterfeiters (1917)
  15. Kidnapped (1917)
- Lieutenant Rose
  1. Lieutenant Rose and the Robbers of Fingall's Creek (1910)
  2. Lieutenant Rose and the Foreign Spy (1910)
  3. Lieutenant Rose and the Gunrunners (1910)
  4. Lieutenant Rose and the Stolen Submarine (1910)
  5. Lieutenant Rose and the Chinese Pirates (1910)
  6. Lieutenant Rose and the Stolen Code (1911)
  7. Lieutenant Rose and the Boxers (1911)
  8. Lieutenant Rose and the Royal Visit (1911)
  9. Lieutenant Rose and the Stolen Ship (1912)
  10. Lieutenant Rose and the Moorish Raiders (1912)
  11. Lieutenant Rose and the Hidden Treasure (1912)
  12. Lieutenant Rose and the Train Wreckers (1912)
  13. Lieutenant Rose and the Patent Aeroplane (1912)
  14. Lieutenant Rose in the China Seas (1913)
  15. Lieutenant Rose and the Stolen Bullion (1913)
  16. Lieutenant Rose and the Sealed Orders (1914)
  17. How Lieutenant Rose RN Spiked the Enemy's Guns (1915)
- Terry Kelly
  1. Glove Slingers (1939)
  2. Pleased to Mitt You (1940)
  3. Fresh as a Freshman (1941)
  4. Glove Affair (1941)
  5. Mitt Me Tonight (1941)
  6. The Kink of the Campus (1941)
  7. Glove Birds (1942)
  8. A Study in Socks (1942)
  9. College Belles (1942)
  10. The Great Glover (1942)
  11. Socks Appeal (1943)
  12. His Girl's Worst Friend (1943)
- Lieutenant Daring
  1. The Adventures of Lieutenant Daring R.N.: In a South American Port (1911)
  2. Lieutenant Daring R.N. and the Secret Service Agents (1911)
  3. Lieutenant Daring Avenges an Insult to the Union Jack (1912)
  4. Lieutenant Daring and the Ship's Mascot (1912)
  5. Lieutenant Daring Defeats the Middleweight Champion (1912)
  6. Lieutenant Daring Quells a Rebellion (1912)
  7. Lieutenant Daring and the Plans of the Mine Fields (1912)
  8. Lieutenant Daring and the Photographing Pigeon (1912)
  9. Lieutenant Daring and the Labour Riots (1913)
  10. Lieutenant Daring and the Dancing Girl (1913)
  11. Lieutenant Daring and the Mystery of Room 41 (1913)
  12. Lieutenant Daring, Aerial Scout (1914)
  13. Lieutenant Daring and the Stolen Invention (1914)
  14. Lieutenant Daring RN and the Water Rats (1924)
  15. Lieutenant Daring R.N. (1935)
- Sexton Blake (1928 series)
  1. The Clue of the Second Goblet (1928)
  2. Blake the Lawbreaker (1928)
  3. Sexton Blake, Gambler (1928)
  4. Silken Threads (1928)
  5. The Great Office Mystery (1928)
  6. The Mystery of the Silent Death (1928)
- Sherlock Holmes (1908 silent series)
  1. Sherlock Holmes (1908)
  2. Sherlock Holmes II (1908)
  3. Sherlock Holmes III (1908)
  4. Sherlock Holmes IV (1909)
  5. Sherlock Holmes V (1909)
  6. Sherlock Holmes VI (1910)
- Sexton Blake (1914/1915 series)
  1. The Mystery of the Diamond Belt (1914)
  2. The Stolen Heirlooms (1915)
  3. The Counterfeiters (1915)
  4. The Great Cheque Fraud (1915)
  5. The Thornton Jewel Mystery (1915)
- The Wizard of Oz (1910 series)
  1. The Wonderful Wizard of Oz (1910)
  2. Dorothy and the Scarecrow in Oz (1910)
  3. The Land of Oz (1910)
  4. John Dough and the Cherub (1910)
- Jack Moran
  1. OHMS: Our Helpless Millions Saved (1914)
  2. Britain's Naval Secret (1915)
  3. Parted by the Sword (1915
  4. London's Enemies (1916)
- The Adventures of François Villon
  1. The Oubliette (1914)
  2. The Higher Law (1914)
  3. Monsieur Bluebeard (1914)
  4. The Ninety Black Boxes (1914)
- Nick Carter (Silent serials)
  1. Nick Carter, le roi des détectives (1908)
  2. Les nouveaux exploits de Nick Carter (1909)
  3. Nick Carter acrobate (1910)
  4. Nick Carter - Le mystère du lit blanc (1911)
- Winnie Winkle
  1. Working Winnie (1926)
  2. Happy Days (1926)
  3. Winnie's Birthday (1926)
  4. Oh! Winnie Behave (1926)
  5. Winnie's Vacation (1927)
  6. Winnie Wakes Up (1927)
  7. Winnie Steps Out (1927)
  8. Winnie Be Good (1927)
  9. Winning Winnie (1927)
  10. Winnie's Winning Ways (1928)
- The Lincoln Cycle
  1. My Mother (1917)
  2. My Father (1917)
  3. Myself (1917)
  4. Her Country's Call (1917)

== Sources ==
- BoxOffice Magazine (release date information in multiple issue “Shorts Charts”)
- Bradley, Edwin M. (2005). The First Hollywood Sound Shorts, 1926-1931. McFarland & Company. ISBN 9780786410309.
- Braff, Richard E. (1999). The Universal Silents: A Filmography of the Universal Motion Picture Manufacturing Company, 1912-1929. McFarland & Company. ISBN 9780786402878.
- Fielding, Raymond (1978). The March of Time 1935-1951. Oxford University Press. ISBN 0195022122.
- "Film Daily archives". The Online Books Page.
- Fitzgerald, Michael G. (1977). Universal Pictures: A panoramic history in words, pictures, and filmographies. Arlington House. ISBN 9780870003660. (lists all studio theatrical shorts of the 1930s and 40s)
- Koszarski, Richard (2008). Hollywood On the Hudson: Film and Television in New York from Griffith to Sarnoff. Rutgers University Press. ISBN 9780813542935.
- Lahue, Kalton C. (1966). Word of Laughter – The Motion Picture Comedy Short 1910-1930. University of Oklahoma Press. ISBN 0806112549.
- Liebman, Roy (2003). Vitaphone Films – A Catalogue of the Features and Shorts. McFarland & Company. ISBN 9780786412792.
- Maltin, Leonard (1972). The Great Movie Shorts. Bonanza Books.
- Motion Picture Herald magazine (short film listings)
- Motion Pictures 1912-1939 Catalog of Copyright Entries 1951 Library of Congress
- Motion Pictures 1940-1949 Catalog of Copyright Entries 1953 Library of Congress
- Motion Pictures 1950-1959 Catalog of Copyright Entries 1960 Library of Congress
- Motion Pictures 1960-1969 Catalog of Copyright Entries 1971 Library of Congress
- Motion Picture News Booking Guide, Motion Picture News Inc. (primary editor: William A. Johnston), each edition has a selection of short subject releases:
  - April 1922 edition
  - October 1922 edition
  - April 1923 edition
  - October 1923 edition
  - April 1924 edition
  - October 1926 edition
  - Motion Picture News Booking Guide and Studio Directory (October 1927)
  - 1929 edition
- Okuda, Ted & Watz, Edward The Columbia Comedy Shorts: Two-Reel Hollywood Film Comedies, 1933-1958 1998 McFarland & Company
- Ward, Richard Lewis (2006). A History of the Hal Roach Studios. Southern Illinois University Press. ISBN 0809327279.
