= E. M. Newman Travelogues =

American film producer documentary series

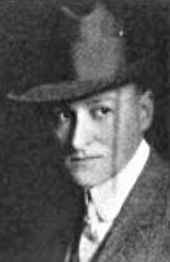
Edward M. Newman

Edward M. Newman (1870–1953) was a film producer of many documentary film shorts released by Warner Brothers and edited at Vitaphone studios in Brooklyn, New York in the 1930s. These were mostly of the travelogue genre. He was born in Cleveland, Ohio on March 16, 1870. His parents were Hungarian immigrants. He died in Los Angeles, California on April 16, 1953.

== Overview ==
Around 1930, the major studios in Hollywood discovered that travel shorts running under 11 minutes were among the cheapest to produce as "filler" on the theatrical program. The number of "faraway adventures" made for eager Depression Era audiences, who seldom traveled far from home, rapidly increased at this time. (Films of this type had been around for decades.) Only one cameraman was needed, sometimes with a few assistants, along with one editor, sometimes a studio orchestra and usually a narrator. Much of the material could be shot silent and dubbed over later, although Fox Movietone News included on-location sound recordings with many of their "Magic Carpet" series.

Compared to the competition (which included Fox, Amadee J. Van Beuren "Vagabond Adventures" for RKO Pictures, Universal Pictures "Going Places", Columbia Pictures "Rambling Reporter", Educational Pictures "Treasure Chest" and other series and Metro-Goldwyn-Mayer Burton Holmes and James A. Fitzpatrick "Traveltalks"), the Warner-Newman travelogues were well-produced and often featured locales not covered in other series. One additional novelty was that the series name changed with each "season" (lasting September through August/September of the next year), spotlighting a specific theme such as U.S. history (as seen by famous sites) and "musical journeys". This enabled the theater exhibitors to offer attendees something different and new each year.

Ira Genet collaborated as director and writer with many of these. Key editor was Bert Frank, who also worked on many other Vitaphone shorts, including some documentaries that assembled old silent film footage. Leo Donnelly was a key narrator in the earlier shorts, also handling Ripley's Believe It or Not! for Warner-Vitaphone.

When rival FitzPatrick with MGM started shooting in full Technicolor, Warner was already spending a fortune on their other two-reel musical and comedy shorts in color. As a result of this (along with various technical difficulties), the Newman series continued to be released in black and white until 1936, then opted for the more economical Cinecolor. Trade reviews tended to unfavorably compare them with the MGM Traveltalks, which boasted the full rainbow effect. Yet they continued to be praised for their expert commentary and interesting subject matter. In 1938, the so-called "Colortours" were regrouped as the Vitaphone Color Parade, moving on to multi-subject topics backed by Mechanix Illustrated.

== Earlier career ==
Prior to joining Warner-Vitaphone, E.M. Newman had roughly two decades of documentary film making experience. Unfortunately, like other pioneering "globe trotters", he was only fleetingly discussed in the periodicals of the times and is largely ignored by modern film historians. Like the more famous Burton Holmes, he was active on the travelogue lecture circuit (both with films and still photographs).

Educational Pictures, known today for its 1920s and '30s comedy films and as a distributor of animated cartoons more than its many documentaries, utilized him for a series of nature films and travelogues released in 1918, including some "scenics" of the Philippines, Japan and Mexico. Approximately thirty were produced. His interest in shooting wildlife with a camera never dimmed, since many of Warner's travelogues of the 1930s showcased such footage. (Examples include Animals of the Amazon and Slackers and Workers of the Jungle, while Berlin Today featured police dogs in training and Dear Old London covered the zoo in detail). In 1922, he tackled a 7,000 mile tour of Africa and, according to Film Daily, over 30,000 feet of footage (handled with just two assistants), including "two hundred different tribes of natives and all possible species of wild animals".

World War I saw him as a film correspondent and, according to Film Daily (August 21, 1918), "He has been with the American troops from their transports to the front. He was with them in Alsace, on the Piave and the Asiae-o Plateau. He witnessed the shelling of Paris and the raids on London. Mr. Newman's material includes all the work of the American forces, from the building of miles of railroads to the enormous bakeries. He still suffers from the effect of a gas attack, which laid him up for several weeks, and robbed him of his voice."

For the next 22 "seasons", he was on the lecture circuit and made a number of visits to the Brooklyn Institute of Arts and Sciences covering such locales as the Virgin Islands and, for his second travelogue presented at Carnegie Hall, a tour of Damascus and Syria. In 1924, he was working alongside Burton Holmes gathering material in Europe. A few months before releasing his first Warner travelogues, he had another successful Carnegie Hall presentation covering Italy with G. J. Marfleet and color work by Dorothy Rankin.

== Listing of films ==
A full list of the travelogues released between 1931 and 1938 are as follows (with review dates by Film Daily and copyright dates when release dates are not available):

=== Traveltalks ===
Burnet Hershey is sometimes credited on these:

Title	Release, copyright or review date	Location or subject
A Trip to Tibet	© March 19, 1931	Tibet
Scenic of Algiers	April 12, 1931 (Film Daily review)	featuring the "Paris of North Africa", Algiers
Animals of the Amazon	May 1931	Brazil wildlife including sloths, giant anteaters, river dolphins and monkeys
Down the Blue Danube	June 28, 1931 (Film Daily review)	Vienna, Austria & Germany
Little Journeys to Great Masters	August 1, 1931	Rome & Florence
Southern India	October 11, 1931 (Film Daily review)	
The Road to Mandalay	November 1, 1931 (Film Daily review)	Burma
Mediterranean By-ways	December 6, 1931 (Film Daily review)	Morocco, Sardinia, Malta & Pompeii (Italy)
Java	January 2, 1932 (Film Daily review)	Singapore, Colombo & Java
Northern India	March 20, 1932 (Film Daily review)	includes Agra region
Oberammergau, Land of the Passion Play	April 3, 1932	covers the 1930 performance in Bavaria (Germany)
Soviet Russia	May 15, 1932 (Film Daily review)	features Saint Petersburg
When in Rome	June 11, 1932 (Film Daily review)	Rome
A South American Journey (South American Journeys)	June 25, 1932 (Film Daily review)	Brazil & Argentina included
Paris Glimpses	July 9, 1932 (Film Daily review)	Includes the Eiffel Tower & Champs-Élysées
Dancing Around the World	August 24, 1932 (Film Daily review)	Spain, Sweden, Italy (cameo by Douglas Fairbanks visiting), the Zulu people & Java
Dear Old London	August 26, 1932 (Film Daily review)	features London Zoo

=== World Adventures ===
Primary narrator was Leo Donnelly.

Title	Release, copyright or review date	Location
Berlin Today	August 31, 1932 (Film Daily review)	features police dog training in Berlin
Beauty Spots of the World	September 17, 1932 (Film Daily review)	Blue Grotto (Capri), Amalfi, the Acropolis of Athens, various spots in Japan & India
Transportation of the World	© September 21, 1932	
Wonder Spots of the World	October 3, 1932 (Film Daily review)	includes Victoria Falls in Zambia, Pisa (Italy), Egypt including the Great Sphinx of Giza & the Taj Mahal
An Oriental Cocktail	October 10, 1932 (© September 29)	Hawaii (brief stop), mostly Japan
Curious Customs of the World	© October 17, 1932	Includes Parsi customs in India, spirit killing in Bali, dances in Korea & Hawaii
Seeing Samoa	October 18, 1932 (Film Daily review)	
From Bethlehem to Jerusalem	© November 26, 1932	
High Spots of the Far East	© February 6, 1933	Pearl River (China), Siam & Egypt
Strange Ceremonies of the World	© March 31, 1933	Japan, Hawaii
Main Streets	© April 12, 1933	New York City, Paris, Venice & others
Workers of the World	May 6, 1933	fishing in Ireland, Sulu harvesting, native American crafts
Costumes of the World	© July 24, 1933	
Top of the World	© September 15, 1933	Iceland

=== Musical World Journeys ===
Title	Release, copyright or review date	Location
Exploring the Pacific	September 23, 1933	Cocos Islands, Galapagos & Tahiti
Samoan Memories	© October 25, 1933	Samoa
The Cannibal Isles (In the Cannibal Island)	© February 28, 1934	Fiji & other parts
Italy, the New and the Old	© March 2, 1934	Venice
Spanish America	© March 2, 1934	Cuba, Mexico, Panama & other parts
Jerusalem, the Holy City	© March 15, 1934	
Heart of Paris	© March 24, 1934	
Slackers and Workers of the Jungle	© July 16, 1934	Ceylon elephants & Malayan monkeys
The East Indies	© July 23, 1934	Indonesia
Picturesque Siam	© July 25, 1934	
Dark Africa	© August 2, 1934	Ethiopia & Gulf of Aden
A Visit to the South Seas	© October 4, 1934	
Central America	© October 5, 1934	

=== See America First ===
Mostly narrated by John B. Kennedy, these United States locational travelogues were distributed in a more chronological order (based on historical periods) after their initial releases. The first three were shown in Washington D.C. at a special screening.

Title	Release or review date	Subject
Pilgrim Days	August 28, 1934	
Boston Tea Party	August 28, 1934	where the Revolutionary War began
Dixieland	August 28, 1934	tour of the pre-Civil War south
Hail Columbia	© November 22, 1934	covers terrain of Louisiana Purchase
Remember the Alamo	© January 2, 1935	Texas tour
The Blue and the Gray	March 2, 1935	profiles site of the Civil War (United States), along with veterans on parade (newsreel footage)
Westward Bound	April 13, 1935	
The Trail of the 49ers	© April 22, 1935	mostly California
Remember the Maine	May 4, 1935	covers Spanish–American War
The Yanks are Coming	June 1, 1935	vintage footage of World War I
Boom Days	June 23, 1935	vintage footage from the last decade
The Mormon Trail	© July 6, 1935	
Forward Together	July 13, 1935	saluting the last few years and President Roosevelt

=== Our Own U.S. ===
Title	Narrator	Release or review date	Subjects
Curious Industries	Harry Von Zell	September 7, 1935	scrap iron collecting, oil drilling, goats & frog farming, clam & turtle fishing.
Playgrounds	James Wallington	October 5, 1935	Virginia Beach, Coney Island, Palm Springs, Florida, Lake Placid (New York), Lake Marancook
Camera Hunting	Paul Douglas	October 18, 1935 (Film Daily review)	critter footage: beavers, trained ducks, cat & monkey team, alligators
Nature's Handiwork	David Ross	November 29, 1935	Yellowstone, Grand Canyon, Yosemite & other national parks.
Odd Occupations	Ken Roberts	November 27, 1935	includes sponge diving in Tarpon Springs, Florida, turtle hunting, shoe-making in Pensacola, Florida & sulphur mining
Steel and Stone	Milton Cross	January 25, 1936	history of bridge construction
A Day's Journey	Harlan Reed	February 22, 1936	San Francisco, New Orleans and other cities
We Eat to Live	Howard Claney	April 9, 1936 (Film Daily review)	NYC Fulton Fish Market, Chicago's stockyards, Florida citrus
Vacation Spots	Don Wilson	April 18, 1936	Includes Key West, Saratoga Springs, New York, Bar Harbor, Maine & Hot Springs National Park. Parts in Cinecolor.
Harbor Lights	H. V. Kaltenborn	March 21, 1936	Ellis Island, Seattle, San Francisco, Savannah, Georgia & Galveston, Texas
Irons in the Fire	John S. Young	June 13, 1936	
Can You Imagine?	Ray Saunders	July 13, 1936	Milwaukee Zoo, lion wrestling, Provincetown, Massachusetts town cryer, etc.
For Sports' Sake	Brooke Temple	August 5, 1936	includes mule baseball

=== Colortour Adventures ===
Filmed in “Naturalcolor” and Cinecolor

Title	Narrator	Release or review date	Location or subjects
The Pearl of the Pacific		September 5, 1936	Hawaii
Colorful Occupations	Paul Douglas	October 3, 1936	ladybug farms, flower designing, balloons, Siamese cat breeding
Northern Lights	Jean Paul King	October 21, 1936	Sweden
The Hollanders	Basil Ruysdael	January 2, 1937	Netherlands
Along the Mediterranean	Howard Claney	January 23, 1937	Morocco, Spain, Greece & Italy
Nice Work	Milton Cross	January 30, 1937	Norway fishing, Hawaii sugar, native American crafts
Land of the Midnight Sun	Alan Kent	February 27, 1937	Norway
Nature the Artist	David Ross	March 20, 1937	footage of flowers, from California deserts through a Holland, Michigan show
Cradle of Civilization	Kenneth Roberts	April 17, 1937	Rhodes, Athens & Istanbul
Alpine Grandeur	Alan Kent	May 15, 1937	Switzerland
Gateway to Africa	Howard Claney	June 12, 1937	Morocco
Land of the Magyar	Basil Ruysdael	July 3, 1937	Hungary
Crossing the Sahara	Howard Claney	August 14, 1937	includes Morocco & Egypt
Long Bright Land	Howard Claney	September 18, 1937	New Zealand including the kiwi
It's Work	Paul Douglas	October 23, 1937	
Mysterious Ceylon	Basil Ruysdael	November 20, 1937	Sri Lanka
Land of the Kangaroo	Howard Claney	December 18, 1937	Australia
India's Millions	Basil Ruysdael	January 8, 1938	
Malayan Jungles	Howard Claney	February 5, 1938	Malay Peninsula including wildlife like the Chevrotain, along with native sports
What the World Makes	Paul Douglas	March 12, 1938	
Pearl of the East	Howard Claney	March 21, 1938	mostly India
Crossroads of the Orient	Basil Ruysdael	April 2, 1938	Singapore
Toradja Land	Howard Claney	April 30, 1938	Celebes (Sulawesi) & Borneo
Isles of Enchantment	Howard Claney	July 21, 1938	Komodo (island), Flores & Bali
The Hermit Kingdom	Dwight Weist	August 27, 1938	Siam

== See also ==
- List of short subjects by Hollywood studio#Warner Brothers
- Travelogue (films)
- Vitaphone Color Parade
- Burton Holmes
