= Sexton Blake (disambiguation) =

Sexton Blake is a fictional British detective created in 1893.

Sexton Blake may also refer to:

- Sexton Blake (band), American rock band
- Sexton Blake (1928 serial), 1928 silent film serial
- Sexton Blake (TV series), 1967–71 TV series
