= Vitaphone Color Parade =

Documentary short film series

The “Vitaphone Color Parade” was a series of documentary short films produced by Warner Bros.

== Overview ==
The majority of these one-reel (under 10 minutes) short subjects were produced by Edward Newman of the E. M. Newman Travelogues and co-directed by Ira Genet in New York at the Vitaphone studios, but a few later entries were completed in California. These were directed by Del Frazier with Gordon Hollingshead as producer.

Mechanix Illustrated backed a series that resembled, in part, the Jerry Fairbanks Popular Science (film) series made for rival studio Paramount Pictures. These consisted of individual segments spotlighting technical marvels and took cameras “behind the scenes” to show how popular household items were manufactured.

A few were shot in full Technicolor, but the majority edited in New York utilized the more economical Cinecolor. By 1940, these were replaced by the Sports Parade.

== List of titles ==
List of films by title / major credits (not complete) / release date or copyright date (marked ©) / notes:

Title	Major credits	Release date	Notes
Robert Edgren's Miracles of Sport	Robert W. Edgren (directed); narrator: Rush Hughes	September 10, 1938	
Pow Wow	Lansing Holden (director)	October 1, 1938	full Technicolor views of Navajo
China Today	narrator: Dwight Weist	October 1, 1938	
Mechanix Illustrated No. 1	narrator: Dwight Weist	November 5, 1938	making paint, food preparation on trains, liquid air preservation.
The Immortal Brush	Horace Shepherd (director); narrator: Dwight Weist)	November 19, 1938	full Technicolor documentaries on British painters, the first featuring Joshua Reynolds, Thomas Gainsborough, Frans Hals, among others. Three of these titles were released in the U.K. earlier on March 19.
Nature's Mimics	narrator: Eddie Acuff	December 8, 1938	features chimpanzees, trained birds, seals & a harmonica playing elephant
Mechanix Illustrated No. 2	narrator: Jean Paul King	January 7, 1939 (© December 12, 1938)	weather forecasting, synthesizing vitamins, television & fire alarms.
Points on Pointers	Del Frazier (director)	January 28, 1939	first of a series on dogs
The Master's Touch	Horace Shepherd; narrator: Dwight Weist	February 18, 1939	“Immortal Bush” series, released in U.K. on March 19, 1938
Mechanix Illustrated No. 3	narrator: Dwight Weist	February 25, 1939	natural gas, doll making, face powder & airplane assembly.
The Roaming Camera		March 25, 1939	Hawaiian football, hairstyles & seamanship
Mechanix Illustrated No. 4	narrator: Dwight Weist	April 22, 1939	bullet making, skeet shooting, gold beating & artificial flowers.
For Your Convenience	narrator: Dwight Weist	May 20, 1939	how to hide “black eyes” with makeup, parachutes, coffee makers & vibrating machines for "girth".
Mechanix Illustrated No. 5	narrator: Dwight Weist	June 10, 1939	candy, lead pencils, New York police crime lab.
Modern Methods		July 15, 1939	tide measurements, remote controls in the home, hat & mask making
Mechanix Illustrated No. 6	narrator: Dwight Weist	August 5, 1939	precision flying, lie detectors, color photography.
Mechanix Illustrated No. 7	narrator: Dwight Weist	© August 5, 1939	jewelry polishing, chinaware manufacturing, polarized light, production of billboards
Romance in Color	Horace Shepherd; narrator: Dwight Weist	© August 19, 1939	“Immortal Bush” series, released in U.K. on March 19, 1938
Mechanix Illustrated No. 8 (Series 2-1)	narrator: Dwight Weist	September 30, 1939	gemstones, Polaroid glass & advertising signs.
American Saddle Horses	Del Frazier; music: Howard Jackson; narrator: John Deering	November 11, 1939	
Mechanix Illustrated No. 9 (Series 2-2)	narrator: Dwight Weist	December 2, 1939	making of ice cream sticks, dragline mining in Alaska, New York fireboats & the manufacture of artist's paints
New Horizons	music: Howard Jackson; narrator: John Deering	January 6, 1940	Alaska travelogue
Mechanix Illustrated No. 10 (Series 2-3)	music: Howard Jackson; narrator: Dwight Weist	February 7, 1940	Alaskan salmon run, liquid silk & electric signs
Men Wanted	music: Howard Jackson; narrator: John Deering	March 23, 1940	More about Alaska
Gun Dog Life (Gun Dog's Life)	Del Frazier (director); music: Howard Jackson; narrator: John Deering	May 11, 1940	mostly retrievers and spaniels
Mechanix Illustrated No. 11 (Series 2-4)	music: Howard Jackson; narrator: Dwight Weist	© June 29, 1940	aviation, streamlining in design, product testing & fire extinguishing.
Dogs You Seldom See	Del Frazier (director); music: Howard Jackson; narrator: Knox Manning	July 6, 1940	Profiles less famous breeds like the Saluki and Chinese Crested
The Valley	music: Howard Jackson; narrator: John Deering	© July 20, 1940	Alaska's Matanuska Valley
Famous Movie Dogs	Del Frazier (director); music: Howard Jackson; narrator: John Deering	August 17, 1940	

== See also ==
- E. M. Newman Travelogues
- List of short subjects by Hollywood studio § Warner Brothers
- Travelogue (films)
