= Adventures in Africa =

American documentary short film series

Adventures in Africa is a series of Warner Bros. documentary film shorts inspired by the success of Martin and Osa Johnson and concurrent features such as Africa Speaks! and Trader Horn.

== Premise ==
Wynant D. Hubbard (1900-1961), the author of several books on the continent and its wildlife, spent several months in 1929-1930 in Rhodesia with his wife and two children and cameraman W. Earle Frank assisting. Funding was partly provided by the American Geographic Society. The chronicle of his adventures, with recorded sound adding to the authenticity, was edited from an estimated 103,000 feet of footage and proved to be a popular summertime theatrical series in 1931.

The studio later reedited the footage into a feature called Untamed Africa that was released on April 8, 1933 by Warner Bros. under the Vitagraph mark. Hubbard returned to Africa and it is possible that this additional footage was included in the feature but not in the original shorts.

== Use as educational materials ==
As with several other Warner Bros. short-film series, these black-and-white films enjoyed a second life as educational material for public schools until they were supplanted in the 1950s by newer African travelogues in color. ridicule of other races and the few hunting scenes are for village meat, not trophies.)

In July 2011, the Warner Archive Collection released the film on DVD along with Kongo (1932). The UCLA film archive maintains a group of the original short films.

== Episodes ==
The original titles of the shorts, with dates indicating The Film Daily previews:

1. Into the Unknown / 15 minutes / May 17, 1931 (premier date; several films copyrighted on April 13) / features a fight between a lion and a hyena
2. An African Boma / 10 minutes / June 21 / focuses on village life
3. The Lion Hunt / 15 minutes / July 5
4. Spears of Death / 14 minutes / July 5
5. Trails of the Hunted / 18 minutes / July 19 / includes wildebeest, baboons, and a number of pets adopted by the Hubbard children
6. The Buffalo Stampede / 17 minutes / August 9
7. The Witch Doctor's Magic / 10 minutes / September 6 / Hubbard and his assistants aid a tribe “scaring to death” lechwe for food without any weapons involved
8. Flaming Jungles / 13 minutes / September / a brush fire almost destroys their lodgings
9. Dangerous Trails / 15 minutes / September 27 / scenes of hippopotamus and crocodiles
10. Maneaters / 17 minutes / September 27 / a lion attacking cattle is hunted down
11. Beasts of the Wilderness / 12 minutes / October 25 / antelope herds featured
12. Unconquered Africa / 16 minutes / November 8 / mostly a recap

== See also ==
- List of short subjects by Hollywood studio § Warner Brothers
