= The Grouch Club =

The Grouch Club is a talk show broadcast on CBS Radio West Coast on Mondays (later Tuesdays) between October 17, 1938 and April 25, 1939, then on Sundays at 6:30 p.m. on NBC Red Network April 16, 1939 through January 21, 1940. Comedy writer Nat Hiken created the series. Host Jack Lescoulie served as “grouchmaster”, listening to people who wanted to complain about any problem in their life. Among the “grouchies” featured were familiar radio personalities (some also in movies): Arthur Q. Bryan (the future voice of Elmer Fudd), Jack Albertson, Emory Parnell, Ned Sparks, Don Brodie, Mary Milford, Phil Kramer, and Eric Burtis. Beth Wilson was the featured singer and the hosts were Neil Reagan and Jim Barry. Screenwriter Owen Crump produced the series and Roland Kibbee was one of the writers.

Concurrent with the show was a series of one-reel (10-minute) comedy shorts co-written by and co-starring Jack Lescoulie (billed as Jack Lescoulie, Jr.). These were produced in New York by Vitaphone and released by Warner Bros. Arthur Q. Bryan and actress Nancy Evans often appeared in these, which showed an unfortunate soul struggling with library red tape, voting difficulties, parking problems, and other troubles, warranting membership in the “Grouch Club”. Lloyd French was usually the director. The first of the series, The Great Library Misery, won an Academy Award as "Best One-Reel Novelty"; it has been released on the DVD of The Roaring Twenties as a bonus feature.

The Grouch Club films:

- The Great Library Misery (September 10, 1938)
- Tax Trouble (March 18, 1939)
- Witness Trouble (July 29, 1939)
- Vote Trouble (September 9, 1939)
- No Parking (December 22, 1939)
- Trouble in Store (December 23, 1939)

The films were released to television in 1957.

== See also ==
- List of short subjects by Hollywood studio#Warner Bros.
