= List of Pennsylvania state historical markers in Luzerne County =

Location of Luzerne County in Pennsylvania

This is a list of the Pennsylvania state historical markers in Luzerne County.

This is intended to be a complete list of the official state historical markers placed in Luzerne County, Pennsylvania by the Pennsylvania Historical and Museum Commission (PHMC). The locations of the historical markers, as well as the latitude and longitude coordinates as provided by the PHMC's database, are included below when available. There are 71 historical markers located in Luzerne County.

== Historical markers ==
Marker title	Image	Date dedicated	Location	Marker type	Topics
Abijah Smith & Company		June 4, 1989	US 11 (Main St.) at Natl. Guard Armory, Plymouth; 41.23529°N 75.96142°W	Roadside	Business & Industry, Coal, Invention, Professions & Vocations, Transportation
Amedeo Obici (1877-1947)		September 22, 2007	632 S Main St., Wilkes-Barre; 41.23515°N 75.90095°W	Roadside	Business & Industry, Entrepreneurs, Ethnic & Immigration, Professions & Vocations
American Institute of Mining Engineers		May 16, 2016	16 S River St., Wilkes-Barre, in front of parking lot 41.24792°N 75.88424°W	Roadside	Business & Industry, Coal, Education, Iron & Steel, Oil & Gas, Professions & Vocations, Science & Medicine
Arthur Horace James (1883-1973)		July 28, 2004	150 E Main St. (Washington & Main), Plymouth; 41.24182°N 75.94109°W	Roadside	Coal, Ethnic & Immigration, Government & Politics, Government & Politics 20th Century, Governors
Assarughney		August 4, 1948	Pa. 92, 1 mile N of West Pittston (Missing)	Roadside	Cities & Towns, Early Settlement, Native American
Avondale Mine Disaster		October 1, 1994	US 11 near junction PA 29, Plymouth Twp. 41.22645°N 75.97455°W	Roadside	Business & Industry, Coal, Government & Politics 19th Century, Labor
Baltimore Mine Tunnel Disaster		January 22, 2014	41 Spring St., Wilkes-Barre 41.24543°N 75.86084°W	Roadside	Coal, Government & Politics 20th Century, Labor, Police and Safety
Battle of Wyoming		June 1, 1952	Wyoming Ave. (US 11) & Susquehanna Ave., at monument, Wyoming; 41.30568°N 75.84508°W	Roadside	American Revolution, Forts, Military, Native American
Bloody Rock, The		September 22, 1962	Susquehanna Ave., between 7th & 8th Sts., Wyoming; 41.30808°N 75.83206°W	City	American Revolution, Military, Native American, Women
Concrete City		October 9, 1998	Front St. & Phillips St., near athletic fields, Hanover section of Nanticoke; 41.18551°N 75.98062°W	Roadside	Buildings, Business & Industry, Coal, Labor
Connecticut Settlement		October 13, 1947	River Rd. (SR 2004) N of Wilkes-Barre, at city cemetery 41.25619°N 75.87016°W	Roadside	Early Settlement, Government & Politics, Government & Politics 18th Century, Native American
Daniel J. Flood (1903-1994)		October 1, 2010	Public Sq., Wilkes-Barre 41.246243°N 75.882328°W	Roadside	Government & Politics 20th Century
Denison House		May 23, 1972	At site, 35 Denison St. (at Wyoming Ave.), Forty Fort; 41.29842°N 75.86232°W	Roadside	American Revolution, Houses & Homesteads, Military
Eckley Miners' Village		May 15, 2015	At site entrance, just off Eckley/Buck Mountain Rd. (SR 2051), Foster Twp. 40.99553°N 75.85568°W	Roadside	Coal, Labor, Motion Pictures & Television
Edward A. Walsh (1881-1959)		July 31, 2004	N. Main St. at Carey St., Plains; 41.27538°N 75.85086°W	Roadside	Baseball, Sports
Erie Railroad Co. v. Tompkins		October 13, 1997	Rock St., at Catholic Church, Hughestown; 41.32874°N 75.77739°W	Roadside	Government & Politics, Government & Politics 20th Century, Railroads
Fort Durkee		October 13, 1947	River St. near South St., Wilkes-Barre; 41.24496°N 75.89°W	Roadside	Early Settlement, Forts, Military
Fort Wyoming		October 13, 1947	River St. near South St., Wilkes-Barre; 41.24543°N 75.88917°W	Roadside	American Revolution, Forts, Military
Forty Fort		October 13, 1947	US 11 (Wyoming Ave.) & River St., Forty Fort; 41.28528°N 75.87304°W	Roadside	American Revolution, Forts, Military, Native American
Franz Kline (1910-1962)		September 7, 2001	River Commons on River St., between South & Northampton Sts., Wilkes-Barre; 41.24522°N 75.88963°W	Roadside	Artists
Fred Morgan Kirby (1861-1940)		June 10, 2004	202 South River St. (Kirby Hall), Wilkes-Barre; 41.2448°N 75.88997°W	Roadside	Business & Industry, Civil Rights, Education, Entrepreneurs, Medicine & Science
George Catlin		October 13, 1947	River & South Sts., Wilkes-Barre; 41.24493°N 75.89016°W	Roadside	Artists, Native American, Professions & Vocations
Harveys Lake		June 22, 1997	At Harveys Lake Borough Bldg./Police Dept., Rt. 415, 1/4 mile S of Harvey's Lake; 41.35054°N 76.02847°W	Roadside	Sports, Transportation
Henry M. Hoyt		October 1, 1952	714 Wyoming Ave. (US 11), Kingston; 41.27267°N 75.88554°W	City	Government & Politics, Government & Politics 18th Century, Governors
Huber Coal Breaker		September 4, 2017	101 S Main St., Ashley 41.21053°N 75.90253°W	Roadside	Business & Industry, Coal
Jenkins' Fort		October 13, 1947	Wyoming/Exeter Ave. (US 11/PA 92) at Susquehanna Ave., West Pittston; 41.32776°N 75.79303°W	Roadside	American Revolution, Forts, Military
Jesse Fell (1751-1830)		February 11, 1997	Corner of E Northampton and S Washington Sts., Wilkes-Barre; 41.24301°N 75.88363°W	City	Business & Industry, Coal, Government & Politics, Invention, Professions & Vocations
John S. Fine (1893-1978)		August 19, 2016	400 block of Koskiusko St, Nanticoke 41.20333°N 75.98929°W	Roadside	Government & Politics 20th Century, Governors, Military, Motion Pictures & Television, Police and Safety, Science & Medicine
Knox Mine Disaster		January 24, 1999	at former St. Joseph's Cath. Church on Main St., Port Griffith, Jenkins Twp. (next to local meml. stone); 41.31327°N 75.8078°W	Roadside	Business & Industry, Coal, Labor
Lattimer Massacre		September 12, 1997	S side of PA 924, .3 miles S of I-81 interchange, Harwood (at Harwood Mines); 40.9461°N 76.0173°W	Roadside	Coal, Ethnic & Immigration, Labor
Lattimer Massacre		September 10, 1972	Lattimer Rd. (T5550) & Quality Rd. (T336), just E of Lattimer Crossroads, N of Hazleton; 40.99138°N 75.96765°W	Roadside	Coal, Ethnic & Immigration, Government & Politics, Government & Politics 19th Century, Labor
Lehigh Path		August 2, 2001	Honey Hole Rd., 5 mi. E of PA 309, in Nescopeck State Park (trail pking. lot), Drums; 41.08762°N 75.88758°W	Roadside	Native American, Paths & Trails, Transportation
Luzerne County		September 24, 1982	Courthouse, 200 N. River St., at North St., Wilkes-Barre; 41.25199°N 75.87818°W	City	Coal, Government & Politics, Government & Politics 18th Century, Labor, Military
Lyman Hakes Howe (1856–1923)		September 18, 2000	S River Rd. & South St., Wilkes-Barre; 41.24505°N 75.88984°W	City	Motion Pictures & Television
Min L. Matheson (1909-1992)		September 24, 1999	Public Sq. at Market & Main, Wilkes-Barre; 41.24558°N 75.88162°W	Roadside	Government & Politics, Labor, Women
Nanticoke		August 4, 1948	W Main St. (US 11), at bridge to Nanticoke	Roadside	Cities & Towns, Early Settlement, Native American
Nanticoke		July 6, 1951	E Main St. at Kosciuszko St., Nanticoke	Roadside	Cities & Towns, Native American
Nescopeck		November 1948	S side of 3rd St. (PA 93), SE of bridge, Nescopeck; 41.05103°N 76.22801°W	Roadside	Early Settlement, Forts, French & Indian War, Native American
Nescopeck		April 1949	Front St. (US 11) at Fowler Ave., East Berwick; 41.05855°N 76.22517°W	Roadside	Native American, Paths & Trails, Transportation
Nescopeck		July 14, 1948	US 11, .5 mile E of East Berwick	Roadside	Cities & Towns, Early Settlement, Native American
Pete Gray Wyshner		August 24, 2003	Front St. & Center St., Hanover section, Nanticoke (at athletic fields); 41.18519°N 75.98336°W	Roadside	Baseball, Military Post-Civil War, Sports
Peter F. Rothermel		1970	3rd St. (PA 93) between Montgomery & Cooper Sts. (opposite #119), Nescopeck; 41.05207°N 76.22531°W	Roadside	Artists, Civil War, Government & Politics
Pittston Fort		October 13, 1947	N Main & Parsonage Sts., Pittston; 41.32952°N 75.78752°W	Roadside	American Revolution, Forts, Military
Rev. John J. Curran (1859-1936)		April 22, 1995	Holy Savior Church, 43 Penn St., Wilkes-Barre; 41.24559°N 75.86292°W	City	Coal, Government & Politics, Labor, Religion
Rev. Joseph Murgas		November 25, 1990	Sacred Heart Church, 601 N. Main St., Wilkes-Barre; 41.25706°N 75.86447°W	City	Artists, Business & Industry, Ethnic & Immigration, Invention, Medicine & Science, Professions & Vocations, Religion
Saints Peter and Paul Lutheran Church		June 18, 1971	339 Washington St., Freeland; 41.01471°N 75.89612°W	Roadside	Buildings, Ethnic & Immigration, Religion
Sephaniah Reese		May 31, 1992	230 W. Main St., Plymouth; 41.23922°N 75.95001°W	City	Business & Industry, Invention, Professions & Vocations
Shawnee Flats		August 4, 1947	US 11, .8 mile SW of Plymouth	Roadside	Early Settlement, Environment, Native American
Shawnee Fort		May 25, 2003	747 West Main St. (Rt. 11) at Natl. Guard Armory, Plymouth (very near Abijah Smith marker); 41.23532°N 75.9613°W	Roadside	American Revolution, Early Settlement, Ethnic & Immigration, Forts, George Washington, Military
St. Joseph's Church		November 2, 1970	5th & Laurel Sts., adjacent to church steps and opposite St. Joseph School, Hazleton; 40.96332°N 75.97363°W	City	Buildings, Ethnic & Immigration, Religion
Sugarloaf Massacre		October 13, 1947	E side of PA 93, at Hidden Creek Ct., near Conyngham; 40.98788°N 76.06465°W	Roadside	American Revolution, Military, Native American
Sugarloaf Massacre		September 1933	Walnut Ave. (opposite #95) & Orchard Ln., Conynham (N of PA 93); 40.98867°N 76.04816°W	Plaque	American Revolution, Military, Native American
Sullivan Expedition Against the Iroquois Indians, 1779 - Fort Wyoming (PLAQUE)		n/a	River Commons, River St. near W. South St., Wilkes-Barre; 41.24538°N 75.8895°W	Plaque	American Revolution, Forts, Military, Native American
Sullivan Expedition Against the Iroquois Indians, 1779 - Lackawanay (PLAQUE)		1929	PA 92, 1.5 miles N of West Pittston; 41.34921°N 75.80203°W	Plaque	American Revolution, Military, Native American
Sullivan's March		October 13, 1947	Pa. 115, 6.3 miles SE of Wilkes-Barre	Roadside	American Revolution, Military
Sullivan's March		October 13, 1947	PA 92, 1 mile N of West Pittston	Roadside	American Revolution, Military
Sullivan's March		September 24, 1946	Pa. 115, 11.2 miles SE of Wilkes-Barre	Roadside	American Revolution, Military
Teedyuscung (ca. 1700–1763)		June 23, 2005	16 Riverside Dr. near Sheldon St., across from Wyoming Valley Sanitary Auth. #12, Wilkes-Barre; 41.24488°N 75.89482°W	Roadside	Early Settlement, Government & Politics 18th Century, Native American, Religion
Twin Shaft Disaster		June 1, 1992	N. Main & Union Sts., Pittston; 41.34159°N 75.78603°W	Roadside	Business & Industry, Labor
Wapwallopen		November 1948	PA 239 & W County Rd., just S of Wapwallopen; 41.32098°N 75.79155°W	Roadside	Cities & Towns, Early Settlement, Native American, Paths & Trails
Warriors Path		September 23, 1994	Koonsville/Sunshine Highway (SR 4010) near Mountain Rd., just W of Koonsville; 41.16885°N 76.16641°W	Roadside	Native American, Paths & Trails, Transportation
White Haven		May 25, 1985	Berwick St. (PA 940) & Main St., at bank, W of bridge, White Haven; 41.06111°N 75.77299°W	City	Cities & Towns, Navigation
Wilkes-Barre		May 5, 1949	Route 309 near Northampton Ave., Wilkes-Barre; 41.22884°N 75.87331°W	Roadside	Cities & Towns, Military
Wilkes-Barre		May 5, 1949	Market St. at Kirby Park, Wilkes-Barre; 41.25273°N 75.88876°W	Roadside	Cities & Towns, Military
Wilkes-Barre		May 5, 1949	Kidder St. (Rt. 315) off Rt. 115/309, at Fairfield Inn, near Wyoming Valley Mall, Wilkes-Barre; 41.25042°N 75.8401°W	Roadside	Cities & Towns, Military
Wilkes-Barre Fort		October 13, 1947	W corner of public sq., Main & Market Sts., Wilkes-Barre; 41.29622°N 75.88172°W	Roadside	American Revolution, Forts, Military
William Camp Gildersleeve (1795-1871)		October 16, 2004	20 E Ross St., Wilkes-Barre; 41.24065°N 75.89007°W	Roadside	African American, Government & Politics 19th Century, Professions & Vocations, Underground Railroad
William G. McGowan (1927-1992)		December 13, 2006	Public Sq., Market & Main Sts., Wilkes-Barre; 41.24606°N 75.88134°W	City	Business & Industry, Entrepreneurs, Government & Politics 20th Century, Medicine & Science
Workers in Greater Pittston's Garment Industry		June 9, 2006	S Main St., between Market & Kennedy Sts. 41.32098°N 75.79155°W	Roadside	Business & Industry, Labor, Women
Wyoming Division Canal		August 20, 1994	At Co. Courthouse, 200 N River St., near W Jackson St. intersection, Wilkes-Barre; 41.25041°N 75.88016°W	Roadside	Canals, Coal, Navigation, Transportation

== See also ==
- List of Pennsylvania state historical markers
- National Register of Historic Places listings in Luzerne County, Pennsylvania
