= Wyoming Division Canal =

Specifications
- Length: 17 miles (27 km)
- Locks: 5
- Status: Closed

History
- Original owner: Pennsylvania, then North Branch Canal Company
- Construction began: 1831
- Date completed: 1834
- Date closed: 1882

Geography
- Start point: West Nanticoke
- End point: Pittston

The Wyoming Division Canal was an anthracite canal in Luzerne County, Pennsylvania, in the United States. It was a branch of the North Branch Canal, which was one of only two major canals in Pennsylvania to be owned by the state. The creek went from West Nanticoke to Pittston, going through Luzerne County.

== Course ==
The Wyoming Division Canal started near Solomon Creek. It paralleled the eastern bank of the Susquehanna River in Wilkes-Barre, crossing over Mill Creek via an aqueduct and passed by the Hollenback Cemetery and the current site of the Luzerne County Courthouse. The canal then ran to Back Street, which is now known as Pennsylvania Avenue, and paralleled it for some distance before paralleling Wilkes-Barre Boulevard, and passing by the Stegmaier Building. It then ran back in the direction of the river between Union Street and Bennett Street. The canal at this point passed through a geographical formation called the Redoubt, which was at least 165 feet (50 m) high. The canal ended at Pittston.

== History and significance ==
In 1831, George Wolf, the governor of Pennsylvania, borrowed $2,400,000 to create and expand a number of canals in Pennsylvania, including the Wyoming Division Canal. The purpose of this canal was to connect the city of Philadelphia the state of New York with the coal-mining lands in Luzerne County, and to connect the Pennsylvania Canal with the Erie Canal. The project was approved by the state legislature with a $100,000 budget, but was delayed for several years. Reasons for the delay included arguments over the course of the canal, inclement weather, and disagreements between the contractors and the engineers.

Construction began in 1831, and by February 1832, 6 miles (9.7 km) of canal had been built and the budget had been exceeded. By 1833, the estimated budget had reached $220,594.56. The estimated completion date was changed to August 1833, but construction did not finish until June 23, 1834. The total cost of the canal was $342,625.

There were numerous geographical difficulties with the construction of the Wyoming Division Canal. These included large cliffs near Wilkes-Barre.

The Wyoming Division Canal was sold by the state to a private company, the North Branch Canal Company in April 1858. In 1865, the canal was damaged in a flood, but was rebuilt.

The Wyoming Canal closed in 1882. It was succeeded in functionality by the Lehigh Valley Railroad.

The Pennsylvania Historical and Museum Commission placed a Pennsylvania State Historical Marker commemorating the Wyoming Division Canal in Wilkes-Barre in August 1994. The Wyoming Division Canal contributed to the Wyoming Valley becoming the largest producer of anthracite in the world.

== Description and features ==
The Wyoming Division Canal had a total length of 17 miles (27 km). It ran between West Nanticoke and Pittston. It also had a public boat basin. A 30 feet (9.1 m) wall was also constructed on the canal. The depth of the water in the canal was 48 inches (120 cm).

Boats accessing the Wyoming Division Canal via the North Branch Canal did so by taking a rope ferry across the Susquehanna River to the Wyoming Division Canal.

The Wyoming Division Canal had five locks. The first lock was called the Outlet Lock and was 12 feet (3.7 m) in height. The second one was unnamed and was 10 feet (3.0 m) in height. The third one was in Wilkes-Barre and was also 10 feet (3.0 m) in height. The fourth one was in Plainsville and was 6 feet (1.8 m) in height. The fifth lock was at Port Blanchard and was 7 feet (2.1 m) in height.

== Uses ==
The main locations that the Wyoming Division Canal was used to transport goods to included Harrisburg, Philadelphia, and the Great Lakes. However, some coal barons were unwilling to rely entirely on the canal to transport their coal.

== See also ==
- Pennsylvania Canal
- List of Pennsylvania state historical markers in Luzerne County
