= Sport Slants =

Short films production by Warner Bros

The Sport Slants (a.k.a. Sports Slants) and its follow-up “Sports Thrills” were a series of documentary film shorts produced by Warner Brothers and hosted by the top sports caster of the 1930s, Ted Husing.

== Overview ==
Each black & white film ran 8 to 9 minutes in length and covered three or four topics much like a newsreel. Ted Husing was a leading announcer, with the Warner Brothers ad campaign declaring in Film Daily (May 30, 1931) that each of the initial 13 titles featured "the champions of every sport" Bert Frank, who worked on Ripley's Believe It or Not! series for Warner, handled the editing at the Vitaphone studios in New York.

Turner Classic Movies occasionally airs these, giving modern TV viewers a glimpse at the world of Depression Era sports.

== List of films ==
Specific dates listed below are the Film Daily reviews, close to the time of their release.

Title	Vitaphone number	Release date	Synopsis	Notes
Sport Slants #1	1218	June 14, 1931	wrestlers Frank Judson & Clevio Massimo / hockey with Lester Patrick & the NY Rangers / gymnasts Al Jochim & Adelaide Meyers / Buck Freeman & St. Johns (NY) basketball	TCM listing
Sport Slants #2	1240/1264	August 1931	fencing with George Santelli & Norman Cohn (among others) / Dick Glendon and Columbia University rowing	TCM listing
Sport Slants #3	1272	November 22, 1931	sport of cricket / Long Island sailing regatta / polo in Westbury International Field	TCM listing
Sport Slants #4	1306	December 1931	field hockey / soccer / Ireland hurling	reviewed by Film Daily, February 14, 1932
Sport Slants #5	1330	February 7, 1932	bowling & wrestling with Walter L. Richard & Joe Felcaro	TCM listing
Sport Slants #6-7	1347/1360	March 27, 1932	boxers Tony Canzoneri & Teddy Martin / Ralph Greenleaf & other champions at billiards	skipped a number in title card, TCM listing
Sport Slants #8	1382	July 2, 1932	Greyhound racing / diving off Florida with Pete Desjardins	
Sport Slants #9	1393	July 9, 1932	Florida water sports / alligator wrestling	
Sport Slants #10	1402	July 19, 1932	Jai alai / deep sea fishing	TCM listing
Sport Slants #11	1409	August 9, 1932	features Olympic hopefuls	TCM listing
Sport Slants #12	1425	August 1932	cockfighting / catching swordfish	TCM listing
Sport Slants #13	1426	September 1932	champion child golfer / outboard motor & steeplechase racing	TCM listing
Sport Thrills #1	1448	September 24, 1932	Willard Rogers in ping-pong / swimmers Katherine Rawls & Eleanor Holm / Bill Heckman in handball	
Sport Thrills #2	1449	October 1932, © January 3, 1933	more fishing / Scandinavian Skijoring / harness racing	
Sport Thrills #3	1489	October 29, 1932	Pendleton, Oregon rodeo / bicycles	
Sport Thrills #4	1446	© February 13, 1933	silent film footage of past athletes including Annette Kellerman	
Sport Thrills #6	1505	© February 23, 1933	hunting game birds	
Sport Thrills #5	1515	© March 22, 1933	moose hunting / Irish Hurling	

== See also ==
- List of short subjects by Hollywood studio#Warner Brothers

== Links ==
- "Film Daily archives". The Online Books Page.
- Ted Husing film credits on IMDb.com
