= Big Time Vaudeville =

Short film series

Big Time Vaudeville was a series of black-and-white 9- to 10-minute short films resembling the Vitaphone Varieties and also produced by Warner Brothers and Vitaphone (at the Brooklyn studios in New York). These consisted of four to six vaudeville acts and are historically interesting with many performers rarely seen on film.

== Overview ==
In 1934, Warner Bros. released four Pepper Pots titled “Vaudeville Reel” that featured several acrobatic acts, dancers, singers and comedians appearing on a stage, much like a vaudeville show. Their success prompted the studio to fashion a new series using the same set-up.

Since few of the performers appearing in these became household names, they were seldom reissued after their initial run and were rarely seen on television. The more familiar performers also appeared in other Vitaphone-Warner shorts, including the eccentric Chaz Chase, Eddie Peabody and a pre-radio Edgar Bergen. The latter starred in the most frequently shown today title, Bring on the Girls, with both he and “dummy” Charlie McCarthy commenting on the different acts.

== List of titles ==
A listing of titles, with Joseph Henabery handling several as director, and Samuel Sax producing:

Title	Release, or copyright date	Performers
Vitaphone Casino (All Star Vaudeville / Vaudeville Reel #5)	© June 22, 1935	features Paul Duke, Babs Ryan & Brothers, Buster West, the Radio Rubes; (filmed October 1934)
Vitaphone Varieties	November 16, 1935	Six Symphonettes, Al Loyal's Stallions, Louis Prima & Hal Sherman
Vitaphone Headliners	December 4, 1935	Nick Lucas, 4 Mullen Sisters, Eddie Stuart, O'Donnell & Blair
Vitaphone Troupers	January 4, 1936	Four Trojans, Aunt Jemima (Tess Gardella), Benny Ross & Maxine Stone, the Buccaneers
Vitaphone Billboard	February 15, 1936	Liazeed Arabs, Jane Lee & Katherine Lee, the Keller Sisters & Lynch, Joe Peanuts
Vitaphone Celebrities	© March 2, 1936	James Evans, the Remington Singers, Clifford & Marion, Florence Mayo & Pansy
Vitaphone Spotlight	March 7, 1936	the Five Elgins, the Balabanow Accordion Revue, Frank Conville, Helen Reynolds & her Skating Champions
Vitaphone Highlights	April 4, 1936	Ferry Conway, Kingsley & Case, Eddie Peabody, Monroe & Grant
Vitaphone Hippodrome	© May 11, 1936	the Kluting's Entertainers (animal act), Johnny Lee & 3 Sees, Molly Picon, the Michon Brothers
Vitaphone Entertainers	© July 28, 1936	Sylvia Foos, Gautier's Toy Shop, Hunter & Percival, Mangan's Internationals
Vitaphone Topnotchers	© August 8, 1936	Ben Bayer, the Three Marshalls, the Six Danvilles, Charles Kemper & Company
Vitaphone Gayeties	September 15, 1936	Jack Pepper, the DeLong Sisters, Allen & Kent, Will Morris & Bobby
Vitaphone Internationals	October 27, 1936	Pallenberg's Doberman Pinschers (dog act), Holtz & Lee, Ming & Toy, Berke's Country Boys, The Three Rayes
Vaudeville Is Back	November 14, 1936	John Perkins, 4 Creeden Girls, Jane & Joe McKenna, the Maxelos
Vitaphone Stage Show	© December 7, 1936	Pallenberg's bicycle riding bears, Four Comets (skaters), Landt Trio & White, Nash & Fately
Vaud-Villains	December 23, 1936	Marty May, the Three Wiles, the Kitaros, Rose King
Reel Vaudeville	January 23, 1937	Harry Rose, Three Queens, Carroll & Howe, Bee Hee Rubyatee Troupe
Bedtime Vaudeville	January 30, 1937	Eddie Grady, Joyce Haber & Budy Matthews, Wesley Catri, Dickie Monahan, Muriel Weber; (filmed January 1936, held over a year)
Bring on the Girls	March 6, 1937	Edgar Bergen (& Charlie McCarthy), Jerry Goff, Jack Kerr, Torelli's Circus animals & Alice Murphy's Quintuplets
Vitaphone Diversions	April 3, 1937	Five Juggling Jewels, Dave Monahan, Brown, Rich & Hall, Smith & Dale
Nickel Low-Down	May 1, 1937	Charles Kemper & Stooges, Paul Robinson & the Horton Boys, Dunn Brothers & Dotty, Le Paul
Vitaphone Funsters	May 29, 1937	the Three Swifts, Andy & Louise Carr, Johnny Burke, the Three Reddingtons
Vaude-Festival	June 26, 1937	Je Biviano, Bob Dupont, Ross & Bennett, Fritz & Jean Hubert
Vaudeville Hits	July 10, 1937	Lee Manning & Mitzi, the Byrne Sisters, Jules & Clifton, Elaine Arden & Company
Vitaphone Broadwayites	August 21, 1937	La Varre & Brother, Chester Fredericks & LaNelle Avery, Medley & Duprey, the Muriel Abbott Dancers

== See also ==
- Vitaphone Varieties
- List of short subjects by Hollywood studio#Warner Brothers
