= Radio City Revels =

1938 film by Benjamin Stoloff

- Directed by: Benjamin Stoloff
- Written by: Eddie Davis; Matt Brooks; Anthony Veiller; Mortimer Offner
- Produced by: Edward Kaufman
- Starring: Bob Burns; Jack Oakie; Ann Miller
- Cinematography: J. Roy Hunt; Jack MacKenzie
- Edited by: Arthur Roberts
- Music by: Robert Russell Bennett (uncredited)
- Production company: RKO Pictures
- Distributed by: RKO Radio Pictures
- Release date: February 11, 1938
- Running time: 90 minutes
- Country: United States
- Language: English
- Budget: $810,000
- Box office: $750,000

Radio City Revels is a 1938 American musical comedy film directed by Benjamin Stoloff and starring Bob Burns, Jack Oakie and Ann Miller.

== Plot ==
An aspiring writer arrives in New York and composes musical masterpieces in his sleep. A struggling songwriting team appropriates his work, publishing major hits under their own names.

== Cast ==
- Bob Burns as Lester Robin
- Jack Oakie as Harry Miller
- Kenny Baker as Kenny Baker
- Ann Miller as Billie Shaw
- Victor Moore as Paul Plummer
- Milton Berle as Teddy Jordan
- Helen Broderick as Gertie Shaw
- Jane Froman as Jane Froman
- Buster West as Squenchy
- Melissa Mason as Lisa
- Richard Lane as Crane
- Marilyn Vernon as Delia Robin
- Charles Coleman as The Butler
- Don Wilson as Don Wilson - Radio Station Announcer
- Hal Kemp and His Orchestra as Themselves
- William Brisbane as Mr. Ipswich
- Rosalind Marquis as Singer
- Kirby Grant as Singer
- Bobby Barber as Waiter

== Production ==
Although set in New York City, specifically at Radio City, much of the film was shot at RKO's California studios. The company had originally planned to make the film in 1934 with Fred Astaire and Ginger Rogers. In 1937 the project was revived and scheduled as a Wheeler and Woolsey musical comedy, to follow the team's film High Flyers, but Woolsey's terminal illness forced him off the screen when High Flyers was completed. The sets for Radio City Revels had been built and the film had already been announced, so RKO quickly recast the project and made the film.

== Reception ==
According to RKO records, the film posted a loss of $300,000. It got a mixed reception from critics at Variety and The New York Times, who praised the work of rising star Ann Miller but were negative about other aspects of the film.
