= Lyman H. Howe =

American film director

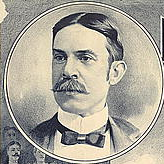
- Image of Howe cropped from an advertisement for one of his shows
- Born: June 6, 1856; Wilkes-Barre, Pennsylvania, U.S.
- Died: January 30, 1923 (aged 66); Brookline, Massachusetts, U.S.
- Occupations: Entertainer, filmmaker

Signature
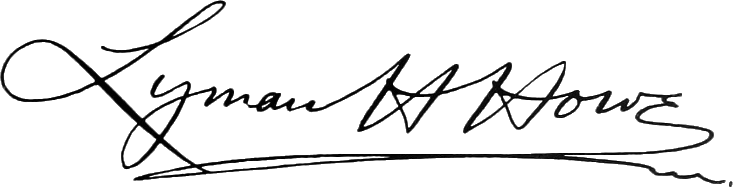

Lyman Hakes Howe (June 6, 1856 – January 30, 1923) was an American entertainer, motion picture exhibitor and early filmmaker. He entered the entertainment industry in 1883, and began touring with a phonograph in 1890. He showed his first movies in 1896. He was the first person to use a phonograph for background sound effects in movies.

== Early life and education ==
Howe was born in Wilkes Barre, Pennsylvania to Nathan Howe, a building contractor, and Margaret Robins (Howe)––the youngest of eight children. He attended Wyoming Academy, a secondary preparatory and business school, for two years and then started a business as a house and sign painter with a friend. He soon became a traveling salesman. After his father's death and the 1873 financial panic left the family near bankruptcy, he became a brakeman for the Central Railroad of New Jersey.

== Career ==
=== Early career ===
In 1883, Howe entered the entertainment industry with Robert M. Colborn. The partners bought a miniature working model of a coal mine and showed it in Pennsylvania towns and Baltimore's Masonic Temple, where it did little business. Howe bought out his partner's share and made arrangements to exhibit the miniature during the summer months at Glen Onoko in Mauch Chunk (now Jim Thorpe, Pennsylvania). It was a part-time career. In the winter months he returned to his earlier work as a painter. In 1890, he and a Mr. Haddock bought a phonograph, which they demonstrated to the people of northeastern Pennsylvania, opening in Scranton on March 10, 1890. He exhibited the miniature coal breaker that summer but returned to giving phonograph concerts in the fall, this time without his partner. He sold the model coal mine and for the next several years toured with the phonograph. During this time, he began styling himself as "Professor" or "Lecturer". Howe was among the first to give full-length phonograph concerts.

=== Film career ===
During the 1890s, Howe attempted to acquire a kinetoscope from Thomas Edison, but was unsuccessful in doing so. In 1896, he attempted to lease a vitascope from Raff & Gammon, but was again unsuccessful. He thus created his own projector, the animotiscope with the help of an electrician. The animotiscope improved on previous motion picture projectors by incorporating a second take-up reel, allowing for the showing of longer films. Howe showed his first movie in Wilkes-Barre in December 1896. This movie was based on some of Thomas Edison's films and incorporated a phonograph for sound effects. Howe continued to show films, most of which were newsreels, local movies, and travelogues. There was a time when he used both the phonograph and his movies during his shows, but he eventually concentrated mostly on movies. He was creating his own travelogues and newsreels by 1901. He was also the first person to incorporate backstage sound effects in his movies.

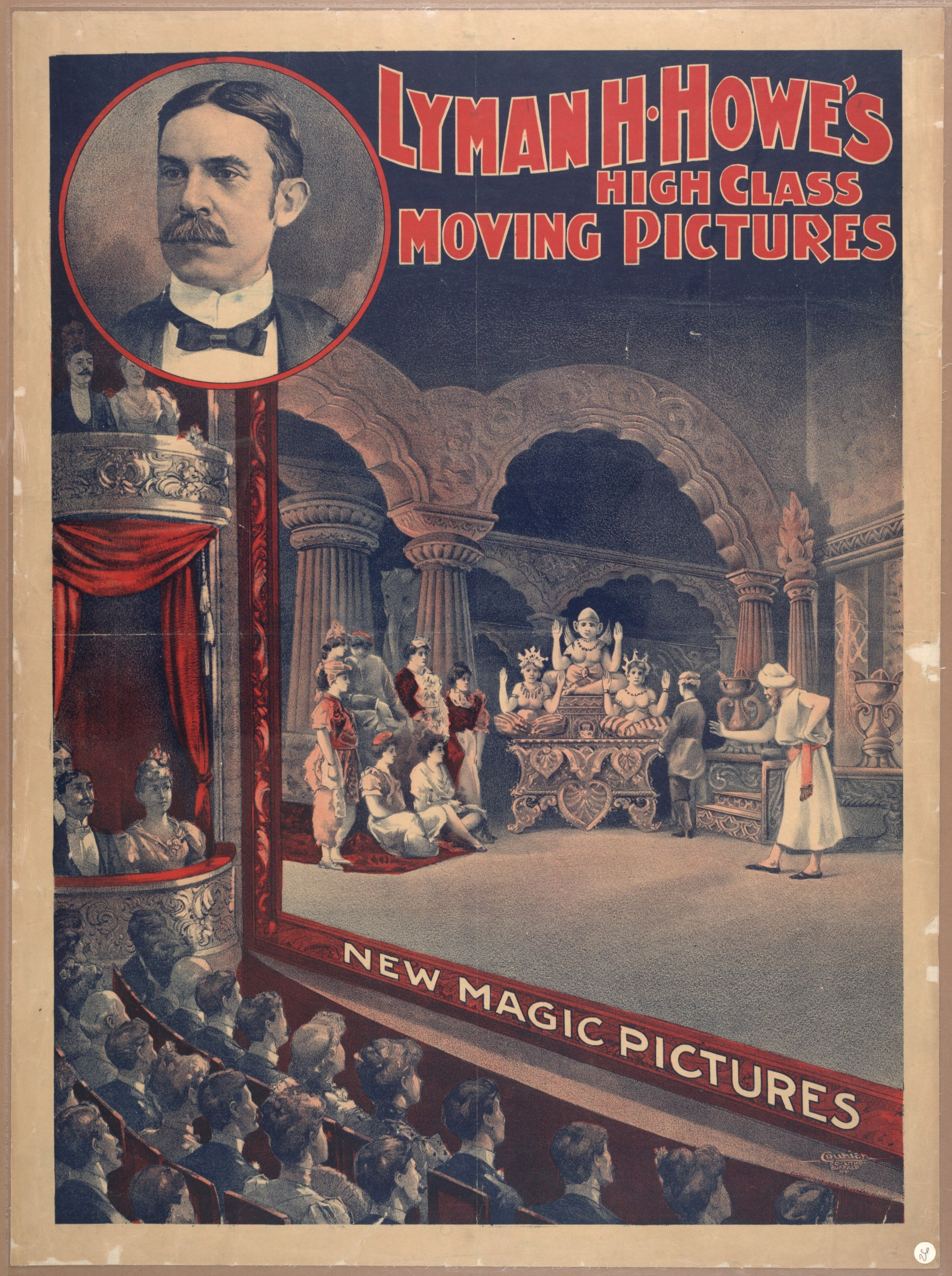
An advertisement for Lyman H. Howe's "High-Class moving pictures"

Howe's movies were well received by the public. Venues were often filled when he showed his movie. By 1903, he controlled six traveling movie companies based in Wilkes-Barre. Although most of his competitors went out of business with the rise of nickelodeons around 1905, Howe's film company continued to operate, primarily focusing on large cities. Howe, along with Burton Holmes and Fred Niblo, was invited to participate in the Motion Picture Patents Company in October 1909. From 1912 to 1919, he was active in the United States and Canada.

In the 1910s, Howe made films about the industry, and made war films during World War I. Howe was involved in making films from a flying airplane as early as 1911.

One of Howe's films was Lyman H. Howe's Famous Ride on a Runaway Train, which was made in 1921. It was filmed from a moving train on a steep slope, producing a vertiginous affect, which influenced This Is Cinerama.

From 1922 to 1929, Howe produced a cartoon series called Hodge Podge.

Howe's circuit has been described as "quasi-Chautauqua".

Howe termed his films "high class" films. Specific examples of topics of his movies included the Olympic Games and the wedding of King Alfonso XIII of Spain. He also filmed the United States President Theodore Roosevelt's visit to Wilkes-Barre in 1905.

=== Other work ===
Howe trained the showman Edwin J. Hadley.

== Death and legacy ==
Howe died on January 30, 1923, at the age of 66. His company continued to operate as a film laboratory after his death and into the 1930s, during which time it produced short films about the Great Depression.

A Pennsylvania state historical marker in Howe's honor was dedicated on September 18, 2000 in Wilkes-Barre, where he was born and spent most of his life.

In the 2010s, Howe's 1921 film Lyman H. Howe's Famous Ride on a Runaway Train turned up in the New Zealand Film Archive.

Howe was posthumously inducted into the Luzerne County Arts & Entertainment Hall of Fame in 2025.

== See also ==
- Burton Holmes
