= Buster West =

American actor

James "Buster" West
- Born: James West; March 31, 1901; Philadelphia, Pennsylvania, U.S.
- Died: March 19, 1966 (aged 64); Encino, California, U.S.
- Occupations: Actor; Dancer
- Years active: 1924-1964
- Spouse: Lucille Page (1913-64)

James "Buster" West (31 March 1901 – 19 March 1966) was an American dancer and actor who was a featured performer in vaudeville, the Broadway stage, motion pictures and television. West was known as being one of those performers who was "born in a suitcase", as his father John West and mother were both vaudeville performers and he performed with them as a child.

== Career ==
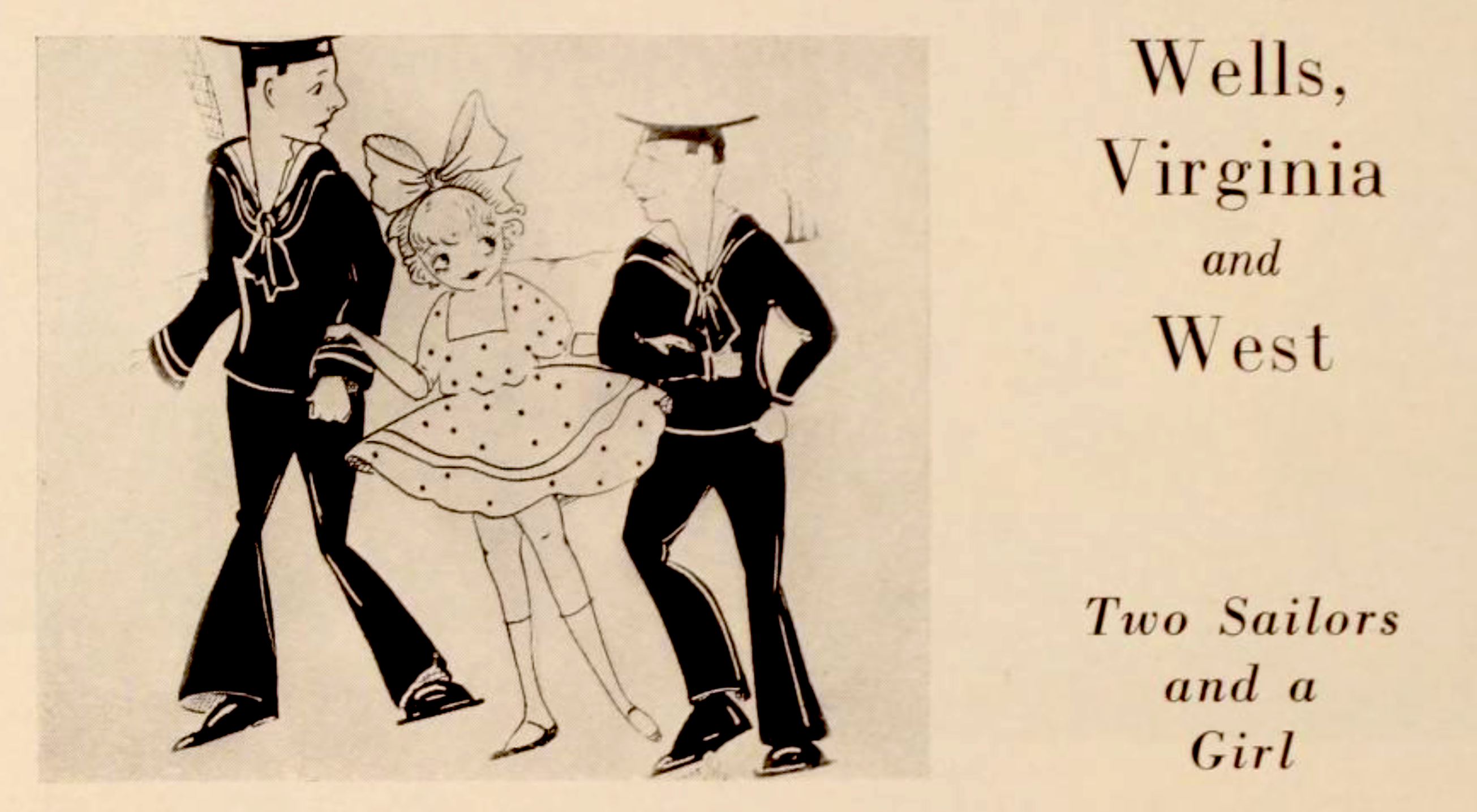
1923 advertisement for the vaudeville act Wells, Virginia, and West with whom West began his career

Buster West achieved success in vaudeville and the legitimate stage as an eccentric dancer, and he made his film debut as himself in a cameo in Broadway After Dark (1924). He achieved his breakthrough in the Broadway musical revue George White's Scandals of 1926.

== Buster West and Tom Patricola ==
One of the stars of that show was another eccentric dancer, Tom Patricola. In 1934 Educational Pictures signed West and Patricola to star in short comedies filmed in New York. West and Patricola's first short was Hello Sailors (1934), and from then on West and Patricola played sailors in their two-reelers. West and Patricola might have continued with Educational, but the company discontinued production in late 1937 due to financial problems; the final West-Patricola shorts were released in 1938.

== Solo performer ==
Buster West appeared in only three more films, each time as a specialty performer: New Faces of 1937; Radio City Revels (1938) replacing Bert Wheeler, recently released by the studio; and The Last Bandit (1949).

Buster West's television career consisted of two appearances as a dancer on The Frank Sinatra Show in 1951, and he appeared in single episodes on Alfred Hitchcock Presents ("Starring the Defense", 1963) and The Lucy Show.

In 1944, he co-starred with Jackie Gleason in the musical Follow the Girls, a smash hit that ran for 888 performances. His next (and last) Broadway appearance was as the lead in another smash, The Pajama Game, replacing Eddie Foy Jr. until the end of the run in 1956.

== Personal life ==
West was married to the acrobatic dancer and film actress Lucille Page, with whom he appeared in vaudeville in Berdell and Wellington and in the short Moonlight and Melody (1935). Lucille died in 1964, while Buster died in 1966 from brain cancer. He was buried at Forest Lawn Memorial Park (Hollywood Hills) in the Hollywood Hills neighborhood of Los Angeles, California.
