= Burton Holmes =

American traveler and filmmaker (1870–1958)

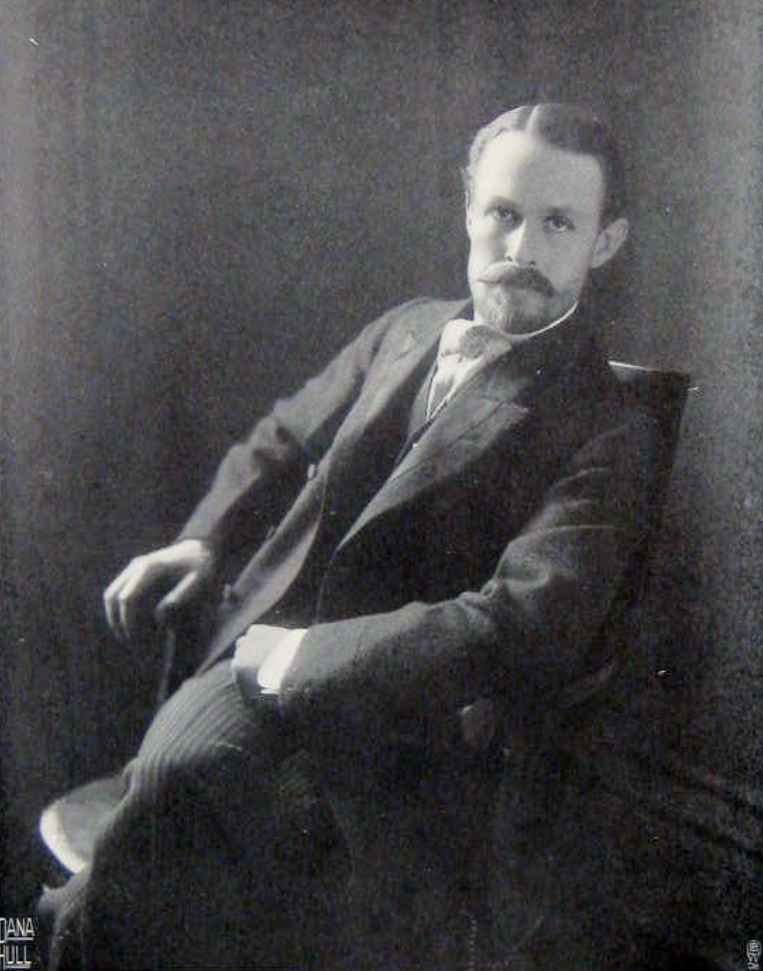
- Holmes, c. 1905
- Born: Elias Burton Holmes; January 8, 1870; Chicago, Illinois, U.S.
- Died: July 22, 1958 (aged 88); Los Angeles, California, U.S.
- Occupation: Travel lecturer

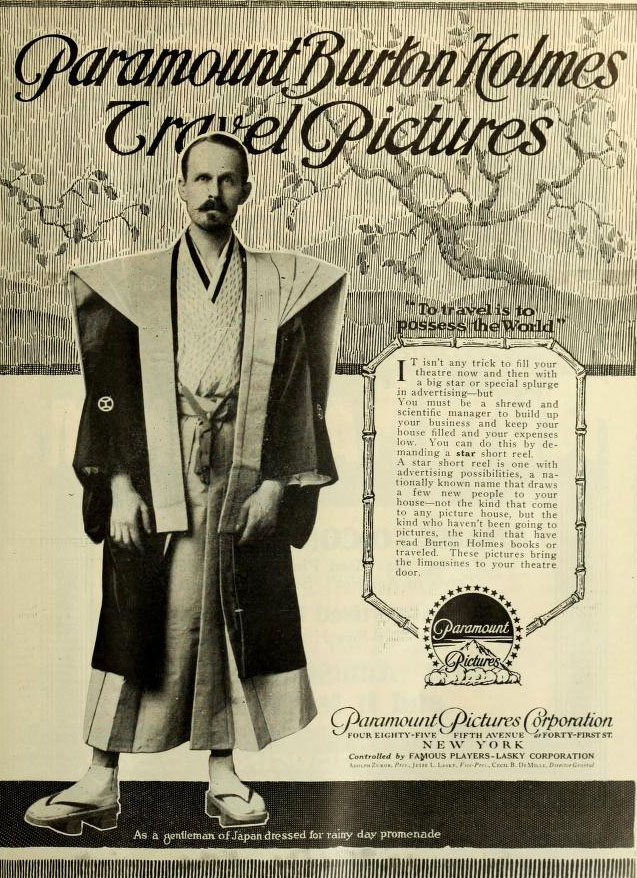
Advertisement (1917)

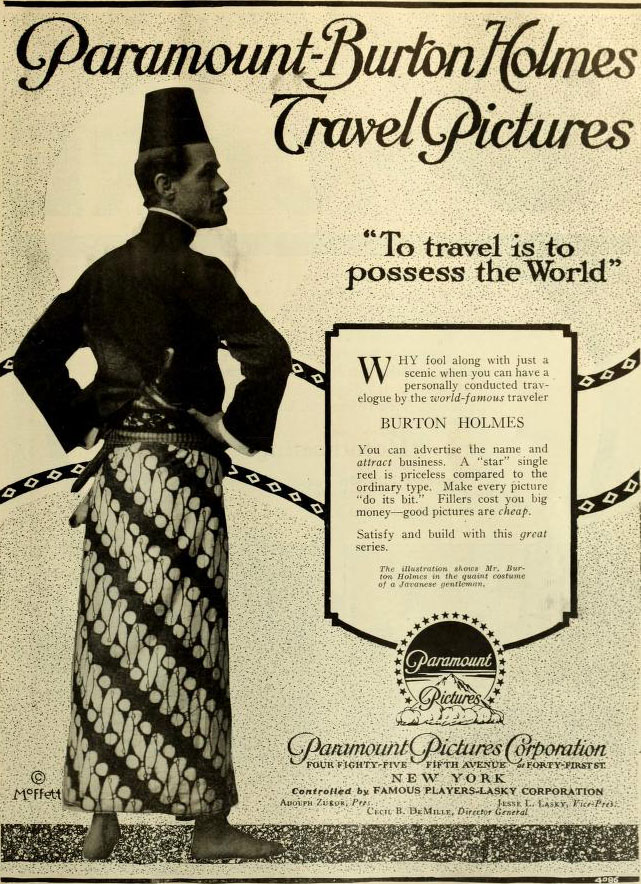
Advertisement (1917)

Elias Burton Holmes (January 8, 1870 – July 22, 1958) was an American traveler, photographer and filmmaker credited with the invention of the "travelogue", though the term itself was apparently coined in 1898 by John Bowker. Travel stories, slide shows, and motion pictures were all in existence before Holmes began his career, as was the profession of travel lecturer; but Holmes was the first person to put all of these elements together into documentary travel lectures. He recorded the earliest known footage of Japan and Korea, in 1899.

== Early years ==
Elias Burton Holmes was born into a middle-class Chicago family, the son of a banker. His interest in travel was sparked at the age of nine when his grandmother took him to hear a then-famous travel lecturer, John L. Stoddard (whom Holmes was to meet on a subsequent trip abroad).

In 1890, Holmes accompanied his grandmother on a trip to Europe and when he returned showed slides of his trip at the Chicago Camera Club, of which he was a member. Holmes wrote of this event: "To take the edge off the silence, to keep the show moving, I wrote an account of my journey and read it, as the stereopticon man changed slides."

Despite the success of this event, which grossed $350 for the club, it was not until several years later that Holmes decided to set himself up as a travel lecturer. In 1893, after sending out 2,000 invitations to a select group of people from Chicago, Holmes gave two sold-out talks about a recent trip to Japan.

== Travelogues ==
Initially Holmes had only modest success as a travel lecturer. Then in 1897, John L. Stoddard retired, creating something of a vacuum in the field. Around the same time, Holmes began to supplement his hand-colored glass slides with the then excitingly new technology of moving pictures. As the years went on, film came increasingly to dominate his lectures.

In the years that followed, Holmes traveled extensively: North and South America, Europe, Russia, India, Ethiopia and Burma (now Myanmar). He lectured about such topics as the Panama Canal, the "Frivolities of Paris", even the adventures of Richard Halliburton, one of his competitors in the travel lecture profession. He visited the first modern Olympics in 1896, rode the first trans-Siberian train, and shot what may be the first movies ever made of Japan, in 1899, as well as the first recorded video footage of Korea. In the course of his travels, he crossed the Atlantic and Pacific oceans more than 50 times. As Holmes became more well-known, he brought along assistants, such as Andre de la Varre, to shoot film and stills while he made notes for his lectures, and he also employed a business manager. With the rise of Hollywood, Holmes began to make short travel films for Paramount and later Metro-Goldwyn-Mayer.

Holmes's talks—which totaled over 8,000 by the end of his life—drew their largest audiences in cosmopolitan cities like New York, Boston, and Philadelphia. He catered especially to the armchair traveler with escapist fantasies, and for this reason he consciously focused his lectures on the most agreeable and scenic aspects of the places he lectured about. He avoided all discussion of politics, poverty, and other social ills.

== Personal life ==
In 1914, Holmes married Margaret Oliver, whom he had met on one of his expeditions. They lived primarily at an estate called "Topside" in the Hollywood Hills that was a former riding club. Holmes also had a duplex, "Nirvana", in New York that was packed with treasures from Southeast Asia; this he eventually sold to Robert Ripley.

== Legacy ==
Burton Holmes has a star on the Hollywood Walk of Fame. In 2004, 200 reels of Holmes's documentary footage, long thought lost, turned up in an abandoned storage unit. They are currently housed in the George Eastman House film museum.

== See also ==
- Lyman Hakes Howe

== Bibliography ==
Works by Holmes

- The Burton Holmes Lectures, Battle Creek, Michigan: Little-Preston, 1901, OCLC 5082081. v.1, v.5, v.9
- The Olympian Games in Athens, 1896: The First Modern Olympics. Grove/Atlantic, Incorporated. 1920. ISBN 978-0-394-62115-9.
- A Trip Around the World Through the Telebinocular, Keystone View Company, 1926
- The Traveler's Russia, G.P. Putnam's Sons, 1934.
- The World Is Mine, Culver City, California: Murray & Gee, 1953.

Works about Holmes

- Holmes, Burton; Taschen, Benedikt; Caldwell, Genoa (2006). Burton Holmes Travelogues: The Greatest Traveler of His Time, 1892-1952. Taschen. ISBN 978-3-8228-4815-9.
- Caldwell, Genoa (1977). The Man who Photographed the World: Burton Holmes, Travelogues. H.N. Abrams. ISBN 978-0-8109-1059-1.
- Roan, Jeanette (2010). ""To travel is to possess the world": The Illustrated Travel Lectures of E. Burton Holmes". Envisioning Asia: On Location, Travel, and the Cinematic Geography of U.S. Orientalism. Ann Arbor, Michigan: University of Michigan Press. pp. 27–68. ISBN 978-0-472-05083-3. OCLC 671655107 – via Project MUSE.
- Soule, Thayer (2003). On the Road with Travelogues: 1935-1995 a Sixty-Year Romp. 1st Books Library. ISBN 978-1-4107-9971-5.
- Wallace, Irving. "Everybody's Rover Boy." In The Sunday Gentleman. New York: Simon & Schuster, 1965.
- Stockham, Ed. "Burton Holmes", song, 2015.
