= Sexton Blake (1928 serial) =

1928 film

- Directed by: George A. Cooper; George J. Banfield; Leslie Eveleigh
- Based on: Sexton Blake
- Starring: Langhorne Burton; Mickey Brantford
- Production company: British Filmcraft
- Release date: 1928
- Running time: 6 short films
- Country: United Kingdom
- Languages: Silent, with English intertitles

Sexton Blake is a 1928 six-part silent film serial produced by British Filmcraft. The serial stars Langhorne Burton as the fictional detective Sexton Blake, and Mickey Brantford as his assistant Tinker.

Some films have survived and are kept in the Huntley Film Archives.

== Films ==
All films feature Langhorne Burton as Sexton Blake and Mickey Brantford as Tinker. Mrs. Bardell (Mrs. Fred Emney) appears in Silken Threads and The Mystery of the Silent Death.

=== 1. The Clue of the Second Goblet ===
Directed by George A. Cooper. Based on the 1927 novel of the same name by G. H. Teed.

- Fred Raynham as George Marsden Plummer

=== 2. Blake the Lawbreaker ===
Directed by George A. Cooper.

- Fred Raynham (as George Marsden Plummer?)

=== 3. Sexton Blake, Gambler ===
Directed by George J. Banfield.

- Marjorie Hume as Joan Fairfield
- Frank Atherley as Lord Fairfield
- Adeline Hayden Coffin as Lady Fairfield

=== 4. Silken Threads ===
Directed by Leslie Eveleigh.

Mr. Stormcroft (Leslie Perrins) visits Blake after his father was murdered in their West End mansion, where many female guests are staying. His father was shot in his library when most guests were in the drawing room. A search did not turn up a gun or revolver. Arriving at the library, Tinker discovers a piece of silken cloth stuck in a corner of the chair, and Blake notices scratch marks on the desk. The assailant must have been a woman! Blake breaks into the house several days later to examine the women's wardrobe, where he finds a dress that matches the cloth. Returning to the library, he discovers that Stormcroft's father, an English secret agent, had a secret drawer in his desk. He also finds the gun which looks like a walking stick. Just as he begins to call the police, the villainess, Valerie Simpson (Marjorie Hume), renders him unconscious with a smash on the head, but her escape is thwarted by Tinker and the policemen who arrive to check on Blake. Blake wakes up and tells Mrs. Stormcroft that Valerie is not the daughter of an old friend, but a Soviet agent named Nadia Petrowskaya. He has discovered a letter (conveniently written in English) addressed to "Sovian [sic] Headquarters" in her locked box. She shot the old man when the latter refused to give her an important document.

=== 5. The Great Office Mystery ===
Director unknown. Based on the 1917 novel of the same name by Jack Lewis.

- Ronald Curtis as Leon Kestrel

=== 6. The Mystery of the Silent Death ===
Directed by Leslie Eveleigh. Possibly based on The Menace of the Silent Death (1926) by E. J. Murray?

- Roy Travers as Mr. Reece

== Reception ==
Viewing two films several decades after their initial release, Norman Wright judged Silken Threads "ghastly" and The Clue of the Second Goblet "a little better — just a little."
