= Jean Paul King =

American actor

- Born: December 1, 1904
- Died: August 21, 1965 (aged 60)

Jean Paul King (December 1, 1904 – 1965) was an American announcer and actor.

== Early years ==
Born in North Bend, Nebraska, on December 1, 1904, King was the son of Mr. and Mrs. E. B. King. After growing up in Tacoma, Washington, he attended Miami University in Oxford, Ohio, for two years before transferring to the University of Washington, from which he graduated in 1926. At UW, he was active in the University Players, glee club, and sports. He was a member of the United States Navy Air Corps during World War II.

== Career ==
King began acting with a stock theater company while he was a college student and went on to other theatrical productions until he became active in radio. Troupes with which he worked included the Henry Duffy players in Oakland.

=== Radio ===
King was promoted from announcer on a radio drama in San Francisco to be the head announcer for NBC's West Coast network. From that position he went to work at KGW in Portland, KHQ in Spokane, and WLW in Cincinnati. He next became an NBC announcer in Chicago in August 1930.

On network radio, King was the leading man on Romance, Inc. and was the master of ceremonies for Saturday Night Party. Programs for which he was the announcer included Ziegfeld Follies of the Air, The Lanny Ross Show, Palmolive Beauty Box Theater, Myrt and Marge, Clara, Lu, and Em, The Shadow, Gang Busters, John's Other Wife, The Lamplighter, and The Voice of Experience.

King was named program director of radio station KDYL in Salt Lake City, Utah, on February 11, 1950. He also had a daily 30-minute program on that station.

=== Other professional activities ===
King was the narrator of Metro-Goldwyn-Mayer newsreels for two years. He also narrated the Vitaphone films Mechanix Illustrated (no. 2) (1938) and Northern Lights (1936) and some Warner Bros. travelogues, beginning with Sweden (1936). He appeared on television in the episodes "Up Jumped the Devil" on The Dick Powell Show, "Who Killed April?" on Burke's Law (1964).

King was director of public relations for the Buckley-King company in Tacoma, and he was a writer who contributed articles to Radio Digest and other magazines.

== Personal life ==
On November 22, 1928, King married radio writer Mary Cogswell and they had a son.
