= Donald MacBride =

American actor (1893–1957)

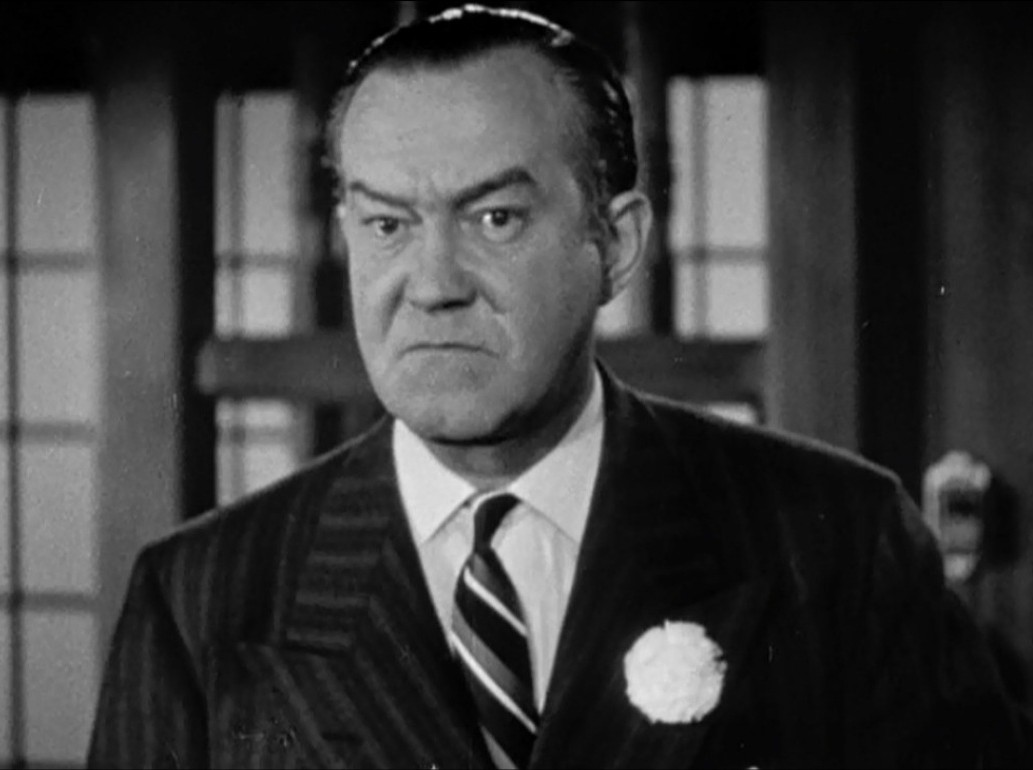
- MacBride in the trailer for My Favorite Wife (1940)
- Born: Donald Hugh MacBride; June 23, 1893; Brooklyn, New York, U.S.
- Died: June 21, 1957 (aged 63); Los Angeles, California, U.S.
- Resting place: Holy Cross Cemetery, Culver City
- Occupation: Actor
- Years active: 1914–1955
- Spouse: Esther MacBride (m. 1930)

Donald Hugh MacBride (June 23, 1893 – June 21, 1957) was a prominent American character actor on stage, films, and television. Starting in vaudeville, he went on to appear in nearly 140 films between 1914 and 1955. His credits include Northwest Passage (1940), My Favorite Wife (1940), High Sierra (1941), The Glass Key (1942), and The Killers (1946), and the final film was The Seven Year Itch (1955).

== Early life ==
MacBride was born 1893 in Brooklyn, New York. His year of birth is given variously as 1889 or 1893 in the standard reference books. He launched his entertainment career as the leader of the choir at St Thomas Fifth Avenue and Garden City Cathedral in New York. As a teenager, he recorded the earliest example of a solo recording by a chorister from the United States, on November 15,1907, singing Handel's 'Angels Ever Bright and Fair'.

== Career ==
=== Motion pictures ===
Beginning in 1930, like many New York-based, stage-trained actors, he found work at the Paramount, Vitaphone, and Educational studios, all of which had East Coast branches. He is clearly visible as a crowd extra welcoming Groucho Marx in the Paramount feature Animal Crackers. Speaking roles in short subjects followed which established MacBride as a comic tough guy or villain opposite Tom Howard, Shemp Howard, Buster Keaton, and other comedy stars.

MacBride's fortunes improved when he was featured in the hit play, Room Service. In this farce comedy about a shoestring producer and his desperate associates trying to avoid eviction from a hotel, MacBride played the no-nonsense hotel manager, who frequently met bad news with an explosive "Oh, God damn!"

RKO Radio Pictures bought the film rights to Room Service as a vehicle for The Marx Brothers, and brought many of the Broadway cast members to Hollywood, including Donald MacBride where he reprised his role (with his catchphrase sanitized to "Jumping butterballs!").

Hollywood producers noticed MacBride's comic timing and he was established overnight as a skilled character actor. Like fellow character actor and comedian Edgar Kennedy, MacBride specialized in the comedy of frustration, and his portrayals showed the harried MacBride enduring various indignities patiently and yet progressively reaching his boiling point. He often played police inspectors, detectives, military officers, and other authority figures, all of whom were tormented by the leading players in the films.

MacBride signed a non-exclusive RKO contract, allowing him to freelance among the major studios for the next several years. In 1947, with the larger studios cutting down on the number of films in production, MacBride accepted featured roles at smaller studios: Monogram, Republic, and Lippert. He continued to work at the larger studios, but often in smaller or uncredited roles.

MacBride was an early arrival in the new field of television, having appeared in the pioneering series Public Prosecutor in 1947. He continued to work in television until shortly before his death.

== Death ==
MacBride died on June 21, 1957 in Los Angeles, California, of a heart ailment. Survivors included his wife and a stepson, Jack Craddock.

== Selected filmography ==
- The Daring of Diana (1916) - Jimmy Towne
- Hesper of the Mountains (1916) - Baker
- The Fettered Woman (1917) - Jack Wolver
- The Shell Game (1918) - Vocal Teacher
- The Capitol (1919) - Jimmy Vincent
- Animal Crackers (1930) - House Party Guest (uncredited)
- His Woman (1931) - Crewman (uncredited)
- Wayward (1932) - Taxicab Driver (uncredited)
- Misleading Lady (1932) - Bill - Asylum Guard
- Buzzin' Around (1933, Short) - Policeman (uncredited)
- Moonlight and Pretzels (1933) - Business Associate (uncredited)
- Get That Venus (1933) - (uncredited)
- The Chemist (1936, Short) - Gangster
- Room Service (1938) - Gregory Wagner
- Annabel Takes a Tour (1938) - Thompson, RR Conductor
- Blondie Takes a Vacation (1938) - Harvey Morton
- The Great Man Votes (1939) - Iron Hat McCarthy
- Twelve Crowded Hours (1939) - Detective Sergeant Joe Keller
- The Story of Vernon and Irene Castle (1939) - Hotel Manager
- The Flying Irishman (1939) - Mr. Roy Thompson
- The Girl from Mexico (1939) - L. B. Renner
- The Gracie Allen Murder Case (1939) - Dist. Atty. John Markham
- The Girl and the Gambler (1939) - Mike Bascom
- Blondie Takes a Vacation (1939) - Harvey Morton
- Charlie Chan at Treasure Island (1939) - Chief J.J. Kilvaine
- The Amazing Mr. Williams (1939) - Police Lieutenant Bixler
- The Saint's Double Trouble (1940) - John Bohlen
- Northwest Passage (1940) - Sergeant McNott
- Curtain Call (1940) - Geoffrey 'Jeff' Crandall
- My Favorite Wife (1940) - Hotel Clerk
- Wyoming (1940) - Bart - Henchman (uncredited)
- Hit Parade of 1941 (1940) - Harrison
- Murder Over New York (1940) - Inspector Vance
- Michael Shayne: Private Detective (1940) - Chief Painter
- The Invisible Woman (1940) - Foghorn
- High Sierra (1941) - Big Mac
- Footlight Fever (1941) - Mr. Geoffrey 'Geoff' Crandall
- Topper Returns (1941) - Police Detective Roberts
- Love Crazy (1941) - 'Pinky' Grayson
- Here Comes Mr. Jordan (1941) - Inspector Williams
- You'll Never Get Rich (1941) - Top Sergeant
- Rise and Shine (1941) - Coach Graham
- Louisiana Purchase (1941) - Capt. Pierre Whitfield
- You're in the Army Now (1941) - Colonel Dobson
- Two Yanks in Trinidad (1942) - Sgt. Valentine
- Juke Girl (1942) - 'Muckeye' John
- Mexican Spitfire Sees a Ghost (1942) - Percy Fitzbadden
- The Glass Key (1942) - Farr
- My Sister Eileen (1942) - Officer Lonigan
- A Night to Remember (1942) - Bolling
- Lady Bodyguard (1943) - R. L. Barclay
- They Got Me Covered (1943) - Mason
- A Stranger in Town (1943) - Vinnie Z. Blaxton
- Best Foot Forward (1943) - Capt. Bradd
- The Doughgirls (1944) - Judge Franklin
- The Thin Man Goes Home (1944) - Police Chief MacGregor
- Practically Yours (1944) - Sam (uncredited)
- She Gets Her Man (1945) - Henry Wright
- Out of This World (1945) - J.C. Crawford
- Penthouse Rhythm (1945) - Brewster
- Abbott and Costello in Hollywood (1945) - Dennis Kavanaugh
- Hold That Blonde (1945) - Mr. Kratz
- Doll Face (1945) - Lawyer Ferguson
- Girl on the Spot (1946) - Inspector Gleason
- Little Giant (1946) - The conductor
- Blonde Alibi (1946) - Police Inspector Carmichael
- The Dark Corner (1946) - Policeman in Galleries (uncredited)
- The Dark Horse (1946) - John Rooney
- The Time of Their Lives (1946) - Lt. Mason
- The Killers (1946) - R.S. Kenyon
- The Brute Man (1946) - Police Captain M. J. Donelly
- Beat the Band (1947) - P. Aloysius Duff
- The Egg and I (1947) - Mr. Henty
- Buck Privates Come Home (1947) - Police Captain
- The Fabulous Joe (1947) - Lawyer Gilbert
- Joe Palooka in the Knockout (1947) - Crockett
- Good News (1947) - Coach Johnson
- Smart Politics (1948) - Phineas Wharton, Sr. / Phineas Wharton, Jr.
- Campus Sleuth (1948) - Insp. Watson
- Jinx Money (1948) - Police Capt. James Q. Broaderik
- The Story of Seabiscuit (1949) - George Carson
- Challenge to Lassie (1949)
- Joe Palooka Meets Humphrey (1950) - Mayor
- Holiday Rhythm (1950) - Earl E. Byrd
- Bowery Battalion (1951) - Sgt. Herbert Frisbie
- Cuban Fireball (1951) - Captain Brown
- Rhubarb (1951) - Pheeny
- Texas Carnival (1951) - Concessionaire #2
- The Stooge (1951) - Diner Proprietor (uncredited)
- Two Tickets to Broadway (1951) - Bus Terminal Guard Arresting Carter (uncredited)
- Sailor Beware (1952) - Chief Bos'n Mate (uncredited)
- Meet Danny Wilson (1952) - Police Desk Sergeant
- Gobs and Gals (1952) - Cmdr. J.E. Gerrens
- The Seven Year Itch (1955) - Mr. Brady (final film role)
