= Blue Blazes =

Blue Blazes may refer to:

- Blue Blazes (1936 film), an American short comedy film
- Blue Blazes (1926 film), an American silent Western film
- Blue Blazes (album), a 1994 album by Sugar Blue
- Aoi Honō (English: Blue Blazes), a Japanese coming-of-age manga series

== See also ==
- 'Blue Blazes' Rawden, a 1918 American silent drama film
- Blue blazer (disambiguation)
- Blue Blaze, a Marvel comics character
- Blazblue, a 2D fighting game series
