= Mixed Magic =

1936 film

- Directed by: Raymond Kane; Buster Keaton
- Story by: Arthur L. Jarrett; Marcy Klauber
- Produced by: E. H. Allen; E. W. Hammons
- Starring: Buster Keaton
- Cinematography: George Webber
- Production company: Educational Films
- Distributed by: 20th Century Fox
- Release date: November 20, 1936
- Running time: 18 minutes
- Country: United States
- Language: English

Mixed Magic is a 1936 American short comedy film starring Buster Keaton. It was his third in a series of three shorts for Educational Pictures shot in their Long Island, New York studio.

== Plot ==
Elmer 'Happy' Butterworth (Buster Keaton) is approached for spare change twice on the street. After giving one man a half-dollar, he is left with only a dime, which is enough for a spaghetti lunch at a local cafeteria. Inside the cafeteria, magician Professor Spumoni (Eddie Lambert) is having lunch with two of his assistants. After an argument, he fires one of them, leaving only the beautiful Mary (Marlyn Stuart). Elmer purchases a spaghetti dinner, and sits down with Mary, where he impresses the magician by revealing that he smuggled in meat under his pile of spaghetti. Professor Spumoni is so impressed that he hires Elmer to be his new assistant.

The remainder of the film takes place during a stage performance of Professor Spumoni at a circus sideshow, with Mary and Elmer as his assistants. They perform various magic tricks that all get ruined by Elmer. Throughout the show, the previously fired assistant seeks his revenge by sabotaging the performance. The audience laughs at the failed tricks, as the off-stage producer gets increasingly worried that the show is failing. He eventually cuts the show short by demanding that Professor Spumoni skip to the finale: a trick where the head of his assistant levitates above the stage. This is also ruined by Elmer (and the sabotage of the fired assistant).

Eventually, Elmer and Mary leave the stage and swing through a poster of the show. Mary closes her eyes and asks Elmer for a kiss. He closes his eyes, leans in for a kiss, but misses Mary and instead kisses the woman on the poster.

== Cast ==
- Buster Keaton as Elmer 'Happy' Butterworth
- Eddie Lambert as Professor Spumoni
- Marlyn Stuart as Mary
- Ed Hall
- Jimmie Fox (as Jimmy Fox)
- Walter Fenner
- Pass Le Noir
- Harry Myers

== Production ==
This was the third of three short films for Educational Pictures that Buster Keaton filmed in their Long Island studio. It was also his third and final film with Marlyn Stuart. This film reunited Buster with Raymond Kane, who directed Blue Blazes.

Buster Keaton was paid $5000 for his role in the film.

== Copyright Status ==
The film's copyright was renewed in 1964, and the work will enter the US public domain in 2032.

== See also ==
- Buster Keaton filmography
