= Sunshine Comedies =

Line of silent comedic short films

Sunshine Comedies is a silent film era line of comedic short films. The two-reel film series was produced by Fox Film beginning in 1916. Actors featured in the series include Slim Summerville, Billie Ritchie, Ethel Teare, and Eli Nadel (as a child). Many of the comedies are lost but some survive. They were produced from 1917 until 1925.

Comedian Al St. John appeared in and directed many of them during his three years with Fox after which he departed to work on Tuxedo Comedies (see Al St. John filmography for details).

Alice Davenport, Bobby Dunn, and Charles Lakin were among the many supporting cast members. Beginning in 1918, Winifred Westover had leading roles in some of the Sunshine Comedies opposite Hugh Fay and Jimmie Adams.

== Partial filmography ==
Her First Kiss (1919)

- The Son of a Gun (1918)
- Are Married Policemen Safe? (1918)
- Her Husband's Wife (1918)
- Her First Kiss (1919)
- His Musical Sneeze (1919)
- She Loves Me, She Loves Me Not (1920)
- Mary's Little Lobster (1920)
- Pretty Lady (1920)
- The Hayseed (1921)
- Fool Days (1921)
- The Slicker (1921)
- The Simp (1921)
- The Big Secret (1921)
- Ain't Love Grand? (1921)
- Small Town Stuff (1921)
- The Book Agent (1921)
- Fast and Furious (1921)
- The Happy Pest (1921)
- Three Good Pals (1921)
- Straight from the Farm (1922)
- A Studio Rube (1922)
- Special Delivery (1922)
- The Village Sheik (1922)
- All Wet (1922)
- The City Chap (1922)
- Out of Place (1922)
- The Alarm (1922)
- Young and Dumb (1923)
- The Salesman (1923)
- The Author (1923)
- A Tropical Romeo (1923)
- The Tailor (1923) with Victoria Louise Kerner
- Full Speed Ahead (1923)
- Slow and Sure (1923)
- Spring Fever (1923)
- Highly Recommended (1924)
- Be Yourself (1924)
- His Bitter Half (1924)
- Dumb and Daffy (1925)

== See also ==
- L-KO Kompany
- Keystone Studios
- Educational Pictures
