= E. W. Hammons =

American film producer

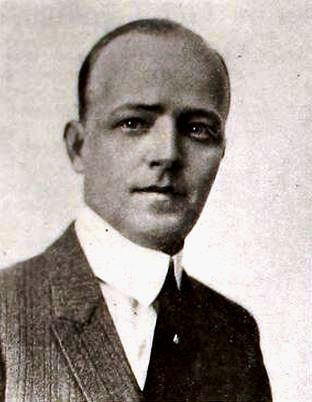
- Hammons in 1920
- Born: December 2, 1882; Winona, Mississippi, USA
- Died: July 31, 1962 (aged 79); New Rochelle, New York, USA
- Other name: Earle W. Hammons
- Years active: 1921–1962

Earle W. Hammons, known professionally as E. W. Hammons (December 2, 1882 – July 31, 1962), was an American film producer, . He produced more than 220 films between 1921 and 1938.

== Biography ==
Born in Winona, Mississippi, in 1882, Hammons founded Educational Pictures in 1915 with the intention of making educational films for schools. Hammons found that there was a larger market for short comedies in movie theaters, and shifted the firm's focus. Although Educational Pictures would continue to release occasional documentary shorts, its primary output was comedy.

Throughout the 1920s and 1930s, Educational was one of the motion picture industry's major producers of short comedies. Hammons became a highly respected film executive, and in 1938 he attempted to branch out into the lucrative feature-film market by joining forces with Grand National Pictures. The merger failed, owing to insufficient capital to operate both companies, and Hammons declared bankruptcy in 1940. He remained a consultant to the industry, associated with documentary shorts for Paramount Pictures during World War II.

Earle Hammons retained the title to Educational's corporate name, Educational Films Corporation of America. Ten years after the demise of Educational Pictures, Hammons tried to gain a foothold in the new field of commercial television, using Educational's brand name and slogan ("The Spice of the Program"): "This corporation employs men who have the experience, integrity, and the know-how of producing films and live shows for the television industry." Hammons also worked with ABC-TV in the 1950s. In 1952 Hammons and Robert M. Savini of Astor Pictures partnered to form Lion Television Corporation; Hammons continued as president of Lion until his death of a heart ailment, in New Rochelle, New York, on July 31, 1962.

For further discussion of Hammons and his studio, see Educational Pictures and Buster Keaton.

== Filmography ==
- Air Pockets (1924, with Lige Conley)
- The Iron Mule (1925, with Al St. John, directed by Roscoe Arbuckle)
- The Movies (1925, with Lloyd Hamilton, directed by Roscoe Arbuckle)
- Drama Deluxe (1927, with Lupino Lane, directed by Roscoe Arbuckle)
- Honeymooniacs (1929, with Monty Collins, directed by Jules White)
- The Right Bed (1929, with Edward Everett Horton)
- Honeymoon Trio (1931, with Al St. John, Walter Catlett, and Dorothy Granger, directed by Roscoe Arbuckle)
- Windy Riley Goes Hollywood (1931, with Jack Shutta and Louise Brooks, directed by Roscoe Arbuckle)
- Keep Laughing (1932, with Monty Collins)
- I Surrender Dear (1932, with Bing Crosby)
- Always Kickin' (1932, with Jim Thorpe and Russell Gleason)
- The Hitch Hiker (1932, with Harry Langdon and Vernon Dent)
- Two Black Crows in Africa (1933, with Moran and Mack)
- Million Dollar Melody (1933, with Lillian Roth)
- Krakatoa (1933, narrated by Graham McNamee, produced by Joe Rock)
- Dora's Dunkin' Doughnuts (1934, with Andy Clyde and Shirley Temple)
- Hotel Anchovy (1934, with The Ritz Brothers, directed by Al Christie)
- Going Spanish (1934, with Bob Hope)
- Three Cheers for Love (1934, with Sylvia Froos and Warren Hull)
- Grooms in Gloom (1935, with Tom Howard and George Shelton)
- Hail, Brother (1935, with Billy Gilbert and Shemp Howard)
- Dumb Luck (1935, with the Easy Aces)
- Mr. Widget (1935, with Joe Cook)
- Way Up Thar (1935, with Joan Davis, directed by Mack Sennett)
- Blue Blazes (1936, with Buster Keaton)
- Grand Slam Opera (1936, with Buster Keaton)
- Playboy Number One (1937, with Willie Howard)
- Montague the Magnificent (1937, with Bert Lahr)
- The Bashful Ballerina (1937, with Imogene Coca)
- Dates and Nuts (1937, with Herman Timberg Jr. and Pat Rooney Jr., and June Allyson)
- Getting an Eyeful (1938, with Danny Kaye)
- All's Fair (1938, with The Cabin Kids)
- Col. Stoopnagle's Cavalcade of Stuff #2 (1939, the final Educational comedy)
