= David Freedman =

American dramatist

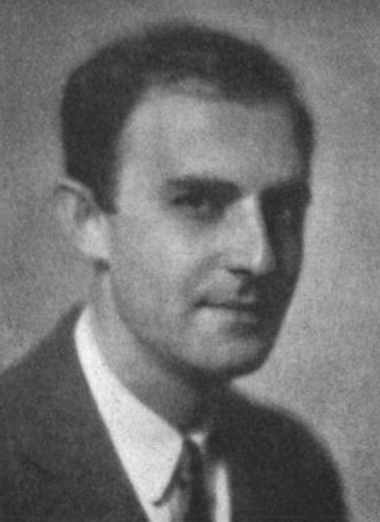
- Born: April 26, 1898; Botoșani, Romania
- Died: December 8, 1936 (aged 38); New York, New York, US
- Burial place: Mount Carmel Cemetery
- Education: City College of New York
- Occupations: Playwright, biographer
- Spouse: Beatrice Goodman (m. 1918)
- Children: 4, including Benedict, David Noel, and Toby

David Freedman (April 26, 1898 – December 8, 1936) was a Romanian-born American playwright and biographer who became known as the "King of the Gag-writers" in the early days of radio.

== Biography ==
David Freedman was born in Botoșani, Romania, as the first child and only son of Sara and Israel Freedman. Israel, a political refugee, immigrated with his young family to the United States in 1900, where four years later, David's sister Sophie became the first Freedman born in the U.S.

Freedman graduated from the City College of New York in 1918, the first in his family to complete a formal education beyond high school. In September 1918, he married Beatrice (née Rebecca Goodman), a fellow New Yorker, who was born in the city on September 27, 1899 (her parents had fled from Kishinev, Russian Empire). Within five years they had three sons, Benedict (1919–2012), Noel (1922–2008, later adopted name David Noel), and Toby (1924–2011). A decade later their only daughter, who is now known as Laurie Hayden, arrived.

From 1924 on, Freedman was a self-employed writer. He created sketches for musicals and had shows on Broadway almost every year from 1926 through 1937. His novel Mendel Marantz (1925) featured a Jewish father who frequently made witty remarks. His first play, Mendel, Inc., debuted in 1929. When radio replaced vaudeville, Freedman—who already enjoyed a reputation as a popular, versatile writer—was ready for the new medium. He was prolific, creating as many as six entertainment programs a week for several years, and eventually worked in movies as well.

Freedman was also a biographer and wrote about industry insiders. His first biography, the Eddie Cantor memoir My Life Is in Your Hands (1928, "as told to" Freedman by Cantor), became a bestseller. Freedman and Cantor collaborated on a biography of showman Florenz Ziegfeld; Ziegfeld: the Great Glorifier (1934) was used for the film Ziegfeld Follies (1945). Similarly, Phantom Fame which he co-authored with the impresario Harry Reichenbach (1931) became the basis for the movie The Half-Naked Truth (1932).

In the mid-1930s Freedman contributed scripts for short comedies produced by Educational Pictures in New York. The best known is probably Blue Blazes (1936), starring Buster Keaton as an inept fireman.

Freedman suffered a massive heart attack on the evening of Monday, December 7, 1936. He died the following day at his apartment in Manhattan. He was survived by Beatrice, his partner of 18 years, and their four children, who ranged in age from just under 17 to just under 2 years. He was buried at Mount Carmel Cemetery in Queens.

== Legacy ==
According to his son, David Noel Freedman, it is unlikely that contemporary audiences would appreciate most of David Freedman's work (though his jokes about the stock market still ring true), because most of his jokes played on the peculiarities and sensitivities of his era. Freedman's stories, however, have a timeless quality. As the years passed, his family honored his memory with the posthumous publication of The Intellectual Lover (1940, repr. 2007), a collection of short stories that were originally published individually between 1922 and 1928.

Of the countless pieces Freedman wrote between 1920 and 1936, Mendel, Inc. (1929) is the only fully realized play. A product of the beginning of his brief career, it embodies the mature thoughts of a humorist/playwright. On June 2, 2004, this classic comedy about an immigrant Jewish family living in the uncertain times of 1929 of the Lower East Side was read to a packed house at the North Coast Repertory Theatre in Solana Beach, California. Mendel, Inc. was used as the basis for the 1932 Warner Brothers movie The Heart of New York, a vehicle for Jewish-dialect comedians Smith and Dale, with comedian George Sidney as Mendel Marantz.

Four books by Freedman were translated into Russian and published by Ogonyok in 1926; they enjoyed tremendous popularity for a short period, and Mendel's witty "definitions" were quoted everywhere, but within a year they were eclipsed by the comic writings of Ilf and Petrov and Mikhail Zoshchenko, and soon were forgotten, although Anatoly Rybakov has a character quote Mendel in Children of the Arbat (set in 1933). His novel Mendel Marantz was republished as an audiobook in Russian in 2011, narrated by noted actors Klara Novikova, Leonid Kanevsky and others.

A fictionalized version of David Freedman appears as Harry Goldhandler in the novel Inside, Outside by Herman Wouk.

== Writings ==
=== Books ===
- Mendel Marantz (1925 and 1986)
- My Life Is in Your Hands (1928 and 2000)
- Caught Short! a Saga of Wailing Wall Street (1929)
- Between the Acts (1930)
- Phantom Fame: The Anatomy of Ballyhoo (1931)
- Yoo-Hoo Prosperity! The Eddie Cantor Five-year Plan (1931)
- Your Next President! (1932)
- Ziegfeld: the Great Glorifier (1934)
- The Intellectual Lover and Other Stories (1940 and 1986)

=== Shows ===
- Betsy
- Crazy Quilt
- Forward March
- Life Begins at 8:40
- Mendel, Inc.
- The Show is On
- Sweet and Low
- White Horse Inn
- Ziegfeld Follies of 1934
- Ziegfeld Follies of 1936
- Lucky Fred

=== Movies ===
- Palmy Days (1931)
- The Half Naked Truth (1932)
- The Heart of New York (1932)
- Blue Blazes (1936)
- Ziegfeld Follies (1945)

== Sources ==
- Auerbach, Arnold, Funny Men Don't Laugh (Doubleday, NY, 1965); this book is a memoir, largely covering Auerbach's period of apprenticeship with Freedman, but the name "Lou Jacobs" is substituted in place of "David Freedman"
- Bercovici, Konrad, introduction to The Intellectual Lover and Other Stories by David Freedman.
- Morris Buckley, Patricia, "Long-lost Play Resurrected for Jewish Arts Festival", North County Times, May 26, 2004.
- Additional sources include the credits listed in the items in the Select Anthology and confirmation of the contents of this article by Herman Wouk (December 2004, Palm Springs, CA), David Noel Freedman (December 2004, La Jolla, CA, and other members of the Freedman family in 2005), and members of the Cantor family (2006).
