= Always Kickin' =

1932 film

Always Kickin' (1932)

Always Kickin' is a 19 minute sports-themed comedy film released in 1932. It was an E.W. Hammons production with Educational Pictures distributing. The film's actors included Jim Thorpe as himself in a supporting role as football coach. The leading actors were Eugene Pallette, Lucile Webster Gleason, Russell Gleason and Eddie Dunn. It was directed by James Gleason. The story was by Charles W. Paddock.

According to IMDb, The two reel short is part of a trilogy of sports themed movies written by Paddock and released by Educational Films Corporation. The others were Off His Base guest starring baseball player Mike Donlin with a cameo from Jim Thorpe, and A Hockey Hick.

== See also ==
- Educational film
