= Shirley Chambers =

American actress

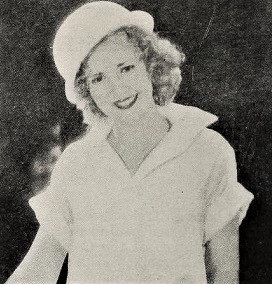
- Born: December 20, 1913; Seattle, Washington, U.S.
- Died: September 11, 2011 (aged 97); Los Angeles, California, U.S.
- Occupation: Actress
- Years active: 1932–1966
- Spouse: Horace D. Moulton (1935-?)

Shirley Chambers (December 20, 1913 – September 11, 2011) was an American film actress of the 1930s. She was notable for playing 'dumb blonde' roles in musical comedy films. She was discovered by press agent Harry Reichenbach.

== Biography ==
Chambers was born in Seattle, Washington, on December 20, 1913. She attended Huntington Park High School where she got into movies after winning a talent contest. She was in several films in the 1930s, but had largely retired by 1939. In 1935, Chambers married Horace D. Moulton, who was in the United States Navy.

Chambers died on September 11, 2011, in Los Angeles at the age of 97.

== Filmography ==
Year	Title	Role	Notes
1930	Whoopee!	Goldwyn Girl	Uncredited
1931	Her Majesty, Love		
1932	Union Depot	Dress Shop Assistant	Uncredited
1932	High Pressure		
1932	The Roadhouse Murder	Blonde in Bath	Uncredited
1932	The Kid from Spain	Goldwyn Girl	Uncredited
1932	The Half-Naked Truth	Gladys aka Ella Beebee	
1933	42nd Street	Chorus Girl	Uncredited
1933	Gold Diggers of 1933	Gold Digger	Uncredited
1933	Diplomaniacs	Ship's Passenger	Uncredited
1933	Melody Cruise	Vera	
1933	Morning Glory	Woman at Party	Uncredited
1933	Dancing Lady	Chorus Girl	Uncredited
1934	Viva Villa!	Blonde Manicurist at Banquet Next to Pancho	Uncredited
1934	Private Scandal	Mrs. Belle Orrington	Uncredited
1934	The Merry Widow	Maxim Girl	Uncredited
1934	By Your Leave	Merle	Uncredited
1935	Vagabond Lady	John's Blonde Secretary	Uncredited
1935	Calm Yourself	Joan Vincent	
1937	Fit for a King	Reception Guest	Uncredited
1937	The Last Gangster	Blonde Girl in Dive	Uncredited
1937	Nothing Sacred	Lady Godiva	Uncredited
1939	The Women	Girl in a Bath	Uncredited
1939	Gone With the Wind	Belle's Girl	Uncredited
1947	The Homestretch	Guest	Uncredited
