= Vic Braden =

American tennis player (1929–2014)

- Full name: Victor Kenneth Braden Jr.
- Country (sports): United States
- Born: August 2, 1929 Monroe, Michigan, US
- Died: October 6, 2014 (aged 85) Trabuco Canyon, California, US
- Height: 5 ft 6 in (1.68 m)
- Turned pro: 1952
- Retired: 1955
- Int. Tennis HoF: 2017 (member page)

Victor Kenneth Braden Jr. (August 2, 1929 – October 6, 2014) was an American tennis player, instructor, sport researcher and television broadcaster for the sport. He earned a PhD in psychology and was married twice. He had 2 children, 1 grandchild and 3 step-children.

== Biography ==
Introduced to tennis at age 12, he became good enough to earn three Michigan state high school championships, a scholarship to Kalamazoo College, invites to play in River Forest, Illinois, and in Milwaukee. He told Sports Illustrated in a 1976 interview that he once hitchhiked to Detroit to watch Don Budge play Bobby Riggs, because he wanted to learn how Budge hit his backhand.

Braden graduated from Kalamazoo College, where he was Captain of the Tennis Team, and won the MIAA Conference Singles Title. He married a model, Joan, upon graduation. He was awarded an honorary doctorate degree by his alma mater in 2008.

Vic Braden died of a heart attack on October 6, 2014, at the age of 85. He was married for many years to his second wife, Melody.

== Career ==
Braden became a tennis professional after graduating from Kalamazoo College in 1951. While serving as Assistant Basketball Coach at the University of Toledo. Harold Tenney hired him to become the Head Tennis Professional at the Toledo Tennis Club. Besides teaching, he joined the pro tour and played against Jimmy Evert (father of Chris Evert) and George Richey (father of Cliff and Nancy Richey). He moved to California in 1956 and obtained a master's degree from California State University, Los Angeles and an honorary PhD from Kalamazoo College. Braden joined Jack Kramer's pro tour in 1959. In 1961, he and Kramer started the Jack Kramer Tennis Club in Palos Verdes, CA where Braden helped direct construction and sell memberships to the club and then served as the Head Tennis Professional. He started Tracy Austin in tennis, and developed his "Tennis College" concept. In 1986, Kramer said, "One Vic Braden is worth a lot of Champions in helping promote the sport. The McEnroes, Borgs, Connors, they've been great. But I don't think any one of them has created the interest in the sport that Vic has." Braden was a patient and good friend of Dr. Toby Freedman, who was prominent in Space and Sports Medicine at North American Aviation and Kerlan-Jobe Orthopedic Clinic, and was an avid Tennis Player.

== Professional accomplishments ==
- Co-founder, Vic Braden Tennis College, Star Island Resort, Kissimmee, Florida
- Co-founder, Vic Braden Tennis College, St. George, Utah
- Founder-Director, Vic Braden Tennis College, Coto de Caza, California
- 1989-2002 Board Member: Vic Braden Sports Institute for Neurological Research, Washington, D.C.
- 1986-1994 Founder, Vic Braden Ski College, Aspen, Colorado
- 1980-1990 Co-founder, Co-director, Coto Sports Research Center, California
- 1967-1969 Manager, Pro Tennis Tour/George MacCall/Charlton Heston
- 1961-1972 Co-founder, Jack Kramer Club, Rolling Hills Estates, California
- 1957-1958 Instructor, University of California, Los Angeles (UCLA) Psychology Clinic
- 1952-1955 Head Tennis/Assistant Basketball Coach, University of Toledo, Ohio

== Awards ==
- Contributing Most to Tennis in America (USTA)
- Orange County Hall of Fame Lifetime Achievement Award (Sportswriter)
- Coach of the Year Award (USPTA).
- ATP Children's Tennis Award.
- Faculty Emeritus Award
- USTA Midwest Tennis Hall of Fame
- International Tennis Hall of Fame Tennis Educational Merit Award (1974)
- International Tennis Hall of Fame inductee in 2017

== Videos ==
- Vic Braden's 70 Minutes with Big Jake Kramer and Pancho Gonzalez Video
- Vic Braden's Biomechanics of Tennis Video
- Vic Braden's Strategy Video
- Vic Braden's The Backhand
- Vic Braden's The Forehand
- Vic Braden's The Serve
- Tennis My Way

=== Vocational highlights ===
Licensed psychologist (California), author, sports educator and researcher, cinematographer, videographer, sports, television commentator.

=== Books authored ===
He has authored five books with Bill Bruns whom he met in 1973.

- Braden, Vic; Bill Bruns (1977). Vic Braden's Tennis for the Future. ISBN 978-0-316-10511-8.
- Braden, Vic; Bill Bruns (1982). Teaching Children Tennis the Vic Braden Way. ISBN 978-0-316-10512-5.
- Braden, Vic (1986). Sportsathon!. Co-authored with L. Phillips.
- Braden, Vic; Bill Bruns (1990). Vic Braden's Quick Fixes: Expert Cures for Common Tennis Problems. Little Brown & Co. (P). ISBN 978-0-316-10515-6.
- Braden, Vic; Robert Wool (1994). Vic Braden's Mental Tennis: How to Psych Yourself to a Winning Game. Little Brown & Co. ISBN 978-0-316-10517-0.
- Braden, Vic; Bill Bruns (1996). Vic Braden's Laugh and Win at Doubles. Little Brown & Co. (T). pp. 179. ISBN 978-0-316-10519-4.
- Braden, Vic; Bill Bruns (1998). Tennis 2000: Strokes, Strategy, and Psychology for a Lifetime. Little Brown & Co. (P). pp. 284. ISBN 978-0-316-10503-3.
- Braden, Vic (2012). If I'm Only 22, How Come I'm 82?—Tennis Is More than Just a Sport.

=== Books: other ===
- Wrote foreword: High Tech Tennis (1992). By Jack L. Groppel.
- Co-editor, and credited as photographer: Championship Tennis by the Experts: How to Play Championship Tennis (1981).

=== Featured in print media ===
- Time magazine
- Vic Braden's name is mentioned in endnote 184 of David Foster Wallace's Infinite Jest

=== Vic's Vacant Lot ===
Braden hosted a short-lived television series, Vic's Vacant Lot, which ran from 1982 to early 1984 for 26 episodes on ESPN and rerun on Nickelodeon until May 1985. The premise was to send Braden out with a group of children to show them how to organize competitive sports on a vacant lot, as specified in the title. Due to the show not receiving much recognition, no recordings were available online, at least until January 3, 2022, when an Internet Archive user uploaded an episode of the show in two parts.
