= Cameo Comedies =

American brand of short comedy films

Cameo Comedies is a brand of short comedy films made in the United States. The films are one-reel shorts from Educational Pictures, usually produced by Jack White, and Colonial Motion Picture Corporation. The Cameo brand was used during the 1924–25 and 1931–32 seasons. Three of the productions utilized 3D stereoscopic effects in the titles. The earlier films were produced for $5,000 each.

For the other Educational series, see the Wikipedia entry on Educational Pictures.

== Partial filmography ==
- Out Bound (1924, with Sid Smith and Cliff Bowes)
- Drenched (1924, with Cliff Bowes)
- Scrambled Eggs (1925, with Phil Dunham)
- The Mad Rush (1925, with Cliff Bowes)
- That's My Meat (1931, with Al St. John)
- One Quiet Night (1931, with Walter Catlett)
- Idle Roomers (1931, with the Molino Brothers)
- Honeymoon Trio (1931, with Al St. John)
- Smart Work (1931, with Billy Dooley)
- Anybody's Goat (1932, with Monte Collins)
- Bridge Wives (1932, with Al St. John)

== See also ==
- Film series
- List of live action American short films
- Tuxedo Comedies
