= Tuxedo Comedies =

Tuxedo Comedies were a brand of short comedy films in the United States. Comedian Al St. John appeared in and directed many of them after his three years with Fox Film doing Sunshine Comedies (see Al St. John filmography for details). They were produced by Reel Comedies. Educational Pictures distributed.

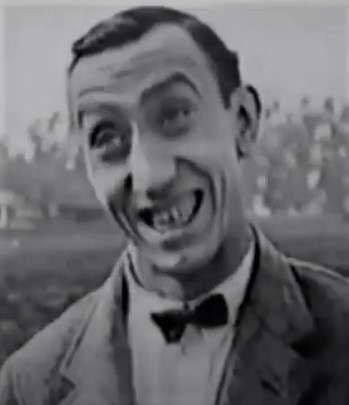
Cropped image of George Davis in His First Car

Tuxedo Comedies are 2-reeler silent films produced from 1923 until 1929 and comedy films with sound produced from 1929 until 1931 and 1935 to 1936.

The films were budgeted at around $10,000 each. Educational Pictures' Mermaid Comedies were higher budget and it also had a budget line of cheaper 1-reel comedies in the Cameo Comedies line.

Wallace Lupino was one of the feature performers. Tuxedo was a Jack White Productions brand.

== Partial filmography ==
- Easter Bonnets (1923)
- Front (1923)
- No Loading (1923)
- One Night it Rained (1924)
- The New Sheriff (1924)
- Stupid But Brave (1924)
- Lovemania (1924), directed by Al St. John and featuring Doris Deane. Extant
- The Tourist (1925)
- The Movies (1925)
- Cleaning Up (1925)
- The Iron Mule (1925)
- My Stars (1926)
- Home Cured (1926)
- His First Car
