= Blue blazer =

Blue blazer may refer to:

- Blue blazer, a flaming drink
- A blue blazer, a type of jacket
- The Blue Blazer, the working name of professional wrestler Owen Hart

== See also ==
- Blue Blaze (disambiguation)
