= Educational Pictures =

American film company

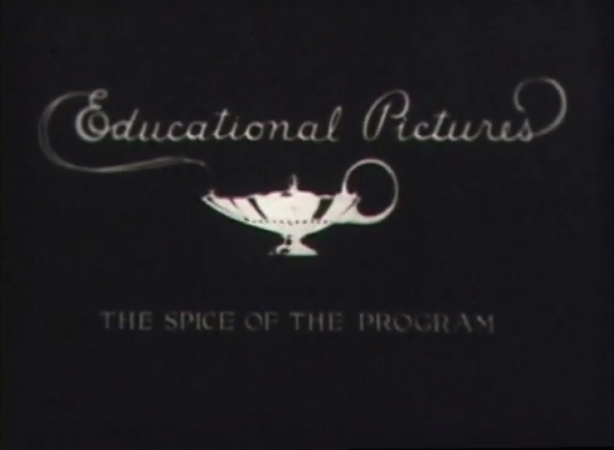
- Education Pictures Logo From 1924 Film “Reno or Bust”
- Company type: Private
- Industry: Film
- Founded: 1916
- Founder: Earle (E. W.) Hammons
- Defunct: 1940
- Fate: Film library acquired
- Successor: Astor Pictures

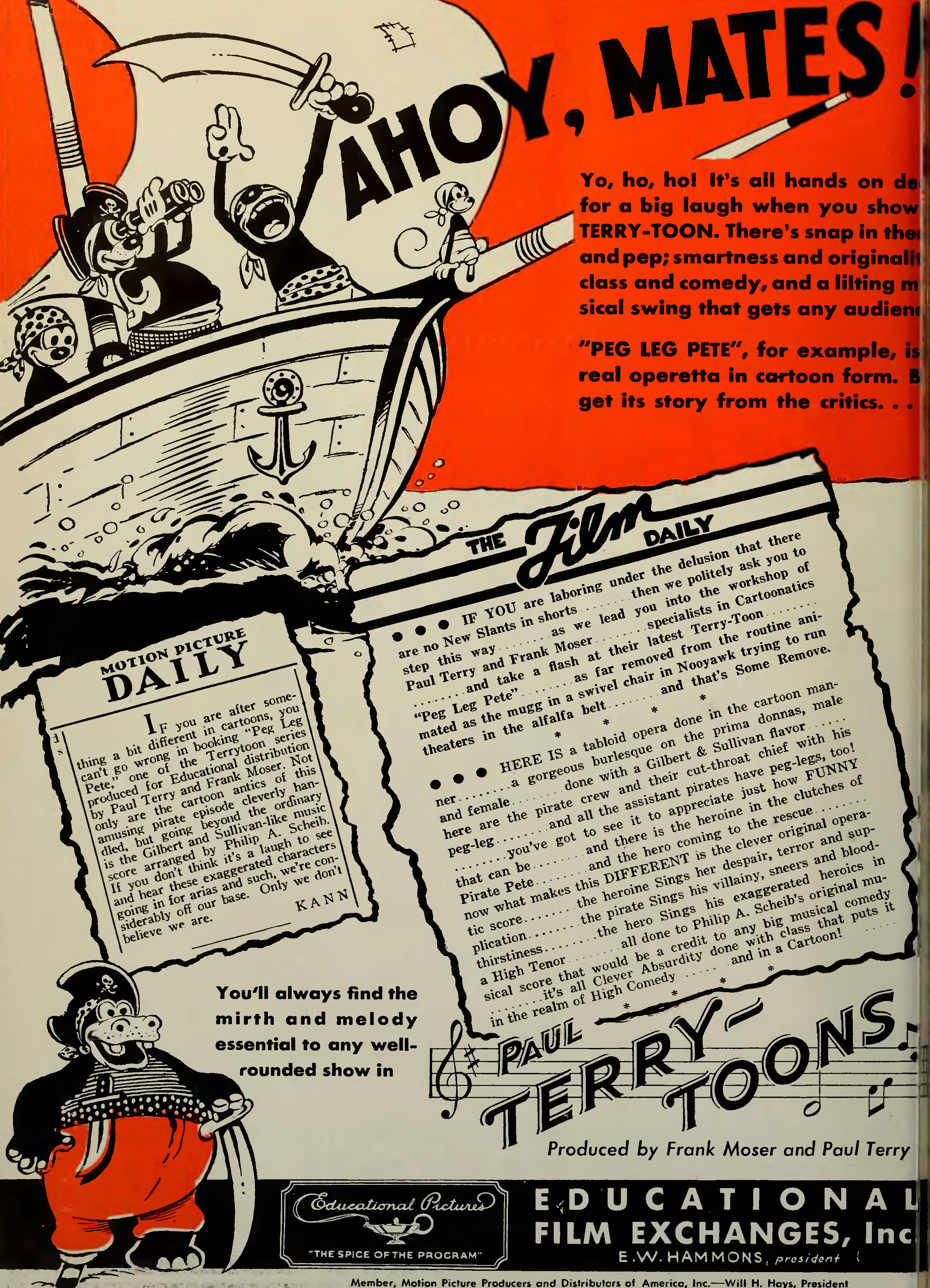
Paul Terrytoons ad in The Film Daily, 1932 by Educational Film Exchanges, Inc.

Educational Pictures, also known as Educational Film Exchanges, Inc. or Educational Films Corporation of America, was an American film production and film distribution company founded in 1916 by Earle (E. W.) Hammons (1882–1962). Educational primarily distributed short subjects; it is best known for its series of comedies starring Buster Keaton and the earliest screen appearances of Shirley Temple (1932–34). The company ceased production in 1938, and finally closed in 1940 when its film library was sold at an auction.

== Success with silents ==
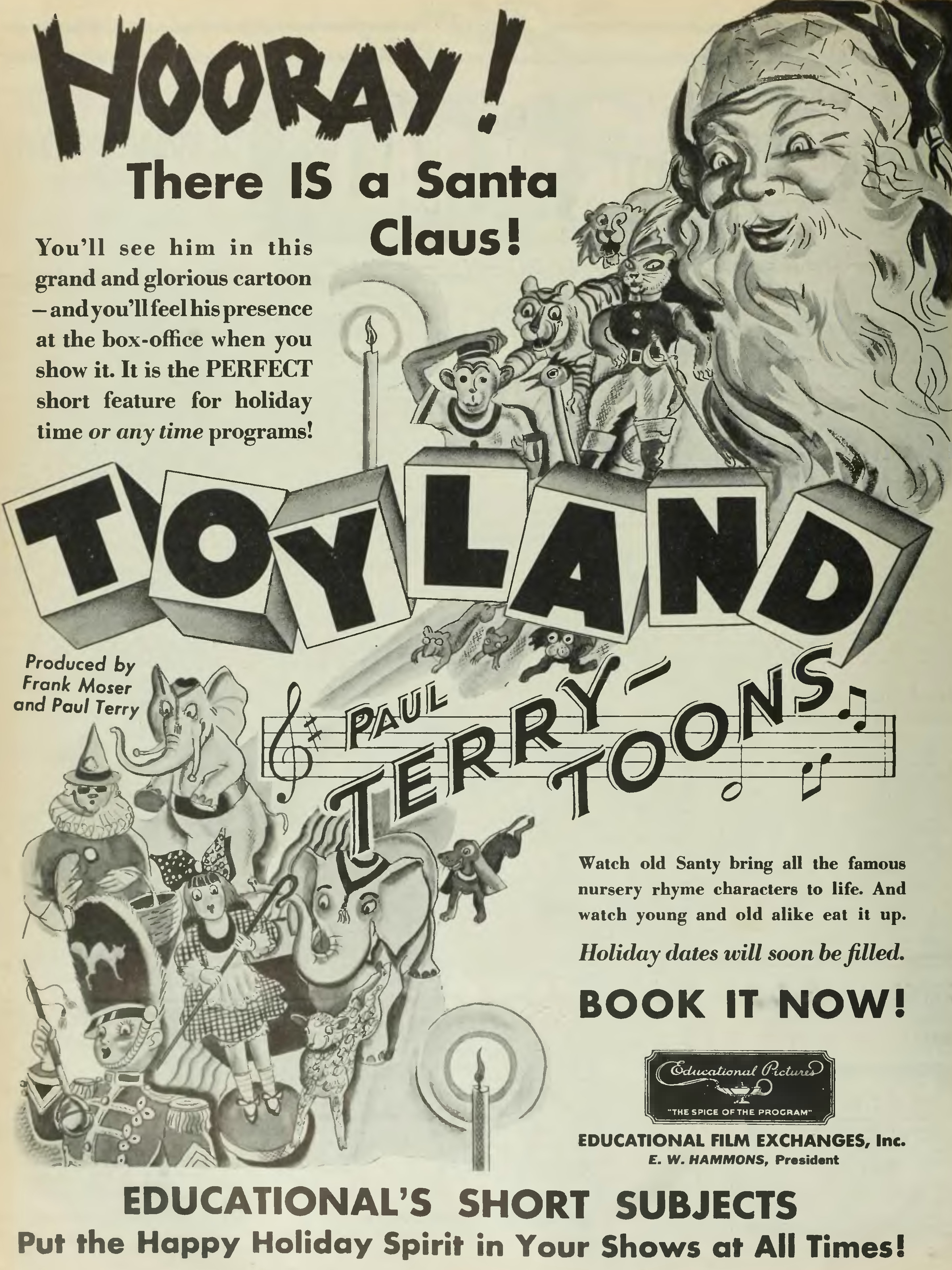
"Toyland" produced by Frank Moser and Paul Terry-Toons, 1932

Hammons established the company to make instructional films for schools, but making comedies for theatrical release proved more lucrative. Educational did issue many educational, travelogue, and novelty shorts, but its main enterprise became comedy. Educational's heyday was the 1920s, when the popular silent comedies of Al St. John, Lupino Lane, Lige Conley, Lloyd Hamilton, and Monty Collins complemented many a moviehouse bill as "the spice of the program." During the 1920s, most of the comedies were produced by Jack White. In 1924 Educational quietly hired two leading figures in the comedy community who had been disgraced in a scandal: comedian Roscoe "Fatty" Arbuckle (who became a director at Educational under the pseudonym William Goodrich) and director Fred Fishback (under the pseudonym Fred Hibbard).

Educational also released silent cartoons, including the Felix the Cat series. In 1930, cartoonist Paul Terry signed with Educational to distribute his Terrytoons animated cartoons in America and British countries.

== Sound films ==
Educational made a smooth transition to sound movies by handling the early talking comedies of pioneer producer Mack Sennett. Sennett also introduced singing star Bing Crosby to movie audiences. Most of Educational's silent stars made only a few talkies for the studio: Lupino Lane left the company in December 1929, followed by Lloyd Hamilton and Al St. John in 1931. Most of the earliest Educational talkies feature silent-comedy veterans with stage experience: Vernon Dent, Harry Gribbon, Raymond McKee, Edward Everett Horton, Daphne Pollard, and Ford Sterling. Educational's most prolific comedian in the 1930s was the Sennett star Andy Clyde, who made 54 comedies.

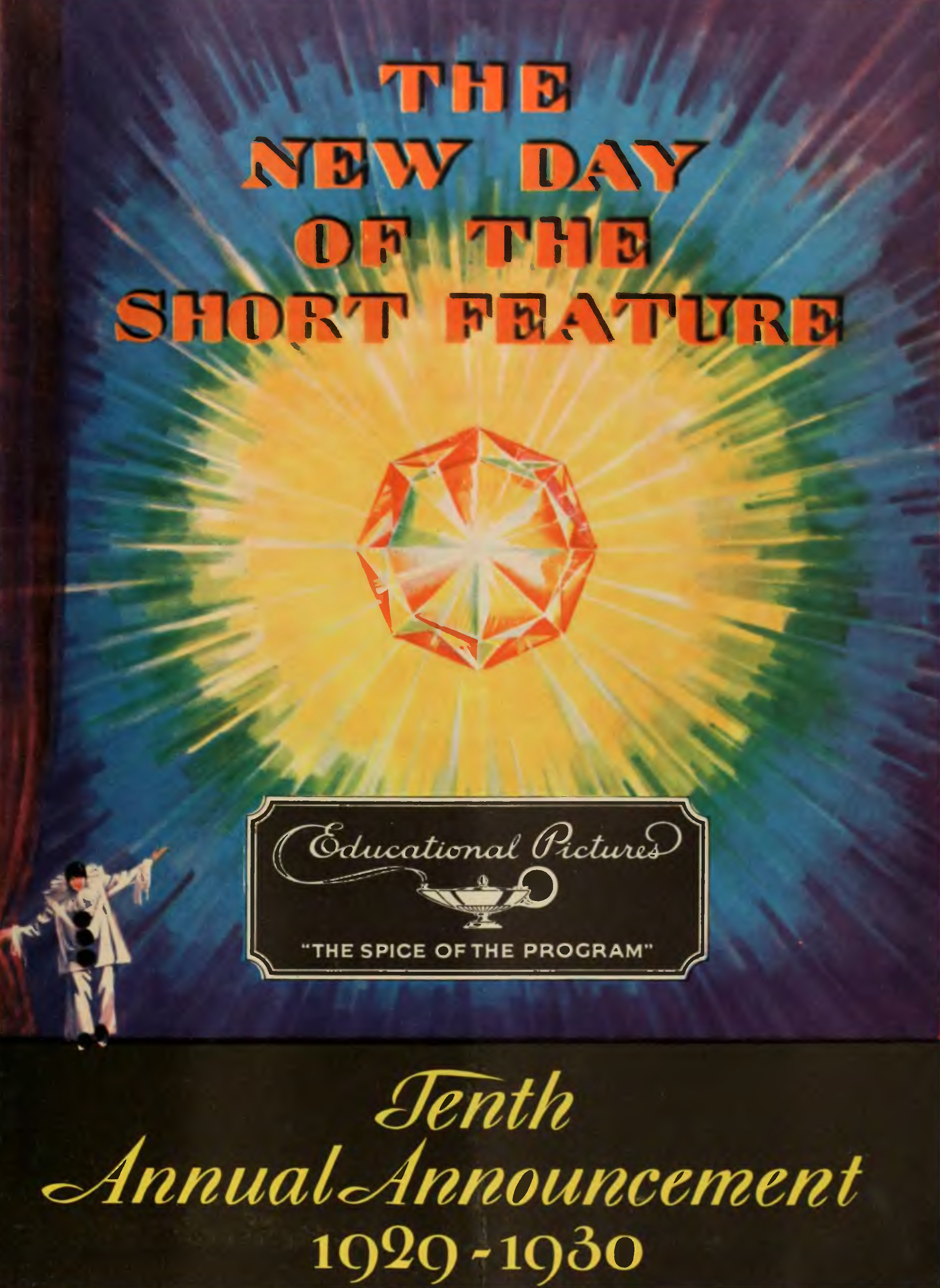
Educational Pictures ad in The Film Daily, 1929

Sennett's releasing arrangement with Educational drew to a close in 1932. Jack White, who had been Educational's leading producer, explained, "We put Mack Sennett out of business. Theaters had [our] comedies booked solid. Sennett was very temperamental and wanted the exhibitor to do certain things, but they wouldn't stand for it. Sennett wouldn't stand for Hammons not telling him how much [money] he was cutting out of the grosses for himself. Sennett told him to go to hell."

Earle Hammons replaced the Sennett films with star-name comedians. Educational took over the Andy Clyde series; Clyde and Harry Langdon led Educational's release schedule for a few years.

== Buster Keaton ==
Buster Keaton, despite a successful feature-film career, had experienced personal problems and was fired from Metro-Goldwyn-Mayer in 1933. He accepted offers to make two films in Europe, in 1934. Meanwhile, Educational's headline comedians Andy Clyde and Harry Langdon both left the company to join the new two-reel-comedy department at Columbia Pictures, and Hammons needed a comedy star to replace them. He hired Buster Keaton for two-reel comedies but, given Keaton's track record of unreliability at MGM, he wouldn't sign Keaton to a long-term contract. Instead, Hammons signed Keaton for only two shorts, with an option for four more. When the shorts proved popular, Hammons renewed each short-term option. Keaton ultimately made 16 shorts for Educational.

Most of the Keaton Educationals are simple visual comedies, with many of the gags supplied by Keaton himself, often recycling ideas from his family vaudeville act and his earlier films. The high point in this series is Grand Slam Opera (1936), featuring Buster in his own screenplay as an amateur-hour contestant.

== Production and releasing arrangements ==
Educational's short comedies sometimes show their low budgets, with noticeably limited sets and facilities. This is because Educational didn't have its own physical plant. Earle Hammons, rather than purchasing, equipping, and maintaining a studio, found it cheaper and easier to send his crews to suburban locations where scenes could be photographed outdoors, or to rental studios that offered both space and equipment to independent producers. Outdoor shooting continued until the very last Educational comedy, released in 1939.

For a time Educational filmed its comedies on both coasts. The Hollywood productions were filmed at General Service Studios, with comedy stars Andy Clyde, Harry Langdon, Buster Keaton, Moran and Mack, Edgar Kennedy, Billy Gilbert and Vince Barnett, and Ernest Truex. Educational's east coast productions were filmed at Eastern Service Studios (the New York branch of General Service, now known as the Astoria Studios), and starred New York-based talent from Broadway, vaudeville, and radio: Charlotte Greenwood, Joe Cook, Willie Howard, Lillian Roth, Will Mahoney, Tim and Irene Ryan, actor-singers Sylvia Froos and Warren Hull, Tom Howard and George Shelton, the Sisters of the Skillet (Ralph Dumke and Ed East), and Stoopnagle and Budd.

Educational had been releasing its own product until 1933, when Fox Film took over distribution. Fox's successor Twentieth Century-Fox continued the arrangement. This resulted in Educational becoming Fox's "farm team", introducing new talent that Fox would take over for feature films. Shirley Temple, The Ritz Brothers, Joan Davis, and Leah Ray all won Fox contracts after starring for Educational. Many stars made debuts in Educational shorts: Bob Hope, Milton Berle, Warren Hull, June Allyson, Imogene Coca, Danny Kaye, Barry Sullivan, and Robert Shayne in New York; and Roy Rogers and the Sons of the Pioneers in Hollywood.

Educational was associated with Jack H. Skirball, who produced films under his Skibo label, which Educational acquired.

In 1935 Mack Sennett, who had been idle for two years, tried to continue his career by signing with Educational as a director. It is quite possible that Sennett again clashed with studio head Earle Hammons, because Sennett left Educational's employ after only two shorts: The Timid Young Man with Buster Keaton and Way Up Thar with Joan Davis (both 1935).

== Series ==
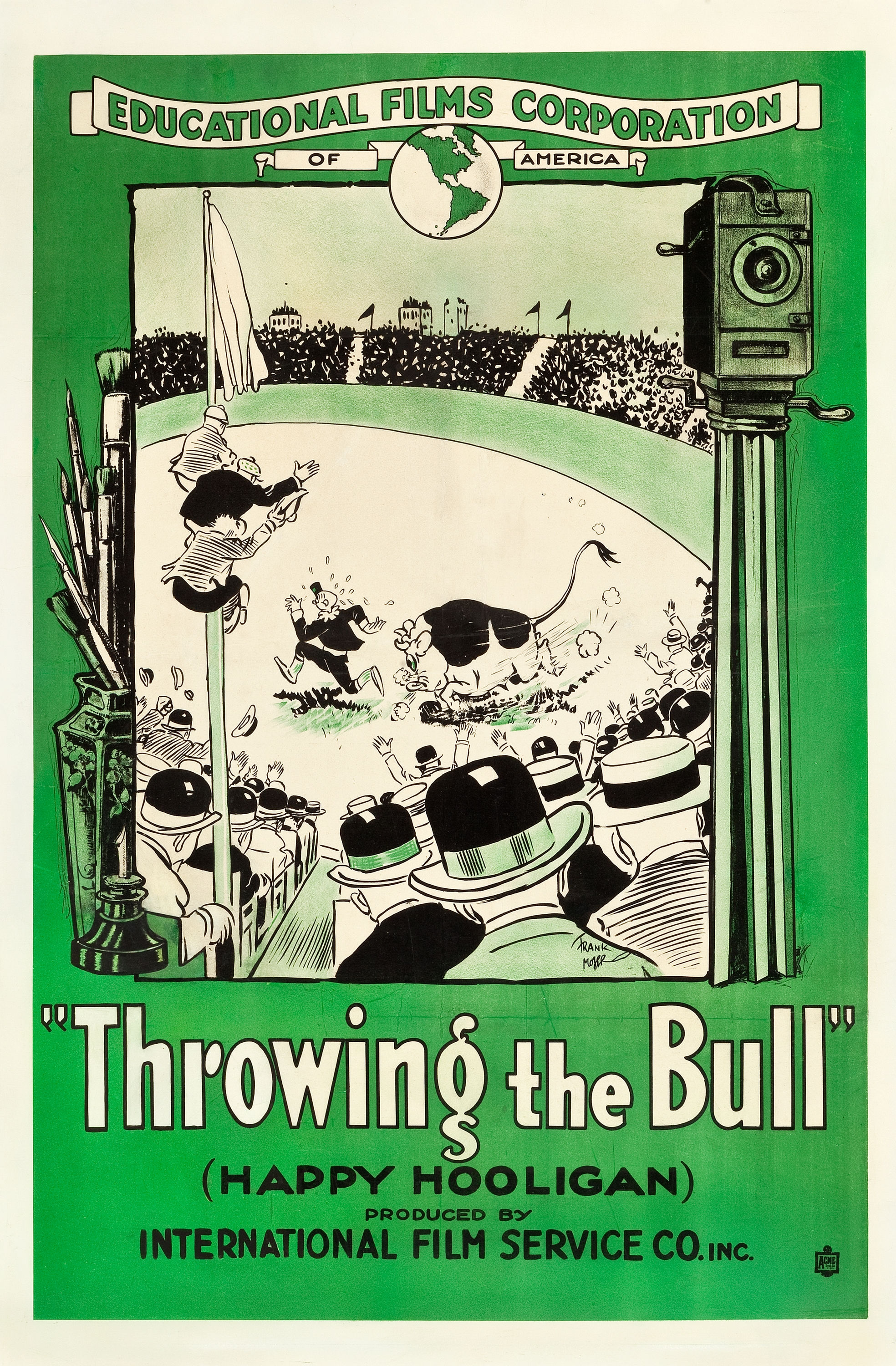
Educational also produced animated film shorts. This 1918 short features Happy Hooligan.

Like other short-subject producers, Educational Pictures marketed its assorted offerings in individual series. Among these were [Robert] Bruce Scenics (travelogues, 1918–1920), Lyman Howe's Hodge Podge (miscellaneous human-interest shorts; the series outlived its creator); Treasure Chest (miscellaneous subjects); Coronet Comedies (one-reel subjects, 1929–1931 and 1934–1936); Lloyd Hamilton Talking Comedies (two-reel, 1929–1931); Cameo Comedies (one-reel, 1931–1932); Tuxedo Comedies (two-reel, 1924–1931 and 1935–1936); Ideal Comedies (1930–1932); Vanity Comedies (1931–1932); Baby Burlesks (Shirley Temple; one-reel, 1932–1933), Frolics of Youth (Frank Coghlan, Jr. and Shirley Temple, two-reel, 1932–1934), Star Personality Comedies (Buster Keaton, Joe Cook, Willie Howard; two-reel, 1934–1938); Young Romance Comedies (two-reel: Sylvia Froos and Warren Hull, 1934–1935; Marlyn Stuart and Ackland Powell, 1936); Song and Comedy Hits (one-reel musical comedies, 1935–1938); and Col. Stoopnagle's Cavalcade of Stuff (Educational's last and briefest series – only two one-reel comedies issued just before the studio closed its doors, 1939).

Perhaps the most controversial series was the Marriage Wows (1934–35), comprising only three two-reel shorts starring husband-and-wife comics: Dumb Luck with the Easy Aces, and Domestic Bliss-ters and How Am I Doing with Chick York and Rose King. How Am I Doing featured a faithful transcription of York & King's successful vaudeville sketch "The Sleigh Ride", but the team's racy dialogue ran into trouble in small towns. A Maine exhibitor reported, "I didn't dare use it [but] I showed it to some of my friends and the staff and they laughed until they cried. It's a corker, but don't show it in Sunday school." The series was dropped without fanfare.

== Production in New York ==
By 1936, for economic reasons, Educational had been concentrating its production in New York. Star comedian Joe Cook was leaving the studio after completing five comedies, and Earle Hammons needed a "name" comedian to fill the vacancy. Hammons tried to persuade Lupino Lane, then living and working in England, to return to the screen in two-reel comedies. Lane gave the offer enough consideration for Hammons to announce it publicly, listing the new season's contract actors "and possibly Lupino Lane", but Lane finally declined and remained in England.

Hammons then invited Buster Keaton to make comedies in New York, perhaps in a bid for Keaton to relocate. Keaton agreed to three New York productions (Blue Blazes, Mixed Magic, and The Chemist) but returned to California where he finished out his Educational series. Buster Keaton was Educational's most expensive talent and Hammons, forced to economize, could no longer afford the comedian's services. Hammons discontinued west coast operations after the last Keaton short was completed in 1937.

Educational confined filming to New York during its last year of production (1937-1938). The technical staff was a small, close-knit crew: producer-director Al Christie; writer-director William Watson; assistant directors Robert Hall (promoted to director in 1936), Chris Beute, and Johnny Graham; writers Parke Levy, Arthur Jarrett (who also acted in some shorts), Marcy Klauber, and Billy K. Wells; script clerk Doris Barber, and the New York studio's staff cameraman George Webber. Webber was such a fixture at Astoria that the trade press noted it in print: "with George Webber, naturally, at the camera."

Earle Hammons replaced Buster Keaton with Broadway dialect comic Willie Howard, who appeared as the Hebrew Frenchman "Pierre Ginsbairge." Hammons also signed Bert Lahr for two-reelers, and continued the studio's musical-comedy series with dancers Buster West and Tom Patricola. Illustrator Jefferson Machamer starred in a series inspired by his "Gags 'n' Gals" newspaper cartoons. Character comedian George Shelton was now working solo; he and partner Tom Howard reunited on radio's It Pays to Be Ignorant.

Most of the later Educational series focused on youth; besides being less expensive talent, the young actors lent a high level of energy to their performances. Educational's freshman class included the comedy/dance team of Herman Timberg, Jr. and Pat Rooney, Jr., singers Niela Goodelle and Lee Sullivan, mild-mannered comic Charles Kemper (reminiscent of Educational's bygone star Lloyd Hamilton), wisecracking comedian Harriet Hutchins, ingenues June Allyson and Sally Starr, juvenile singing group The Cabin Kids, rubber-faced clown Imogene Coca, and up-and-coming dialect comedian Danny Kaye, who began as a supporting player and soon received starring roles.

== Ambition and failure ==
Twentieth Century-Fox had been distributing Educational product to theaters. It has long been thought that Fox dropped its line of short comedies in 1938 and withdrew its financial support from Educational, but in fact it was the other way around: it was Earle Hammons who discontinued Educational's short-subject production, allowed his agreement with Fox to expire, and declined to renew it. Other studios approached Hammons with similar distribution deals for short subjects, but Hal Roach, Paramount, and Universal had already discontinued two-reel-comedy production with the advance of double features, and Hammons was anxious to follow Roach's example and enter the feature-film market. Hammons joined forces with the financially troubled Grand National Pictures, in the hope of producing both full-length films and short subjects for that studio. The merger called for Hammons to become the president of the company, with Grand National president Edward L. Alperson becoming "vice-chairman of the new board and general manager of distribution." Hammons then bought the assets of Grand National outright, for $550,000.

Earle Hammons had stockpiled enough shorts to keep Educational going through June 1938; these films were distributed by Fox. The last two Educational shorts appeared in January 1939, released through Grand National; these were produced not by Hammons but by independent distributor Robert M. Savini. Col. Stoopnagle's Cavalcade of Stuff ("No. 1" and "No. 2") were one-reel newsreel satires written by and starring radio and screen comic F. Chase Taylor.

Hammons spent most of 1938 and 1939 in negotiations to secure financing and reimburse creditors. He remained optimistic, announcing a new slate of 26 one-reel films and 18 two-reel comedies for 1939-40 under the Educational banner, but the drain on his finances forced both Grand National and Educational into bankruptcy.

== Aftermath ==
The film library was sold at auction in 1940. Most of the Educational sound shorts were obtained by Bob Savini of Astor Pictures, who shrewdly timed his re-releases to cash in on certain performers' popularity. Savini compiled four feature-length comedies showcasing, in turn, Shirley Temple (Our Girl Shirley, 1942), Danny Kaye (The Birth of a Star, 1945), Bing Crosby (The Road to Hollywood, 1947), and Bob Hope and Milton Berle (It Pays to Be Funny, 1948).

Earle Hammons retained the title to Educational's corporate name, Educational Films Corporation of America. Ten years after the demise of Educational Pictures, Hammons tried to gain a foothold in the new field of commercial television, using the Educational brand name and "The Spice of the Program" slogan: "This corporation employs men who have the experience, integrity, and the know-how of producing films and live shows for the television industry." In 1952 Hammons and Astor's Bob Savini partnered to form Lion Television Corporation. Hammons remained president of Lion until his death in 1962.

== Legacy ==
Much of Educational's silent film library was lost in a 1937 fire at the 20th Century-Fox film storage facility, but the sound comedies survive today. On October 21, 2017 CineMuseum LLC, a consortium of film archivists, secured exclusive rights to the Educational sound comedies, with plans to restore and re-release them to media outlets.

== Logo ==
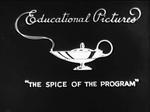
Educational Pictures Logo

Educational Pictures's logo consists of a genie's lamp, above which the words "Educational Pictures" appear formed by the smoke from the lamp. Below the lamp, enclosed in quotation marks are the words The Spice of the Program.

The use of the logo in film credits was unique to Educational. The shorts would begin with the opening title card, usually having "E. W. Hammons presents" at the top, followed by the title of the short. The Educational logo would then appear full screen. Normally, studios would have their logos appear before the opening titles, while Educational placed its logo after the opening credits. At the end, there would be a standard end title card with the mini-logo for Educational Pictures appearing somewhere in the end title.

== Selected filmography ==
Silent film Schoolday Love (1922) by director William S. Campbell for Educational Pictures. Running time: 21:57. A short comic children's film about a boy and a girl who experience all manner of adventures with a dog, a horse, a monkey, and other animals.

- Air Pockets (1924, with Lige Conley)
- The Iron Mule (1925, with Al St. John, directed by Roscoe Arbuckle)
- The Movies (1925, with Lloyd Hamilton, directed by Roscoe Arbuckle)
- Drama Deluxe (1927, with Lupino Lane, directed by Roscoe Arbuckle)
- Honeymooniacs (1929, with Monty Collins, directed by Jules White)
- The Right Bed (1929, with Edward Everett Horton)
- Honeymoon Trio (1931, with Al St. John, Walter Catlett, and Dorothy Granger, directed by Roscoe Arbuckle)
- Windy Riley Goes Hollywood (1931, with Jack Shutta and Louise Brooks, directed by Roscoe Arbuckle)
- The Hitch Hiker (1932, with Harry Langdon and Vernon Dent)
- I Surrender Dear (1932, with Bing Crosby)
- Krakatoa (1933, narrated by Graham McNamee, produced by Joe Rock)
- Million Dollar Melody (1933, with Lillian Roth)
- Two Black Crows in Africa (1933, with Moran and Mack)
- Dora's Dunking Doughnuts (1934, with Andy Clyde and Shirley Temple)
- Going Spanish (1934, with Bob Hope)
- Hotel Anchovy (1934, with The Ritz Brothers, directed by Al Christie)
- Three Cheers for Love (1934, with Sylvia Froos and Warren Hull)
- Dumb Luck (1935, with the Easy Aces)
- Grooms in Gloom (1935, with Tom Howard and George Shelton)
- Hail, Brother (1935, with Billy Gilbert)
- Mr. Widget (1935, with Joe Cook)
- Way Up Thar (1935, with Joan Davis, directed by Mack Sennett)
- Blue Blazes (1936, with Buster Keaton)
- Gags and Gals (1936, with Jefferson Machamer)
- Grand Slam Opera (1936, with Buster Keaton)
- The Bashful Ballerina (1937, with Imogene Coca)
- Dates and Nuts (1937, with Herman Timberg, Jr. and Pat Rooney, Jr., and June Allyson)
- Love Nest on Wheels (1937 with Buster Keaton; his final Educational comedy)
- Montague the Magnificent (1937, with Bert Lahr)
- Playboy Number One (1937, with Willie Howard)
- All's Fair (1938, with The Cabin Kids)
- Money on Your Life (1938, with Charles Kemper and Danny Kaye)
- Col. Stoopnagle's Cavalcade of Stuff #2 with F. Chase Taylor (1939, the final Educational comedy)
