= Grand Slam Opera =

1936 film

- Directed by: Buster Keaton; Charles Lamont
- Written by: Buster Keaton; Charles Lamont
- Produced by: E. H. Allen; E. W. Hammons
- Starring: Buster Keaton
- Cinematography: Gus Peterson
- Edited by: Karl Zint
- Production company: Educational Pictures
- Distributed by: Twentieth Century-Fox
- Release date: February 21, 1936
- Running time: 20 minutes
- Country: United States
- Language: English

Grand Slam Opera is a 1936 American short comedy film starring Buster Keaton and produced by Educational Pictures.

== Plot ==
Elmer Butts (Keaton) is seen off by his friends as he boards a train for New York City. He intends to appear on the radio show Colonel Crow's Amateur Night, but the show ends just before it's his turn to audition. He meets a beautiful young girl (who it transpires lives downstairs from him) and asks her out but is turned down. That night he practices several noisy dance routines in his bedroom, which angers the girl.

The next day Elmer attempts to audition for the colonel but a band is already on the air, playing "an international medley". Elmer, waiting his turn in the next room, gets caught up in the music and dances to the various ethnic melodies.

Elmer finally reaches the radio microphone. He is a juggler and intends to describe his juggling techniques to the audience listening at home. The incredulous colonel allows him to continue. During Elmer's performance he gets into several scuffles with the bandleader, who is trying to conduct "The Anvil Chorus". The studio audience watching the show finds the performance hilarious but Elmer is thrown out. Four weeks pass and Elmer is seen hitch-hiking at the side of a road. Overhearing a nearby car radio. he learns that his performance was voted the best of the night by the audience and his prize money has gone unclaimed. Elmer dashes back to the studio (via train, car, and on foot) and his new prosperity and popularity convince the girl to finally go on a date with him.

== Cast ==
- Buster Keaton as Elmer Butts
- Diana Lewis as The Girl Downstairs
- Harold Goodwin as Bandleader
- John Ince as Colonel Crow
- Bud Jamison as Arizona Sheriff
- Eddie Fetherston as Chauffeur

== Production and reception ==
Grand Slam Opera is a satire of the Major Bowes amateur hour, heard weekly on network radio. Buster Keaton co-wrote the screenplay with director Charles Lamont. The opening sequence, with Elmer taking his leave of Gopher City, Arizona by train, has Elmer and chorus singing a parody of George M. Cohan's hit song "So Long, Mary." Low-budget Educational didn't want to pay the $300 licensing fee to use the song, so Buster Keaton paid the fee personally. "Colonel Crow" parodies "Major Bowes," and the "dancing directly over the downstairs neighbor's room" satirizes the same episode in the Fred Astaire-Ginger Rogers musical Top Hat. The "Anvil Chorus" scene harks back to an old vaudeville routine, in which Keaton and his father exchanged slapstick blows in time to the music.

Grand Slam Opera was an exceptional success, with Buster Keaton receiving some of his all-time best notices. "Easily the best comedy Buster Keaton has ever delivered... Book it without seeing it. It can't miss," reported Film Daily. Motion Picture Daily agreed: "Buster Keaton contributing some of his best comedy, this one has entertainment in every frame." Variety enthused, "It's pretty near good enough to be sold as a baby feature." Educational capitalized on the favorable publicity and placed full-page ads in trade periodicals.

== See also ==
- Buster Keaton filmography
