= Toby Freedman =

American physician

Toby Freedman MD (July 2, 1924 – April 15, 2011) was an American physician. He worked with the American Manned Space Flight Program for North American Aviation as their corporate medical director, later served as a team physician for the Los Angeles Rams and Los Angeles Lakers, and was physician for Korean Airlines, before returning and retiring from North American Rockwell in 1988.

== Early life ==
Freedman was born in New York City on July 2, 1924. His father, David Freedman, was a comedy writer for Eddie Cantor. Cantor moved to Beverly Hills. In 1936, after David died, Beatrice Freedman, Toby's mother, moved Toby and his three siblings, Ben, Noel, and Laurie, to Beverly Hills.

Freedman graduated from Beverly Hills High School at age 16 in 1940, and was an All-Conference football guard. He met football player Tom Fears in high school, and they became lifelong friends.

Freedman received a football scholarship to the University of California, Berkeley. After three years, he transferred to Stanford University, receiving a B.A. in biology in 1945, and an M.D. degree from Stanford Medical School in 1948 along with longtime close friend Robert Kerlan. He completed his residency in 1951 in Internal Medicine at the USC Medical Center with Bob Kerlan, under the supervision of Dr. Max Gaspar. Freedman then entered the U.S. Air Force for five years.

== Space medicine ==
In 1956, Freedman joined North American Aviation, later North American Rockwell, as corporate medical director, reporting to Chairman Dutch Kindelberger and President Lee Atwood. In 1961, when North American Aviation was awarded contracts for the Apollo spacecraft and S-II second stage of the Saturn V rocket, Freedman was given the added responsibility of Director of Life Sciences in Downey, California. As Head of Aviation/Space Medicine and Medical Research at North American Aviation, Freedman worked closely with Division President Harrison Storms and his staff in producing the Apollo spacecraft.

He was a close friend of test pilot Scott Crossfield, and once saved his life after a flight test. He was frequently quoted in the press on medical aspects of space travel. He was a close friend of Corporate Vice President of Marketing, Tom Dixon. They were avid tennis players.

Freedman was known for promoting the idea that people could be modified to make them better adapted to space travel.

== Sports medicine ==
In 1970, Freedman left North American Rockwell to go into private practice to work for the Kerlan-Jobe Sports Medicine Group as a team physician for the Los Angeles Lakers and Los Angeles Rams.

Freedman enjoyed a lifelong friendship with Carroll Rosenbloom, owner of the Rams, his wife, Georgia Frontiere, and their son Chip Rosenbloom. He became their personal family physician.

He remained a medical consultant to the Rams and served as a member of the Rams Board of Directors until 2008. He had a close relationship with Rams players Merlin Olsen, James Harris, Jack Youngblood, Fred Dryer, Lawrence McCutcheon, and Dennis Harrah; trainers George Menefee and Jim Anderson; and receivers' coach, Lionel Taylor.

His Lakers friends included Elgin Baylor, Jerry West, Jeanie Buss, and Magic Johnson.

Freedman was an avid tennis player, and played tournaments and matches with Dale Jensen, Emil Porro, Ray Sena, Jim Tenney, Vern Gragson, Mike Carrico, and Sonny Sanders at North American Aviation locations, the Riviera Country Club, and the Palm Springs Racquet Club. He often played at Carroll Rosenbloom's tennis court and in many local tennis charity events such as Tennis and Crumpets, John Tracey Clinic, and The Adoption Guild. He organized employee tournaments at the various North American divisions.

Hall of Fame tennis players Tony Trabert and Vic Braden were his patients and close friends.

At the Olympics in 1984 in Los Angeles, Freedman was the team doctor for the tennis venue at UCLA won by Stefan Edberg and Steffi Graf.

== Later life ==
Freedman was the featured speaker at the memorial service for his longtime close friend, Dr Robert Kerlan in September 1996.

In 1985, Freedman returned to North American Rockwell, where he remained until his retirement three years later in 1988. He then moved to Bainbridge Island, Washington. He died in Poulsbo, Washington on April 15, 2011, at age 86. He was survived by his wife, Carol, daughter, Andrea St. Clair, and sister, Laurie.
