= Melody Cruise (film) =

1933 film by Mark Sandrich

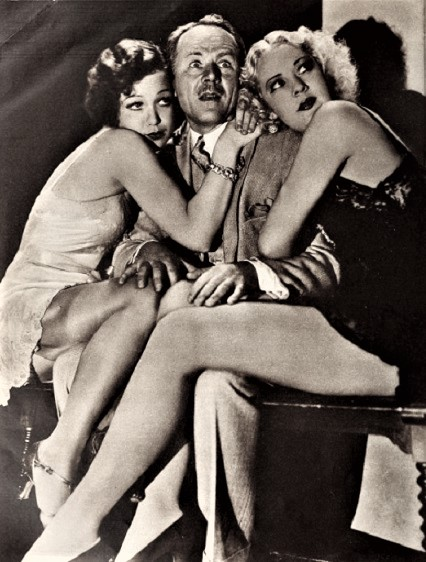
- June Brewster, Charles Ruggles, and Shirley Chambers in Melody Cruise
- Directed by: Mark Sandrich
- Screenplay by: Ben Holmes; Mark Sandric
- Produced by: Merian C. Cooper
- Starring: Charles Ruggles; Phil Harris; Helen Mack
- Cinematography: Bert Glennon
- Edited by: Jack Kitchin
- Music by: Max Steiner
- Distributed by: RKO Radio Pictures
- Release date: June 16, 1933
- Running time: 76 mins.
- Country: United States
- Language: English
- Budget: $163,000
- Box office: $485,000

Melody Cruise is a 1933 American pre-Code musical romantic comedy film directed by Mark Sandrich, his first feature film with sound. The film received praise for Sandrich's creative direction and solidly established him as a commercial director.

== Plot ==
On a cruise liner sailing to California, Pete Wells holds a party aboard. While drunk, Pete signs a letter written by his best friend, Alan Chandler, detailing his past adulterous affairs. After the party, Alan mails a letter to Pete's wife Grace, with instructions to be opened after Alan is married. Pete steps out to prevent the letter from being mailed but is too late.

The next morning, Pete finds two women, Zoe and Vera, inside his state room, who were supposed to leave prior to the liner's departure. To keep his affairs quiet, Pete agrees to pay each women five hundred dollars until they reach Havana. Pete approaches Hickey, a steward, and asks him to steal their clothes so both women remain hidden inside. Meanwhile, Alan purchases a poetry book from the bookstore, and sneaks into a cabin occupied by schoolteacher Laurie Marlowe. He reads her a poem, but Laurie demands he leave. When Alan begins to leave, Laurie's traveling companion Miss Potts invites him to return.

Later that night, Pete bribes Hickey again to keep Alan and Elsa Von Rader, a German woman, away from each other. The next morning, Pete runs into Miss Potts, who happens to be his old friend. Back in Pete's cabin, Zoe and Vera escape through the window and lounge outside, covering themselves with a blanket. Pete tells Miss Potts both women are his nieces, who are actually heading for Paris.

Alan and Laurie continue their flirtatious relationship, in which she becomes romantically interested in him. By the time the liner reaches Havana, Alan has grown detached from Elsa, but has fallen in love with Laurie. In response, Pete wants Alan separated from Laurie. On the last night of the cruise, Laurie sees Elsa walk into Alan's cabin, where Alan decides to break up with Elsa. Feeling betrayed, Laurie snubs Alan after the liner docks in California. There, Pete reunites with Grace, and pays off Zoe and Vera.

Back home, Pete tells Alan the truth, and decides to track down the letter. Knowing the truth, Alan tries to amend his relationship with Laurie. She eventually forgives him, and the two are engaged to be married. During their travels, Pete hires a police officer to arrest Alan to prevent the marriage. Grace eventually meets with Miss Potts and learns about Vera and Zoe, as well as Alan's proposed marriage to Laurie. Meanwhile, Pete believes that he has burnt Alan's letter. After Alan and Laurie are married, and leave for their honeymoon, Grace reveals she has read the letter as Pete shrieks in horror.

== Cast ==
- Charles Ruggles as Pete Wells
- Phil Harris as Alan Chandler
- Helen Mack as Laurie Marlowe
- Greta Nissen as Elsa Von Rader
- Chick Chandler as Hickey
- June Brewster as Zoe
- Shirley Chambers as Vera
- Florence Roberts as Miss Potts
- Marjorie Gateson as Grace Wells
- Betty Grable as a stewardess (uncredited)

== Box office ==
The movie made a profit of $150,000.

== Reception ==
New York Times critic Mordaunt Hall found the film to be a "conventional farce", but praised "the imaginative direction of Mark Sandrich, who is alert in seizing any opportunity for cinematic stunts" and whose work gave the production "a foreign aspect" with "some extraordinarily clever photography".
