= Associated Motion Picture Advertisers =

Advertising organization

The Associated Motion Picture Advertisers (also known as the Association of Motion Picture Advertisers) was an organization founded in New York City in 1916.

The founding members of the association were: Arthur James, Metro Pictures; Harry Reichenbach, Frohman Amusement Company; S. B. Van Horn, World Film Company; Wallace Thompson, Paramount Pictures; Hopp Hadley, Mutual Film; A. S. Levino, Arrow Film; Terry Ramsaye, Mutual Film; Harry King Toole, Gaumont, Paul Gulick, Universal; Nat G. Rothstein, Universal; Joe Brandt, Universal; Julian M. Solomon Jr., Morosco-Pallas; Henry James, Metro Pictures; Charles E. Moyer, Paramount Pictures; E. Richard Schayer, L. J. Selznick Enterprises; E. Lanning Masters, V-L-S-E, Incorporated; Victor Mansfield Shapiro, V-L-S-E, Incorporated George T. Gerhard, V-L-S-E, Incorporated; Jacques Kopfstein, Ivan Film; John C. Flinn, Jesse L. Lasky Feature Play Company; Carl H. Pierce, Oliver Morosco Photoplay Company; Pete Schmid, Pallas Pictures; Charles C. Burr, Paramount Pictures; Ben Schulberg, Famous Players Film Company.

The organization remained active for the next four decades.
