= Eli Nadel =

American actor

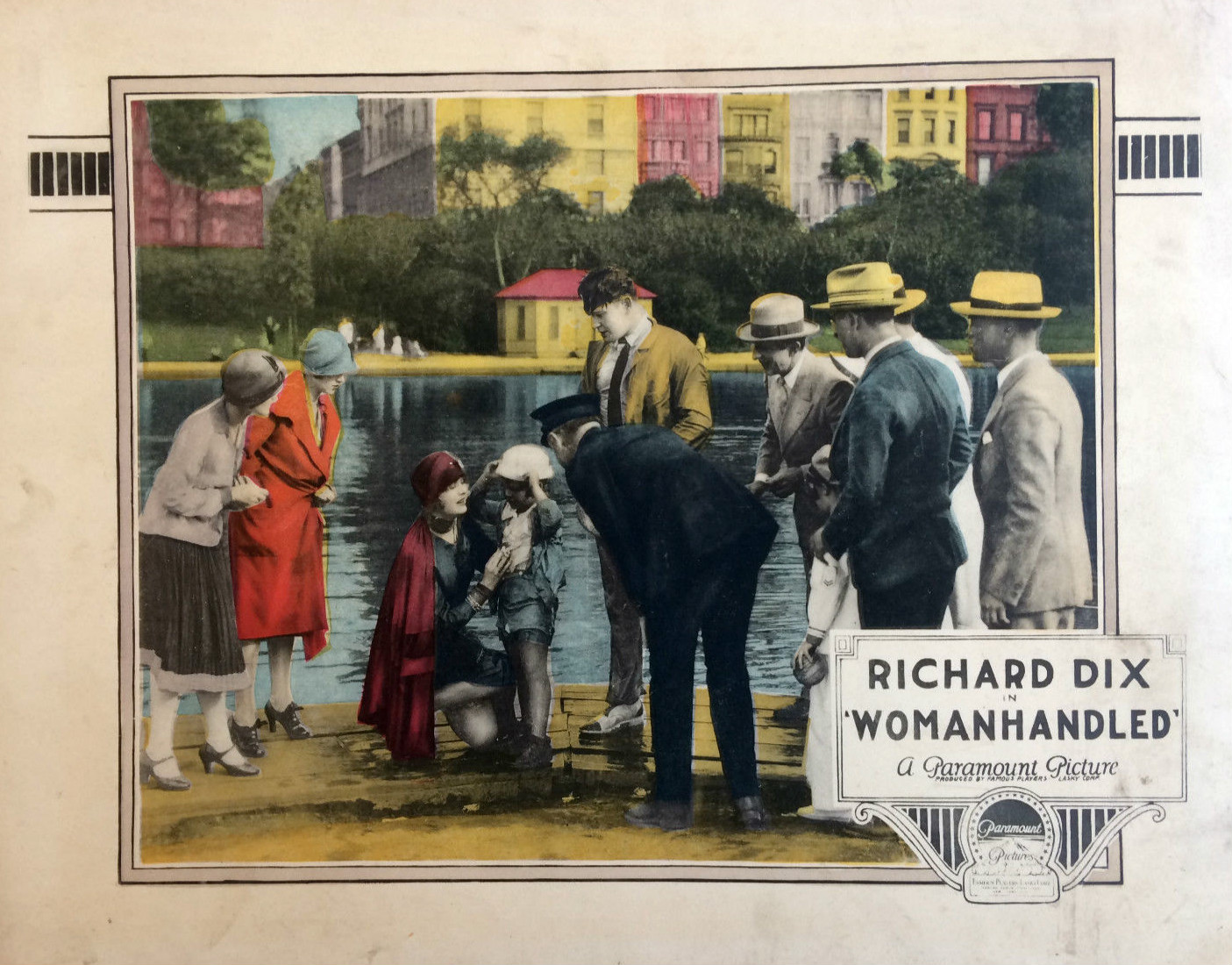
Lobby card for Womanhandled (1925).

Eliah Maurice Nadel (October 9, 1918 – March 9, 1981) was an American child actor born in the Bronx, New York. He appeared in Fox Film's Sunshine Comedy series of short comedy films. He was "The Kid" in the 1925 Famous Players–Lasky feature Womanhandled.

After his film career he studied medicine and, as a career physician, worked for the Cancer Control Branch of the National Cancer Institute, where he developed the biometric considerations that were relevant to testing for cancer.

Later, he joined the Research Service of the Veteran's Administration, serving as Chief, Research in Pathology and Laboratory Medicine from 1966 to 1968. He left the VA in 1970 and became Associate Dean and Professor of Pathology at the St. Louis University School of Medicine in St. Louis, Missouri.
