= Get That Venus =

1933 film

- Directed by: Arthur Varney
- Written by: Val Valentine
- Starring: Ernest Truex; Jean Arthur; Harry Davenport
- Cinematography: Marcel Le Picard; Nick Rogelli
- Production company: Starmark Productions
- Distributed by: Regent Pictures
- Release date: September 1933
- Country: United States
- Language: English

Get That Venus is a 1933 American comedy film directed by Arthur Varney and starring Ernest Truex, Jean Arthur and Harry Davenport.

== Cast ==
- Ernest Truex as Tim Wilson
- Jean Arthur as Margaret Rendleby
- Harry Davenport as Mr. Rendleby
- Tom Howard as Joe Smiley
- Herbert Rawlinson as Editor Nash
- Molly O'Day as Belle
- May Vokes as Mrs. Murphy
- Stanley Harrison as Fishkins
- Olga Anson as Mrs. Georgina Van Aster
- Wesley Barry in a bit part
- Donald MacBride

== Bibliography ==
- Koszarski, Richard. Hollywood on the Hudson: Film and Television in New York from Griffith to Sarnoff. Rutgers University Press, 2008.
