= The Timid Young Man =

1935 film

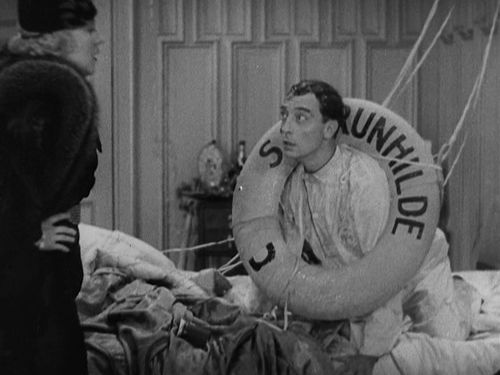
- Directed by: Mack Sennett
- Written by: Glen Lambert
- Produced by: E.H. Allen; E. W. Hammons
- Starring: Buster Keaton
- Cinematography: Dwight Warren
- Release date: October 25, 1935
- Running time: 20 minutes
- Country: United States
- Language: English

The Timid Young Man is a 1935 American short comedy film directed by Mack Sennett and starring Buster Keaton.

== Plot ==
Helen (Andre), a bride to be who has been pressured into marriage by her father flees the church before her husband to be arrives. At the same time Milton (Keaton) is woken up by a stranger he drunkenly agreed to marry the night before, who tells him they have a wedding scheduled in a few minutes time. Milton runs off intent on living in the mountains for the foreseeable future. On his way he stops to pick up a hitchhiker who turns out to be Helen and the two decide to go on the run together.

On their journey they have a heated standoff with an aggressive driver named Mortimer who refuses to back up and end up running him off the road. Later that day as Helen sets up camp, Milton goes fishing and catches many fish by throwing Mexican jumping beans into the water which makes the fish jump into his net.

Milton arrives back at the camp at the same time as Mortimer who he persuades not to hurt him in exchange for a meal. Mortimer steals the key to Milton's car and chases Helen into the tent in order to kiss her but when he emerges he sees that Helen has escaped the tent and he has in fact been kissing Milton. Helen convinces Milton to go swimming with her so that Milton can retrieve the key to the car from his clothes.

Milton's jilted fiancée arrives at the lake and tries to force Milton to return to town with her. Helen sees Milton and his fiancée and leaves heartbroken. While Milton's fiancée is trying to force Mortimer to return the key to the car, Milton realizes that he put on the drivers pants when he emerged from the lake and the key is in the pocket. Milton drives off and catches up with Helen and the two gleefully reunite.

== Cast ==
- Buster Keaton as Milton
- Lona Andre as Helen
- Tiny Sandford as Mortimer (as Stanley J. Sandford)
- Kitty McHugh as Milton's fiancée
- Harry Bowen as Milton's Valet
- Don Brodie as Desk Clerk (uncredited)
- James C. Morton as Helen's Father (uncredited)

== See also ==
- Buster Keaton filmography
