= The Chemist (film) =

1936 film

- Directed by: Al Christie
- Written by: David Freedman
- Produced by: Al Christie; E. W. Hammons
- Starring: Buster Keaton
- Cinematography: Dwight Warren; George Webber
- Release date: October 9, 1936
- Running time: 19 minutes
- Country: United States
- Language: English

The Chemist is a 1936 American short comedy film featuring Buster Keaton.

== Plot ==
Elmer Triple is a chemist who is a constant source of frustration to his professor boss, who feels that while he showed promise at a young age he has ultimately never used his gifts for anything useful. Elmer aims to correct him by showing a series of concoctions he has developed. The first liquidizes an entire breakfast which can then be consumed in one gulp. Elmer's second invention can make things grow to three times their original size, which he demonstrates on a parrot and a goldfish. Elmer's final invention is a candy which he claims will make women fall in love with the first person they see. Elmer gives his candy to a young woman who turns out to be the girlfriend of a gangster. The girl falls instantly in love with Elmer and when the gangster sees the two kissing he throws Elmer back into his laboratory. He has only one of the candies left and nut it gets lost in a box of regular chocolates. He attempts to give the candy to an attractive secretary, but he himself ends up eating his specially created one and passionately kisses the secretary and subsequently receiving a beating.

The professor is unimpressed with Elmer's inventions and tells him he'd better invent something useful soon. While trying to invent noiseless fire crackers, Elmer unwittingly invents an explosive yet noiseless powder which the head of the university theorizes could be used in war zones. Elsewhere the gangster learns of the explosive powder in the paper and realizes he could use it to blow open bank vaults. The gangster and his two associates dress up as professors, convince Elmer they are there to inspect the powder and take him with them to a bank which they then hold up. When his attempts to blow up the safe, Elmer realizes he has brought his love powder instead of his explosive powder. The gang march Elmer back to the university and get him to demonstrate how the powder works. Elmer shows them that the powder explodes when brought into contact with water. Before they can make their way back to the bank, Elmer covers the gangsters in the powder and threatens to spray them with water until they turn themselves in. After taking the gangsters to the police station Elmer is hailed as a genius by numerous other professors to the university and offers them some of the growth formula he demonstrated earlier which they accept. Outside the police station Elmer is spotted by the gangster's girlfriend who is still in love with him and the two kiss. However the two are soon chased down the street by the professors who have in fact shrunken down to the size of dwarfs due to Elmer supplying them with the wrong formula.

== Cast ==
- Buster Keaton as Elmer Triple
- Marlyn Stuart
- Earle Gilbert
- Donald MacBride
- Herman Lieb

== See also ==
- List of American films of 1936
- Buster Keaton filmography
