= Blue Blazes (1936 film) =

1936 film

- Directed by: Raymond Kane; Buster Keaton (uncredited)
- Written by: David Freedman
- Produced by: Al Christie; E. W. Hammons
- Starring: Buster Keaton
- Cinematography: Dwight Warren; George Webber
- Release date: August 21, 1936
- Running time: 17 minutes
- Country: United States
- Language: English

Blue Blazes is a 1936 American short comedy film directed by Raymond Kane and starring Buster Keaton.

== Plot ==
Elmer (Buster Keaton) is the most inept fireman at a big-city fire department. The chief transfers him to a small suburban station, where he is so unfamiliar with his surroundings that he gets lost. The chief's daughters, who live in the same small town, want to sneak out for a double date, so they call the fire department to help them escape. Nobody is at the station except Elmer, who improvises a makeshift fire engine from random tools and answers the call himself. Meanwhile, the chief's house has genuinely caught fire, and Elmer's fast action saves the chief's family and returns the heroic fireman to the city.

== Cast ==
- Buster Keaton as Elmer
- Arthur L. Jarrett as Fire chief
- Marlyn Stuart as the chief's blonde daughter
- Rose Kessner as the chief's wife
- Patty Willson as the chief's brunette daughter

This film was produced by Educational Pictures, where Buster Keaton was under contract to star in 20-minute comedy shorts. Educational had units working on both coasts, but in 1936 it was making most of its films at its New York facility. Blue Blazes was one of three short comedies that Buster Keaton filmed in New York for Educational.

Keaton himself staged most of the action in Blue Blazes but declined to take credit as the film's director. He gave the screen credit to staff writer Raymond Kane. Another staff writer, Arthur Jarrett, appeared in the film as the fire chief.

Marlyn Stuart was a Ziegfeld showgirl then working in New York stage and film productions. She was appearing in Educational's "Young Romance" shorts when she was assigned the ingenue role in Blue Blazes. Keaton saw her socially, escorting her to restaurants and nightclubs. She also appeared opposite Keaton in his other two New York shorts, Mixed Magic and The Chemist.

== See also ==
- List of American films of 1936
- Buster Keaton filmography
