= Palmy Days =

1931 film by A. Edward Sutherland

- Theatrical release poster
- Directed by: A. Edward Sutherland
- Written by: Eddie Cantor; Morrie Ryskind; David Freedman
- Produced by: Samuel Goldwyn
- Starring: Eddie Cantor; Charlotte Greenwood; George Raft
- Cinematography: Gregg Toland
- Edited by: Sherman Todd
- Music by: Harry Akst
- Production company: Samuel Goldwyn Productions
- Distributed by: United Artists
- Release date: September 23, 1931
- Running time: 77 minutes
- Country: United States
- Language: English
- Box office: $1,601,000

Palmy Days is a 1931 American Pre-Code musical comedy film written by Eddie Cantor, Morrie Ryskind, and David Freedman, directed by A. Edward Sutherland, and choreographed by Busby Berkeley (who makes a cameo appearance as a fortune teller). The film stars Eddie Cantor. The famed Goldwyn Girls make appearances during elaborate production numbers set in a gymnasium and a bakery ("Glorifying the American Doughnut"). Betty Grable, Paulette Goddard, Virginia Grey, and Toby Wing are among the bevy of chorines. George Raft had an early role.

== Plot ==
Eddie Simpson is an assistant to a phony psychic, Dr. Yolando. Yolando tries to install one of his henchmen as an efficiency expert in a large bakery in order to swindle money out of its owner, Mr. Clark. However, bumbling but honest Eddie accidentally gets the job instead and tries to protect Mr. Clark from Dr. Yolando.

Eddie falls in love with Mr. Clark's daughter, but she's already in love with another man. Meanwhile, the bakery's awkward but well-meaning fitness instructor, Helen Martin, falls in love with Eddie. Eddie performs song and dance routines for the bakery's customers that drive sales through the roof, and Mr. Clark plans to pay his employees a generous cash bonus. Eddie is entrusted with the cash overnight, but Yolando finds out about the bonus and sends his goons after Eddie. Helen helps Eddie in his frantic struggle to protect the money. Eventually, Dr. Yolando incriminates himself. The money is saved, securing Eddie's position as Mr. Clark's trusted right-hand man, and Eddie realizes he actually loves Helen instead of Mr. Clark's daughter. The smitten Helen already had a minister on standby, so she and Eddie get married on the spot.

== Cast (in credits order) ==
- Charlotte Greenwood as Helen Martin
- Barbara Weeks as Joan Clark
- Spencer Charters as Mr Clark
- Paul Page as Steve
- Charles Middleton as Yolando
- George Raft as Joe – Yolando's Henchman
- Harry Woods as Yolando's Henchman
- Eddie Cantor as Eddie Simpson

== Music ==
Cantor's major musical numbers are "My Baby Said Yes, Yes" and "There's Nothing Too Good For My Baby".

== Reception ==
The film was one of the most popular movies of the year.

New York Times movie critic Mordaunt Hall, described Palmy Days as "a more or less funny diatribe" with "two or three inconsequential melodies and a great deal to gaze, including pretty damsels from the Pacific Coast and effectively photographed groups of dancers."

== Product placement ==
Brand-name products rarely appeared in movies of this period, partly because of the campaign against that practice by the motion picture trade periodical Harrison's Reports. In an editorial, that publication reported the on-screen appearance of an Underwood Typewriter and product of Continental Baking Company.

== See also ==
- List of American films of 1931
