= Womanhandled =

1925 film

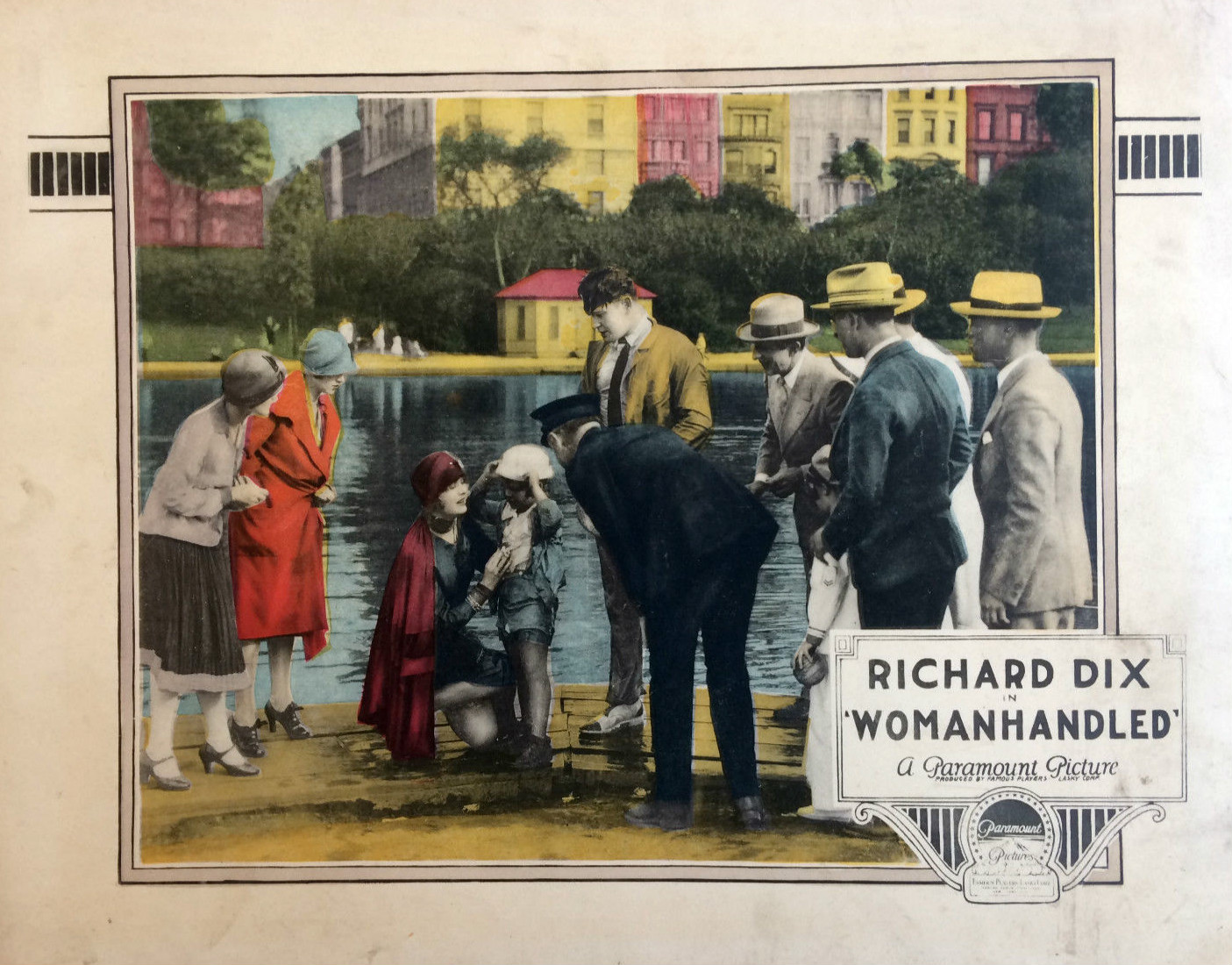
- Lobby card
- Directed by: Gregory La Cava
- Written by: Arthur Stringer (story); Luther Reed (adaptation)
- Produced by: Adolph Zukor; Jesse Lasky
- Starring: Richard Dix; Esther Ralston
- Cinematography: Edward Cronjager
- Distributed by: Paramount Pictures
- Release date: December 28, 1925
- Running time: 7 reels (6,765 feet)
- Country: United States
- Language: Silent (English intertitles)

Womanhandled is a 1925 American silent comedy film produced by Famous Players–Lasky and distributed through Paramount Pictures. It is based on a short story by Arthur Stringer and stars Richard Dix and Esther Ralston.

== Plot ==
Bill Dana meets Mollie in the park and is smitten. Mollie expresses admiration for the rugged men of the west, and Bill decides to go to his Uncle Lester's ranch to man up and deserve Mollie's love. Upon arrival he finds that the west isn't quite so wild anymore, with cowboys herding cows in cars and his uncle spending a lot of time on the golf course. Bill settles in to enjoy his stay, but after a while Mollie announces she is coming for a visit. Bill and Uncle Lester cook up a plan to pass as rugged for a day or so, forcing the cowboys onto horses and dressing the servants up as Native Americans, and Mollie is fooled. When she decides to stay longer, Bill puts on a show of being too rugged. He eats with atrocious table manners and picks a fight with a farmhand. Mollie decides she preferred him un-rugged.

== Cast ==
- Richard Dix as Bill Dana
- Esther Ralston as Mollie
- Edmund Breese as Uncle Lester
- Cora Williams as Aunt Abby
- Olive Tell as Gwen
- Margaret Morris as Iris Vale
- Tammany Young as Spike
- Eli Nadel as The Kid
- Basset Blakely as Cow Hand
- Edgar Nelson Pinky (uncredited)
- Ivan Simpson as Butler (uncredited)

== Preservation ==
A print of Womanhandled is held at the Library of Congress.
