= Harry Reichenbach =

American press agent and publicist

- Born: 1882; Frostburg, Maryland, U.S.
- Died: 1931
- Known for: Film promotion

Harry Reichenbach (1882 – 1931) was an American press agent and publicist who staged sensational publicity stunts to promote films. He was one of the founding members of the Associated Motion Picture Advertisers.

== Biography ==
Born in Frostburg, Maryland, in 1882, Reichenbach worked both for actors as an agent and for the film studios as a promoter. Among his first jobs was to promote a woman called "Sober Sue" who was said never to smile. He got her a contract at the Victoria Theater on Broadway and suggested they offer $1,000 to any New York comedian who could make her laugh.

Between 1914-1916 he served as publicity director for various motion picture companies: Jesse L. Lasky Feature Play Co., Alco Film Corp., Bosworth Inc., Metro Pictures, Equitable Motion Picture Corp., World Film Co., and Frohman Amusement Corp.

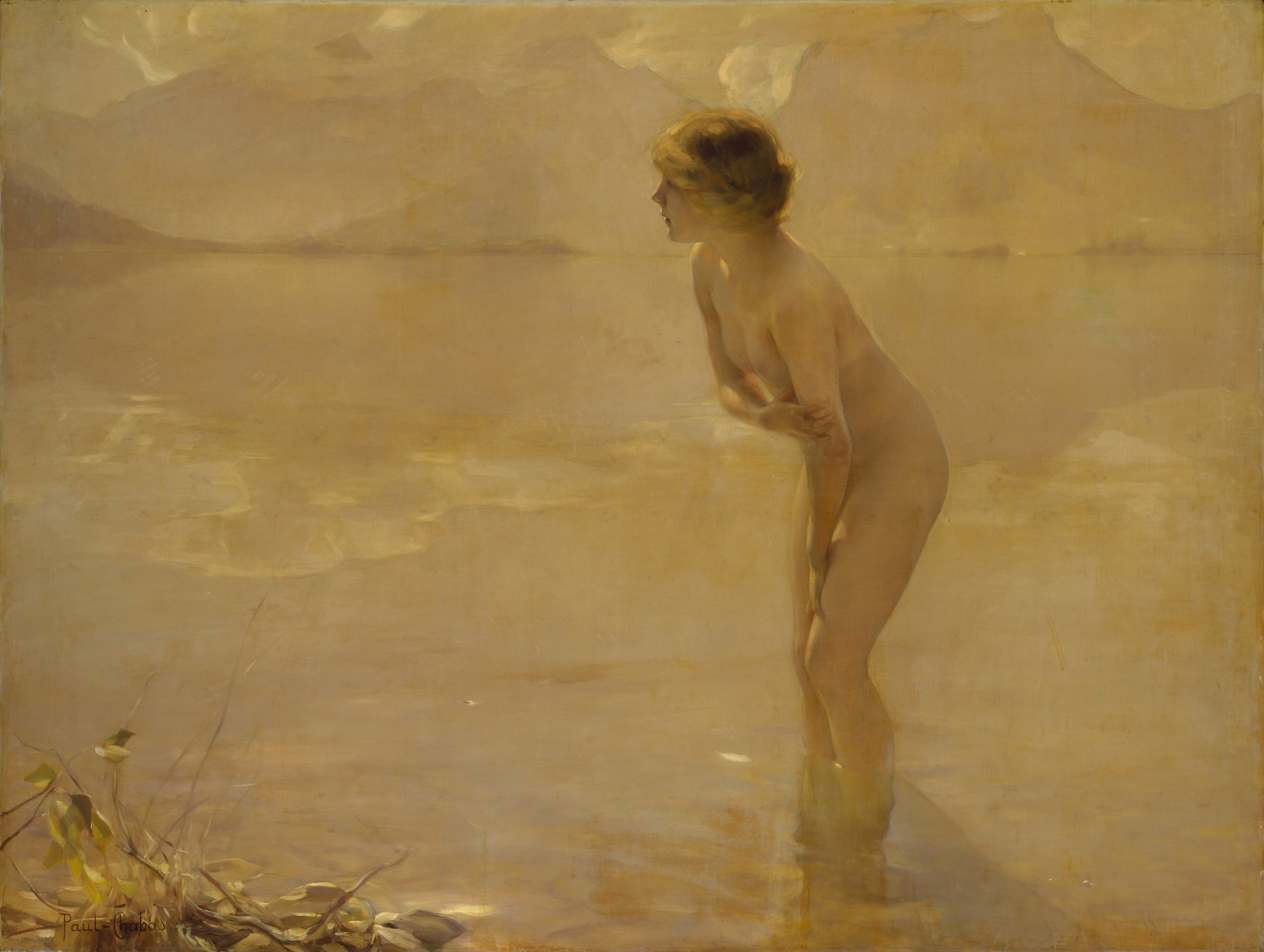
September Morn, a painting that Reichenbach claims to have popularized

Reichenbach claims to have popularized lithographs of the 1913 nude painting September Morn while working at an art shop in New York, by having accomplices complain to the New York Society for the Suppression of Vice about the shop window display that he himself had arranged, and by staging a crowd outside the shop. Reichenbach's story has been questioned, as the painting became notorious in Chicago before New York, and records only show a New York art shop complaining of lost business as a result.

For the 1915 film Trilby, which included nude scenes and hypnotism, Reichenbach hired a young woman to run several times around the block and take a seat besides him just before the movie ended. She looked agitated and exhausted and Reichenbach hinted that the hypnosis scenes in the movie might have something to do with it. He also arranged that various psychologists would speculate on possible effects of hypnosis through cinema.

In December 1916 Reichenbach founded his own public relations company. To promote the sequel the Return of Tarzan, Reichenbach hired an actor who checked into the Hotel Bellclaire under the name "Thomas R. Zann". Zann had a huge crate that was hoisted to his room through a window, and upon arrival he ordered fifteen pounds of raw beef to be sent to his room. When the cook and the hotel detective arrived, they found that the meat was for the guest's pet lion. Hotel called for police and the "Mr Zann" explained to them and the press that the lion would be appearing at the opening of the new Tarzan film.

By the 1920's Reichenbach's status as a provacateur was well established, so much so that in July of 1920 Reichenbach was accused by New York City district attorney Edward Swann of staging the disaperance and planting the suicide note of a Japanese woman in order to promote a film.

In other publicity stunts, Reichenbach would stage fake kidnappings of actresses set to appear in his films. One attempt involved crossing the border into Mexico, which resulted in United States president Woodrow Wilson writing an angry letter to Reichenbach asking him to stop.

One of the actors Reichenbach worked for was Rudolf Valentino. Reichenbach convinced him to grow a goatee beard upon his return to the United States in 1924, with the intention of causing a negative public reaction which could be made good by shaving it off. Reichenbach then spoke at the Associated Master Barbers convention, calling for a boycott of Valentino films until he removed his beard. The story ran for months in American newspapers.

In 1928, Reichenbach was managing the Colony Theater in New York City and took Walt Disney's animated film Steamboat Willie for a two-week run.

When Reichenbach was working for actor Francis X. Bushman, he took him to see studio executives. He began to walk with Bushman from the railway station and dropped pennies to the street from his pocket. Many people followed them, picking up the coins. The crowd gave the studio executives an impression that Bushman was very popular and they signed him up for a big contract with Metro Pictures.

For The Virgin of Stamboul, he hired actors to pose as a clandestine Turkish rescue party that was hunting for a royal bride who had eloped with an American soldier. Reichenbach leaked the details to the press. His 1931 book, Phantom Fame, written with David Freedman, was the basis of the 1932 film The Half-Naked Truth.

Harry Reichenbach died July 4, 1931.
