= The Half Naked Truth =

1932 comedy film

- Directed by: Gregory La Cava
- Written by: Ben Markson; H.N. Swanson
- Screenplay by: Gregory La Cava; Corey Ford; Bartlett Cormack
- Based on: The Anatomy of Ballyhoo: Phantom Fame; 1931 book by David Freedman; Harry Reichenbach
- Produced by: Pandro S. Berman
- Starring: Lupe Vélez; Lee Tracy
- Cinematography: Bert Glennon
- Edited by: Charles L. Kimball
- Music by: Max Steiner
- Distributed by: RKO Radio Pictures
- Release date: December 16, 1932
- Running time: 77 minutes
- Country: United States
- Language: English

The Half Naked Truth is a 1932 American pre-Code comedy film starring Lee Tracy and Lupe Vélez, with Frank Morgan and Eugene Pallette in support. Directed by Gregory La Cava, it was released on December 16, 1932 by RKO Radio Pictures. The plot features Tracy as a carnival pitchman who finagles his girlfriend, a fiery hoochie dancer played by Vélez, into a major Broadway revue under the auspices of an impresario portrayed by Morgan.

== Plot ==
Fast-talking Jimmy Bates takes responsibility for publicity for a struggling carnival owned by Colonel Munday. His latest scheme to attract customers involves promising to reveal the identity of the father (allegedly one of the local town's residents) of his hot-tempered girlfriend, "hootch dancer" Teresita. However, when the local sheriff learns that it is all a con, Bates and his friends Achilles and Teresita flee to New York City.

Bates has always bragged about his close friendship with powerful theater impresario Merle Farrell. Bates promises to make Teresita a star, but it soon becomes clear that Farrell does not know him. Undaunted, Bates promotes Teresita as Princess Exotica, an escapee from a Turkish harem, with Achilles as a eunuch servant and a lion. Bates informs reporters that she is to star in Farrell's show. At first, Farrell is outraged, but after a sharp increase in ticket sales, he signs Teresita to a contract.

Farrell insists that Teresita perform a slow Middle Eastern-style dance, which bores the audience. Bates instructs her to sing a modern song, which is a hit. Teresita becomes a star, while Bates becomes Farrell's publicity manager.

With Bates away on a business trip, Teresita begins a romance with the married Farrell. When Bates learns of the affair, he quits Farrell's employ and promises to make the first girl whom he sees into a sensation that will eclipse Teresita's stardom. The girl whom he selects is blond hotel maid Gladys, whom Achilles is trying to romance. Bates has Gladys pretend to be Eve, the leader of a group of nudists. Armed with a compromising photograph of Farrell and Teresita, Bates blackmails Farrell into signing Eve to his show. Meanwhile, the public has begun to tire of Teresita.

Achilles returns to the carnival life and purchases Colonel Munday's business. Bates later becomes dissatisfied with New York and visits Achilles, and he finds Teresita singing as one of the carnival's attractions.

== Cast ==
- Lupe Velez as Teresita, also known as La Belle Sultana and Princess Exotica
- Lee Tracy as Jimmy Bates
- Eugene Pallette as Achilles
- Frank Morgan as Merle Farrell
- Shirley Chambers as Gladys
- Franklin Pangborn as Hotel Clerk
- Robert McKenzie as Colonel Munday
- Mary Mason as Miss Mason - Secretary
- Theresa Harris as Emily (uncredited)
