= Lulu McConnell =

American actress (1882–1962)

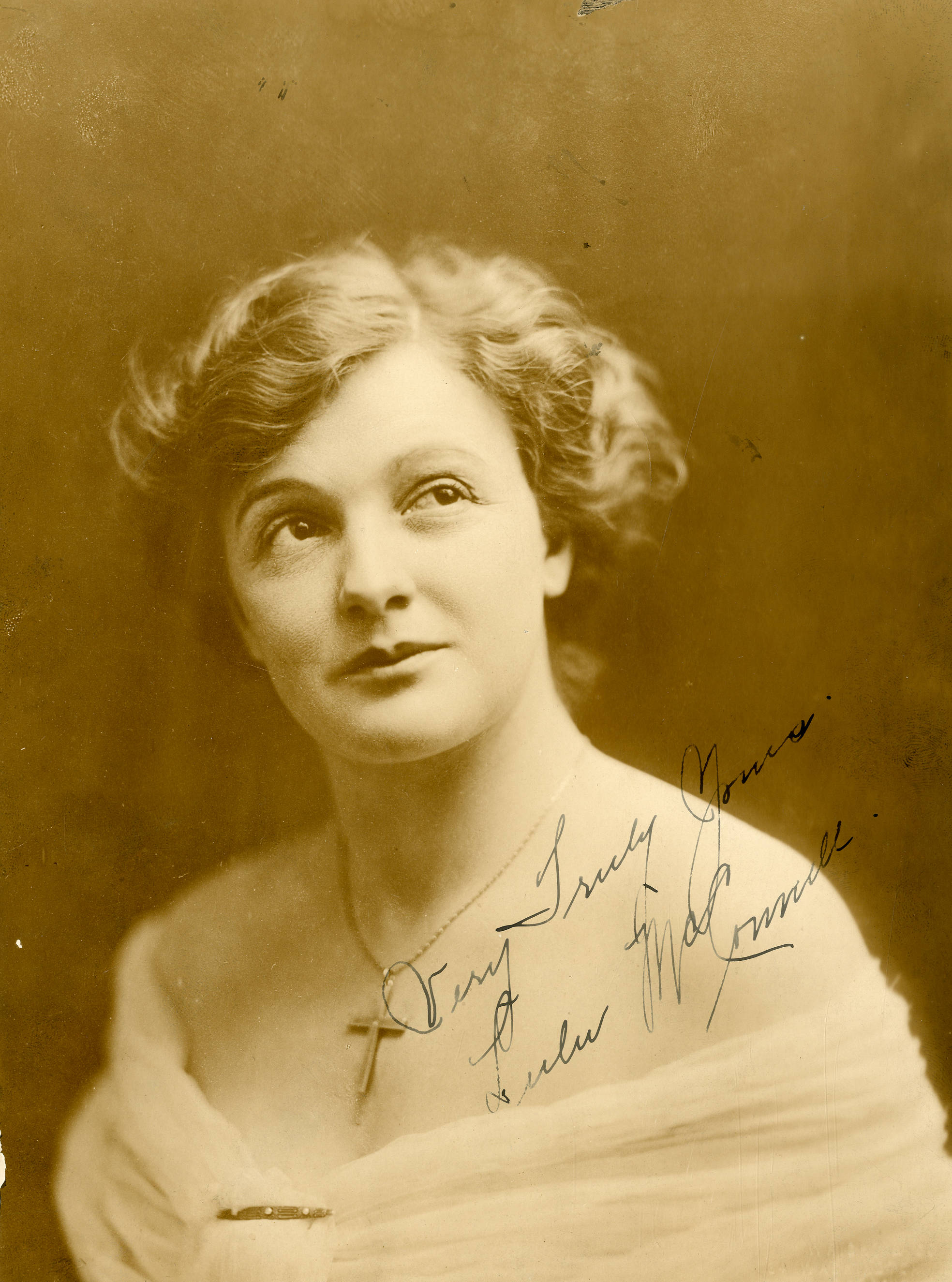
- A 1912 publicity photo of McConnell
- Born: April 8, 1882; Kansas City, Missouri, United States
- Died: October 9, 1962 (aged 80); New York City, New York, United States
- Occupation: Actress

Lulu McConnell (April 8, 1882 – October 9, 1962) was an American comic actress who performed in vaudeville, Broadway musicals, radio, and television. She was best known as a panelist on the comedic radio show It Pays to be Ignorant, and for her distinctive raspy voice.

McConnell was born in Kansas City, Missouri in 1882. She began acting in church socials, and at the age of 17, joined a repertory theatre company, and later moved to the vaudeville circuit. She married fellow vaudeville performer Grant Simpson in 1907.

She attributed her trademark "sawblade" voice to an instance of stage fright when performing at the Alhambra Theatre in 1910, causing her to lose her voice and rasp through the performance, to the approval of the audience.

Between 1920 and 1937, McConnell performed in a number of Broadway shows at the Winter Garden Theatre. In 1936, she appeared in two feature films: the musical Stage Struck, and comedy Lady Luck. Toward the end of her career she performed on the popular comedy radio show It Pays to Be Ignorant, which aired from 1942 to 1951. A parody of the quiz show format, the show featured McConnell and two other regular panelists giving amusing incorrect answers to general knowledge questions.

McConnell died in 1962 in New York City, where she resided, whilst visiting the home of a former maid.
