= It Pays to Be Ignorant =

US radio and television parody of panel quiz shows

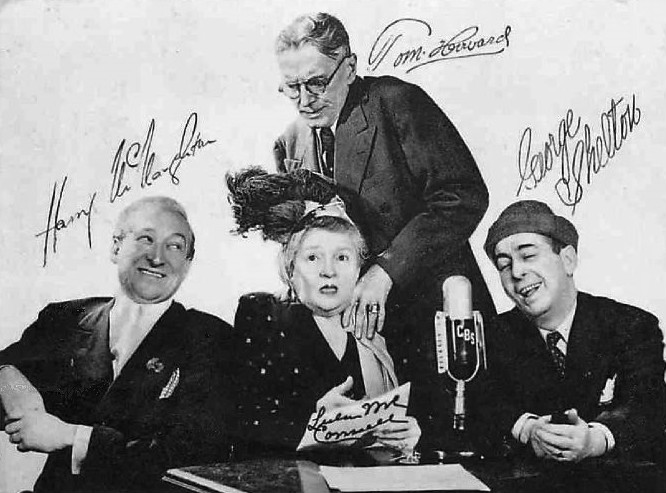
- At front, from left: Harry McNaughton, Lulu McConnell and George Shelton. Master of Ceremonies Tom Howard is standing.
- Genre: Comedy
- Running time: 30 minutes
- Country of origin: United States
- Language: English
- Syndicates: Mutual; CBS; NBC
- TV adaptations: It Pays to Be Ignorant
- Hosted by: Tom Howard
- Announcer: Ken Roberts; Dick Stark
- Created by: Tom Howard
- Original release: June 25, 1942 – September 26, 1951
- Sponsored by: Philip Morris; Chrysler; DeSoto

It Pays to Be Ignorant is a 1942–1951 radio comedy show which maintained its popularity during a nine-year run on three networks for such sponsors as Philip Morris, Chrysler, and DeSoto. The series was a spoof on the academic discourse on such authoritative panel series as Quiz Kids and Information Please. At the same time, the beginning of the program parodied the popular quiz show Doctor I.Q. The show featured announcers Ken Roberts and Dick Stark. The program was broadcast on Mutual from June 25, 1942 to February 28, 1944, on CBS from February 25, 1944 to September 27, 1950 and finally on NBC from July 4, 1951 to September 26, 1951. The series typically aired as a summer replacement.

== Panelists ==
The satirical series featured "a board of experts who are dumber than you are and can prove it". The show's creator, Tom Howard, was also the quizmaster who asked panelists Harry McNaughton, Lulu McConnell and George Shelton questions. The Irish-born Howard (1885–1955) and Shelton (1885–1972) had previously worked together as a team in vaudeville and comedy film shorts, while McConnell (1882–1962) and British comic McNaughton (1896–1967) had both appeared in many Broadway musical comedies and revues between 1920 and the late 1930s.

== Q&A ==
Each episode would start with some jokes ("Do married men live longer than single men?"... "No, it only seems longer.") and an introduction of the experts. After this, three or four questions would be discussed in detail: some posed by Howard, some picked at random by a guest from the audience. These questions often had the answer obvious in the query ("What town in Massachusetts had the Boston Tea Party?") or were common knowledge:

- "Can you tell me the man's name children look for on Christmas Eve?"
- "How long does it take a ship to make a five-day journey?"
- "What animal does a blacksmith make horse shoes for?"
- "For what meal do we wear a dinner jacket?"
- "What is the habitat of the Bengal tiger?"

Even so, the panelists would inevitably get the answer wrong, providing outrageously funny answers instead, followed by an even more uproarious rationale for their answer, a conversation that goes off on a tangent, and/or insults at each other. The show had a number of running gags which became catchphrases with listeners such as McNaughton's "Now we're back to Miss McConnell again" and Shelton's "I used to woik in that town."

== Television ==
It Pays to Be Ignorant
- Created by: Tom Howard
- Presented by: Tom Howard; Joe Flynn
- Country of origin: United States
- No. of seasons: 3

Production
- Running time: 30 minutes
- Production companies: Tom Howard Productions (1949-1951); Hatos-Hall Productions (1973-1974)

Original release
- Network: CBS
- Release: June 6 – September 19, 1949
- Network: NBC
- Release: July 5 – September 27, 1951
- Network: Syndication
- Release: September 10, 1973 – September 1974

The original radio cast brought the show to television. It was first seen on CBS from June 6 to September 19, 1949. After two years, the series returned on NBC from July 5 to September 27, 1951; by this point, Howard (who appeared in this version in an elaborate cap and gown outfit) did not acknowledge that the 1949 episodes ever happened (a surviving episode from the 1951 run implied that the show had never appeared on television before). A spoof of this version was done in the mid-1950s by Jackie Gleason.

The series was revived by Stefan Hatos-Monty Hall Productions as a weekly syndicated series from September 10, 1973 to September 1974. In this version, host Joe Flynn queried panelists Jo Anne Worley, Billy Baxter and Charles Nelson Reilly (Worley and Reilly appeared concurrently as semi-regulars on the TV show Match Game; Reilly became a regular panelist on that show by the time It Pays to Be Ignorant ended this run). Not long after this version discontinued production, Flynn died from drowning in his swimming pool.

== Episode status ==
At least 69 radio episodes are known to exist. These include those listed below and three held by the UCLA Film and Television Archive.

One 1951 television episode and two syndicated TV episodes are known to exist; the latter two are held by the UCLA Film and Television Archive. Further, two films also exist at the Library of Congress in the J. Fred and Leslie W. MacDonald Collection: a CBS kinescope from 1949, and an NBC installment from June 14, 1951 with all the DeSoto automobile commercials

== Listen to ==
- OTR Network: It Pays to Be Ignorant (17 episodes from 1944-1951 episodes)
- Internet Archive: It Pays to Be Ignorant (31 episodes from 1943-1951, 4 episodes with unknown dates)
- Ignorant: It Pays to Be Ignorant (70 episodes from 1943-1951, 4 episodes with unknown dates)
- "It Pays To Be Ignorant". RadioEchoes. 1943–1952. 65 episodes.

== Watch ==
- Internet Archive: It Pays to Be Ignorant (lone known surviving 1951 episode)
