= Sylvia Froos =

American actress and singer

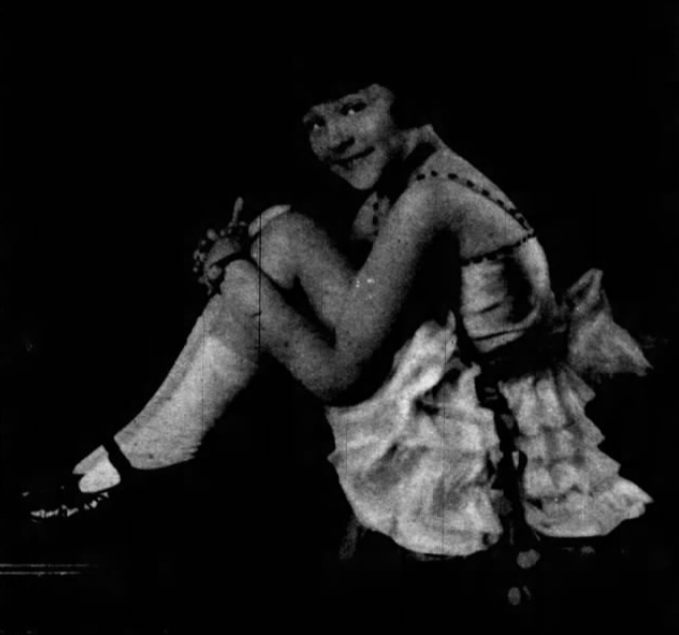
- Sylvia Froos (1924)
- Born: April 19, 1914; New York City, U.S.
- Died: March 28, 2004 (aged 89); New York City, U.S.
- Occupations: Actress, Vaudeville performer, Singer
- Years active: 1921–1934

Sylvia Froos (April 19, 1914 – March 28, 2004), sometimes spelled as Sylvia Fross, was an American actress and singer who appeared on stage, radio, recordings, television, and film during the 1920s through the 1940s. She was a child star that was sometimes billed as Baby Sylvia and as the "Little Princess of Song" and in the UK as "America's Queen of Song". She was also referred to as "The Miniature Belle Baker", with her ability to mimic the vocal performances of celebrities being particularly noted by the media, and was additionally likened to Sophie Tucker and Marion Harris.

== Career ==
=== Child performer ===
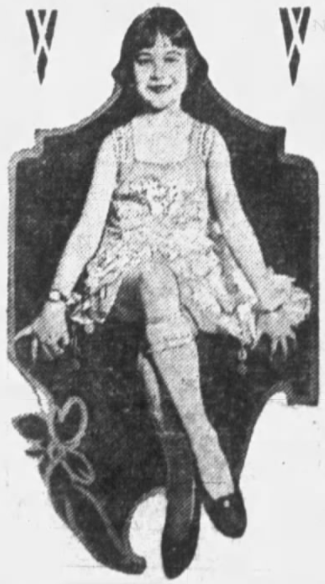
1923 photo

Born in New York City on April 19, 1914, Froos had wanted to be a singer since a young age. When she was four, she conducted a multi-song performance at the lodge owned by her father. Her mother forced her to leave, however, and was against her doing further performances. After three years of her repeatedly begging to be allowed to perform at her family's social parties with her mother only allowing her to do so rarely, she was noticed by a theatre booker at one of the social functions after singing accompaniment. Froos was able to convince her mother to, at the age of 7, allow her to act as a part of the Kiddie Cabaret group that performed vaudeville in Washington D.C.

She was confronted, however, by women of the Gerry Society backstage who were against child labor law violations. Because she didn't meet the minimum age requirements that the law required for dancing shows, she was forced to return home. When she was eight, she began appearing as "Baby Sylvia" in bookings across the country, including on the Keith Circuit, and was repeatedly confronted by members of the Gerry Society and she was taken to court after a performance in New Orleans. According to the law, dancing rather than singing was the violation, so the Gerry Society charged that she "wiggled while she sang", thus violating the law, but the judge had her sing several songs in the courtroom and requested she sing a "father song" for him someday before he dismissed the case. Froos claimed to have the record for number of child charges and arrests by the time she was 18 due to being actively pursued by child labor law advocates every time she performed.

In 1923, she engaged in a stage tour with the Octavia White Home and conducted vaudeville features in locations including the Bijou Theatre and a play performance at the New York Biltmore Hotel for Governor Al Smith and at the White House for Florence Harding. Her first radio performance was in 1925 as a part of the "Free Milk and Ice" fund run by the Fort Worth Star-Telegram. She also began starring in short film productions using Vitaphone in 1927.

=== Theatre ===
Her official Broadway debut was years later when she performed solo singing acts at the Palace Theatre in New York City. Once she was old enough to perform with them, she started touring with vaudeville groups nationally alongside other later famous figures including the Marx Brothers, Buddy Rogers, and Bing Crosby. She was signed for a role in the 1929 production of Gay Paree of 1928 by Jacob J. Shubert after he saw her perform at the Shubert Theatre just after her 18th birthday. In addition to doing shows on Broadway, she also spent the early part of 1930 doing performances in Florida before leaving to star in a singing role in a Fox Studios production called the Fox Follies in Hollywood. After completing the film production, she returned to being a radio host on the KHJ network in April 1934.

As vaudeville dropped in popularity in the United States during the 1930s, she expanded her tours to European venues. Froos had her first cabaret debut in 1936 at the Chez Paree in Chicago.

=== Music ===
The end of the 1920s saw Froos picked for a radio show for NBC and several years later in 1932 she moved to a show on WADC alongside Victor Moore, both focusing on her musical capabilities. In 1931, she was signed with Victor Records and produced a number of novelty songs, including Who's Your Little Who-Zis?

=== Film ===
By 1934 at the age of 20, Froos moved onto film roles and starred alongside Shirley Temple in Stand Up and Cheer! as the primary vocalist in addition to John Boles.

While most moviemaking was based in Hollywood, some of the major film companies maintained studios on the east coast in the 1930s, largely for the production of short subjects. In 1934 Sylvia Froos joined the ranks of many New York-based performers who took jobs at the Vitaphone and Educational studios. Educational usually co-starred her with singer Warren Hull in its "Young Romance" musical comedies, with such titles as All For One and Love in a Hurry.

== Later career ==
Sylvia Froos remained a popular singer and continued to work in New York. In 1938, she conducted another series of theatre tours in Europe and South America, before returning in January 1939 and starring at the Loew's Theatre in Montreal, Canada. In 1941 she appeared in seven three-minute musical films for the Soundies movie jukeboxes.

In 1944 she undertook a series of performances at military bases and hospitals across the United States. In 1951 she recorded a dialect novelty song, "A Satchel and a Seck," with then-novice comedian Allan Sherman for Jubilee Records. When Sherman became a major recording star with song parodies in 1962, Jubilee reissued the Froos-Sherman record.

== Theatre performances ==
- Gay Paree of 1928 (1929)

=== Vaudeville ===
- Crazy With the Heat (1941)
- Tons o' Fun (1945)

== Filmography ==
- The Little Princess of Song (1927), short
- A film clip of her singing "The Sun's in My Heart" is posted on YouTube. It is labelled as from 1932.
- Stand Up and Cheer! (1934)
- Soft Drinks and Sweet Music (1934), Vitaphone film
- All For One (1935)
- Love in a Hurry (1935), short
- School for Swing (1937), short
- Eddie Duchin & Orchestra with Sylvia Froos, a Vitaphone short

== Discography ==
- Who's Your Little Who-Zis? (1931) with the Victor Arden-Phil Ohman Orchestra
- Snuggled on Your Shoulder (1932)
- A Satchel and a Seck (1951) with Allan Sherman
