= Astor Pictures =

American film company

- Industry: Film distributor
- Founded: 1930; 96 years ago
- Defunct: 1963; 63 years ago
- Headquarters: New York City
- Key people: Robert M. Savini (1886–1956)

Astor Pictures was an American motion picture distribution company operating from 1930 to 1963. Founded by Robert M. Savini, it specialized in film re-releases. It later released independently made productions, including some of its own films made during the 1950s.

== History ==
Savini had worked in the film industry, including his own Savini Films in Atlanta, Georgia, that his brother took over. He worked in film exhibition for Columbia Pictures, then Sono Art-World Wide Pictures, then the KBS Film Company (Burt Kelly, Samuel Bischoff and William Saal) with World Wide handling the releases, then Tiffany Pictures. Savini teamed with Saal to form Amity Pictures in May 1933 that released films by Tiffany and other Poverty Row studios as well as producing their own films. In October 1933 Savini left the position of sales manager with Amity to start Astor Pictures.

During its first decade, Astor, located at 130 West 46th Street in New York City, primarily invested in other companies' films to acquire capital, and became parent company to Savini's first business, Atlantic Pictures, a film distribution exchange system located throughout the Southern United States. In 1939, Savini acquired the rights to other companies' motion pictures for profitable national re-release and put these out under the Astor name and logo. Among the first titles were revised sound versions of "Wings" and "Tumbleweeds" which Astor prepared, along with the complete library of Educational Pictures short subjects, Poverty Row westerns of the 1930s, and a number of Grand National Pictures' non-western product.

Subsequently, Astor began limited production of a variety of B-films, including a few race films, and co-financing other films produced by others, including some British B-mysteries, along with continued select reissues. The company focused on distribution to rural, small-town, and neighborhood theatres, not setting its sights too high, and thereby remained solvent throughout the Second World War years. A Billboard magazine article of 8 Jun 1946 stated Astor had 26 branch offices in the United States. In the 1950s, Astor created a subsidiary, Atlantic Television Corporation, for TV syndication of much of its earlier product, while continuing to engage in making new pictures, such as Cat-Women of the Moon, and picking up others for distribution, like Robot Monster.

In the late 1950s, however, Astor's fortunes began to fail, along with those of other companies like Republic Pictures and RKO Radio Pictures. Astor attempted to survive by distributing art films, such as La Dolce Vita and Peeping Tom but could not overcome the financial realities of the American motion picture industry at that time, nor its reputation for only marketing lesser films. By 1963, Astor was out of business.

== Types of Astor releases ==
- Acquired the non-Western film library of the defunct Grand National Pictures films for movie theater re-release after GNP's liquidation.
- Acquired the re-release rights of many films originally released by United Artists and RKO Radio Pictures.
- Reissued Boris Morros's productions of The Flying Deuces starring Laurel and Hardy (originally released by RKO) and Second Chorus starring Fred Astaire and Paulette Goddard (originally released by Paramount.)
- Acquired the re-release rights of Educational Pictures short subjects, such as Shirley Temple's Baby Burlesks.
- In addition to showing many of Bing Crosby's short subjects, also made for Educational Pictures, grouped four of them together and released them as a feature film titled The Road to Hollywood to compete with Paramount Pictures's Road to film series.
- Packaged three 1930s Betty Grable RKO shorts as the film Hollywood Bound (1947), three of Danny Kaye's Educational Pictures shorts as the film The Birth of a Star (1944), and four EP shorts starring Bob Hope, Milton Berle, Bert Lahr, and Willie Howard as the film It Pays to Be Funny (1947).
- Re-released William S. Hart's Tumbleweeds (1925) in 1939, with music and sound effects added and Hart speaking a prologue (his only sound appearance on film).
- Acquired an unfinished 1940 Cornel Wilde film, added new sequences, and released it as the feature Stairway for a Star. (1947)
- Distributed many race films but only produced one, Louis Jordan's Beware! (1946).
- Obtained the rights to many of Sam Katzman's Monogram Pictures East Side Kids features for re-release at the same time Monogram was releasing its Bowery Boys films.
- Distributed Sunset Carson's post Republic Pictures Westerns.
- Distributed many of the early Hammer Films in the US by an arrangement with Hammer's parent company Exclusive Films.
- Released many low-budget science fiction films, such as Cat-Women of the Moon and its later remake, Missile to the Moon, during the 1950s.

== Subsidiaries ==
- Started a subsidiary, Atlantic Television, to distribute films to television in the late 1940s.
- Operated a subsidiary, Comedy House, which released cut-down versions of Bing Crosby and other Educational Pictures comedy shorts for 16mm home viewing use.

== Art House releases ==
After Savini's death, Astor and Atlantic Television were acquired by George F. Foley, Jr. and Franklin Bruder, who released European films in the US. It is probably here the Astor name is best remembered, for in three years they brought several cinematic classics to theaters in the early 1960s. Astor's biggest success was undoubtedly Federico Fellini's La Dolce Vita (1960), which was a huge box-office hit for the company, and allowed it to continue to release foreign films such as Michael Powell's Peeping Tom (1960), François Truffaut's Shoot the Piano Player (1960), Alain Resnais' Last Year at Marienbad (1961), and Orson Welles' The Trial (1962). However, despite its success with such important films, Astor went bankrupt in 1963.
