= Tom Howard (comedian) =

American comedian

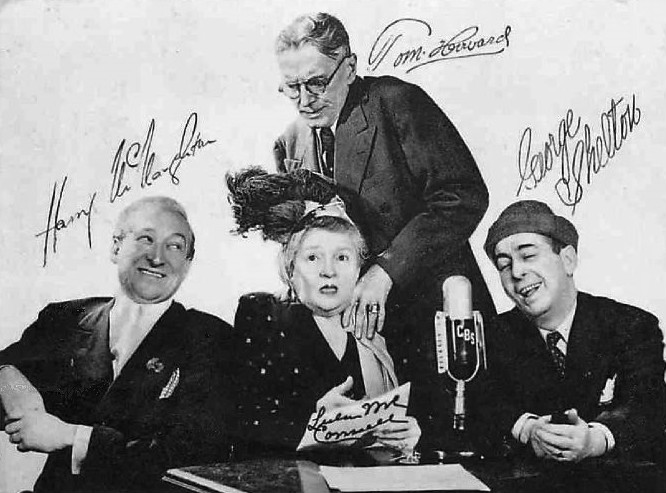
- Tom Howard (standing) and the rest of the cast of It Pays to Be Ignorant: (left to right) Harry McNaughton, Lulu McConnell and George Shelton
- Born: 16 June 1885; Ireland
- Died: 27 February 1955; New Jersey, US
- Other names: Thomas Black Jr.
- Occupation(s): comedian, actor
- Notable work: It Pays To Be Ignorant

Thomas Black Jr. (June 16, 1885 – February 27, 1955), known professionally as Tom Howard, was an Irish-born American comedian in burlesque, vaudeville, radio, film, television and Broadway plays. He co-wrote and starred in the radio comedy show It Pays to Be Ignorant.

He was born to Mr. and Mrs. Thomas Black in County Tyrone, Ireland. The family emigrated to the United States when he was 11 months old.

In 1905, he embarked on his show business career, taking the stage name Tom Howard. After decades of working in medicine shows, burlesque, vaudeville and a few Broadway plays, he made his breakthrough in two Broadway musicals, Rain or Shine (1928) and Flo Ziegfeld's Smiles (1930), the latter at a salary of $1100 a week. He appeared in two feature films, Rain or Shine (1930, repeating his stage role) and Get That Venus (1933).

Howard became better known in movie short subjects, filmed in New York by Paramount and then Educational. Many of these featured Howard's longtime burlesque and vaudeville partner George Shelton (1885–1971).

Howard owned, co-wrote, and starred in the radio comedy show It Pays to Be Ignorant, which aired from 1942 to 1951, first on the Mutual Broadcasting System, then CBS, and finally NBC. And pay it did: a July 1949 Royal Bank of Canada Monthly Letter stated his salary was a staggering $219,000. Purporting to be a quiz show, the program had Howard posing ridiculous questions ("What color is a red stoplight?"), to which his panel of "experts"—Harry McNaughton, Lulu McConnell, and George Shelton—supplied dull-witted responses ("Where is this stoplight located?"). Howard's daughter Ruth wrote many of the show's jokes and scripts. The same cast brought the show to television, where it was broadcast as a summer-replacement series on CBS from June 6 to September 19, 1949, and on NBC from July 5 to September 27, 1951. Howard signed off every show with "Good night and good nonsense!"

Howard died of a "heart ailment" at the age of 69 in Long Branch, New Jersey.

== Filmography ==
All shorts, with the exception of Rain or Shine and Get That Venus.
May be incomplete.
Sourced from Howard's IMDb filmography, unless otherwise specified.

- Hold Up (1929)
- The Spy (1929)
- Rain or Shine (1930)
- One Good Urn Deserves Another (1930)
- The African Dodger (1931)
- Two A.M. (1931)
- The Rookie (1932)
- Breaking Even (1932)
- Acid Test (1932)
- Aces Wild (1933)
- Static (1933)
- Get That Venus (1933)
- The Big Meow (1934)
- The Wrong Bottle (1934)
- Second Hand Husband (1934)
- Easy Money (1935)
- An Ear for Music (1935)
- Grooms in Gloom (1935)
- Time Out (1935)
- The Magic Word (1935)
- Stylist Stouts (1935)
- He's a Prince (1935)
- Where Is Wall Street (1936)
- Rail Birds (1936)

== Broadway plays ==
- The Greenwich Village Follies (September 20, 1923 – January 1924)
- Dixie to Broadway (October 29, 1924 – January 1925)
- The Greenwich Village Follies (December 24, 1925 – May 29, 1926)
- Rain or Shine (February 9 – December 15, 1928)
- Smiles (November 18, 1930 – January 10, 1931)
- The Gang's All Here (February 18 – March 9, 1931)
- Keep Moving (August 23 – September 8, 1934)
