= Robert M. Savini =

American film producer

- Born: Robert Madison Florett Savini; August 29, 1886; New Orleans, Louisiana
- Died: April 29, 1956 (aged 69); New York City
- Occupations: Film producer and distributor
- Years active: 1933–1956

Robert Madison Florett Savini (August 29, 1886 – April 29, 1956) was an American film distributor and producer who founded Astor Pictures.

== Biography ==
Savini was born in New Orleans, Louisiana. He entered the American motion picture world by becoming a theatre usher in August, 1904. He worked his way up to being a theatre owner, and became a film distributor.

In 1932 he became an assistant to William Saal of Sono Art-World Wide Pictures. Saal and Savini teamed up the following year to form Amnity Pictures in May 1933 until Savini formed his Astor Pictures in October 1933. The film distribution company was named for the Hotel Astor in New York City where Savini was then residing. Savini claimed that World Wide Pictures changed its name to Atlantic Pictures in late 1935 and he would continue as its sales manager.

For over two decades Astor acquired screening rights for various previously released films to be released as double features at neighborhood theaters. Sometimes Astor would "streamline" the older films by editing them to fit as part of a double feature and often gave them new and more exciting titles. He also provided films in 16 mm to small cinemas and clubs for screening as well as for home use.

Astor distributed many race films and organised a Broadway premiere for Oscar Micheaux's The Betrayal (1948).

Savini's Atlantic Pictures became Atlantic Television in 1950 which sold screening rights to several of their films for television showing. With the supply of older feature films for re-release drying up, Savini acquired film screening rights for many British and foreign language films and produced several new science fiction films such as Cat Women of the Moon.

== Bibliography ==
- Pitts, Michael R. Astor Pictures: A Filmography and History of the Reissue King, 1933-1965 McFarland, 12 Apr 2019
