= Eugene Von Grona =

German dancer and choreographer

Eugene Von Grona (January 23, 1908 – March 29, 2000) was a German professional dancer and choreographer. He was born in Berlin as Eugen Pressner. As a child he visited the United States quite frequently, where he became enamored with the cakewalk and minstrel shows. By the 1920s, after completing his studies under Mary Wigman, von Grona finally made his move to the United States with his wife Leni Bouvier (born Leni Cohen, Bonn, November 15, 1905; died Berlin, January 2, 1994). Both dancers, they were fascinated by the new artistic innovations of the Harlem Renaissance. He enjoyed the sounds of Duke Ellington and other ragtime favorites. In 1930, Von Grona arranged the dance, "Mechanical Ballet," for the Broadway musical, Fine and Dandy. Brooks Atkinson of the New York Times said, "the most stunning dance number is a mechanical ballet, which is quite the most vivid of its kind."

It was in 1934 that von Grona and his wife (billed as Leni Bouvier) appeared as themselves in a film short for Vitaphone, whose studios were located in Brooklyn, New York. The film starred Lillian Roth and was released April 7, 1934 as Story Conference (1934). "Since von Grona's career was focused on the stage and recital hall, it is fortunate that this film exists of him and his wife."

In 1935, he began dancing and directing ballets at the Roxy Theatre.

== Major contributions ==
Quickly he was confronted with racial boundaries, as many American theaters were segregated by law or custom. Performing opportunities were extremely limited to black dancers, and many ballet studios would not accept black students. He decided that the dancers at Roxy were too light and stated, "I want them black, black, all Negro." Not long after, Von Grona established a Negro Ballet company. The first Negro ballet company was Helmsley Winfield's New Negro Art Theatre Dance Group. They debuted on March 6, 1931 and continued to perform until just after Winfield's death January 15, 1934.

Von Grona wanted to blend the ballet technique with Harlem. He began by advertising in newspapers and even offering scholarships to prospective dancers. His all-black company was composed of 20 dancers. The company debuted on November 21, 1937, at the Lafayette Theatre in Harlem. The dances, including The Firebird, were accompanied by an all-black member symphony, and included musical selections by W. C. Handy, Ellington, and Stravinsky. Under Von Grona's direction his dancers, regardless of race, were finally presented as true artists.

Although the company's premiere was a critical moment for the future of dance in America, its success wasn't sustainable. The American Negro Ballet Company survived for barely a year and ended in 1938. Thanks to Von Grona's artistic motivation many other choreographers followed in his footsteps by bringing black Americans to the stage. Just a few years later, the First Negro Classic Ballet premiered in Los Angeles, and by 1954 the New York Negro Ballet was already touring internationally.

== Major works ==
Firebird, one of Eugene Von Grona's most famous works, was performed in 1937 at the Lafayette Theater in Harlem by the First American Negro Ballet. The work was a ballet composed of two scenes, lasting for 45 minutes.
