= Rain or Shine =

Rain or Shine may refer to:

== Drama, television, and film ==
- Rain or Shine (film), a 1930 film directed by Frank Capra
- Rain or Shine (musical), a 1928 Broadway musical
- Rain or Shine (TV series), a 2017 South Korean TV series

== Music ==
- Rain or Shine (Dick Haymes album)
- Rain or Shine (Houston Person album)
- Rain or Shine (O.A.R. album)
- Rain or Shine (Paul Carrack album)
- "Rain or Shine" (song), a 1986 song by Five Star

== Other ==
- Rain or Shine Elasto Painters, a team in the Philippine Basketball Association

== See also ==
- "Come Rain or Come Shine", a 1946 popular song
- Rain, Hail or Shine, a 1998 album by The Battlefield Band
- Reign & Shine, a 2005 album by the Mahotella Queens
- Raynor Scheine (born 1942), American actor
