= Thelma Hill (dancer) =

African-American ballerina and ballet teacher

Thelma "Mother" Hill (1924–1977) was an African-American dancer and dance educator from Brooklyn, New York. A groundbreaking artist considering the limited opportunities for black dancers at the time, Hill would co-found the New York Negro Ballet Company and teach dance at the university level before her accidental death in 1977.

== Biography ==
Hill was born on May 26, 1924. Hill's first dance education was in tap. Later, she would study ballet at the Metropolitan Opera School of Ballet. In 1954, Hill and Ward Flemyng founded the New York Negro Ballet Company. The Negro Ballet Company was one of the first all-black ballet companies of its kind. The company would join with California's First Negro Classic Ballet company to conduct several tours of Europe throughout the late 1950s. The ballet companies disbanded after the death of their patron.

Hill performed as a dancer in the first television broadcast of Revelations on the March 4, 1962 program Lamp Unto My Feet. The choreography, inspired by gospel music and slavery in the deep south would have a landmark resonance. Revelations would become one of the most significant American concert dances of all time, and would be performed continuously by the Alvin Ailey American Dance Theater for the next sixty years.

In the 1960s, Hill began teaching dance after an injury cut her performance career short. She would teach dance at City College and Lehman College of City University of New York.

Hill died on November 21, 1977, at age 53 from smoke inhalation from a fire in her Brooklyn apartment.

Hill is honored as the namesake of the Thelma Hill Performing Arts Center, a Brooklyn, New York non-profit organization dedicated to supporting Black performers and providing community access to dance. The Arts Center was founded in 1976 and later renamed after her.

== See also ==
- List of dancers
