= Jack Cameron (actor) =

American actor, singer, and acrobatic comedian (1883-1956)

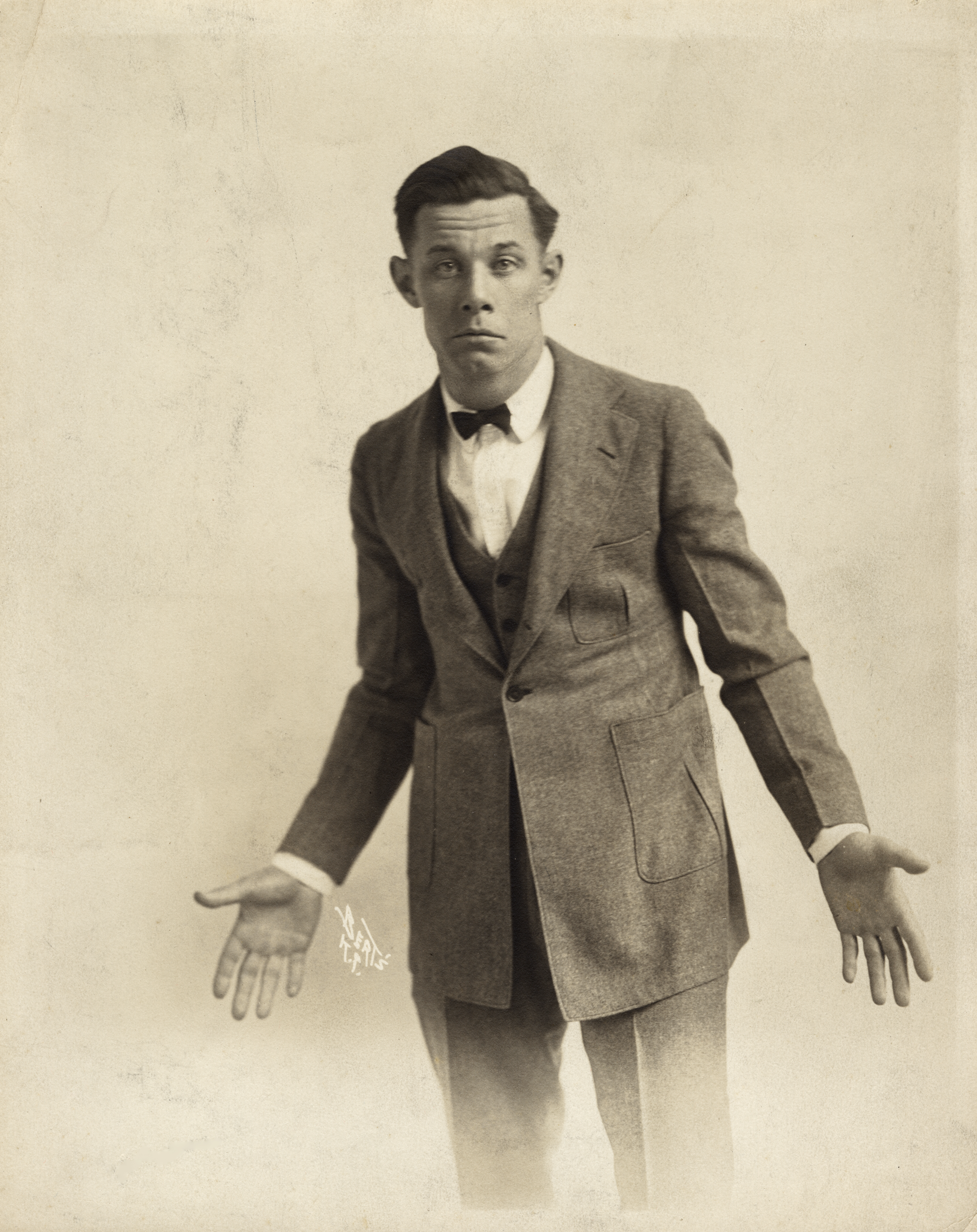
- Publicity photo by Bert's K.C. 1920
- Born: Jacques Kammerer; November 2, 1883; Troyes, France
- Died: September 25, 1956 (aged 72); Taunton, Massachusetts, U.S.
- Other name: Jack Kammerer
- Occupations: Actor; acrobat; comedian; singer
- Years active: 1903–1947
- Spouses: Clara Higgs (m. 1904; div. 1911) Edna Howland (div. 1923)
- Children: 4

Jack Cameron (born Jacques Kammerer; November 2, 1883 – September 25, 1956), also known as Jack Kammerer, was an American actor, singer, and acrobatic comedian whose career spanned almost five decades. He appeared in vaudeville, burlesque, film, radio, and television. Cameron was best known for his vaudeville performances, first as part of the Kammerer & Howland musical comedy act, and later as a principal comedian on the Keith-Albee circuit. He appeared in several motion pictures and could be heard on WPRO (AM) radio as the “Singing Salesman.”

== Early life and career ==
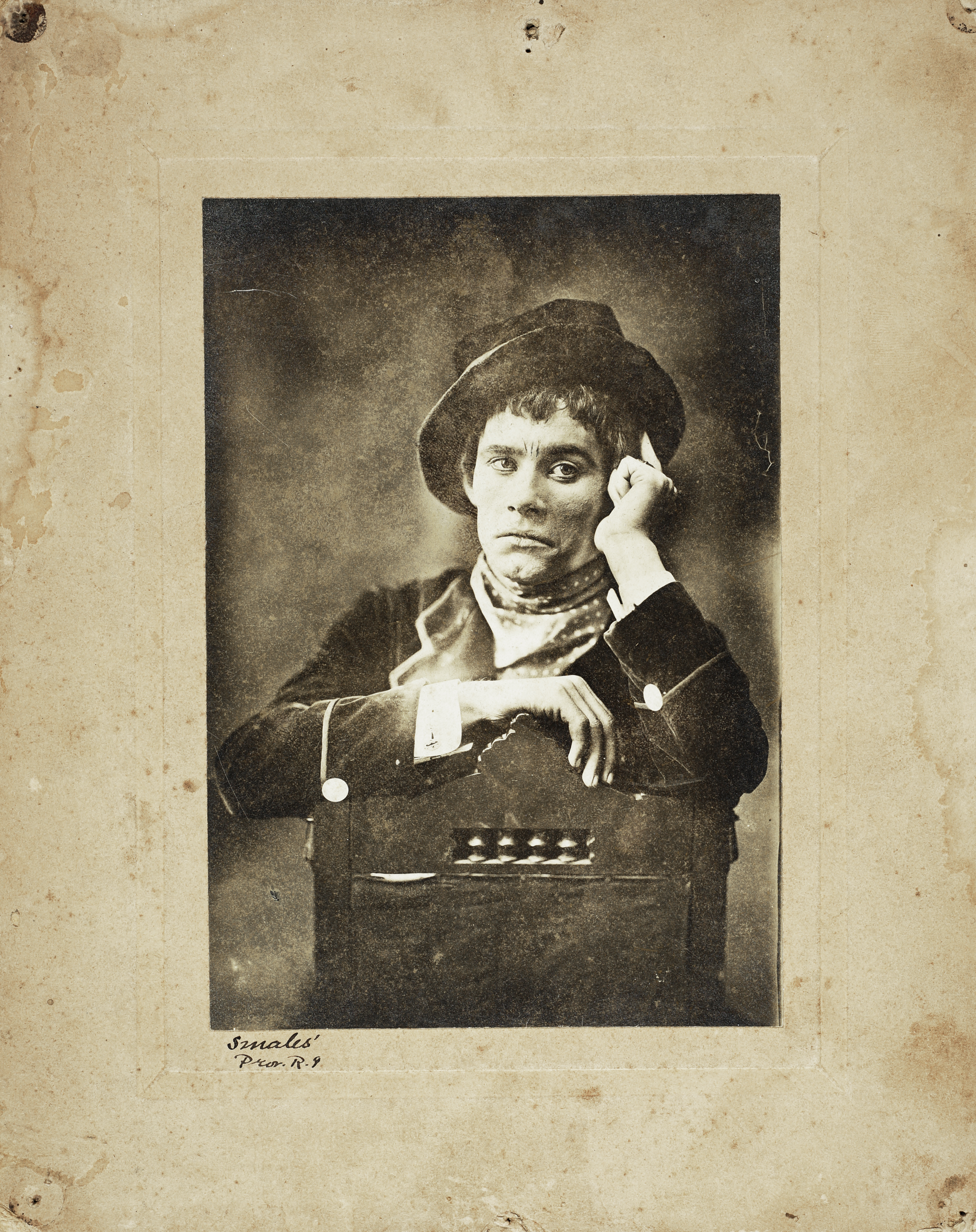
Early publicity photograph taken by Smales Studio in Providence, RI. Circa 1910.

Kammerer was born as Jacques Kammerer on November 2, 1883, in Troyes, France. In 1897, he immigrated to Providence, Rhode Island with his father, Joseph Kammerer, and grandmother, Victorine Kammerer. As a teenager, Kammerer worked in a hat factory and trained as a gymnast at the Providence Boys’ Club. He began performing as an acrobat at Rocky Point Amusement Park's Forest Casino in 1903. He appeared in local minstrel shows and with The Newman Comedy Four. In 1904, Kammerer married Clara Montgomery Higgs. They had three children and divorced in 1911. After the divorce, the children lived with Kammerer’s grandmother, Victorine, and uncle on a dairy farm in Rehoboth, Massachusetts.

== Kammerer & Howland ==
Kammerer entered Providence vaudeville as a performer of illustrated songs. In 1910, Kammerer and Edna Howland, a classically trained pianist, began appearing together at the Bijou theatre as “Kammerer & Howland -- Classical Comedy Singing and Talking Act”. The Bijou was specifically designed as a venue for illustrated songs, which were performed between films, and an act like Kammerer & Howland would offer an upward of nine song programs per day at six days per week. The duo joined Fred Homan's Musical Stock Company at the Scenic Temple on Matthewson Street in 1911. Homan's company also included Eddie Dowling. Though it disbanded after only two years, the company was remembered fondly by Rhode Island theatregoers.

Kammerer & Howland appeared on Marcus Loew’s national circuit for the first time in 1913. They toured North America on the Loew’s circuit for four years, and were known for comedic songs, clever banter, acrobatic dancing, and for Kammerer’s impersonations of Ford Sterling, Charlie Chaplin, and Bert Williams. Kammerer & Howland were billed alongside celebrated entertainers, such as Will Rogers and Marie Stoddard. In 1914, Kammerer joined the White Rats of America, a labor union organized by theatre employees in an effort to destabilize the Vaudeville Managers Association.

Toward the end of the decade, Kammerer & Howland appeared together in American burlesque. They married and had one child, Donald L. Kammerer, born in Missouri during Kammerer and Howland’s tour with the 1919-1920 season of Pat White’s Gaiety Girls. The cast included Joe Yule and Nell Carter, who welcomed their only child, Mickey Rooney, while on the same tour.

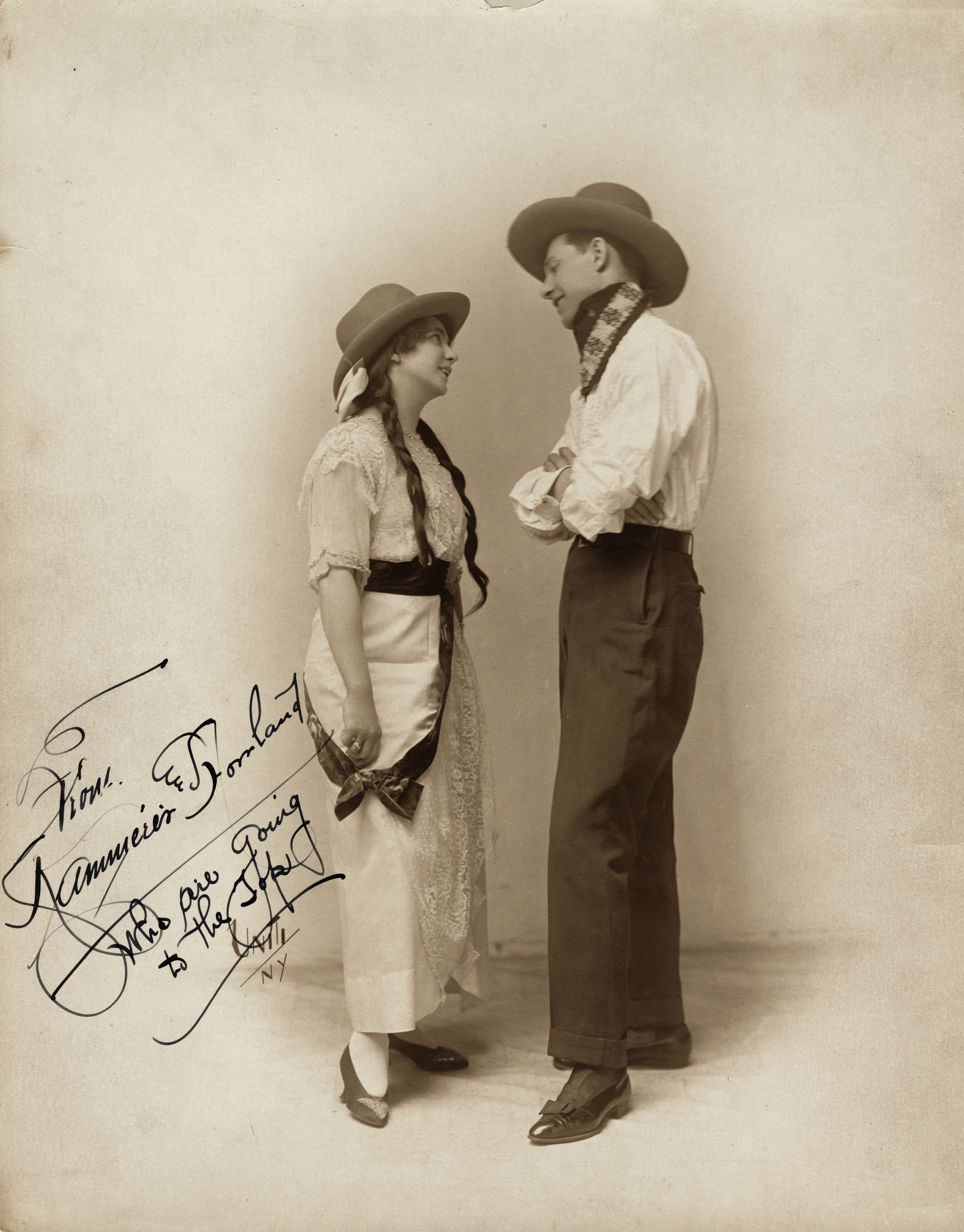
1915 publicity photo signed: "From Kammerer & Howland, Who are going to the top."

The Gaiety Girls’ tour was the last for the duo of Kammerer & Howland. Howland returned to Providence, RI, with their son shortly after his birth. In 1923, she sued Kammerer for divorce on grounds of neglect and extreme cruelty. Howland was awarded custody, as well as a provision of ten dollars per week.

== Jack Cameron ==
In 1921, Kammerer adopted the stage name Jack Cameron. Around this time, he was offered a string of lead roles in New York City burlesques. He appeared in Sliding Billy Watson's World of Frolics, Eddie Dowling's Hello Miss Radio, and Fred Clark's Let’s Go. In 1923, Cameron was cast as a principal in Charles Waldron’s Bostonians. The show earned mixed reviews, but Cameron was a stand out. Alfred Nelson, theatre critic for Billboard, referred to Cameron as “a singer, dancer, and versatile actor of remarkable ability.” Variety noted that the audience "couldn't get enough" of Cameron's baritone. Bostonians also marked the first artistic collaboration between Cameron and the youthful singer, Leo Lee.

After Bostonians, Cameron was cast as the principal comedian in vaudeville producer Charles B. Maddock's Tramp, Tramp, Tramp: A Song of the Road, book by Ballard MacDonald. Tramp paired Cameron once again with Leo Lee, along with six supporting male performers. The men played singing hobos, thrown together by fate in a camp beside a railroad track. The show was a hit and toured nationally on the Keith-Albee Circuit between 1925 and 1927. Cameron followed Tramp, Tramp, Tramp with lead roles in three other C.B. Maddock productions: Sidekicks (1927-1929), Style Shop (1930), and All Wet (1931).

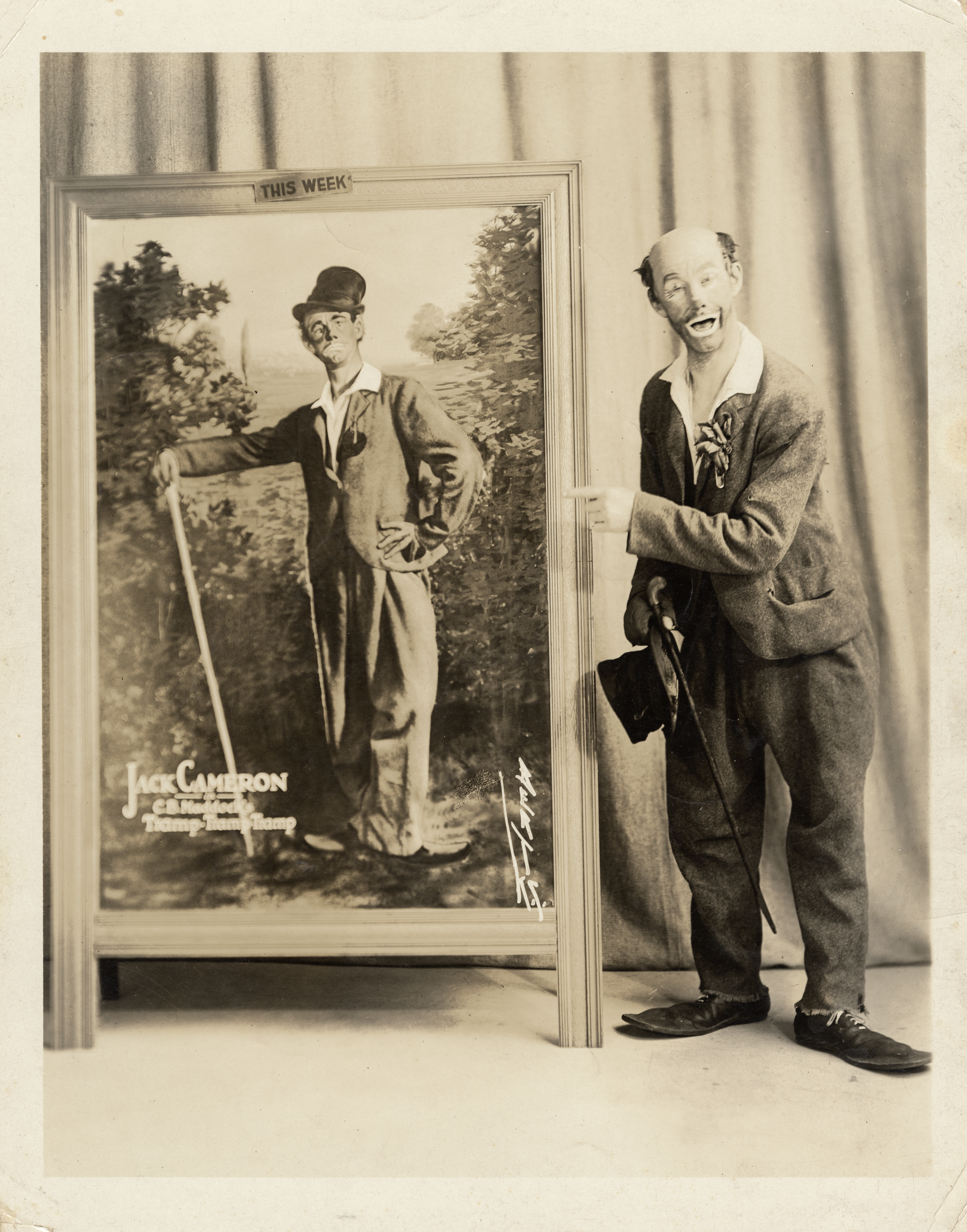
Cameron in Tramp, Tramp, Tramp. 1925.

In 1929, Cameron starred alongside Helen Morgan in the Rouben Mamoulian motion picture, Applause. Cameron's character was true to life: he played an aging burlesque clown by the name of “Joe King.” During the opening scenes of Applause, Cameron's comedic and acrobatic abilities are on full display, with shots of Cameron clowning-around and backflipping across the sound stage. Joe King disappears from the story after making an unsuccessful offer of marriage to Kitty Darling, played by Helen Morgan. Cameron appeared in two subsequent motion pictures: The Spy (1929) with Tom Howard, directed by Monte Brice, and Little Lord Fauntleroy (1936) with Mickey Rooney, directed by John Cromwell.

== Later years ==
Cameron continued to work as an entertainer throughout the 1930s and 1940s. He performed in the role of Gonzorgo in Babes in Toyland for two seasons, 1930 and 1931, with the Aborn Opera Company and Singer's Midgets, at the Imperial Theatre on Broadway.

In 1934, he reunited with Leo Lee, from Tramp and Sidekicks, to star in a new show, Broadway to Withersville. It was a flop.

Toward the end of the 1930s, Cameron launched his “drunk” nightclub act, There Is a Tavern in the Town, at the Old Fashioned Cafe in Boston. He could be heard on WPRO (AM) radio as the “Singing Salesman” and appeared on the WBZ television show, You’re On. Cameron retired from show business in 1947.

He died in Rehoboth, Massachusetts on September 25, 1956.
