= Edna Howland =

American actress (1886–1964)

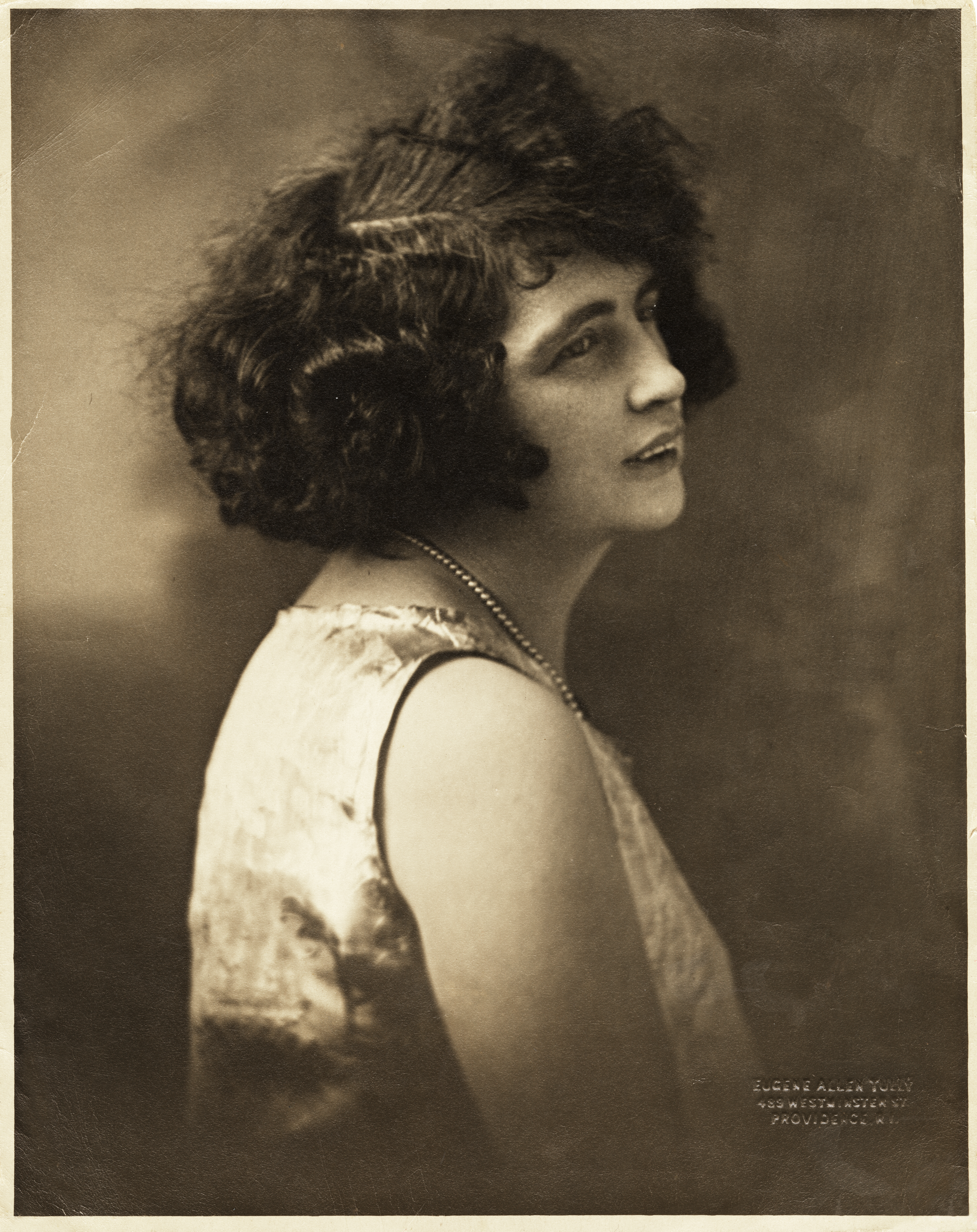
- 1920s photo by Tully's, Providence, RI
- Born: Sadie Edna Howland; September 22, 1886; Somerset, Massachusetts, U.S.
- Died: October 14, 1964 (aged 78); Providence, Rhode Island, U.S.
- Occupations: Pianist, vaudeville artist
- Years active: 1902–1921
- Spouses: Jack Kammerer (div. 1923); Bertil Lindstrom (m. 1929; div. 193?)
- Children: 1

Edna Howland (born Sadie Edna Howland; September 22, 1886 – October 14, 1964) was an American vaudeville artist. She was best known for her piano playing and soprano voice. Between 1910 and 1920, she toured with Jack Kammerer, an acrobatic comedian. Billed as Kammerer & Howland, the duo described themselves as a "Classical Comedy Singing and Talking Act", and as performers of "Jollity and Jingles Mirthfully Mingled". She retired from show business in the early 1920s.

== Early life and career ==
Edna Howland was born Sadie Edna Howland on September 22, 1886, to Benjamin L. Howland and Mary (Murray) Howland, in Somerset, Massachusetts. Her father, Benjamin L. Howland, served in the American Civil War. He spent eight months as a prisoner of war after the Second Battle of the Weldon Railroad.

The Howland family moved to Providence, Rhode Island between 1891 and 1896. Howland's first documented piano solo was at a church social given by the Junior Society of the Stewart Street Baptist Church.

In 1902, Howland began taking piano lessons from Mr. and Mrs. Ernst Fischer. The Fischers were educated at the University of Music and Theatre Leipzig, founded by Felix Mendelssohn. They instructed in singing, piano, harmony, and composition from their studio in the Conrad Building on Westminster Street.

During her years as a pupil of the Fischers, Howland frequently performed classical piano music for public audiences. She was featured in numerous public recitals hosted by the Fischers. In 1907, Howland headlined a benefit for the Women's Christian Temperance Union at Frances Willard Hall on Snow Street. A year later she joined Providence Mayor Patrick J. McCarthy to entertain members of the Rhode Island Pharmaceutical Association at their annual conference.

== Kammerer & Howland ==
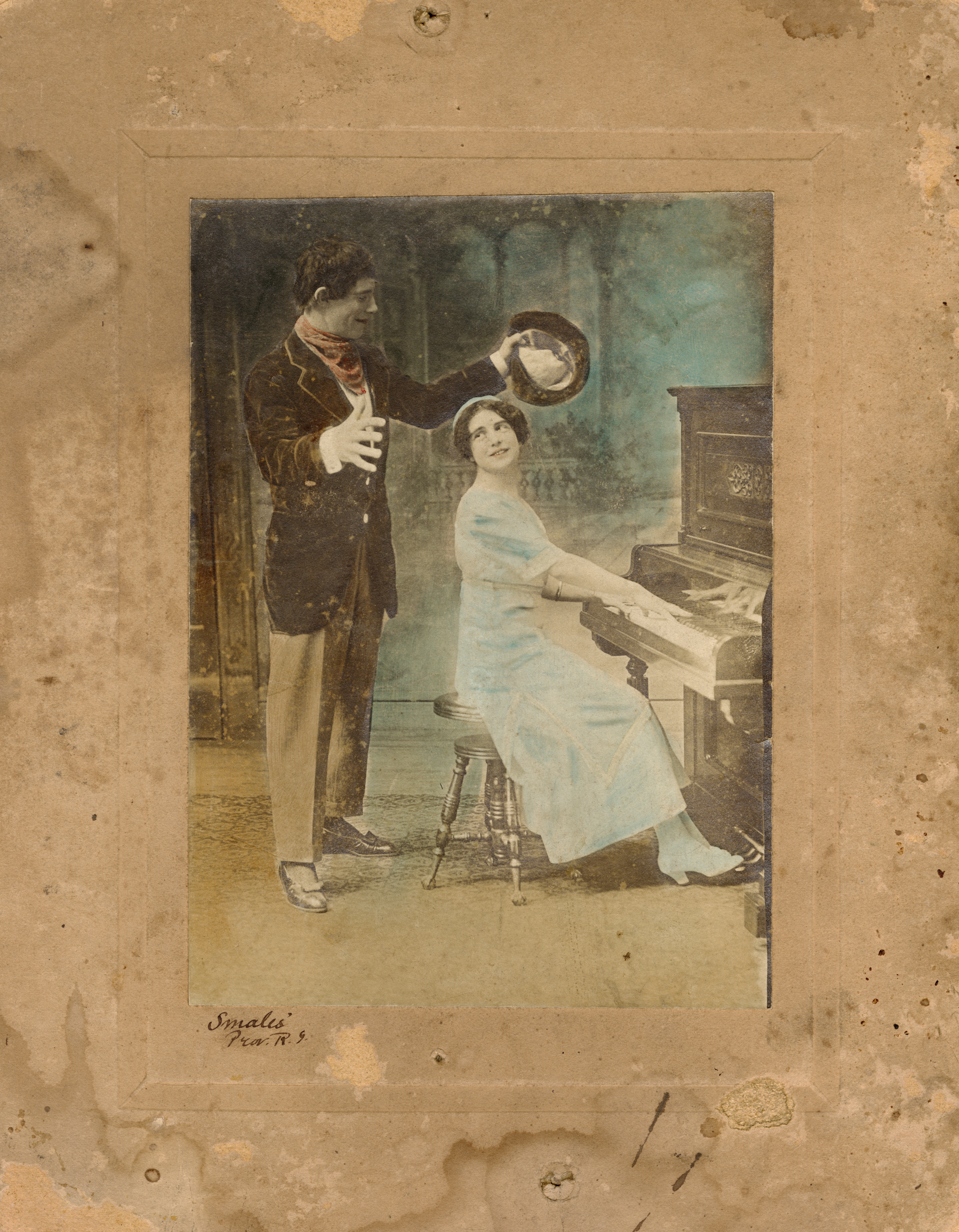
Early Kammerer & Howland publicity photo by Smales Studio, Providence, RI

In June 1909, Howland began making weekly appearances as a performer of illustrated songs at the Bijou theatre, one of Providence's many vaudeville houses. The Bijou was specifically designed as a venue for illustrated songs, which were performed between films, and a pianist like Howland would play nine programs per day at six days per week. Howland soon formed an act with local comedian, Jack Kammerer (later known as Jack Cameron), which they described as “Kammerer & Howland -- A Classical Comedy Singing and Talking Act”. In 1911, the two joined Fred Homan's Musical Stock Company at the Scenic Temple on Matthewson Street. Eddie Dowling was also an actor in Homan's company. The company dissolved after two years, but not without leaving a lasting impression on Rhode Island theatregoers.

In 1913, Kammerer & Howland started touring North American on Marcus Loew’s vaudeville circuit. They were known for comedic songs, clever banter, acrobatic dancing, and for Kammerer’s impersonations of Ford Sterling, Charlie Chaplin, and Bert Williams. Kammerer & Howland shared bills with major vaudeville names, such as Will Rogers and Marie Stoddard. When Kammerer joined the White Rats of America, a labor union organized by theatre employees in an effort to destabilize the Vaudeville Managers Association, Howland did not as women were not permitted to join.

In 1918, Kammerer & Howland entered American burlesque when they were cast in Max Spiegel’s Social Follies. Billboard’s burlesque critic wrote: “Edna Howland as an ingenue appears to good advantage by interspersing some real comedy into her actions, singing and dancing, all of which she does well.” While on tour with Pat White's Gaiety Girls, Howland gave birth to her only child, Donald L. Kammerer, born on May 28, 1920, in St. Louis, Missouri. The Gaiety Girls cast included Joe Yule and Nell Carter, who welcomed their only child, Joe Jr., later known as Mickey Rooney, four months later while on the same tour.

After the birth of their son, Kammerer & Howland ended their professional and romantic relationship. Howland returned to Providence, Rhode Island with their son and proceeded to sue Kammerer for divorce on grounds of neglect and extreme cruelty. In 1923, she was awarded custody of Donald, as well as a provision of ten dollars per week.

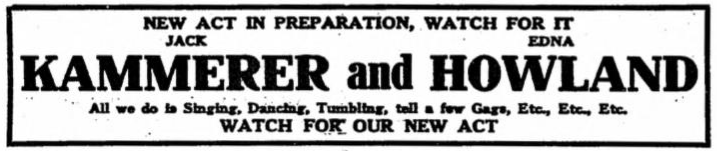
Kammerer and Howland advertise a new act in The New York Clipper. September 5, 1917.

== Later years ==
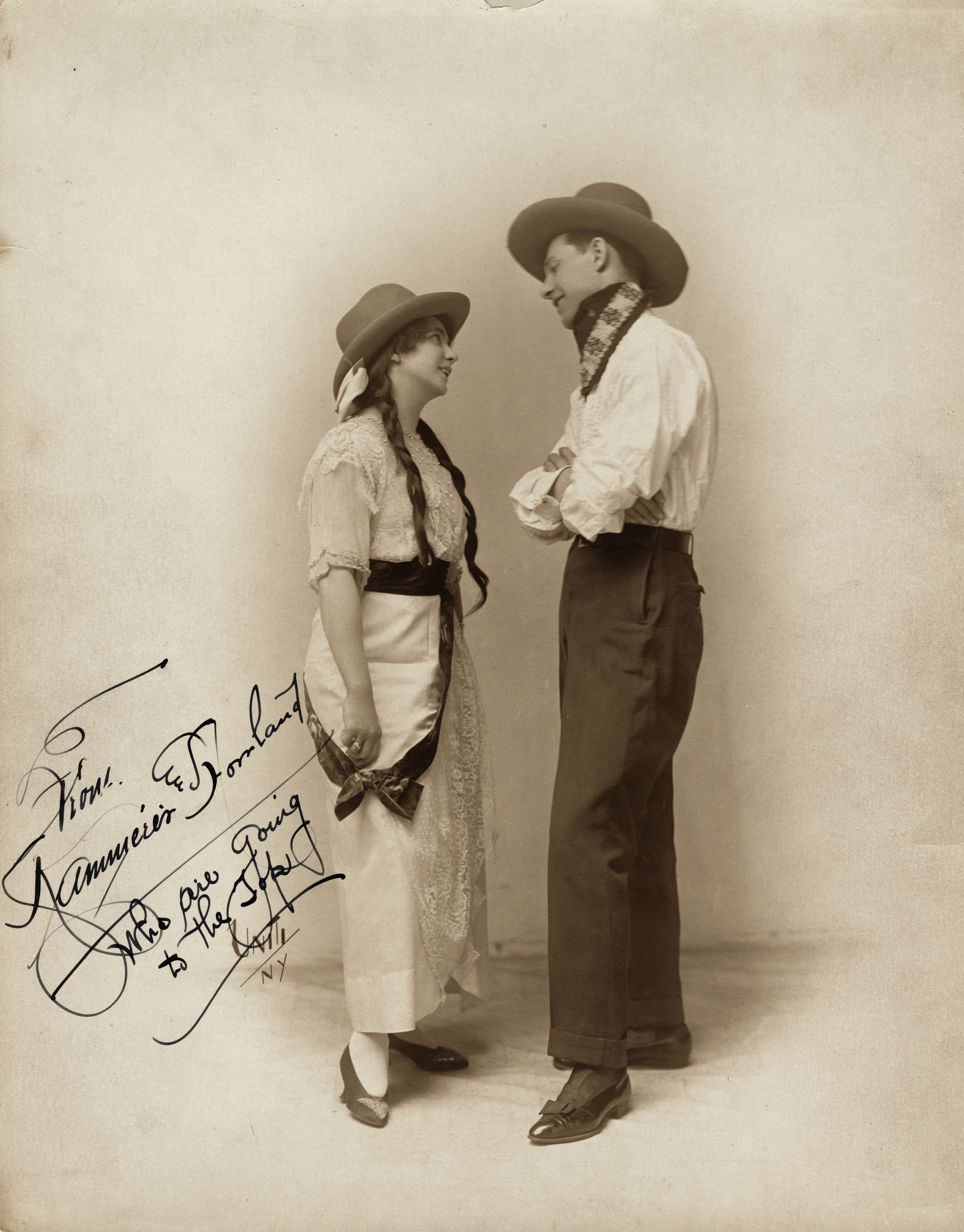
1914 Unity Studio NY photo signed, "From Kammerer & Howland, Who are going to the top."

In 1929, Howland married Bertil William Lindstrom. They married in New York City and lived in New Jersey. By 1935, they were divorced and Howland had returned to Providence. She rented an apartment on Friendship Street, where she lived with her son, Donald, and worked as a housekeeper. Howland and her son performed music locally as part of an ensemble organized by Mrs. Eli E. Wilcox. Howland died on October 14, 1964, aged 78.
