= Joe Cook (actor) =

American vaudeville performer (1890–1959)

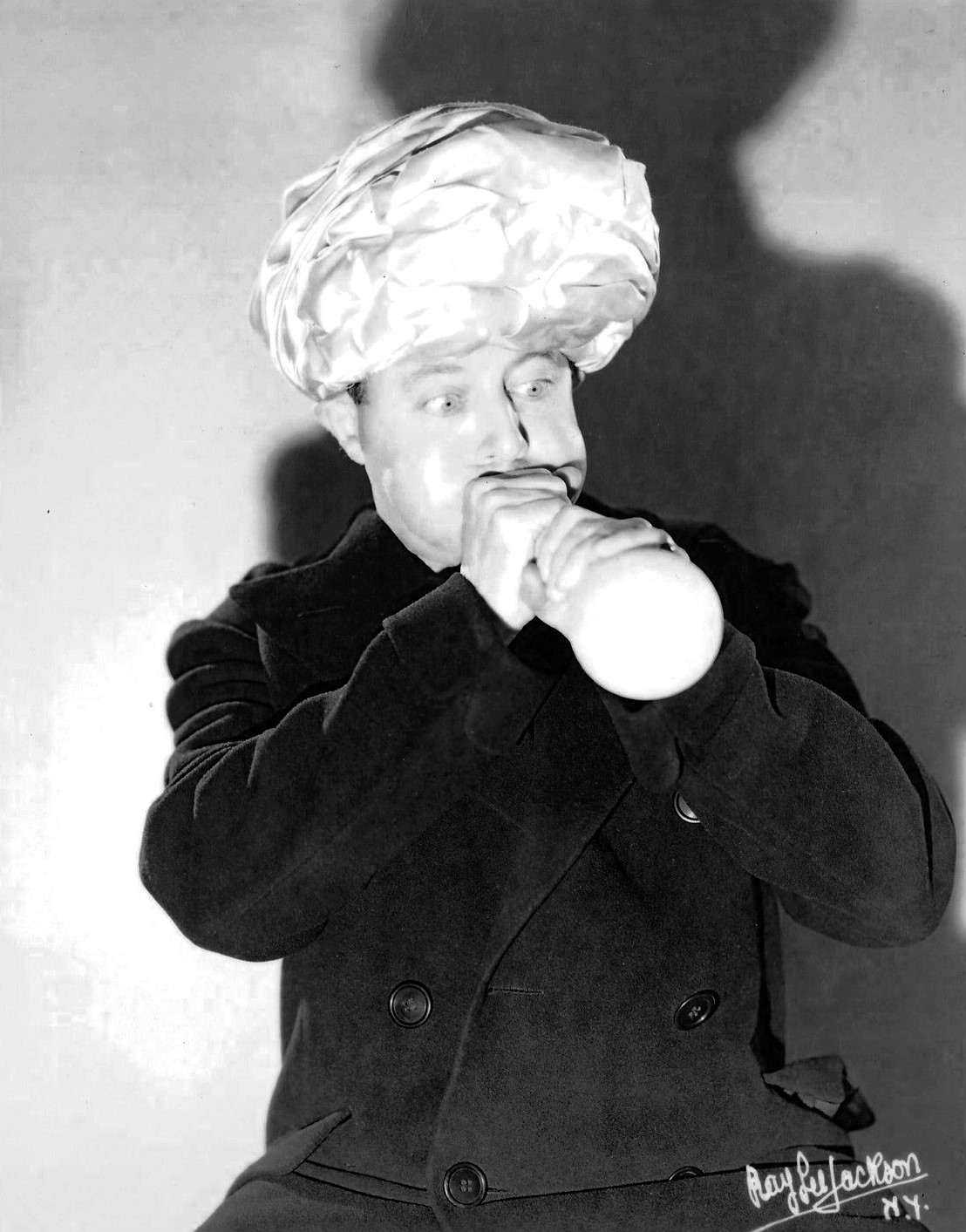
- Cook in 1936
- Born: Joseph Lopez; March 29, 1890; Evansville, Indiana, U.S.
- Died: May 15, 1959 (aged 69); Bull Head, Dutchess County, New York
- Occupations: Vaudevillian, comedian, actor
- Spouse: Helen Reynolds

Joe Cook (born Joseph Lopez; March 29, 1890 – May 15, 1959) was an American vaudeville performer whose career peaked in the 1920s and 1930s. Cook headlined at New York's Palace Theatre. After appearing on Broadway, he broke into radio.

== Early life ==
Joseph Lopez was born in Evansville, Indiana, in 1890. At age three, he and his six-year-old brother Leo were orphaned, when their father died rescuing a drowning boy and their mother died two months later. The brothers were adopted by a distant relative, Mrs. Anna Cook. They lived in the back of their grocery store at the corner of Fourth and Oak in Evansville.

== Career ==
Cook joined a circus in 1906, which propelled him to vaudeville, Broadway, and Hollywood. He and his brother Leo were billed as "Joe Cook and Brother". They were in vaudeville together from about 1909 to 1916.

Joe mastered many skills of the circus. As a magazine columnist reported: "Engagements in small-time vaudeville, amusement parks, and tent shows followed rapidly. He never had a layoff. And he emerged as one of the biggest one-man shows on the vaudeville stage. Everyone yielded to the breathless spell of his very human antics. He could quietly, unsmilingly go through an incredible act of wire-walking, juggling, fiddling, or master yarn-spinning and bring down the house."

He combined his nonsensical comedy storytelling, complex inventions to perform absurdly simple or useless tasks, and playing piano, violin, and ukulele. The broad variety of his act led to his nickname – "One Man Vaudeville". New York Times critic Brooks Atkinson once wrote, "Next to Leonardo da Vinci, Joe Cook is the most versatile man known to recorded times." In 1930, noted columnist Walter Winchell wrote that "Joe Cook is certainly one of the musical theatre's three geniuses. I can't at the moment think of the other two."

Joe Cook had enjoyed a very successful career in vaudeville (with three years in blackface) when his brother Leo died. Cook was desolate, and withdrew from show business and his professional friends and colleagues. He remained at his lakeside home in New Jersey with his wife, the former Helen Reynolds, and children. Showman Earl Carroll coaxed him out of retirement with a generous offer to star on Broadway in the Earl Carroll Vanities of 1923.

Cook often teamed with stooge and future restaurateur Dave Chasen, in such shows as Rain or Shine, Fine and Dandy—the first hit completely scored by a woman (Kay Swift)—and Hold Your Horses. Corey Ford, the co-author of the last-named musical, wrote: "When I first saw Joe Cook in 1923, he was co-starring in Earl Carroll's Vanities with Peggy Hopkins Joyce, whom he used to refer to as 'that somewhat different virgin making her professional debut'. I sat on the balcony and marveled at the bland deadpan expression, the slightly curved mouth, the easy flow of nonsense patter as he walked a tightrope or juggled Indian clubs while explaining to the audience why he would not imitate four Hawaiians." Cook's "Four Hawaiians" routine was his most famous; Joe explained that he was actually imitating only two Hawaiians. He "could imitate four Hawaiians but did not wish to do so because that would put all the performers who could only imitate two Hawaiians out of work". Cook appeared on stage with a ukulele in hand:

I will give an imitation of four Hawaiians. This is one [whistles]; this is another [plays ukulele], and this is the third [marks time with his foot]. I could imitate four Hawaiians just as easily, but I will tell you the reason why I don't do it. You see, I bought a horse for $50 and it turned out to be a running horse. I was offered $15,000 for him, and I took it. I built a house for the $15,000, and when it was finished, a neighbor offered me $100,000 for it. He said my house stood right where he wanted to dig a well. So I took the $100,000 to accommodate him. I invested $100,000 on peanuts, and that year, there was a peanut famine, so I sold the peanuts for $350,000. Now, why should a man with $350,000 bother to imitate four Hawaiians?"

In the 1930s, Cook successfully transitioned into radio, as the host of two variety series and a frequent guest on many others.

== Films ==
Joe Cook made only two full-length movies and five short subjects. In 1930 Columbia Pictures hired him to star in the film version of Rain or Shine, which also featured Dave Chasen from the stage show, and was directed by a young Frank Capra.

In 1935, Earle W. Hammons of Educational Pictures needed a "name" comedian for that season's short-subject program and signed Cook, who starred in five two-reel comedies (and wrote the scripts for three) at Educational's New York studio. The first release, Mr. Widget, set the tone for the series; Cook adopted the name "Joe Widget" for his cheerfully silly character.

Cook's only other feature film, Arizona Mahoney (1936), is a western based on a Zane Grey story; the supporting cast included a young Larry "Buster" Crabbe.

== Personal life ==
From 1924 to 1941, he made his residence at Lake Hopatcong in New Jersey, which was then a popular resort. His house was named "Sleepless Hollow" for the many parties he gave and celebrities he entertained. One visitor, his librettist Donald Ogden Stewart, recalled in 1975 that "Joe lived on a mad gag-infested estate in New Jersey which bewilderingly expressed his genius. On his three-hole golf course one drove off confidently into what looked like a fairway only to have one's ball rebound sharply over one's head from a huge rock that had been cunningly camouflaged. The last green was a golfer's paradise in that no matter where the ball landed it rolled obediently into the hole. Conditions inside the house were similarly deranged. The 'butler' was one of the contortionists, acrobats, midgets, or other show-business people whom Joe had picked up his years in vaudeville. Mrs. Cook lived bravely in this cuckooland and struggled apologetically to bring some degree of common sense into the madhouse."

A 1935 report, however, refutes the calculated craziness of the Cook domicile: "When Earl Carroll motored out to Lake Hopatcong, where Joe lives, he expected to talk into a telephone that squirted water in his face. He anticipated being made uncomfortable by any number of weird inventions and goofy contraptions, of which he had heard so much gossip. But when he yanked at the bell-pull of the paneled front door, a friendly porch light winked on above his head, and his friend led him into the serenity of a quiet house, where a huge log burned hospitably in an open grate."

"The Cookhouse" at Lake Hopatcong is not open to the public.

== Final years ==
Cook was diagnosed with Parkinson's disease in 1941, forcing him to retire from show business. He sold the lake house that year and moved to a more modest residence in New York State, where he resided until his death in 1959.
