= Theodore Hancock =

American artist

Theodore R. Hancock
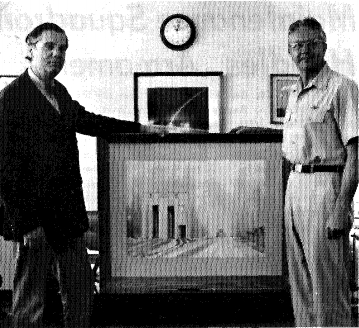
- Hancock (left) presents a watercolor of the 'Titan Integrate – Transfer – Launch Complex' at Cape Kennedy to Maj. Gen. David M. Jones, Air Force Eastern Test Range commander, circa February 1970. The picture was added to the Air Force Space Museum collection.
- Born: November 16, 1923
- Died: July 28, 1989 (aged 65)
- Other name: Theo
- Occupation: Artist

Theodore ("Theo") R. Hancock (November 16, 1923 – July 28, 1989) was a British-born, naturalised American artist, working chiefly in watercolor.

== Early life ==
Hancock was born in Buckinghamshire, England to a military father and was educated at Sutton Valence school in the Kent Downs. After finishing school in 1942, Hancock saw war service with the British Army as a gunner subaltern in Greece and Italy. He attended Pembroke College, Cambridge in 1944 and in 1948 took up a Fellowship in Art to Brown University in Rhode Island, New York.

== Career ==
Described by Time magazine as a 'brash, engaging young Briton', he exhibited widely throughout North America during his time at Brown University and thereafter, including in Boston, Manhattan, Providence, Chicago, Toronto, San Francisco and Los Angeles. He remained resident in the United States, painting in a former Methodist chapel in New Hamburg, New York. Hancock mainly worked in watercolour and his art was both modernist and distinguished by a strong interest in engineering and technology. He concentrated on urban landscapes, trying to capture what he called the 'visual language that technology uses to create the city environment'. His mural, Man and Computers, explores the close relationship linking man and the then-new machine, with a 'web-like intimacy' between the two.

He was an official artist to NASA and its Apollo space programme in the 1960s as part of the NASA Art Program. He later undertook commissions for the United States Navy, including journeys at sea on Polaris nuclear submarines. Hancock also held the position of Cadet Fine Arts Forum Visiting Artist at the United States Military Academy for the 1979–80 academic year, during which he produced watercolours of West Point scenery.

His work can be found in the Smithsonian American Art Museum, the National Air and Space Museum in Washington, D.C., the United States Navy Art Collection, the Air Force Space & Missile Museum, the High Museum of Art in Atlanta, Agnes Scott College in Georgia and the University of Texas at Galveston among others. Another piece was owned by British Prime Minister Winston Churchill.

Hancock was also known in the 1950s for having organised and supported the Harlem-based New York Negro Ballet troupe, who were invited to take part in the Monte Carlo Festival of Ballet in December 1957.
