= All Quiet on the Western Front (1930 film) =

1930 American film by Lewis Milestone

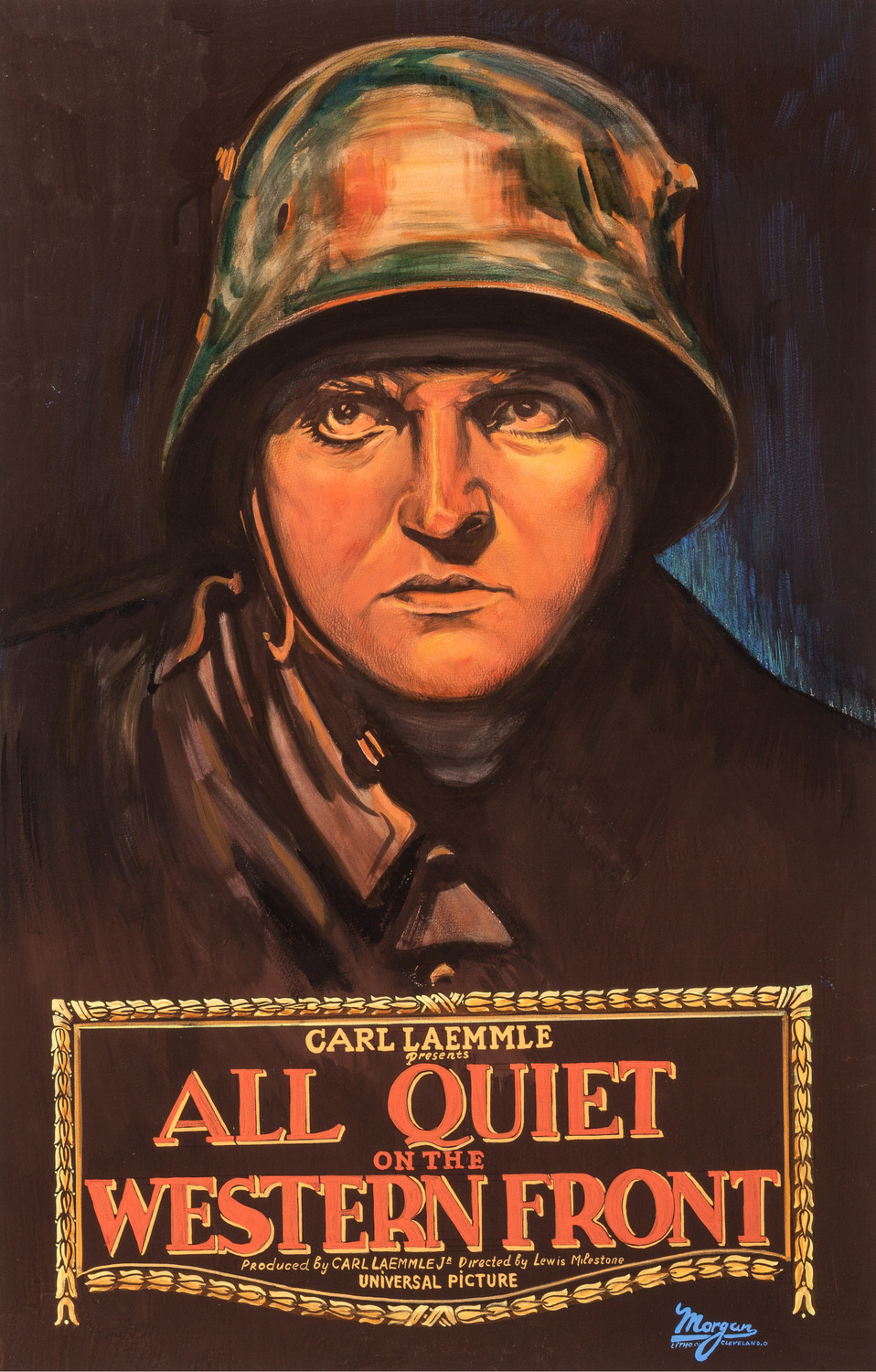
- Theatrical release poster by Karoly Grosz
- Directed by: Lewis Milestone
- Written by: Maxwell Anderson (adaptation & dialogue); George Abbott (screenplay); Del Andrews (adaptation); C. Gardner Sullivan (supervising story chief)
- Based on: All Quiet on the Western Front by Erich Maria Remarque
- Produced by: Carl Laemmle Jr.
- Starring: Lew Ayres; Louis Wolheim
- Cinematography: Arthur Edeson
- Edited by: Edgar Adams; Maurice Pivar; Milton Carruth (International Sound Version)
- Music by: David Broekman
- Production company: Universal Studios
- Distributed by: Universal Pictures
- Release dates: 21 April 1930 (Los Angeles); 24 August 1930 (United States)
- Running time: 152 minutes 133 minutes (restored)
- Country: United States
- Language: English
- Budget: $1.2 million
- Box office: $3 million (worldwide rentals)

All Quiet on the Western Front is a 1930 American pre-Code epic anti-war film based on the 1929 novel of the same name by German novelist Erich Maria Remarque. Directed by Lewis Milestone, it stars Lew Ayres, Louis Wolheim, John Wray, Slim Summerville, and William Bakewell.

The film opened to wide acclaim in the United States. Considered a realistic and harrowing account of warfare in World War I, it made the American Film Institute's first 100 Years...100 Movies list in 1997. A decade later, after the same organization polled over 1,501 workers in the creative community, All Quiet on the Western Front was ranked the seventh-best American epic film.

In 1990, it was selected and preserved by the United States Library of Congress' National Film Registry, being deemed "culturally, historically, or aesthetically significant". The film was the first to win the Academy Awards for both Outstanding Production and Best Director, and it is the first Best Picture-winner based on a finished novel. As a film published in 1930, it entered the public domain on January 1, 2026, following expiry of the copyright on the novel in 2024.

A sequel to the film, The Road Back (1937), portrays troops from 2nd Company returning home after the end of World War I.

== Plot ==
All Quiet on the Western Front (1930)

In a German village during the early stages of The Great War, Professor Kantorek gives an impassioned speech to his students about the glory of defending their country. The boys, led by Paul Bäumer, enthusiastically enlist in the Imperial German Army and are cruelly trained by Sergeant Himmelstoss, formerly a friendly mailman now corrupted by his authority.

The new soldiers arrive in a destroyed town on the Western Front and assigned to the 2nd Company, where they are mentored by Corporal "Kat" Katzinsky about the harsh realities of the war. Paul and his friends are first tasked with re-rigging the barbed wire on the frontline; Behn is blinded by an artillery strike and then killed by gunfire. The unit is eventually rotated to a frontline trench, where Paul and his squad shelter in a dugout and endure several days of heavy bombardment and starvation. The terror and stress overwhelms many of the men, and Kemmerick is severely wounded when he flees the dugout in panic. The company then repels a massive attack by the French Army; Paul and his squad barely survive.

When the company is finally relieved and fed proper rations, the men ponder on what caused the war and the petty justifications for the fighting. Paul and his friends then go to visit Kemmerick in the hospital, who eventually dies. More of Paul's friends and schoolmates are killed or wounded as time passes, shattering his innocence and any romantic notions about the war.

Himmelstoss arrives at the front and forced to go on an attack with the 2nd Company; he is quickly killed after showing himself to be a coward. During the battle, Paul stabs a French soldier and becomes increasingly distraught as he spends the night trapped alone in a shell-hole with the dying man. He begs for forgiveness when the man dies before sneaking back to safety.

Behind the lines, Paul and his good friend Albert Kropp are severely wounded by artillery fire and then sent to a Catholic hospital. Paul makes an unexpected recovery, but Albert has both his legs amputated. Paul visits his family at home on furlough, confounded at how uninformed and optimistic everyone is towards the war. Visiting Kantorek's classroom, he's asked to share his experiences and when he expresses his disillusionment, the students call him a coward.

Paul cuts his furlough short and returns to the 2nd Company, now filled with replacements even younger than his class had been. Tjaden, one of the few surviving veterans, tells Paul the fates of several of their comrades. Paul greets Kat as he returns from foraging and discuss the grim outlook of the war. Kat is then wounded by an aerial bomb; Paul carries him and barely avoids a second bomb before reaching a field hospital, where he discovers Kat had already been killed.

Back at the front, a despondent Paul sees a butterfly just outside the trench. He reaches overtop the sandbagged parapet to grab it and is killed by a sniper. The film ends with Paul and his classmates looking back at the camera as they march away, superimposed over the image of a military cemetery.

== Cast ==
- Louis Wolheim as Corporal Stanislaus "Kat" Katczinsky, an older soldier who was a cobbler
- Lew Ayres as Paul Bäumer, a student and writer, who is the leader of the boys
- John Wray as Himmelstoss, a mailman who becomes the boys' drill sergeant
- Arnold Lucy as Professor Kantorek, who encourages the boys to enlist
- Ben Alexander as Franz Kemmerick, a boy who is blown up, has his leg amputated, and dies
- Scott Kolk as Leer, a boy whose ultimate fate is not shown
- Owen Davis Jr. as Peter, a boy who is shot in the head and killed after getting Kemmerick's boots from Mueller
- Walter Browne Rogers as Behn, a boy who is blinded and then shot and killed in no man's land
- William Bakewell as Albert Kropp, a boy who is hit by shrapnel and has his leg amputated at the same time Paul is injured and hospitalized
- Russell Gleason as Mueller, a boy who is injured by shrapnel shortly after getting Kemmerick's boots
- Richard Alexander as Haie Westhus, an older soldier who was a peat-digger, who Paul is told died trying to save a messenger dog
- Harold Goodwin as Detering, an older soldier who was a farmer with a cherry orchard
- Slim Summerville as Tjaden, an older soldier who makes it to the end
- G. Pat Collins as Lieutenant Bertinck, an officer in Paul's company
- Beryl Mercer as Frau Bäumer, Paul's mother
- Edmund Breese as Herr Meyer, a friend of Paul's father

=== Uncredited ===
- William Irving as Ginger, an army cook
- Raymond Griffith as Gérald (or Gérard) Duval, a French soldier who Paul stabs and then watches die for hours while trapped in a shell-hole
- Yola d'Avril as Suzanne, the French woman who sleeps with Paul
- Poupée Andriot as the blonde French woman, who sleeps with Leer
- Renée Damonde as the brunette French woman, who sleeps with Albert
- Heinie Conklin as Joseph Hammacher, a soldier with a head injury who Paul and Albert meet in the Catholic hospital
- Bertha Mann as Sister Libertine, a nurse at the Catholic hospital
- Marion Clayton as Erna Bäumer, Paul's sister
- Edwin Maxwell as Herr Bäumer, Paul's father

At the time of his death in December 2014, Arthur Gardner, who appeared uncredited as a student, was the last surviving member of the film's cast or crew.

== Production ==
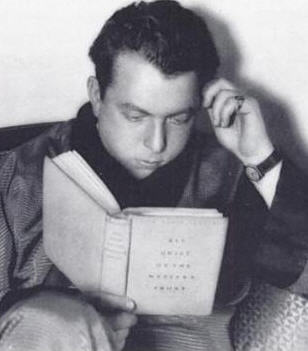
Promotional photo of director Lewis Milestone during the film's production

The film was shot with two cameras side by side, with one negative edited as a sound film and the other edited as an "International Sound Version" for distribution in non-English speaking areas.

A great number of German Army veterans were living in Los Angeles at the time of filming, and many were recruited to work on the film as bit players and technical advisers. Around 2,000 extras were utilized during production. Among them was future director Fred Zinnemann.

In the film, Paul is shot while reaching for a butterfly. This scene is different from the book, in which the manner of Paul's death is not stated, and was inspired by an earlier scene showing a butterfly collection in Paul's home. The scene was shot during the editing of the film, so the actors were no longer available and Milestone had to use his own hand instead of Ayres' hand for the final shot.

Noted comedic actress ZaSu Pitts was originally cast as Paul's mother and completed filming her part, but preview audiences, used to seeing her in comic roles, laughed when she appeared onscreen, so Milestone re-shot her scenes with Beryl Mercer before the film was released. The preview audience remains the only one who saw Pitts in the role, although she does appear for about 30 seconds in the film's original preview trailer.

== Releases ==
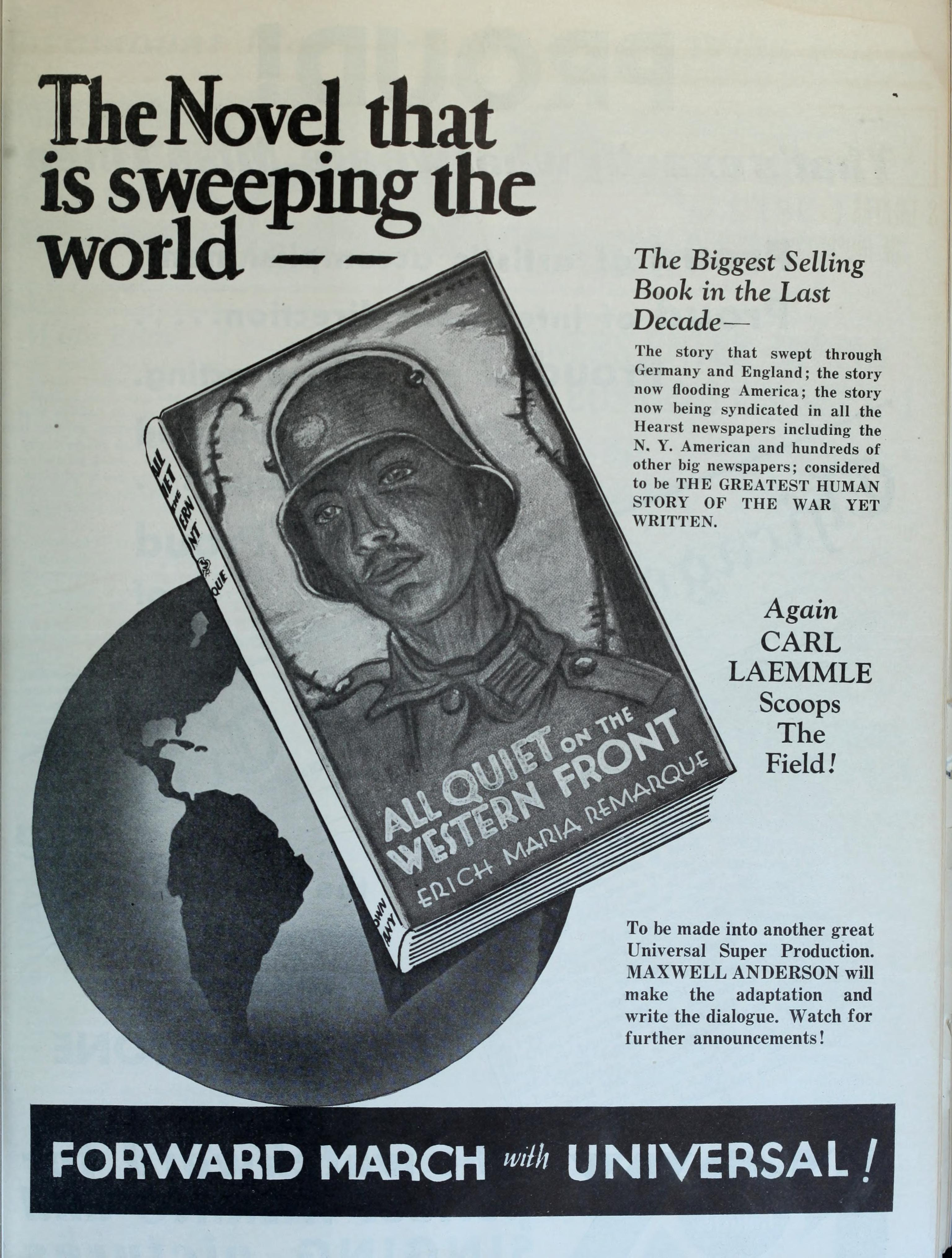
Ad with cover art of the book's first English-language edition in The Film Daily, 1929

The original version of this all-talking picture, lasting 152 minutes, was first previewed in Los Angeles on April 21, 1930, and then in New York on April 25. After re-shooting the scenes with the character of Paul's mother and doing some additional editing, the all-talking version of the film went into general release in the US on August 24, 1930. A 147-minute version was submitted to the British censors, which was cut to 145 minutes before the film premiered in London June 14, 1930. The film was re-released in 1939, though only after being cut down to ten reels. This same version, running 102 minutes, was re-released very successfully by Realart Pictures in 1950, and Universal-International brought it back to theaters in 1958.

Re-release trailer

Re-releases of the film were substantially cut, and the ending was scored with new music against the wishes of director Milestone. Before he died in 1980, Milestone requested that Universal fully restore the film. In 2006, the United States Library of Congress undertook an exhaustive restoration of the film. This version incorporates all known surviving footage and is 133 minutes long.

=== Home media ===
Various edited versions of the film have been distributed on home video, including a Japanese subtitled LaserDisc with a running time of 103 minutes. The US Laserdisc from 1987 and the first US DVD (released in 1999), used the same unrestored 131-minute British release print as their source material. Since 2007, there have been numerous international releases of the 2006 Library of Congress restoration on DVD and Blu-ray. Some releases in the latter format also contain a 133-minute restoration of the International Sound Version, albeit mislabeled as the "silent version".

== Reception ==
=== Critical response ===
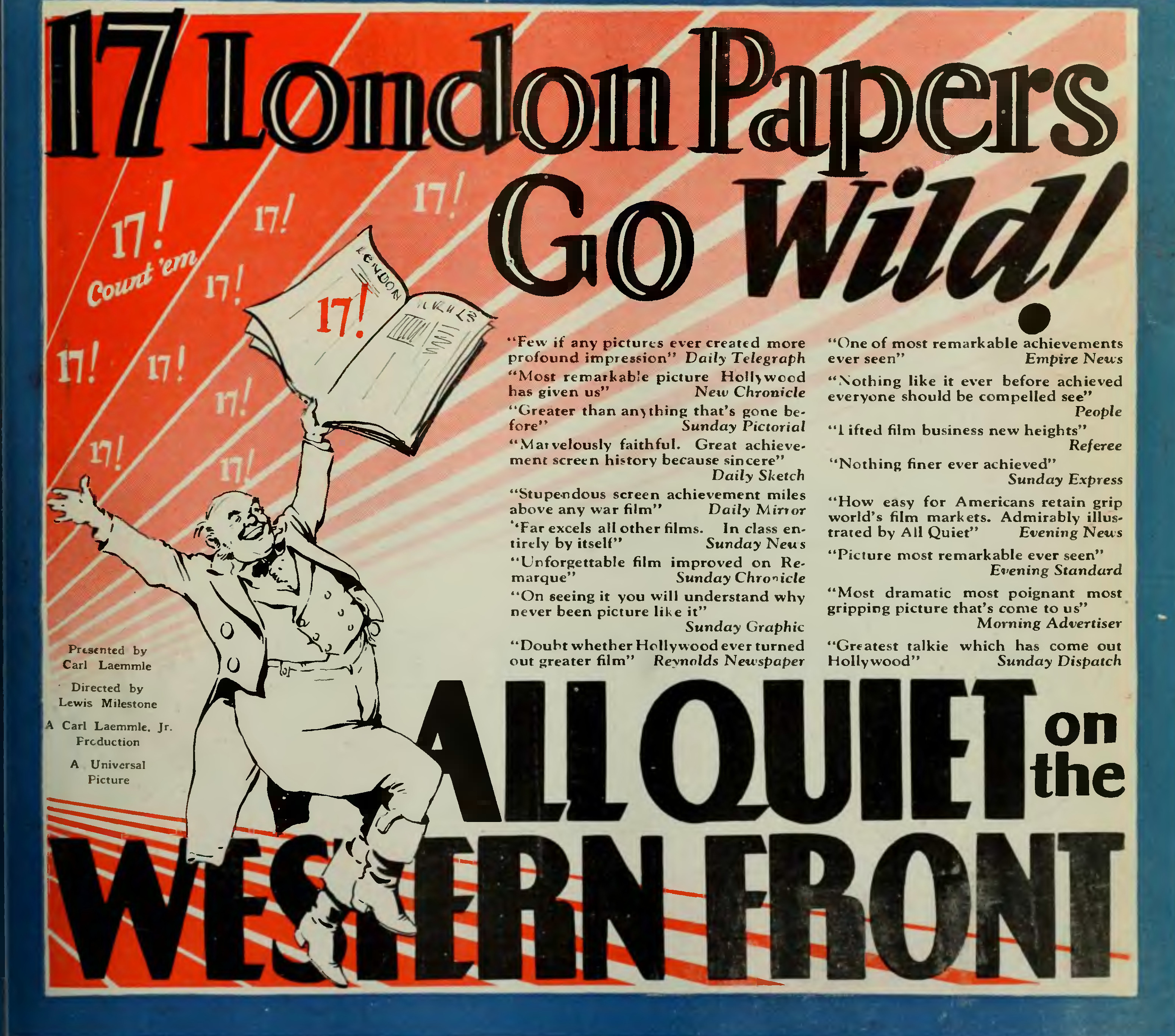
"17 London Papers Go Wild!" All Quiet on the Western Front ad from The Film Daily, 1930

All Quiet on the Western Front received tremendous praise in the United States upon its release. Variety lauded it as a "harrowing, gruesome, morbid tale of war, so compelling in its realism, bigness and repulsiveness", and concluded its review with the statement:

The League of Nations could make no better investment than to buy up the master-print, reproduce it in every language, to be shown in all the nations until the word "war" is taken out of the dictionaries.

In the New York Daily News, Irene Thirer wrote: "It smack[s] of directional genius—nothing short of this; sensitive performances by a marvelous cast and the most remarkable camera work which has been performed on either silent or sound screen, round about the Hollywood studios. [...] We have praise for everyone concerned with this picture." Writing in 1999, author Mike Mayo also ascribed some of the credit for the film's success to Milestone's direction, saying: "Without diluting or denying any [...] criticisms, it should be said that from World War I to Korea, Milestone could put the viewer into the middle of a battlefield, and make the hellish confusion of it seem all too real to the viewer. Steven Spielberg noted as much when he credited Milestone's work as partial inspiration for Saving Private Ryan [...] Lewis Milestone made significant contributions to [the genre of] the war film."

In a retrospective review, American film critic Pauline Kael commented: "The year 1930 was, of course, a good year for pacifism, which always flourishes between wars; Milestone didn't make pacifist films during the Second World War—nor did anybody else working in Hollywood. And wasn't it perhaps easier to make All Quiet just because its heroes were German? War always seems like a tragic waste when told from the point of view of the losers."

On the film review aggregator website Rotten Tomatoes, 98% of 90 critics' reviews of the film are positive, with an average rating of 9.2/10; the site's "critics consensus" reads: "Director Lewis Milestone's brilliant anti-war polemic, headlined by an unforgettable performance from Lew Ayres, lays bare the tragic foolishness at the heart of war." On Metacritic, it has a weighted average score of 91 out of 100 based on reviews from 16 critics, indicating "universal acclaim".

=== Controversy and bannings ===
Despite its acclaim, the film's subject matter also drew controversy. Due to its anti-war and perceived anti-German messages, Adolf Hitler and the Nazi Party opposed the film. During and after its German premiere in Berlin on December 4, 1930, the SA under the command of Joseph Goebbels disrupted screenings by setting off stink bombs, throwing sneezing powder in the air, and releasing white mice in the theaters, eventually escalating to attacking audience members perceived to be Jewish and forcing projectors to shut down. They repeatedly yelled out "Judenfilm!" ("Jewish film!") while doing this.

Goebbels wrote about one such disruption in his personal diary:

Within ten minutes, the cinema resembles a madhouse. The police are powerless. The embittered crowd takes out its anger on the Jews. The first breakthrough in the West. "Jews out!" "Hitler is standing at the gates!" The police sympathize with us. The Jews are small and ugly. The box office outside is under siege. Windowpanes are broken. Thousands of people enjoy the spectacle. The screening is abandoned, as is the next one. We have won. The newspapers are full of our protest. But not even the Berliner Tageblatt dares to call us names. The nation is on our side. In short: victory!

The Nazi campaign against the film was successful, and German authorities outlawed it on December 11, 1930. A heavily cut version was briefly allowed in 1931, before the Nazis came to power in 1933 and the film was banned again. The film was finally re-released in West Germany on April 25, 1952, in the Capitol Theatre in West Berlin.

Between 1930 and 1941, All Quiet on the Western Front was one of many films to be banned in Victoria, Australia, on the grounds of "pacifism" by chief censor Walter Cresswell O'Reilly. However, it was said to enjoy "a long and successful run" in other Australian states, though the book was banned nationally. The film was also banned in Italy and Austria in 1931, with the prohibition officially raised only in the 1980s, and in France until 1963.

== Awards and honors ==
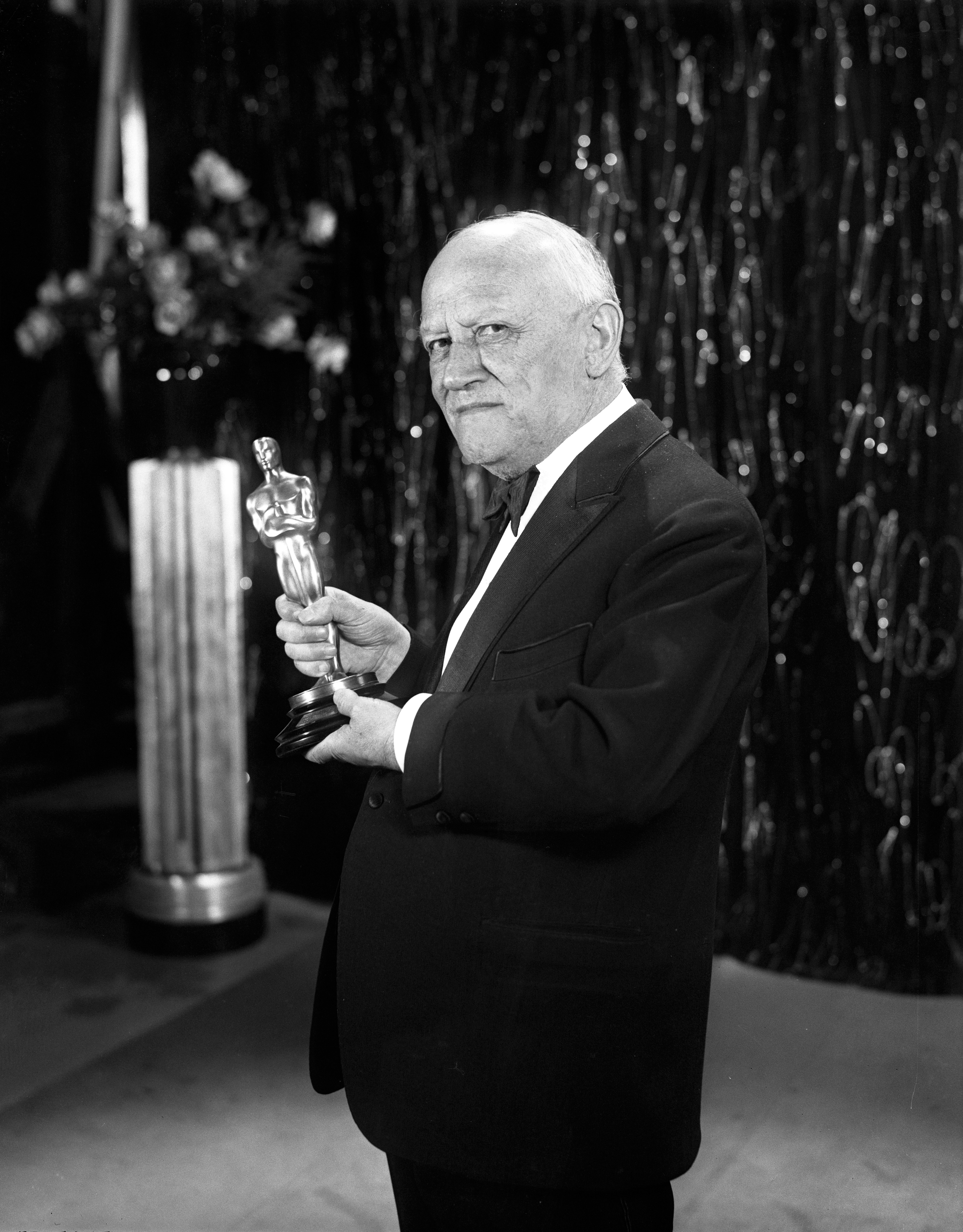
Producer Carl Laemmle holding the Outstanding Production Best Picture Oscar

3rd Academy Awards

Category	Recipient	Result
Outstanding Production	Universal (Carl Laemmle) (Note: The film was produced by Carl Laemmle Jr., but the award was given to his father Carl Laemmle.)	Won
Best Director	Lewis Milestone	Won
Best Writing	George Abbott, Maxwell Anderson and Del Andrews	Nominated
Best Cinematography	Arthur Edeson	Nominated

All Quiet on the Western Front was the first talkie war film to win Oscars.

Other wins

- 1930 – Photoplay Medal of Honor (Carl Laemmle Jr.)
- 1931 – Kinema Junpo Award for Best Foreign Language Film – Sound (Lewis Milestone)
- 1990 – added to the National Film Registry by the United States' Library of Congress

American Film Institute recognition

- 100 Years...100 Movies – #54
- 100 Years...100 Thrills – Nominated
- AFI's 100 Years... 100 Movie Quotes
  - "And our bodies are earth. And our thoughts are clay. And we sleep and eat with death." – Nominated
- 100 Years...100 Movies (10th Anniversary Edition) – Nominated
- AFI's 10 Top 10 – #7 epic film

== See also ==
- All Quiet on the Western Front (1979 film)
- All Quiet on the Western Front (2022 film)
- List of World War I films
