= Joan Peers =

American stage and film actress

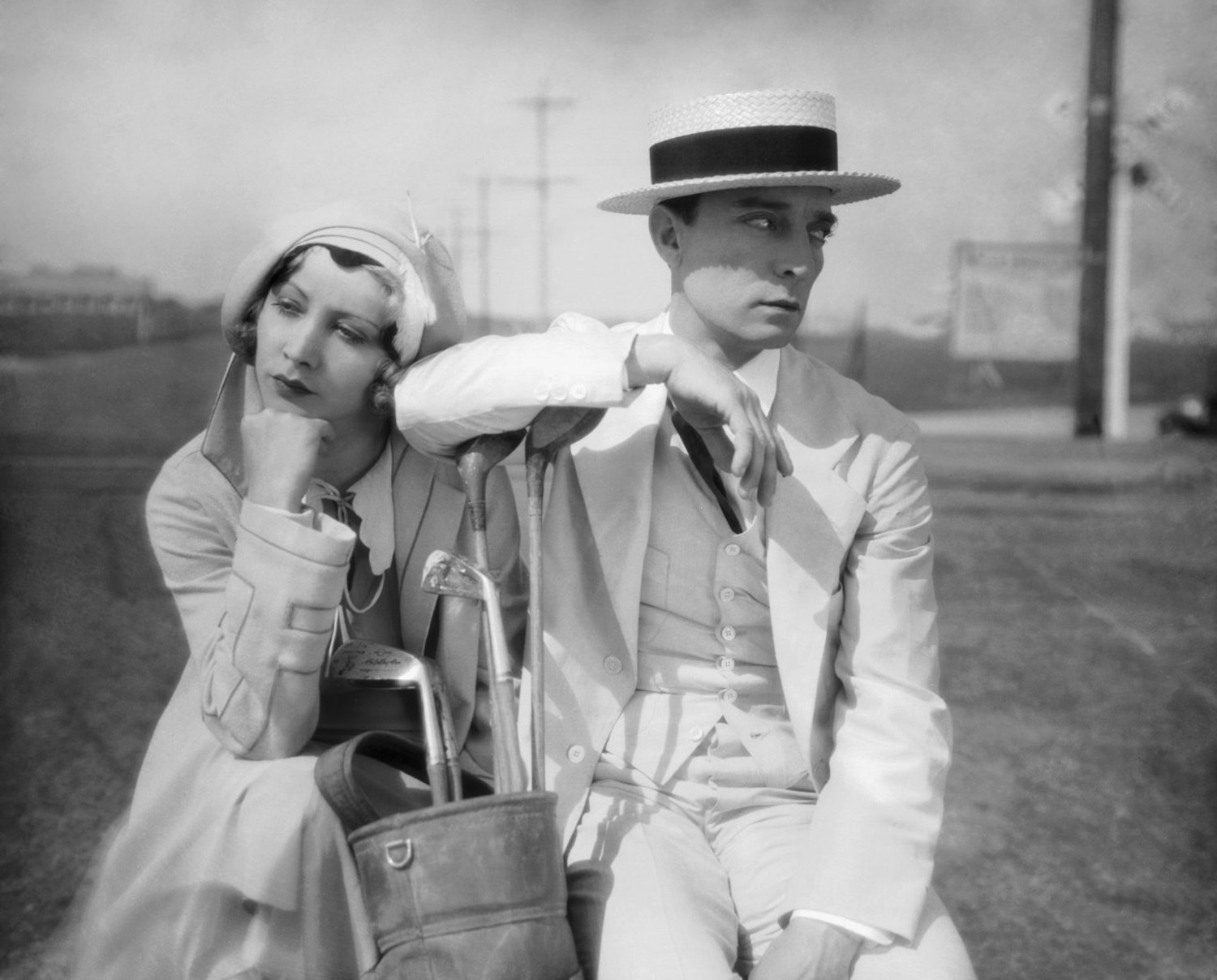
- With Buster Keaton in Parlor, Bedroom and Bath
- Born: August 19, 1909; Chicago, Illinois, U.S.
- Died: July 11, 1975 (aged 65); San Francisco, California, U.S.
- Occupation: Actress
- Years active: 1929-1931

Joan Peers (August 19, 1909 – July 11, 1975) was an American stage and film actress. She enjoyed a brief spell as a Hollywood star, and she is perhaps best known for her role in Rouben Mamoulian's burlesque-set melodrama Applause in 1929.

== Filmography ==
- Applause (1929)
- Rain or Shine (1930)
- Tol'able David (1930)
- Paramount on Parade (1930)
- Around the Corner (1930)
- Anybody's War (1930)
- The Tip-Off (1931)
- Parlor, Bedroom and Bath (1931)
- Over the Hill (1931)

== Bibliography ==
- Hillier, Jim & Pye, Doug. 100 Film Musicals. Palgrave Macmillan, 2011.
- Milne, Tom. Rouben Mamoulian. Indiana University Press, 1970.
