= New York Negro Ballet =

Ballet company in New York, United States

New York Negro Ballet Company

General information
- Name: New York Negro Ballet Company
- Previous names: Ballet Americana
- Year founded: 1954
- Closed: 1959
- Founders: Ward Flemyng, Thelma Hill

The New York Negro Ballet Company, also known as the Ballet Americana, was co-founded in 1954 by American choreographer Ward Flemyng and dancer Thelma Hill. Following in the tradition of the American Negro Ballet Company, which had its first performance in 1937, the New York Negro Ballet Company was one of the first all-black ballet companies in the United States.

== History ==
Initially called Ballet Americana, The New York Negro Ballet Company was a classical ballet troupe.

Edward Flemyng, an African-American choreographer, and dancer Thelma Hill were pivotal in creating Ballet Americana, and in 1954, the duo founded the New York Negro Ballet Company. The company began performing in 1955.

Organizers launched a national six-month search in 1956 to discover talented Black ballet dancers. Philadelphia's Delores Browne joined the company as a principal dancer. Sylvester Campbell, then a young dancer, became a member that year— his first and only position in the U.S.

In 1957, the New York Negro Ballet would partner with California's First Negro Classic Ballet company to conduct a tour of London, Scotland, and Europe. Many of the performers previously worked in Broadway musicals and Hollywood ballet units. Among the other members were Cleo Quitman, Yvonne McDowell, Frances Jiminez, Carol Wise, Patricia Griffith, Candace Caldwell, and Georgia Collins. The average age of the troupe was 22 years old.

British-born artist Theodore Hancock and Edward Flemyng co-directed the new company on its British tour, presented by British impresario Peter Daubeny. The troupe performed work by Joseph Pickard and other first-rate choreographers as well as original works.

Combining classical ballet with traditional African-American dance influences, the 24-dancer company performed with a live orchestra under Edward Clark. Their program included Rhapsody (music by Brahms), Raisin' Cain (set in 1930s New Orleans), Waltze (Lecocq's Mlle Angot), the Bluebird Pas de Deux from Sleeping Beauty, and Mardi Gras, a Carnival ballet group finale.

Their first ever appearance in Britain was held on September 9, 1957, in Glasgow at the King's Theatre. Their tour included stops in Newcastle upon Tyne, Edinburgh, Sheffield, Liverpool, and Leeds. The troupe ended its tour of the British Isles in Wales, first performing on October 21, 1957, at Cardiff's New Theatre.

By November 9, Theodore Hancock returned to New York to arrange American appearances while co-director Ward Flemyng continued in charge of the troupe for the remainder of the tour.

The group arrived in New York on November 20, 1957, after a successful four-month tour of the British Isles.

Strikes across France disrupted theaters, transport, and public services, prompting the company to consider ending its tour. Their PR representative traveled to Europe to evaluate the conditions. The company had planned to begin in Paris on December 2, perform at Monte Carlo's Christmas ballet festival, and continue to Lyons and Marseilles. The ballet company was one of four troupes honored with an invitation to the Monte Carlo Festival of Ballet in December 1957. Due to the ongoing political unrest, their appearances in Paris and Monte Carlo had to be postponed. Originally planned to last into the New Year, the New York Negro Ballet's European tour was cut short, and the troupe returned home in early December.

=== Ballet Americana ===
In June 1958, the company reverted to the name Ballet Americana. Theodore Hancock, vice president of the sponsoring organization, Foundation For American Dance and the Arts, made the announcement via Jack Caldwell, the troupe's public relations director and general manager. Alongside the name change, the company broadened its dancer acceptance policy to allow integration. The troupe began rehearsals for a June 22 New York debut at Kaufmann Auditorium under the YM-YWHA's Dance Center. Featuring choreography by Anthony Basse, Ernest Parham, and Louis Johnson, the troupe performed three ballets from its nine-work repertory during its acclaimed English tour.

After the death of the company's main sponsor, Lucy Thorndike, the New York Negro Ballet disbanded in 1960.

== See also ==
- American Negro Ballet Company
- First Negro Classic Ballet
