= Fine and Dandy (musical) =

American musical comedy

- Sheet music
- Music: Kay Swift
- Lyrics: Paul James
- Book: Donald Ogden Stewart

Fine and Dandy is a musical comedy in two acts with a book by Donald Ogden Stewart, music by Kay Swift and lyrics by Paul James. It was produced on Broadway in 1930.

== Production ==
Donald Ogden Stewart was commissioned to write a musical comedy tailored to the unique comic persona of vaudeville performer Joe Cook. Much of the book was improvised; the Playbill for the original Broadway production, after listing the credits for book, music and lyrics, adds "Many Nonsensical Moments Created by Joe Cook".

After a try-out at the Colonial Theatre in Boston, Fine and Dandy premiered on Broadway at Erlanger's Theatre on September 23, 1930, and closed on May 2, 1931, after 255 performances. It was produced by Morris Green and Lewis E. Gensler. The production was directed by Green and the dialogue was directed by Frank McCoy, with choreography by Tom Nip and Dave Gould and orchestration by Hans Spialek. The routines for the Abbott Dancers were arranged by Merriel Abbott, and the dance for Mechanical Ballet was arranged by Eugene Von Grona. Scenic design was by Henry Dreyfuss, with costumes by Charles LeMaire.

In 2007, three years after the successful release of a new studio cast recording, the Kay Swift Memorial Trust commissioned a new libretto which would remove Cook's vaudeville routines and change the setting from the Fordyce Drop Forge and Tool Company to a shoe factory, Fordyce Feet. In a newspaper interview, Swift's granddaughter Katharine Weber said, "It will be true to the spirit but will go in different directions." There will be no orchestra, but the actors will be "oddballs who play music on very non-standard instruments."

== Principal characters ==
- Joe Squibb, former mechanic and new general manager of the Fordyce Drop Forge and Tool Company
- Wiffington, Joe's sidekick
- Mrs. Fordyce, a widow and owner of the Fordyce Company
- Maribelle (Note: Spelled "Maribelle" in the 1930 Playbill and "Marabelle" in the 2004 reconstruction.) Fordyce, her daughter, George's love interest
- Nancy Ellis, factory employee, Joe's love interest
- George Ellis, Yale graduate, factory employee, Nancy's brother
- Mr. Ellis, former manager, father of Nancy and George
- Edgar Little, assistant manager, engaged to Nancy
- Miss Hunter, company secretary and tap dancer extraordinaire

== Cast ==
Character	Original Broadway cast (1930)	Studio recording (2004)
Joe Squibb	Joe Cook	Mario Cantone
Wiffington	Dave Chasen	—
Mrs. Fordyce	Dora Maughan	Anne Kaufman
Maribelle Fordyce	Nell O'Day	Jennifer Laura Thompson
Nancy Ellis	Alice Boulden	Carolee Carmello
George Ellis	Joe Wagstaff	Gavin Creel
Mr. Ellis	George A. Schiller	—
Edgar Little	John W. Ehrle	Mark Linn-Baker
Miss Hunter	Eleanor Powell	Andrea Burns

Additional members of the large Broadway cast included the Merriel Abbott Specialty Dancers, the Tommy Atkins Sextet, (Note: Six young men who executed acrobatic choreography while dressed in white tie and tails. They had been appearing in a vaudeville act with Nell O'Day for several years before they joined Fine and Dandy.) the Four Horsemen, and, according to a contemporary review, a "beauty chorus of 60 lithe and lustrous girls".

Theater historian Dan Dietz suggests that some of the comedy quartets, such as the Uninternational Four, the Four Horsemen, and the Giersdorf Brothers, may actually have been Joe Cook playing multiple roles, as he did in his well-known "Four Hawaiians" skit.

== Synopsis ==
Setting: The Fordyce Drop Forge and Tool Factory; a country club; a golf course; the Fordyce Night School; the employees' picnic grounds; a bank; and Mrs. Fordyce's garden.

"Joe Squibb, proud to be a working man if he does not have to work much, becomes general manager of the Fordyce Drop Forge and Tool factory when the widow who owns it falls captive to his brash charms." "Squibb ... is engaged to lovely Nancy Ellis, and ultimately reveals himself to be married and the father of four children. Also as Joe Squibb he lights a bearded man's whiskers, impersonates four German acrobats, plays the saxophone and ukulele, turns handsprings, plays golf with a shovel, eats lunch from a lunchbox the size of an automobile crate, examines the insurance doctor come to examine him, creates a gadget that can puncture balloons while cracking nuts and another for inflating paper bags so that when punctured they can make a resounding noise."

In a review, Edwin C. Stein said, "Donald Ogden Stewart's book is woefully weak. I can't tell you just what the book is about because I didn't pay it a great deal of attention. And neither will you."

== Musical numbers ==
Songs, dances and novelty numbers as listed in the Playbill for the original production. The show was frequently revised during its run; a song that became a standard, "Nobody Breaks My Heart", was added to the wedding scene shortly after the show opened.

The "Mechanical Ballet" was arranged by choreographer Eugene Von Grona. The music has been lost; it may or may not have been written by Kay Swift. New York Times theater critic Brooks Atkinson called it "the most stunning dance number [with the Tommy Atkins Sextet] attired in costumes of original color schemes, against quiet and expansive backgrounds". It may have been an homage or a parody of George Antheil's Ballet Mécanique, which had its New York premier in 1927.

Act I

- Chant — The Entire Ensemble
- "Rich or Poor" — Maribelle, George and Ensemble
- "Fine and Dandy" — Joe Squibb and Nancy
- "Wheels of Steel" — Edgar
- "Mechanical Ballet" — Tommy Atkins Sextet, Jack Hanlen and Ensemble
- "Starting at the Bottom" — George and Ensemble
- "Can This Be Love?" — Nancy
- "I'll Hit a New High" — Miss Hunter, Tommy Atkins Sextet and Ensemble
- "Fine and Dandy" (reprise) — Maribelle, Tommy Atkins Sextet and Ensemble
- "Giddyup Back" — Joe Squibb and Horses
- "Fordyce" — Ensemble
- "Finaletto" — The Entire Company
- "Let's Go Eat Worms in the Garden" — Nancy, George, Betsy Rees (billed as "Miss Needles"), Uninternational Four and Ensemble

Act II

- Opening — Ensemble with the Merriel Abbott Specialty Dancers
- "Jig Hop" — Miss Hunter and Ensemble
- "Bird in Hand" — George and Maribelle
- Specialties — The Giersdorf Brothers
- "That Thing I Can't Forget" — Mrs. Fordyce
- "Starting at the Bottom" (reprise) — Abbott Dancers, Boys and Jimmy Hadreas (billed as "Office Boy")
- "Can This Be Love" (reprise) — Edgar, Maribelle and George
- "Wedding Bells" — Ensemble
- Waltz Ballet — Betsy Rees and Abbott Dancers
- Finale — Entire Company

=== Recording ===
No original cast recording was made; most of the orchestrations and dance music were lost, with the exception of several songs which had been published individually. Orchestrator Russell Warner teamed with Swift in the 1980s to reconstruct the score. After Swift's death in 1993, Warner continued to work on the project for ten years. A studio recording was released in 2004 by PS Classics with a cast that included Andrea Burns, Mario Cantone, Carolee Carmello, Gavin Creel, Mark Linn-Baker, Jennifer Laura Thompson, Deborah Tranelli, and Anne Kaufman. The recorded score drops "Mechanical Ballet", "Giddyup Back" and "Bird in Hand", and includes several numbers not explicitly listed in the Playbill for the original production. Historian Dan Dietz writes that these may have been listed under a different name or were part of another number.

- "Machine Shop Opening" — Edgar and ensemble. May have been "Chant" and/or "Wheels of Steel".
- "Sing High" — Male ensemble. May have been part of the "Mechanical Ballet".
- "Etiquette" — Edgar and ensemble. May have been part of the act II "Opening". Originally sung by Joe.
- "Nobody Breaks My Heart" — Nancy. Added later in the run of the original production.
- "Nature Will Provide" — Wedding singer. May have been part of the "Waltz Ballet" or the finale.

== Reception ==
Brooks Atkinson of The New York Times wrote, "Next to Leonardo da Vinci, Joe Cook is the most versatile man known to recorded times." The Brooklyn Citizen raved, "Fine and Dandy is one of the most side-splitting, amazingly funny musical comedies that has ever been produced on Broadway."

== Historical notes ==
Fine and Dandy was the first successful Broadway musical to feature a complete score by a female composer, running for over 250 performances.

The Times Union (Brooklyn, New York) reported that among those in the audience for the opening night performance were George Gershwin, Ira Gershwin, Ted Lewis, Al Jolson, Ruby Keeler, Marc Connelly, Judith Anderson, William Demarest, E. Ray Goetz, and Irving Caesar.

== Sources ==
- Atkinson, J. Brooks (September 24, 1930). "The Play: Presenting Joe Cook". The New York Times.
- Dietz, Dan (2018). The Complete Book of 1930s Broadway Musicals. Lanham, Maryland: Rowman & Littlefield. ISBN 9781538102770.
- Ewen, David. Complete Book of the American Musical Theater, (2nd Ed.) Henry Holt and Company, New York, 1959, pp. 368–369.
- Mantle, Burns (ed.) The Best Plays of 1930–31, Dodd, Mead and Company, New York, 1931, pp. 417–418.

=== Reviews ===
- Stein, Edwin C. (September 24, 1930). "Joe Cook Panics Audience in Tuneful Musical Comedy in Premiere at Erlanger Theatre". Standard Union. Brooklyn, New York. p. 11.
- Pollock, Arthur (September 24, 1930). "New Joe Cook Show Arrives". The Brooklyn Daily Eagle. p. 21.
- Mantle, Burns (September 24, 1930). "Joe Cook and 'Fine and Dandy'". Daily News. New York, New York. p. 161.
