= International Sound Version =

International Sound Version (also known as Foreign Sound Version) is a term for a film in which all dialogue is replaced with music and foreign inter-titles. It was a method used by movie studios during the early talkie period (1928–1931) to make sound films for foreign markets. This method was much cheaper than the alternative, the "Foreign Language Version", in which the entire film was re-shot with a cast that was fluent in the appropriate language (e.g. Spanish version of Drácula (1931), Laurel and Hardy shorts in Spanish, French and German).

To make an international version, the studio would simply insert (on the soundtrack) music over any dialogue in the film and splice in intertitles (which would be replaced with the appropriate language of the country). Singing sequences were left intact as well as any sound sequences that did not involve speaking.

International versions were sound versions of films which the producing company did not feel were worth the expense of re-shooting in a foreign language. They were meant to cash in on the talkie craze; by 1930 anything with sound did well at the box-office while silent films were largely ignored by the public. These "international sound versions" were basically part-talkies and were largely silent except for musical sequences. Since the film included a synchronized music and a sound effect track, it could be advertised as a sound picture and could therefore capitalize on the talkie craze in foreign markets (instead of the more expensive method of actually re-filming talking sequences in foreign languages).

Warner Bros. was the first to begin issuing these "International Sound Versions." In 1928, they began to release their part-talkies and all-talkies in this format. They would always leave musical interludes and non-dialogue sound sequences intact. On occasion, they would dub the theme song into Spanish, French or German in order to further popularize the music.

Starting in 1931, studios began to subtitle films, a method still in widespread use today and both "International Sound Versions" and "Foreign Language Versions" quietly disappeared, although the latter method continued to be employed until the mid-1930s for special productions until it became feasible to dub films into foreign languages. Such films as My Man (1928), Honky Tonk (1929), and Is Everybody Happy? (1929) were seen throughout the world in "International Sound Versions". In the "International Sound Version" of Paris (1929), which was especially prepared for French markets, the Warner Bros. had Irene Bordoni sing several of her songs in French.

Surviving examples of "International Sound Versions" include The Shakedown (1929), Song o' My Heart (1930), Phantom Of The Opera (1929), The Lone Star Ranger (1930), Men Without Women (1930), All Quiet On The Western Front (1930), Rain or Shine (1930), etc.

== See also ==
- Part-talkie
- Sound film
- History of film
- List of early Warner Bros. talking features
