= The Tip-Off (film) =

1931 film directed by Albert S. Rogell

- Theatrical poster for the film
- Directed by: Albert S. Rogell
- Screenplay by: Earl Baldwin
- Story by: George Kibbe Turner
- Produced by: Charles R. Rogers
- Starring: Eddie Quillan; Robert Armstrong; Ginger Rogers; Joan Peers; Ralf Harolde
- Cinematography: Edward Snyder
- Edited by: Charles Craft
- Music by: Arthur Lange
- Production company: RKO Pictures
- Distributed by: RKO Pictures
- Release date: October 16, 1931
- Running time: 71 minutes
- Country: United States
- Language: English

The Tip-Off is a 1931 American pre-Code comedy film directed by Albert S. Rogell, written by Earl Baldwin, and starring Eddie Quillan, Robert Armstrong, Ginger Rogers, Joan Peers and Ralf Harolde. The film was released on October 16, 1931, by RKO Pictures.

== Plot ==
Young Tommy Jordan is sent for a repair job. When he arrives at the address he was told, two guys are waiting for him on the street, bringing him somewhere else—without letting him see where—to repair a radio. He jokes about "must be a hide-out, that I should not know where I am", for which he earns a "you're a smart guy".

When left in the apartment doing his job, he follows a wire and ends up in the bedroom, lying on the floor under the bed. The telephone rings and a woman comes out of the bathroom and answers. He is trapped under the bed and can only see her legs.

When the lady has finished her conversation, they talk and he is told that his great idol Kayo McClure a fighter lives in that apartment. She herself is "famous" Babyface the woman of McClure.

When McClure comes home, Tommy manages to hide and when Gang leader Nick Vatelli appears in McClure's apartment with his men threatening him, Tommy acts as police officers through the radio-microphone, so that they leave the flat. McClure is forever thankful to Tommy and he offers to help him whenever he needs it. McClure hands him a ticket to a ball.

When he gets to the ball, there is Babyface eager to dance with him. To avoid being mixed up too much with her attracting jealousy of McClure, he grabs another girl, who was handy to him, to dance. This girl is even worse, however, as she is the fiancé of Nick, Edna Moreno. Tommy is very fond of her and when Nick appears he finally takes Edna with him to McClure, to hide for a night. The next day Babyface argues with McClure about hiding the kids, threatening to leave him. Edna leaves the apartment without saying anything. Tommy finds out where she is, and with the help of McClure he saves her from marrying Nick. As the movie ends, Tommy and Edna get married.

== Cast ==
- Eddie Quillan as Thomas 'Tommy' Jordan
- Robert Armstrong as Kayo McClure
- Ginger Rogers as Babyface
- Joan Peers as Edna Moreno
- Ralf Harolde as Nick Vatelli
- Mike Donlin as Swanky Jones
- Ernie Adams as Slug McGee
- Charles Sellon as Pop Jackson
- Helen Ainsworth as Miss Ethel Waddums
- Luis Alberni as Scarno - Roadhouse Manager (uncredited)
- Harry Bowen as Dude - Vatelli Henchman (uncredited)
- Frank Darien as Edna's Uncle (uncredited)
- Dorothy Granger as Hatcheck Girl (uncredited)
- Pat Harmon as Vatelli Henchman (uncredited)
- Jack Herrick as Jack - Kayo's Sparring Partner (uncredited)
- Ethan Laidlaw as Henchman (uncredited)
- Charles Sullivan as Chuck - Bouncer at Scarno's (uncredited)
- Harry Wilson as Hood at Scarno's (uncredited)

== Release ==
The film went through several titles before being released as The Tip-Off, including Eddie Cuts In and The Lady Killer. It was released as Looking For Trouble in the UK.

When the film premiered at the Broadway Theatre, it was preceded by Ulises Armand Sanabria's live demonstration of early television technology.
