= Applause (1929 film) =

American "talkie" by Rouben Mamoulian

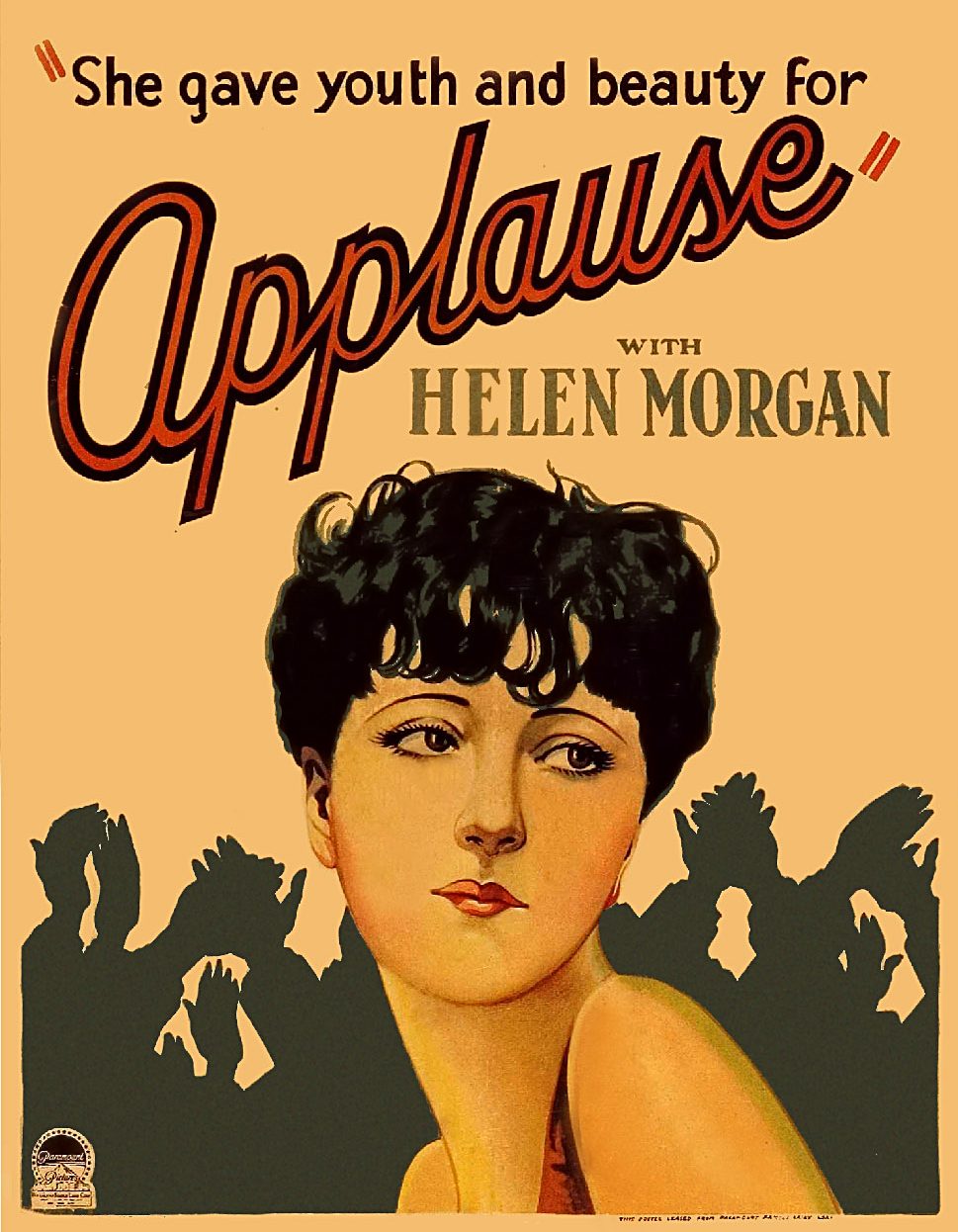
- Theatrical release poster
- Directed by: Rouben Mamoulian
- Written by: Garrett Fort
- Based on: Applause by Beth Brown
- Produced by: Monta Bell; Walter Wanger (uncredited)
- Starring: Helen Morgan; Jack Cameron; Joan Peers
- Cinematography: George J. Folsey
- Edited by: John Bassler
- Distributed by: Paramount Pictures
- Release dates: October 7, 1929 (New York premiere); January 4, 1930 (United States)
- Running time: 80 minutes
- Country: United States
- Language: English

Applause is a 1929 pre-Code American backstage musical "talkie" directed by Rouben Mamoulian in his directorial debut and starring Helen Morgan, Jack Cameron, and Joan Peers. It was shot at Paramount's Astoria Studios in Astoria, New York during the early years of sound films.

Applause is adapted from the 1928 novel by Beth Brown, a former chorus girl, about an aging burlesque queen who sacrifices herself for her daughter so that the latter can escape her mother's sordid fate.

The film is notable as one of the earliest films of its time to break free from the restrictions of bulky sound technology equipment in order to shoot on location around Manhattan. In 2006, Applause was selected for preservation in the National Film Registry of the Library of Congress, being deemed "culturally, historically, or aesthetically significant".

The film's copyright expired on January 1, 2025, resulting in the film entering the public domain.

== Plot ==
The film

The first scene has a marching band playing Theodore Mentz's "A Hot Time in the Old Town".

The film tells of Kitty Darling, a burlesque star. Upon the recommendation of burlesque clown and suitor, Joe King, Kitty sends her young daughter to a convent to get her away from the sleazy burlesque environment she is involved.

Many years later, Kitty is not doing so well, and her best days are behind her. She is now an alcoholic who lives in the past. She lives with a burlesque comic named Hitch. Hitch cheats on her and only cares about spending what little money she has. When he finds out that she has been paying for her daughter's convent education for over a decade, he pushes her to bring April home.

Her grown, but naive daughter April returns. Kitty is embarrassed by her condition and marries Hitch so that April will not be ashamed of her.

When April arrives, she is disgusted with her mother and her sad life. Hitch tries to force her into show business and repeatedly gropes her, at one point forcing a kiss on her.

April roams the city and meets a lonely young sailor named Tony. They fall in love, agree to marry, and plan for April to visit his home in Wisconsin. When April goes to tell her mother about their plans, she overhears Hitch belittling Kitty, calling her a "has-been."

April is upset and calls off her wedding. She decides to join the chorus line of a burlesque show. She says a reluctant goodbye to Tony at the subway. Meanwhile, Kitty takes an overdose of sleeping pills. The bottle clearly says "For insomnia one tablet only". She goes downstairs to the show and collapses on a couch.

Knowing that Kitty cannot perform in the show, the producer berates her, mistaking her reaction to the overdose for delirium tremens. April, not realizing what is happening, says she will take Kitty's place despite Kitty's objections. She tells Kitty she will take care of her now, like Kitty always did for April. As April goes on stage, Kitty passes away, her head hanging over the edge of the couch.

April is disgusted at herself and cannot complete the show. As she runs off the stage, Tony is there to greet her. He says he had a feeling she did not mean what she was saying. She hugs him close and says she wants to go far away. Not realizing Kitty is dead, she says they will need to take care of her mother too, and Tony agrees.

The final shot is a close-up of the Kitty Darling poster on the wall behind Tony and April.

== Cast ==
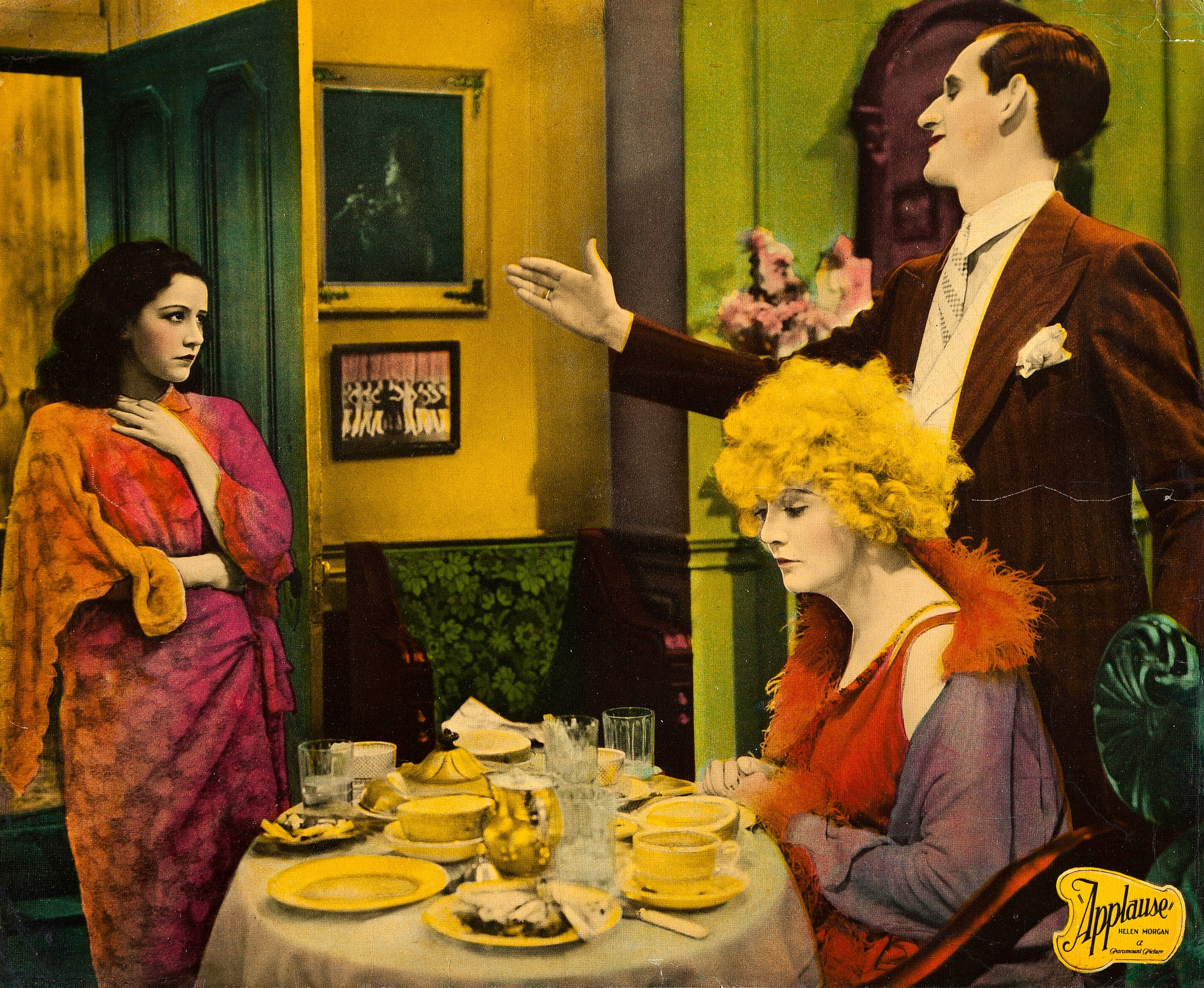
The film stars Helen Morgan (right), with Fuller Mellish Jr. and Joan Peers (left).

- Helen Morgan as Kitty Darling
- Joan Peers as April Darling
- Fuller Mellish Jr. (Note: son of Fuller Mellish) as Hitch Nelson
- Jack Cameron as Joe King
- Henry Wadsworth as Tony
- Dorothy Cumming as Mother Superior
- Mack Gray as Slim's Brother
- David Holt as Jack Singer

== Production ==
Broadway stage producer Rouben Mamoulian was engaged by Jesse Lasky and Walter Wanger of Paramount studios to direct a film based on the Beth Brown novel Applause (1928) The picture was filmed in Astoria Studios in New York, rather than in Hollywood, California.

Helen Morgan, a widely acclaimed torch singer, had recently achieved fame playing the tragic honky-tonk girl Julie Laverne in the Broadway production of Show Boat (1926) The 26-year-old Morgan was enlisted to play the aging and "ravaged" cabaret singer, Kitty Darling, a mother to a 17-year-old daughter, Kitty (played by Joan Peers). For her first film role, Morgan put on 25 pounds (11 kg) and donned wigs and "unflattering" outfits, concealing her actual attractiveness, and producing a haggard, bloated appearance. Morgan, notorious for her drinking, abided by director Mamoulian's demand that she restrict her alcohol consumption during filming.

== Songs ==
- "What Wouldn't I Do For That Man" (1929) (by Jay Gorney (music) and Yip Harburg (lyrics))
- "Give Your Little Baby Lots of Lovin'" (1928) (by Joe Burke (as Joseph A. Burke, music) and Theodora Morse (as Dolly Morse, lyrics))
- "Pretty Baby" (1916)
- "Waiting for the Robert E. Lee" (1912) (by Lewis F. Muir (music) and L. Wolfe Gilbert (lyrics))
- "Everybody's Doing It Now (The Turkey Trot)" (1911) (by Irving Berlin)
- "I've Got a Feeling I'm Falling"
- "Yaaka Hula Hickey Dula (Hawaiian Love Song)" (1916) (by E. Ray Goetz, Joe Young and Pete Wendling)

== Release ==
The film opened strongly on October 7, 1929, at New York City's Criterion Theatre, which was celebrating its 35th anniversary. Also featured was a short film in which Charles K. Harris sang his classic song "After the Ball".

== Critical reception ==
=== Contemporary reception ===
Applause enjoyed overwhelming critical acclaim, largely for its "technical and innovations and artistry." The moving-going public did not agree, and the film was "a box-office failure." A combination of the mixed audience reception, misleading advertising (the publicity focused on glamour shots of Helen Morgan, not what she looked like in the film), downbeat subject matter, and the Stock Market Crash caused the movie to fade significantly as soon as it left the Criterion.

Critic Mordaunt Hall, writing for The New York Times, liked the acting but was troubled by some of Rouben Mamoulian's direction. He wrote "The opening chapters are none too interesting and subsequently one anticipates pretty much what's going to happen...however, Mr. Mamoulian commits the unpardonable sin of being far too extravagant. He becomes tedious in his scenes of the convent and there is nothing but viciousness in his stage passages."

Photoplay described the film as "a curious one", but recommended for the performances by Morgan and Joan Peers. The anonymous reviewer thought the two leads, "and some nice camera work, help save a confusing job".

=== Retrospective appraisal ===
Rather than merely satisfying the public's clamor for "talkies" dominated by dialogue, Mamoulian revisited the cinematic elements of the silent era in Applause. Film historian Spergel observed that "Applause owes a great deal to the techniques of silent filmmaking...the film depends on imagery and montage rather than dialogue for its greatest impact."

The Library of Congress states:

Many have compared Mamoulian's debut to that of Orson Welles' Citizen Kane because of his flamboyant use of cinematic innovation to test technical boundaries. The tear-jerking plot boasts top performances from Morgan as the fading burlesque queen, Fuller Mellish Jr. as her slimy paramour and Joan Peers as her cultured daughter. However, the film is remembered today chiefly for Mamoulian's audacious style. While most films of the era were static and stage-bound, Mamoulian's camera reinvigorated the melodramatic plot by prowling relentlessly through sordid backstage life.

== Revival, restoration, and home video release ==
- In 1939, Henry Hathaway nearly remade the film with Marlene Dietrich. Applause was rediscovered in the early 1960s, and there was talk of a stage musical with Judy Garland as Kitty and Liza Minnelli as April. (The musical Applause, based on the 1950 movie All About Eve, has no relation to the 1929 film.)
- The film was restored by the UCLA Film and Television Archive.
- The film was released on DVD in 2003 through Kino Video (under license from current rightsholders Universal Studios). Special features included comments Rouben Mamoulian made for the 1986 50th anniversary of the Directors Guild of America, censorship notes, a 1929 interview with Mamoulian, rare photos and promotional materials, 1933 newsreel footage of Helen Morgan and her second husband, a clip of Morgan singing "What Wouldn't I Do for That Man?" in the 1929 musical Glorifying the American Girl, excerpts from the Beth Brown novel, and essays on Morgan and the film, written by Christopher S. Connelly.

== See also ==
- List of American films of 1929
- List of early sound feature films (1926–1929)
