= American Negro Ballet Company =

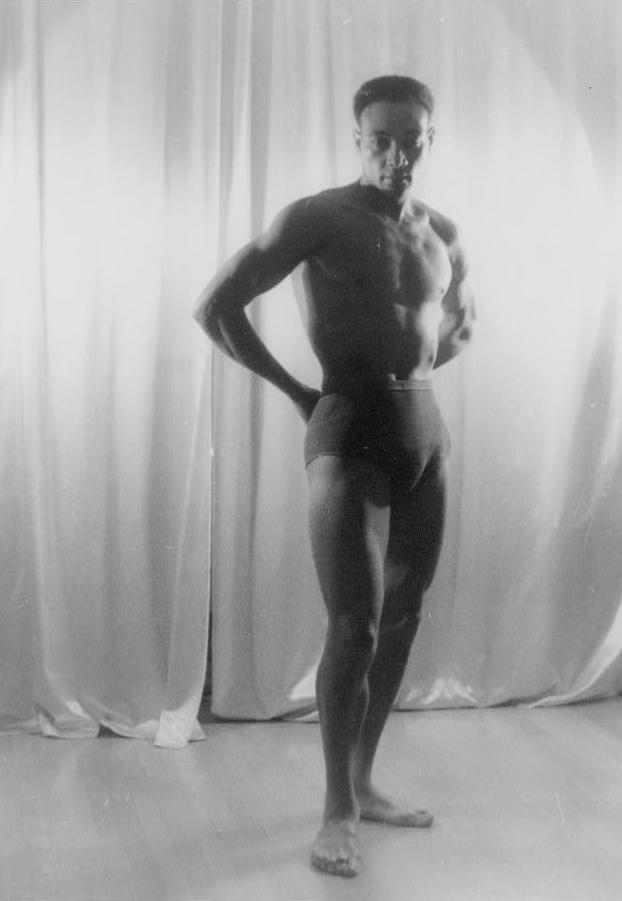
Al Bledger American Negro Ballet, 1938

The American Negro Ballet Company, also known as the von Grona Ballet, was formed in 1934 under the auspices of Eugene Von Grona, a German dancer and choreographer, who was fascinated by Black culture and dance. The company performed classical ballet pieces, as well as modern dance works.

== History ==
=== Performances ===
The American Negro Ballet had its debut performance at the Lafayette Theatre on November 21, 1937. Dean Dixon conducted an all-Negro orchestra that accompanied the opening night program. The dancers performed to Bacchanalian Children of the Earth (music by Reginald Foresythe), St. Louis Women (music by W. C. Handy), Stravinsky’s Firebird Suite (music by phonograph), and to the music of Duke Ellington.

After its debut, the company performed in Brighton, England, in 1938.

=== Company disbandment and reformation ===
The American Negro Ballet had a brief tenure, disbanding in 1938. The following year, the company reformed as "Von Grona's American Negro Ballet." Many members of the original American Negro Ballet joined Von Grona's group and were featured dancers in Lew Leslie’s Blackbird of 1939, an all-black production starring Lena Horne and choreography by Von Grona.

In addition, several original members of the American Negro Ballet performed with the Negro Symphony Orchestra in 1939, and in Agnes de Mille’s Black Ritual (Obeah), which had its 1940 world premiere as part of Ballet Theatre’s inaugural season. DeMille's work was specifically designed for black and brown ballerinas.

== Company members ==
The American Negro Ballet was originally composed of twenty to thirty jazz dancers who were recruited to perform in a modern dance concert. The company's principals included Lavinia Williams, Al Bledger, Coleman Hill, Harry Young, and Beryl James, who danced in the group's production of Stravinsky's "Firebird."

First	Last	American Negro Ballet (ANB)	Lew Leslie's Blackbird of 1939 (LEW)	Negro Symphony Orchestra Concert (NSC)	Black Ritual (Obeah) (BRO)
Teddy	Allen	ANB		NSC	
Carole	Ash				BRO
Maudelle	Bass				BRO
Valerie	Black	ANB			BRO
Verona	Blackburn		LEW		
Al	Bledger	ANB	LEW	NSC	
Marion	Brown	ANB	LEW	NSC	
Valerie	Cavell			NSC	
Beryl Theodore	Clarke James	ANB	LEW	NSC	
Clementina	Collingwood				BRO
Muriel	Cook				BRO
Azelean	Cox				BRO
Jon	Edward(s)	ANB		NSC	
Anthony	Fleming	ANB		NSC	
Viola	Gibson	ANB		NSC	
Violet	Gray		LEW		
Frank	Green	ANB		NSC	
Mabel	Hart				BRO
Coleman	Hill	ANB	LEW	NSC	
Edith	Hurd		LEW		BRO
Anne	Jones				BRO
Dorothy	Jones Williams	ANB	LEW	NSC	
Lawuane	Kennard				BRO
Beryl	Murray		LEW		
Harriet	Oliver	ANB		NSC	
Evelyn	Pilcher Crittenden	ANB		NSC	BRO
Renu	Roma		LEW		
Edith	Ross		LEW	NSC	BRO
James	Smith	ANB		NSC	
Pearl	Spears	ANB		NSC	
Hazel	Spence	ANB	LEW	NSC	
Hettie	Stephens	ANB	LEW	NSC	
Wahneta	Talley	ANB	LEW	NSC	
Willard	Taylor	ANB	LEW	NSC	
Mary	Tennant		LEW		
Elizabeth	Thompson			NSC	BRO
Dorothy	Williams				BRO
Elizabeth	Williams		LEW		
Lavinia	Williams	ANB	LEW	NSC	BRO
Bernice	Willis				BRO
Harry	Young	ANB		NSC	
