= Rain or Shine (film) =

1930 film

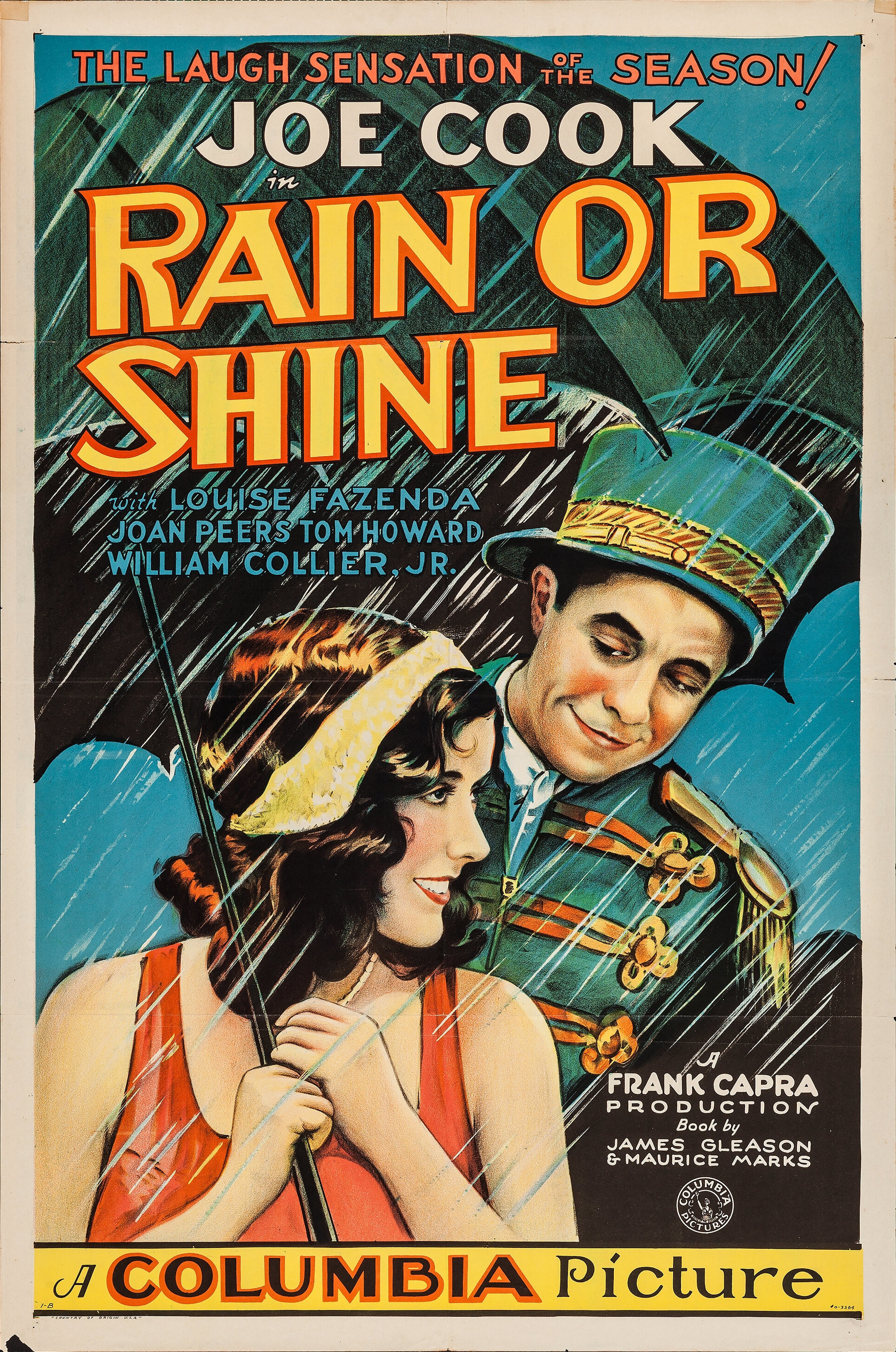
- Directed by: Frank Capra
- Written by: Jo Swerling; Dorothy Howell
- Based on: Rain or Shine; 1928 play by James Gleason; Maurice Marks
- Produced by: Harry Cohn
- Starring: Joe Cook; Louise Fazenda; Joan Peers
- Cinematography: Joe Walker
- Edited by: Maurice Wright
- Music by: Milton Ager; Jack Yellen
- Production companies: Columbia Pictures; Frank R. Capra Production
- Distributed by: Columbia Pictures
- Release date: August 15, 1930
- Running time: 90 minutes
- Country: United States
- Language: English

Rain or Shine is a 1930 American pre-Code film directed by Frank Capra and starring Joe Cook, Louise Fazenda and Joan Peers. In the on-screen credits, Fazenda and Peers are shown side by side, with Fazenda first. In fact Peers plays the heroine. Fazenda appears as a Cooch dancer in what might be called a cameo role today. The film was adapted from a hit Broadway musical of the same name and was originally planned as a full-scale musical. Due to the public backlash against musical films (beginning in the latter part of the summer of 1930), all musical numbers were discarded before release. This move proved to be prudent as the film was a box office success, continuing the streak of hits Capra directed for the young Columbia Pictures studio.

As a film published in 1930, it entered the public domain on January 1, 2026.

== Plot ==
Rain or Shine (1930)

The opening credits roll over a peppy instrumental rendition of “Singing in the Rain.” The “Greater John T. Rainey Shows” traveling circus was successful when Mary Rainey inherited it from her father, but by the end of the first season they are struggling. Drenching rains make things worse. Dalton the ringmaster and Foltz the lion tamer are secretly conspiring to take over the circus in the next town, Shrewsberry.

Since her father's death, Mary has relied on the circus' fast-talking con-artist manager, Smiley. She does not realize that he is in love with her. Mary and Bud Conway are secretly in love. Bud is a newcomer to the circus life, and Shrewsberry is his hometown. He expects big business there, and plans to introduce Mary to his socially prominent parents, indicating he wants to marry her.

Foltz refuses to perform with his lions until they are fed. Smiley persuades local children to bring pieces of meat to exchange for free tickets. He also talks Amos Shrewsberry, a local creditor, into “investing” in the show. (Comedic encounters between Smiley and Amos are spread throughout the film.)

Bud's wealthy father—who may be willing to invest in the show—throws a party at the Country Club for Mary and all Bud's friends from the circus. Smiley and others deliberately ruin the occasion with “comic” routines, exposing the circus' desperate financial straits and leading Mr. Conway to assume Mary is a gold-digger.

The circus is packed the next day, bringing in enough money to pay debts and the delayed salaries. When Smiley tells Mary he won't let her marry Bud, she tells him to go. Naively, she asks Dalton to take over as manager. He tells the box office to turn over all the cash to a sheriff who has shown up with an attachment. Pretending to help, he persuades the staff to do the opening parade, expecting they will be furious and strike when they learn their salaries cannot be paid after all.

They do refuse to go back on, but Mary does her act, hoping the others will follow. They don't. Meanwhile, Bud finds Smiley strolling along the railroad tracks and races back to the circus, where Mary has just signed a controlling interest over to Dalton. Smiley tears up the contract and fires the conspirators, leaving the circus without a large troupe of acrobats, a ringmaster, a lion tamer or a calliope player. Other players step forward to take their places. Bud becomes ringmaster and Nero takes to the calliope. Smiley, who has already demonstrated his skills as a magician, exhibits an impressive array of acrobat's routines.

Smiley sends Mary away with Bud, but before they can leave, Dalton tells the audience they are being cheated out on the real, two-hour show and provokes a violent riot. Circus folk holler “Hey rube!” and tie white handkerchiefs around their necks to indicate they are friendlies. Mary and Bud join the fray, Bud wielding a fire hose. Two townsmen haul Mary hanging upside down by her ankle to the peak of the big tent. Another tent catches fire, and the fire hose is accidentally cut. The fire spreads, engulfing the big top. Smiley climbs up and over the outside of the blazing tent to rescue Mary. Bud drives the unconscious Mary away for help.

The circus is a field of smoking ashes. Smiley and Amos engage in a last round of banter. Cut to a very brief shot of circus wagons driving through a night of pouring rain, with Nero playing the Calliope and Smiley riding the elephant. The End appears over a few quick measures of “Singing in the Rain”.

== Cast ==
- Joe Cook as Smiley Johnson
- Louise Fazenda as Frankie
- Joan Peers as Mary Rainey
- William Collier Jr. as Bud Conway
- Tom Howard as Amos K. Shrewsberry
- Dave Chasen as Dave
- Alan Roscoe as Dalton, ringmaster
- Adolph Milar as Foltz, the lion tamer
- Clarence Muse as Nero
- Nella Walker as Mrs Conway
- Edward Martindel as Mr Conway
- Nora Lane as Grace Conway
- Tyrell Davis as Lord Hugo Gwynne

== Production ==
Cook, Howard and Chasen reprised their roles from the musical.

Part of the film was filmed at the Burbank, California ranch of boxer James J. Jeffries, who also appeared in the film.

To capture the fire, Frank Capra burned down the entire set, using several cameras to film it from every possible angle.

Although the musical's songs were not performed, "Rain or Shine" is heard in the background, as is the hit “Happy Days Are Here Again,” which Franklin Delano Roosevelt adopted as his campaign theme song for the 1932 Presidential election.

See the Wikipedia article about Joe Cook to learn how he acquired all the skills showcased in the film.

== Preservation ==
The film survives intact and has been broadcast on television and cable. The International Sound Version of this film also survives. Both versions have been released on DVD.
