= Rain or Shine (musical) =

1928 Broadway musical

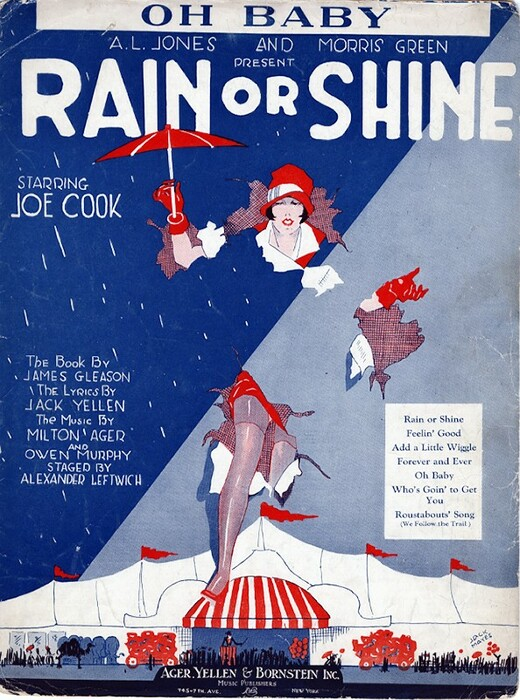
Front cover of sheet music for the song "Oh Baby" by composers Milton Ager and Owen Murphy and lyricist Jack Yellen from the musical Rain or Shine (1928, Ager, Yellen & Bornstein).

Rain or Shine is a musical in two acts with music by Milton Ager and Owen Murphy, lyrics by Jack Yellen, and a book by James Gleason and Maurice Marks. Set in Higginstown, Rhode Island, the musical takes place within a circus and features a variety of circus acts in addition to the typical song and dance numbers from a musical of its time period. It was one of several hit Broadway musicals in 1928.

== Performance history ==
Rain or Shine was staged on at George M. Cohan's Theatre where it premiered on February 9, 1928. It ran at that theatre for 356 performances; closing on December 15, 1928. It was written as a starring vehicle for comedian Joe Cook who portrayed the central character of Smiley Johnson. Other actors in leading roles included Nancy Welford as Mary Wheeler, Warren Hull as Jack Wayne, Janet Velie as Mrs. Patricia Conway, and Helen Lynd as Frankie Shultz.

== Musical numbers ==
Act I

- "Circus Days"
- "Glad Tidings"—Mary Wheeler, Jack Wayne
- "The Parade"
- "Circus Days" (reprise)
- "So Would I"—Smiley Johnson
- "Add a Little Wiggle"—Frankie Shultz
- "Rain or Shine"—Mary Wheeler, Jack Wayne
- "Laugh, Clown, Laugh"
- "Recitation"—Jack Wayne
- "Ballet"
- "Oh, Baby"
- "The Roustabout Song"—Jack Wayne
- "Hey, Rube"

Act II

- "Falling Star"—Mrs. Patricia Conway
- "Feelin' Good"—Frankie Shultz
- "Forever and Ever"—Jack Wayne, Mary Wheeler
- "Who's Gonna Get You?"—Mary Wheeler
- "Acrobatic Dance"
- "Stair Dance"
- "Hand Drill"
- "Elephant Trainers"
- "The Clown Dance"

== Film adaptation ==
It was made into a film of the same name in 1930 by Frank Capra starring Cook, however, none of the songs were performed in the film. The song, "Rain or Shine" is included as background music.
