= First Negro Classic Ballet =

Ballet company in California, United States

General information
- Name: First Negro Classic Ballet
- Year founded: 1946
- Closed: 1956
- Founder: Joseph Rickard

The First Negro Classic Ballet or First Negro Classical Ballet was a ballet company formed in Los Angeles, California in 1946.

== History ==
The First Negro Classic Ballet was founded in 1946 and directed by the American dancer Joseph Rickard in Los Angeles, California.

In 1946, Joseph Rickard, a white dancer, saw an African American child turned away from a Los Angeles dance studio because of her race. Motivated by this injustice, he opened a dance studio for L.A.'s Black population. By 1947, Rickard had founded the First Negro Classic Ballet, offering a place to perform and choreograph. As a young dancer, Rickard trained with top Russian teachers and appeared with the Ballet Theatre and the Ballet Russe.

Selected from Southern California's talented Black dancers, early members included Bernice Harrison, Theodore Crum, Yvonne Miller, Sylvia Bartlett, and Graham Johnson. The troupe's choreography was directed by Rickard, with Claudius Wilson, a Black composer-concert pianist, handling the musical direction.

The company held its first recital on October 19, 1946, at the Danish Auditorium in Los Angeles.

Over two years, they developed a ballet repertoire blending music from classical European composers with compositions by contemporary Black artists. Sponsored by Los Angeles-based impresario Irwin Parnes, the dance troupe formally premiered on November 19, 1949, at the Lobero Theatre in Santa Barbara. Not long after, they made their debut appearances in L.A. at the Assistance League Playhouse on November 25–26, 1949. At the Playhouse, musical director Claudius Wilson premiered his compositions, "Harlots' House," a two-act narrative ballet adapted from Oscar Wilde's The Harlot's House, and "L'Harlequin," a ballet version of Pagliacci. The program included classic pieces such as "Variations Classique" by Johann Sebastian Bach, "Trios Etudes de Danse" by Frédéric Chopin, and "Symphonic Etudes" by Robert Schumann. It also featured "A Little China Figure" by Franco Leoni, accompanied by music from Camille Saint-Saens, and concluded with "Landscape" by Alexander Gretchaninov. The settings for both appearances were designed by Robert Usher, with Richard Kollorsz assisting, while Nancy Cappola designed the costumes.

Following an appearance at the Los Angeles Philharmonic Auditorium in 1951, famed screenwriter Ben Hecht said, "The First Negro Classic Ballet has more art in it than a gallery of Rembrandts. The art is in the soul of its members. I have never seen a group of people more dedicated to the expression of something beautiful. They not only dance, they live a dream life on the stage."

On February 15, 1952, the ballet company appeared at UCLA's Royce Hall during Negro History Week, sponsored by UCLA and the Los Angeles Committee on National History Week. Later that year, the First Negro Classic Ballet became known as the Hollywood Negro Ballet.

Joseph Rickard was engaged by New York choreographer Edward Flemyng, who proposed combining their companies. Rickard's First Negro Classic Ballet and Flemyng's New York Negro Ballet were merged in 1956 after the dissolution of the First Negro Classical Ballet.

== See also ==
- New York Negro Ballet
