= Bert Swor =

American minstrel performer (1871–1943)

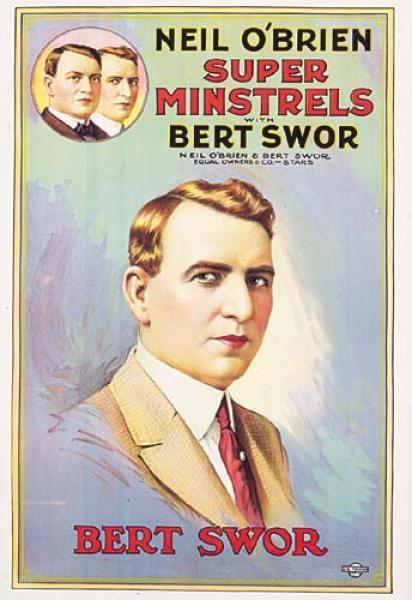
Bert Swor poster circa 1910

Bertie Odell Swor, Sr. (January 9, 1871 – November 30, 1943) was a minstrel show performer.

== Biography ==
He was born on January 9, 1871, in Paris, Tennessee, to Albert Gallatin Swor and Susan Martha Boyd. He started a vaudeville act with his brother, John Francis Swor. When Moran and Mack were temporarily estranged, he worked with George Moran as part of the Two Black Crows routine.

He married Amy B. Archer (1911–1974) around 1894 and they had a child, Bert O'Dell Swor, Jr. (1895–1931).

He performed with the minstrel show of Al G. Fields from 1911 to 1931. In 1931, he was in the Broadway show Brass Ankle.

He retired in 1931. A benefit was given in his honor in Dallas, Texas, in April 1941.

He died in a hotel room in Tulsa, Oklahoma, on December 1, 1943. His widow married Jack Norworth in 1951.

== Films ==
- A Colorful Sermon (1928)
- The Carnation Kid (1929)
- Why Bring That Up? (1929)
- Rainbow's End (1938)
