= Anybody's War =

1930 film

- Directed by: Richard Wallace
- Screenplay by: Lloyd Corrigan; Hector Turnbull; Walter Weems
- Starring: George Moran; Charles Mack; Joan Peers; Neil Hamilton; Walter Weems; Betty Farrington
- Cinematography: Allen G. Siegler
- Edited by: Otho Lovering
- Production company: Paramount Pictures
- Distributed by: Paramount Pictures
- Release date: July 10, 1930
- Running time: 90 minutes
- Country: United States
- Language: English

Anybody's War is a 1930 American pre-Code "Two Black Crows" comedy film directed by Richard Wallace and written by Lloyd Corrigan, Hector Turnbull and Walter Weems. The film stars George Moran, Charles Mack, Joan Peers, Neil Hamilton, Walter Weems and Betty Farrington. The film was released on July 10, 1930, by Paramount Pictures.

The film features Moran and Mack in blackface going to the frontline of the war in France and involved in a love story. The film is an adaptation of Charles E. Mack's Two Black Crows in the A.E.F. Columbia Records published a recording of the performers acting out the show. The film followed their 1929 film Why Bring That Up?. They also had a radio show.

== Cast ==
- George Moran as Willie
- Charles Mack as Amos Crow
- Joan Peers as Mary Jane Robinson
- Neil Hamilton as Red Reinhardt
- Walter Weems as Sergeant Skipp
- Betty Farrington as Camilla
- Walter McGrail as Captain Davis
