= Charles Sellers =

Charles Sellers may refer to:

- Charles Mack (blackface performer) (born Charles Sellers, 1888–1934), American actor
- Charles Grier Sellers (1923–2021), American historian, The Market Revolution
- Charles Coleman Sellers (1903–1980), American historian, Bancroft Prize winner 1970
