= Charles Mack =

Charles Mack may refer to:

- Charles Mack (performer) (1888–1934), blackface minstrel show performer
- Charles Emmett Mack (1900–1927), American film actor
- Charles Mack (songwriter), Oscar-nominated writer of Raise It Up (August Rush song)
