= Neil Hamilton (actor) =

American actor (1899–1984)

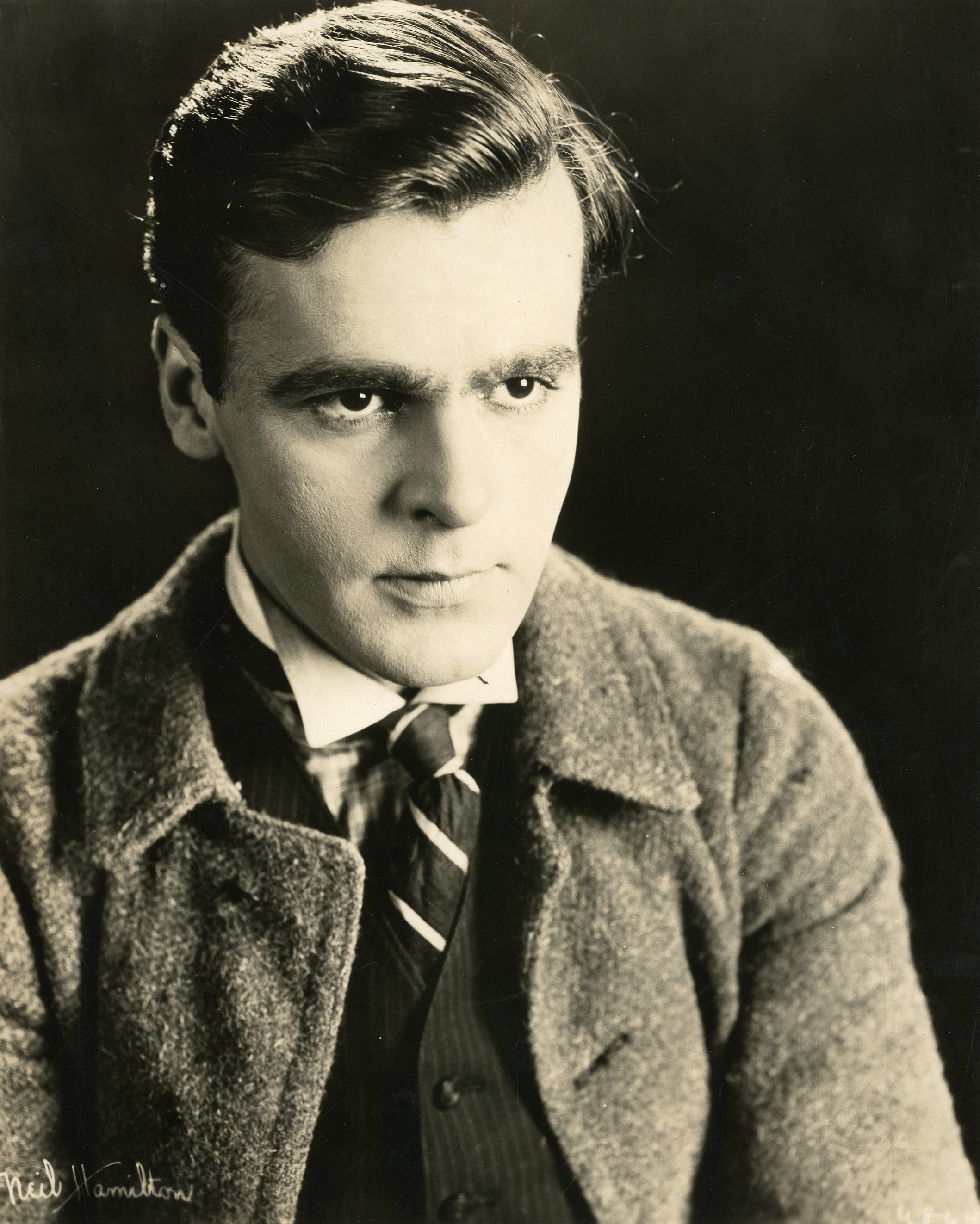
- Hamilton in Isn't Life Wonderful (1924)
- Born: James Neil Hamilton; September 9, 1899; Lynn, Massachusetts, U.S.
- Died: September 24, 1984 (aged 85); Escondido, California, U.S.
- Occupation: Actor
- Years active: 1918–1971
- Spouse: Elsa Whitmer (m. 1922)
- Children: 1
- Relatives: Margaret Hamilton (distant cousin); Dorothy Hamilton Brush (distant cousin)

James Neil Hamilton (September 9, 1899 – September 24, 1984) was an American stage, film and television actor, best remembered for his role as Commissioner Gordon on the Batman TV series of the 1960s. During his motion picture career, which spanned more than a half century, Hamilton performed in over 260 productions. He was a prominent leading man to actresses such as Clara Bow and Joan Crawford in silent and early sound films during the 1920s and early 1930s.

== Acting career ==
An only child, Hamilton was born in Lynn, Massachusetts. His show business career began when he secured a job as a shirt model in magazine advertisements.

After this, he became interested in acting and joined several stock companies, where he gained experience and training as an actor in professional stage productions. This allowed him to get his first film role, in Vitagraph's The Beloved Impostor (1918). He got his big break in D. W. Griffith's The White Rose (1923). He traveled to Germany with Griffith and made a film about the incredibly harsh conditions in Germany after World War I, Isn't Life Wonderful (1924).

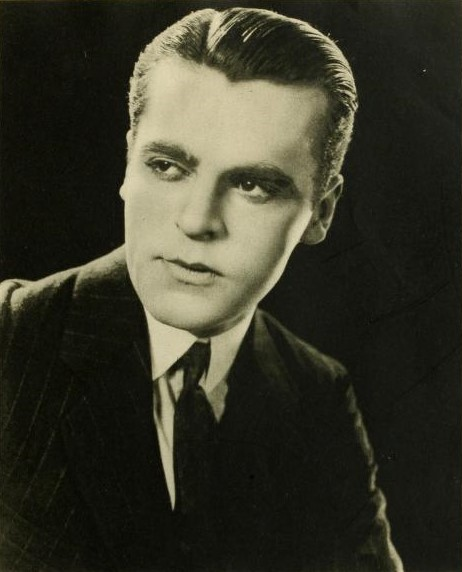
Hamilton in Stars of the Photoplay, 1924

While he was filming America (1924), a soldier's arm was blown off. Actor Charles Emmett Mack recalled: "Neil Hamilton and I went to neighboring towns and raised a fund for him—I doing a song and dance and Neil collecting a coin."

Hamilton was signed by Paramount Pictures in the mid-1920s and became one of its leading men. He often appeared opposite Bebe Daniels. He played one of Ronald Colman's brothers in Paramount's original silent version of Beau Geste (1926) and Nick Carraway in the first film of The Great Gatsby (1926), now a lost film.

He starred with Victor McLaglen in John Ford's Mother Machree (1928), whose title became the catchphrase of Gordon's associate Chief O'Hara (played by Stafford Repp) on the Batman television series almost four decades later. Machree is likely an English representation of the Irish phrase "mo chroí", meaning "my heart", and has identical pronunciation. Also in 1928, he played a character by the name of James Gordon in 1928's Three Week-Ends alongside Clara Bow.

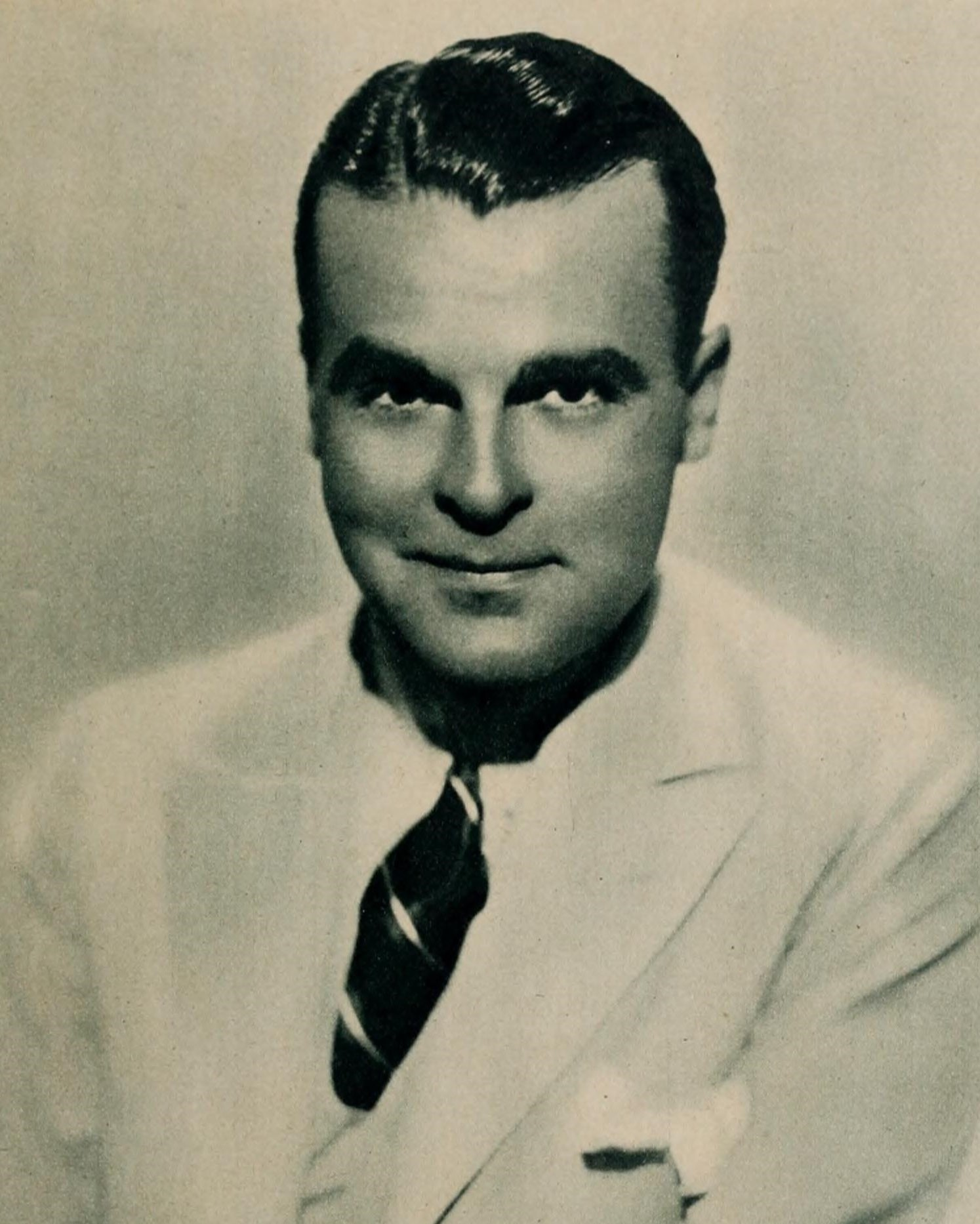
Hamilton in 1930

In 1930, Hamilton appeared in the original production of The Dawn Patrol (retitled "Flight Commander" after its remake), playing the squadron commander, who was played by Basil Rathbone in the 1938 remake. Hamilton was billed above newcomer Clark Gable in Laughing Sinners (1931), in which he played a cad who deserts Joan Crawford's brokenhearted character. He originated the role of milksop Harry Holt, Jane's fiancé, in Tarzan the Ape Man (1932), where he got top billing. Hamilton reprised the role in the pre-Code sequel Tarzan and His Mate (1934) at Metro-Goldwyn-Mayer. He made five films in England in 1936 and 1937.

"A"-level work in Hollywood dried up for Hamilton by the 1940s, and he was reduced to working in serials, "B" films, and other low-budget projects. He starred as the villain in King of the Texas Rangers (1941), one of the Republic Pictures most successful movie serials.

In Since You Went Away (1944), about life on the home front in World War II, Hamilton is seen only in still photographs as a serviceman away at war. His family's travails during his absence are the center of the movie. Hamilton reportedly shot scenes for the movie before filmmakers decided to keep his character off-screen. He appeared in the film noir When Strangers Marry (1944) with Robert Mitchum.

In a 1970s book interview for Whatever Happened to..., Hamilton said he had been banned from A level work for insulting a studio executive. A Roman Catholic, Hamilton said that his faith got him through the difficult period of late 1942 to early 1944 when he could not obtain film employment and was down on his luck financially.

When television came along, Hamilton hosted Hollywood Screen Test (1948-1953), co-starred in the short-lived sitcom That Wonderful Guy with Jack Lemmon (1949–50), at the same time as Hollywood Screen Test, and did guest shots on numerous series of the 1950s and 1960s, such as seven episodes of Perry Mason: in 1958 he played murder victim Bertrand Allred in "The Case of the Lazy Lover" and Grove Dillingham in "The Case of the Drifting Dropout" in 1964. He was in five episodes of 77 Sunset Strip. He appeared on Maverick, Tales of Wells Fargo, The Real McCoys, Mister Ed, Bachelor Father, The Outer Limits, and The Cara Williams Show. During the late 1940s and early 1950s, Hamilton performed on Broadway in Many Happy Returns (1945), The Men We Marry (1948), To Be Continued (1952), and Late Love (1953–54).

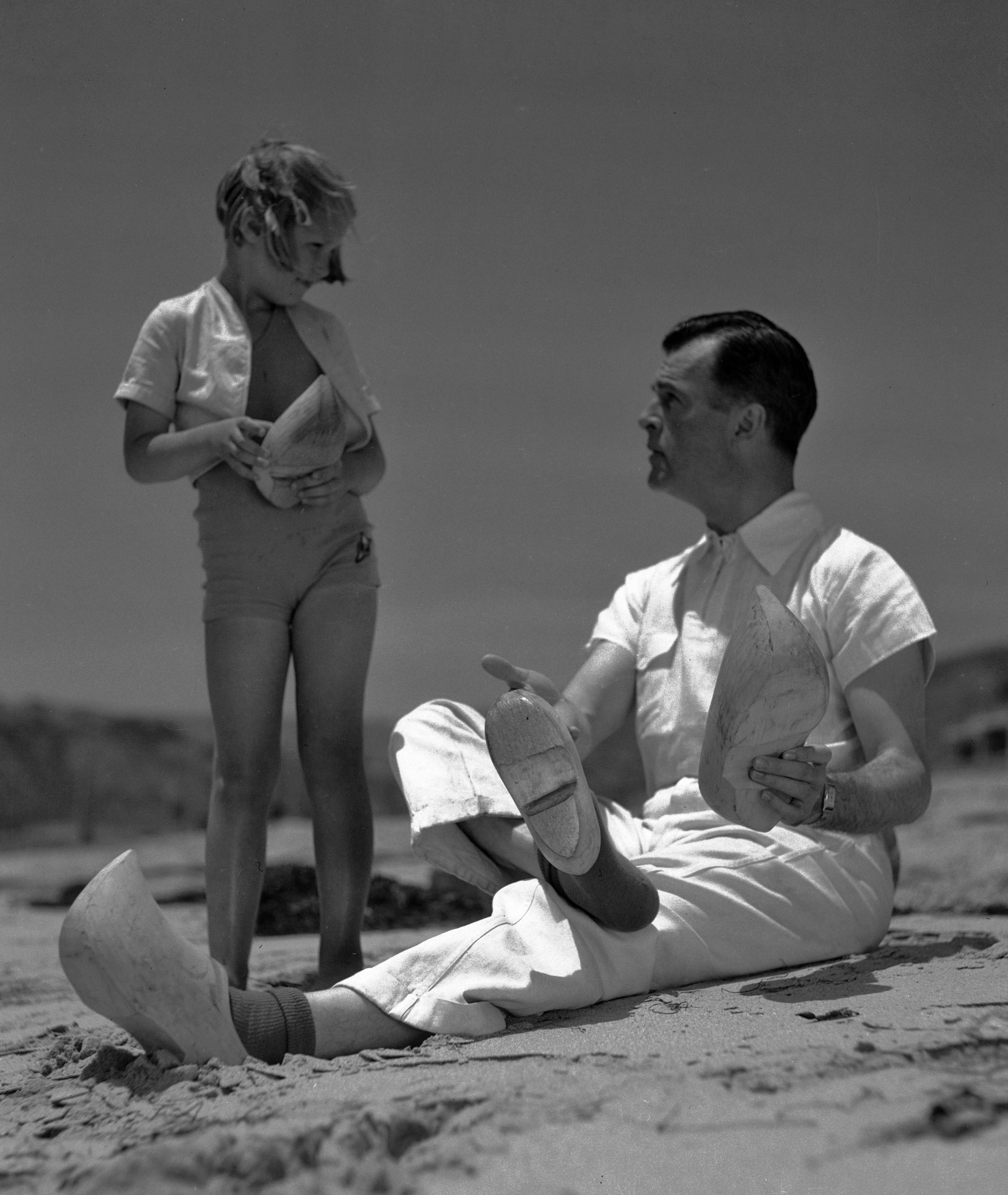
Hamilton and his daughter Patricia on the beach, newspaper photo from 1937

In 1960, actor Richard Cromwell was seeking a comeback of sorts in 20th Century Fox's planned production of The Little Shepherd of Kingdom Come but Cromwell died of complications from liver cancer. Producer Maury Dexter quickly signed Hamilton to replace Cromwell in the film, which co-starred Jimmie Rodgers and Chill Wills. During the 1960s, Hamilton appeared in three Jerry Lewis films: The Patsy (1964), The Family Jewels (1965), and Which Way to the Front? (1970).

Hamilton co-starred in a season-one episode of The Munsters, "Autumn Croakus", as a conman named Malcolm. He also appeared as Police Commissioner James "Jim" Gordon in all 120 episodes of the Batman television series (1966–68) as well as the 1966 film of the same name. Yvonne Craig, who played Commissioner Gordon's daughter Barbara, said Hamilton "came every day to the set letter perfect in dialogue and never missed a beat—a consummate professional."

== Personal life ==
Hamilton was married to Elsa Whitmer from 1922 until his death in September 1984. They had one child.

Hamilton was a Roman Catholic, and a member of the Good Shepherd Parish and the Catholic Motion Picture Guild in Beverly Hills, California.

Hamilton died at the age of 85 on September 24, 1984, in Escondido, California, after suffering a severe asthma attack. After his cremation, his ashes were later scattered into the Pacific Ocean.

== Filmography ==
- The Beloved Impostor (1918)
- The Great Romance (1919)
- The White Rose (1923) as John White
- America (1924) as Nathan Holden
- The Sixth Commandment (1924) as Robert Fields
- The Side Show of Life (1924) as Charles Verity-Stewart
- Isn't Life Wonderful (1924) as Paul
- Men and Women (1925) as Ned Seabury
- The Little French Girl (1925) as Giles Bradley
- The Street of Forgotten Men (1925) as Philip Peyton
- The Golden Princess (1925) as Tennessee Hunter
- New Brooms (1925) as Thomas Bates Jr.
- The Splendid Crime (1925) as Bob Van Dyke
- Desert Gold (1926) as George Thorne
- Beau Geste (1926) as Digby Geste
- The Great Gatsby (1926) as Nick Carraway
- Diplomacy (1926) as Julian Weymouth
- The Music Master (1927) as Beverly Cruger
- Ten Modern Commandments (1927) as Tod Gilbert
- The Joy Girl (1927) as John Jeffrey Fleet
- The Spotlight (1927) as Norman Brooke
- Mother Machree (1928) as Brian
- The Shield of Honor (1928) as Jack MacDowell
- The Showdown (1928) as Wilson Shelton
- Something Always Happens (1928) as Roderick Keswick
- Don't Marry (1928) as Henry Willoughby
- The Grip of the Yukon (1928) as Jack Elliott
- Hot News (1928) as Scoop Morgan
- The Patriot (1928) as Crown Prince Alexander
- Take Me Home (1928) as David North
- Three Week-Ends (1928) as James Gordon
- What a Night! (1928) as Joe Madison
- Why Be Good? (1929) as Winthrop Peabody Jr.
- A Dangerous Woman (1929) as Bobby Gregory
- The Studio Murder Mystery (1929) as Tony White
- The Love Trap (1929) as Paul Harrington
- The Mysterious Dr. Fu Manchu (1929) as Dr. Jack Petrie
- Darkened Rooms (1929) as Emory Jago
- The Kibitzer (1930) as Eddie Brown
- The Return of Dr. Fu Manchu (1930) as Dr. Jack Petrie
- The Dawn Patrol (1930) as Major Brand
- Anybody's War (1930) as Red Reinhardt
- Ladies Must Play (1930) as Anthony Gregg
- The Cat Creeps (1930) as Charles Wilder
- Ex-Flame (1930) as Sir Carlisle Austin
- The Widow From Chicago (1930) as 'Swifty' Dorgan
- Command Performance (1931) as Peter Fedor / Prince Alexis
- Strangers May Kiss (1931) as Alan
- The Spy (1931) as Ivan Turin
- Laughing Sinners (1931) as Howard 'Howdy' Palmer
- The Great Lover (1931) as Carlo
- This Modern Age (1931) as Robert 'Bob' Blake Jr.
- The Sin of Madelon Claudet (1931) as Larry
- The Wet Parade (1932) as Roger Chilcote, Jr.
- Are You Listening? (1932) as Jack Clayton
- Tarzan the Ape Man (1932) as Harry Holt
- The Woman in Room 13 (1932) as Paul Ramsey
- What Price Hollywood? (1932) as Lonny Borden
- Two Against the World (1932) as Mr. David 'Dave' Norton
- The Animal Kingdom (1932) as Owen Fiske
- As the Devil Commands (1932) as Dr. David Graham
- Terror Aboard (1933) as James Cowles
- The World Gone Mad (1933) as Lionel Houston
- The Silk Express (1933) as Donald Kilgore
- As the Devil Commands (1933) as Dr. David Graham
- One Sunday Afternoon (1933) as Hugo Barnstead
- Ladies Must Love (1933) as Bill Langhorne
- Mr. Stringfellow Says No (1934) as Jeremy Stringfellow
- Tarzan and His Mate (1934) as Harry Holt
- Here Comes the Groom (1934) as Jim
- Blind Date (1934) as Bob
- Once to Every Bachelor (1934) as Lyle Stuart
- One Exciting Adventure (1934) as Walter Stone
- Two Heads on a Pillow (1934) as John C. Smith
- By Your Leave (1934) as David McKenzie
- Fugitive Lady (1934) as Donald Brooks
- Mutiny Ahead (1935) as Kent Brewster
- Honeymoon Limited (1935) as Dick Spencer Gordon / Gulliver
- Keeper of the Bees (1935) as James 'Jamie' Lewis McFarland
- The Daring Young Man (1935) as Gerald Raeburn
- Parisian Life (1936) as Jaques
- Southern Roses (1936) as Reggie
- Everything in Life (1936) as Geoffrey Loring
- You Must Get Married (1936) as Michael Brown
- Secret Lives (1937) as Lt. Pierre de Montmalion
- Mr Stringfellow Says No (1937) as Earle Condon
- Lady Behave! (1937) as Stephen Cormack
- Hollywood Stadium Mystery (1938) as Bill Devons
- Army Girl (1938) as Capt. Joe Schuyler
- The Saint Strikes Back (1939) as Allan Breck
- Queen of the Mob (unbilled; 1940) as First FBI Chief
- Federal Fugitives (1941) as Capt. James Madison / Robert Edmunds
- They Meet Again (1941) as Gov. John C. North
- Father Takes a Wife (1941) as Vincent Stewart
- Dangerous Lady (1941) as Duke Martindel
- King of the Texas Rangers (1941) as John Barton
- Look Who's Laughing (1941) as Hilary Horton
- The Lady Is Willing (1942) as Charlie (uncredited)
- Too Many Women (1942) as Richard Sutton
- X Marks the Spot (1942) as John J. Underwood
- Secrets of the Underground (1942) as Harry Kermit
- Bombardier (1943) as Colonel (uncredited)
- All by Myself (1943) as Mark Turner
- The Sky's the Limit (1943) as Navy Officer on Train (uncredited)
- When Strangers Marry (1944) as Lieutenant Blake
- Brewster's Millions (1945) as Mr. Grant
- Murder in Villa Capri (1955) as Police Capt. Brady
- Perry Mason (1959) as Frank Livesey
- The Little Shepherd of Kingdom Come (1961) as Gen. Dean
- The Devil's Hand (1962) as Francis Lamont
- Perry Mason (1963) as Fred McCormick in "Season 6, Episode 16: "The Case of the Constant Doyle"
- Good Neighbor Sam (1964) as Larry Boling
- Perry Mason (1964) as Grove Dillingham in "Season 7, Episode 28": "The Case of the Drifting Dropout"
- The Patsy (1964) as The Barber
- The Outer Limits (1964), 2 episodes playing different characters.
- The Family Jewels (1965) as Attorney
- Madame X (1966) as Scott Lewis (uncredited)
- Batman (1966) as Commissioner Gordon
- Strategy of Terror (1969) as Mr. Harkin
- Which Way to the Front? (1970) as Chief of Staff
