= Hot News =

1928 film directed by Clarence Badger

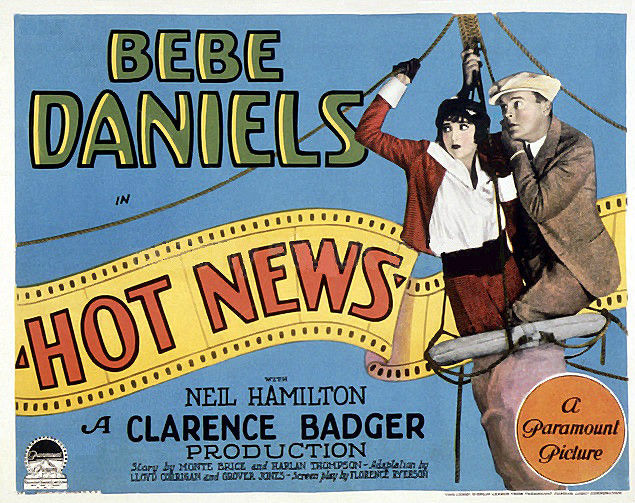
- Lobby card
- Directed by: Clarence Badger
- Written by: Monte Brice; Lloyd Corrigan; Grover Jones; George Marion, Jr. Florence Ryerson
- Story by: Harlan Thompson
- Produced by: Adolph Zukor; Jesse L. Lasky
- Starring: Bebe Daniels; Neil Hamilton
- Cinematography: William Marshall; Loyal Griggs (operator)
- Edited by: Tay Malarkey
- Distributed by: Paramount Pictures
- Release date: July 14, 1928
- Running time: 70 minutes
- Country: United States
- Language: Silent (English intertitles)

Hot News is a 1928 American silent comedy film produced and distributed by Paramount Famous Lasky Corporation, an amalgamation of Famous Players–Lasky and Paramount Pictures. Clarence Badger directed and Bebe Daniels starred.

== Cast ==
- Bebe Daniels as Pat Clancy
- Neil Hamilton as Scoop Morgan
- Paul Lukas as James Clayton
- Alfred Allen as Michael Clancy
- Spec O'Donnell as Spec
- Ben Hall as Benny
- Mario Carillo as Maharajah
- Maude Turner Gordon as Mrs. Van Vleck
- Guy Oliver as uncredited

== Preservation status ==
The film is now considered lost.
