= Betty Farrington =

American actress (1898–1989)

- Born: May 14, 1898; Kansas City, Missouri, United States
- Died: February 3, 1989 (aged 90); San Diego, California, United States
- Occupation: Actress
- Years active: 1929–1956

Betty Farrington (May 14, 1898 – February 3, 1989) was an American character actress active from the 1920s through 1960.

== Career overview ==
Born in Kansas City, Missouri, Betty Farrington played mostly supporting and minor roles during her career, although she occasionally was given a featured or leading part, appearing in almost 100 films during her career. Some of the more notable films she appeared in include: Preston Sturges' The Lady Eve (1941), starring Barbara Stanwyck and Henry Fonda; 1942's My Favorite Blonde and 1947's My Favorite Brunette, both starring Bob Hope; the classic film noir Double Indemnity (1944), starring Fred MacMurray, Stanwyck, and Edward G. Robinson; 1944's The Uninvited, starring Ray Milland and Ruth Hussey; Cecil B. Demille's Unconquered (1948), starring Gary Cooper and Paulette Goddard; the epic Samson and Delilah (1950), with Victor Mature and Hedy Lamarr in the title roles; Father of the Bride (1950), directed by Vincente Minnelli, and starring Spencer Tracy, Joan Bennett, and Elizabeth Taylor; and Minnelli's 1953 The Band Wagon, starring Fred Astaire and Cyd Charisse. Her final big screen appearance was in 1956's The Fastest Gun Alive, starring Glenn Ford. Farrington made guest appearances on several television shows in the late 1950s, including Sergeant Preston of the Yukon and Perry Mason. She died in San Diego at age 90.

== Filmography ==
(Per AFI database)

- The Fall of Eve (1929)
- Anybody's War (1930)
- Man Wanted (1932)
- Down to Their Last Yacht (1934)
- She Made Her Bed (1934)
- Friends of Mr. Sweeney (1934)
- Merry Wives of Reno (1934)
- Helldorado (1934)
- One Hour Late (1934)
- The Florentine Dagger (1935)
- Bad Boy (1935)
- Maybe It's Love (1935)
- Metropolitan (1935)
- Under Pressure (1935)
- Grand Exit (1935)
- The King Steps Out (1936)
- The Trail of the Lonesome Pine (1936)
- The Moon's Our Home (1936)
- Florida Special (1936)
- The Man Who Lived Twice (1936)
- The Music Goes 'Round (1936)
- Theodora Goes Wild (1936)
- That I May Live (1937)
- Life Begins with Love (1937)
- Missing Witnesses (1937)
- Racketeers in Exile (1937)
- Hollywood Hotel (1938)
- Accidents Will Happen (1938)
- Made for Each Other (1939)
- Let Us Live (1939)
- Joe and Ethel Turp Call on the President (1939)
- Four Wives (1939)
- Our Neighbors-the Carters (1939)
- The Great McGinty (1940)
- Money and the Woman (1940)
- Birth of the Blues (1941)
- Dr. Kildare's Wedding Day (1941)
- Footsteps in the Dark (1941)
- Life with Henry
- Mr. District Attorney in the Carter Case (1941)
- Pacific Blackout (1941)
- The Saint in Palm Springs (1941)
- The Trial of Mary Dugan (1941)
- Whistling in the Dark (1941)
- The Wild Man of Borneo (1941) (uncredited)
- The Lady Eve (1941)
- Shadows on the Sage (1942)
- Home in Wyomin' (1942)
- Ice-Capades Revue (1942)
- Mrs. Wiggs of the Cabbage Patch (1942)
- My Favorite Blonde (1942)
- My Heart Belongs to Daddy (1942)
- Night in New Orleans (1942)
- Stardust on the Sage (1942)
- Take a Letter, Darling (1942)
- This Gun for Hire (1942)
- Henry Aldrich Gets Glamour (1943)
- Mountain Rhythm (1943)
- Slightly Dangerous (1943)
- Thank Your Lucky Stars (1943)
- True to Life (1943)
- Young and Willing (1943)
- The Hitler Gang (1944)
- Henry Aldrich's Little Secret (1944)
- Henry Aldrich Plays Cupid (1944)
- Double Indemnity (1944)
- The National Barn Dance (1944)
- Our Hearts Were Young and Gay (1944)
- The Sullivans (1944)
- The Uninvited (1944)
- And Now Tomorrow (1944)
- The Dolly Sisters (1945)
- Duffy's Tavern (1945)
- George White's Scandals (1945)
- Out of This World (1945)
- You Came Along (1945)
- Miss Susie Slagle's (1946)
- Nocturne (1946)
- To Each His Own (1946)
- The Virginian (1946)
- California (1947)
- Driftwood (1947)
- Hit Parade of 1947 (1947)
- My Favorite Brunette (1947)
- Unconquered (1948)
- Samson and Delilah (1950)
- Dial 1119 (1950)
- Father of the Bride (1950)
- Two Weeks with Love (1950)
- The Law and the Lady (1951)
- Too Young to Kiss (1951)
- The Girl in White (1952)
- The Fabulous Senorita (1952)
- The Band Wagon (1953)
- Sweethearts on Parade (1953)
- Men of the Fighting Lady (1954)
- The Student Prince (1954)
- The Fastest Gun Alive (1956) - Grace Fenwick (uncredited)

== Same-named actress from an earlier generation ==
A stage actress named Betty Farrington was active during the late 19th and early 20th century and is described in a September 1914 Reading Eagle article as having "planned to retire this winter and spend the season at her home in Washington", but will instead appear "at the Grand Theatre [in Reading] on Monday evening, Sept. 14, in the leading role of the great American comedy drama, 'The Girl from Out Yonder'". The article subsequently states that, "she was the leading woman for the Orpheum Players during the latter part of the season of 1913–1914. Born in Middletown, Miss Farrington is distinctly a Pennsylvania girl". A later paragraph begins with the words, "[H]er relatives and friends in Reading have always followed her work closely…"

There is no indication that the two Betty Farringtons were related, although the write-up in the IMDb for the film actress, a native of Kansas City, Missouri, who was 16 years old in 1914, states that "[S]he had formerly been with various stock companies and was a leading performer on the Orpheum vaudeville circuit in the 1910s".
