= Al G. Field =

Minstrel show operator

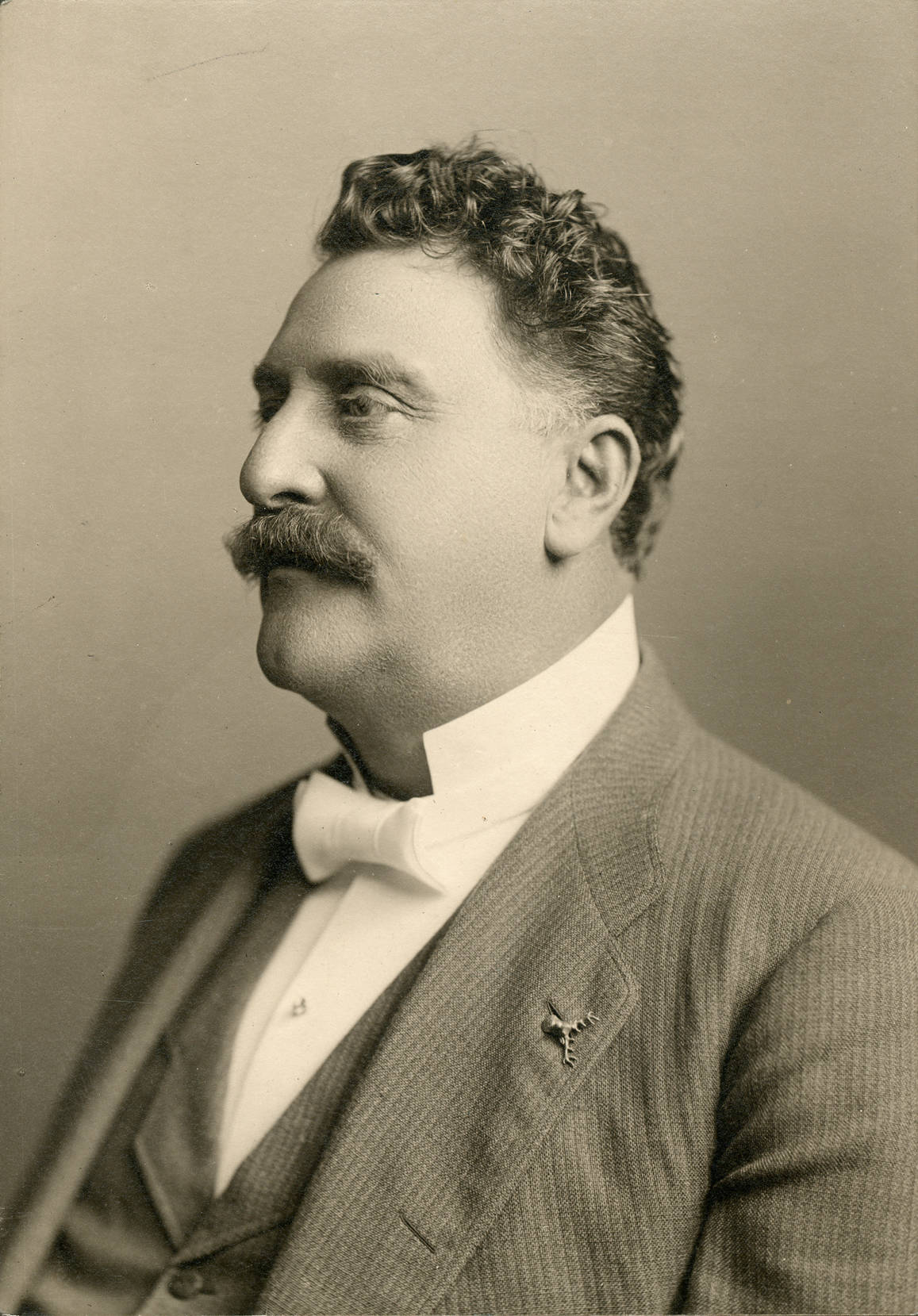
- Hatfield in 1904
- Born: Alfred Griffin Hatfield; November 7, 1848; Leesburg, Virginia, US
- Died: April 3, 1921 (aged 72); Columbus, Ohio, US
- Burial place: Green Lawn Cemetery

Alfred Griffin (or Griffith) Hatfield (November 7, 1848 or 1850 – April 3, 1921) was a performer and minstrel show producer as Al G. Field and sometimes Al G. Fields.

== Biography ==
He was born in Leesburg, Virginia near Morgantown, West Virginia on November 7, 1848 or 1850, as Alfred Griffin Hatfield or Alfred Griffith Hatfield. He had a brother Joseph E. Hatfield.

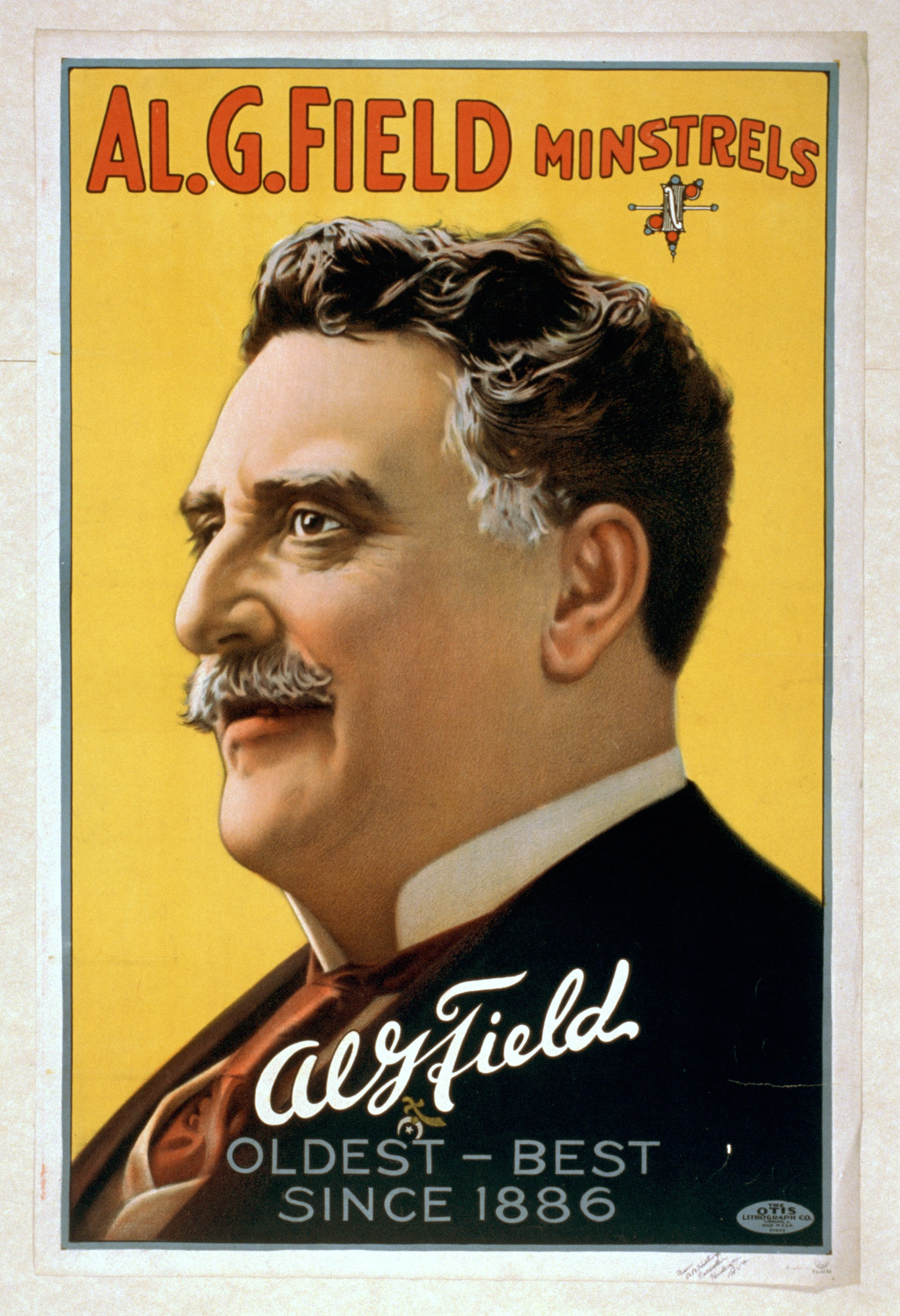
Poster

Beginning in 1875 he performed with the Sells Brothers Circus that was based out of Columbus, Ohio. In 1884 he organized the Hagenbeck-Wallace Circus in Peru, Indiana. He managed them until September 9, 1886. He launched his own namesake minstrel show the same year. His autobiography Watch Yourself Go By was published in 1912. He changed his name and established his own company in 1886. He eventually retreated to a farm and bred animals.

He died on April 3, 1921, in Columbus, Ohio from Bright's Disease. He was buried in Green Lawn Cemetery in Columbus, Ohio. His last will and testament arranged for his minstrel show to be bequeathed to his brother, Joseph E. Hatfield, and to Edward Conard, a relative. His estate was valued at $150,000 (equivalent to $2,707,556 in 2025) and he requested that the minstrel show continue to be operated.

== Performers ==
- Bert Swor (1871-1931) from 1911 to 1931.
- Billy Church (?-1942).
- Dan White (actor) (1922-1930) Tampa, Florida
- John Leipold, music director from circa 1922-1926

== Shows ==
- Darkest America, first staged in 1896
