= Tay Malarkey =

American film editor

- Born: Theresa Malarkey; March 5, 1889; Girardville, Pennsylvania, USA
- Died: April 15, 1973 (aged 84); Culver City, Los Angeles County, California, USA
- Occupation: Film editor

Theresa "Tay" Malarkey (1889-1973) was an American film editor who worked at Triangle and Famous Players–Lasky in the late 1920s and early 1930s.

== Biography ==
Tay was born in Girardville, Pennsylvania, to John Malarkey and Mary Joyce, both of whom were Irish immigrants. She was the youngest of the couple's nine children.

After working as a stenographer in the real estate industry in San Antonio in her teens, she moved to Hollywood and took on a similar role at a film studio. Eventually she worked her way into an editing role.

Malarkey—who never married—died on April 15, 1973.

== Selected filmography ==
- No Limit (1931)
- Close Harmony (1929)
- Three Week Ends (1928)
- Hot News (1928)
