= Hypnotized (1932 film) =

1932 film

- Directed by: Mack Sennett
- Written by: Felix Adler; Lewis R. Foster; Mack Sennett
- Produced by: Mack Sennett
- Distributed by: Sono Art-World Wide Pictures
- Release date: December 25, 1932
- Running time: 70 minutes
- Country: United States
- Language: English

Hypnotized is a 1932 American comedy film directed by Mack Sennett.

== Plot ==
A group of circus performers are on a transatlantic crossing, including a prize ticket winner being hoodwinked by a crooked hypnotist and his attempts to recover the winning ticket.

== Production ==
In 1932 Mack Sennett attempted to re-enter the feature-film market on a grand scale with Hypnotized. Remembering the successful campaign for his very first feature-length comedy Tillie's Punctured Romance, which in 1914 was the longest comedy film ever produced, Sennett planned Hypnotized along similar lines as an epic production that would be shown first-run in select roadshow engagements. Sennett announced that Hypnotized would run 15 reels, or two-and-a-half hours, more than twice the length of a typical comedy feature of the day. On February 20, 1932, Hollywood Citizen News reported that Sennett had been working on the script for Hypnotized since June 1931. Up to 20 writers had collaborated with him, and the report estimated that $100,000 (approximately $2.2 million in 2024) had already been invested in the production. Sennett wanted W. C. Fields to star as a carnival hypnotist, but Fields declined and the role went to Ernest Torrence, sharing the spotlight with blackface comedians Moran and Mack, "The Two Black Crows". Production was completed in August 1932, but fell far short of Sennett's grandiose predictions; the finished film ran an ordinary 70 minutes and was released through ordinary channels by World Wide Pictures (the feature-film outlet for Sennett's short-subject distributor, Educational Pictures) in December 1932.

== Cast ==
- Charles Murray as Charlie O'Brien
- Ernest Torrence as Prof. Horace S. Limberly, hypnotist
- George Moran and Charles Mack as the "Two Black Crows", blackface minstrel performers
- Wallace Ford, as Bill Bogard, the prize ticket winner
- Maria Alba as Princess Mitzi
- Marjorie Beebe as Pearl, the maid
- Herman Bing as Capt. Otto Von Stormberg
- Matt McHugh as Drummer
- Luis Alberni as Hungarian Consul
- Mitchell Harris as circus ringmaster
- Nona Mozelle as the captain's girl friend
- Alexander Carr as Abe Shapiro
- Harry Schultz as Ludwig, first mate
