= Close Harmony (1929 film) =

1929 film

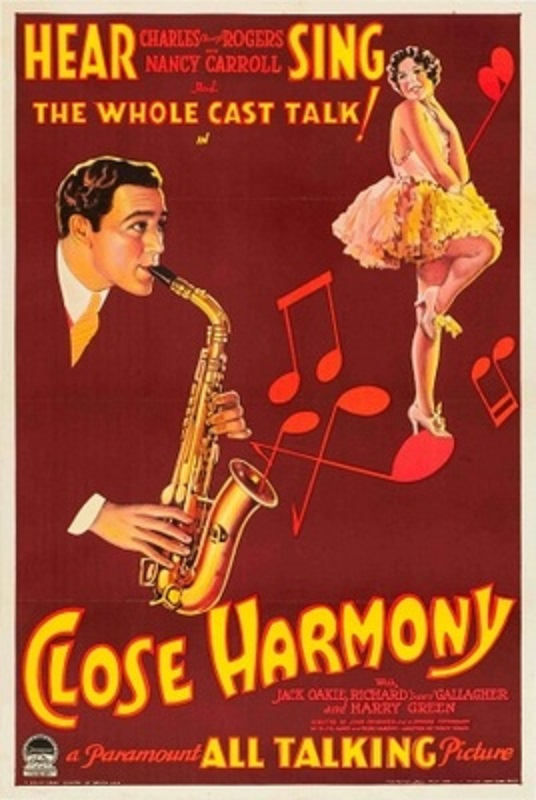
- Theatrical Poster
- Directed by: John Cromwell; A. Edward Sutherland
- Written by: Story: Elsie Janis; Gene Markey; Screenplay: Percy Heath; John V.A. Weaver
- Starring: Charles "Buddy" Rogers; Nancy Carroll; Harry Green; Jack Oakie; Richard "Skeets" Gallagher
- Cinematography: J. Roy Hunt
- Edited by: Tay Malarkey
- Music by: John Leipold; Richard A. Whiting; Leo Robin
- Production company: Paramount Pictures
- Distributed by: Paramount Pictures
- Release date: April 13, 1929
- Running time: 70 minutes
- Country: United States
- Language: English

Close Harmony is a 1929 American pre-Code comedy-drama musical film released by Paramount Pictures. The script by Percy Heath and John Van Alstyne Weaver was adapted from a story by Elsie Janis and Gene Markey.

== Plot ==
Excerpt of the film

A musically talented young woman named Marjorie who is part of a stage show, meets a warehouse clerk named Al West who has put together an unusual jazz band. She becomes interested in him and his work and so manages to use her influence to get him into the program for one of the shows at her theatre company.

The manager, Max Mindel has a dislike towards Marjorie so after discovering her affection towards Al, he gives the band notice and hires harmony singers Barney and Bey as a replacement. Marjorie makes up to both men and soon breaks up the duo, getting rid of the competition. Al learns of her scheme, and makes her confess to the singers of her deeds. Barney and Bey make up, and Max gives Al and his band one more chance. Al is a sensation, and Max offers him a contract for $1,000 a week.

== Cast ==
- Charles "Buddy" Rogers – Al West
- Nancy Carroll – Marjorie Merwin
- Harry Green – Max Mindel
- Jack Oakie – Ben Barney
- Richard "Skeets" Gallagher – Johnny Bay
- Matty Roubert – Bert
- Ricca Allen – Mrs. Prosser
- Wade Boteler – Officer Kelly
- Oscar Smith – George Washington Brown
- Greta Granstedt – Eva Larue
- Gusztáv Pártos – Gustav (as Gus Partos)
- Jesse Stafford – Himself (orchestra leader)
- Tom Jefferson – Warehouse door tender

== Soundtrack ==
- "She's So, I Dunno"

Words by Leo Robin
Music by Richard A. Whiting

- "I Wanna Go Places and Do Things"

Words by Leo Robin
Music by Richard A. Whiting
Copyright 1929 by Famous Music Corp.

- "I'm All A-Twitter And All A-Twirl"

Words by Leo Robin
Music by Richard A. Whiting
Copyright 1929 by Famous Music Corp.

- "12th Street Rag"

by Euday L. Bowman
Copyright 1919 by J.W. Jenkins Sons Music Co.

== See also ==
- List of early sound feature films (1926–1929)
