= Three Week-Ends =

1928 film directed by Clarence G. Badger

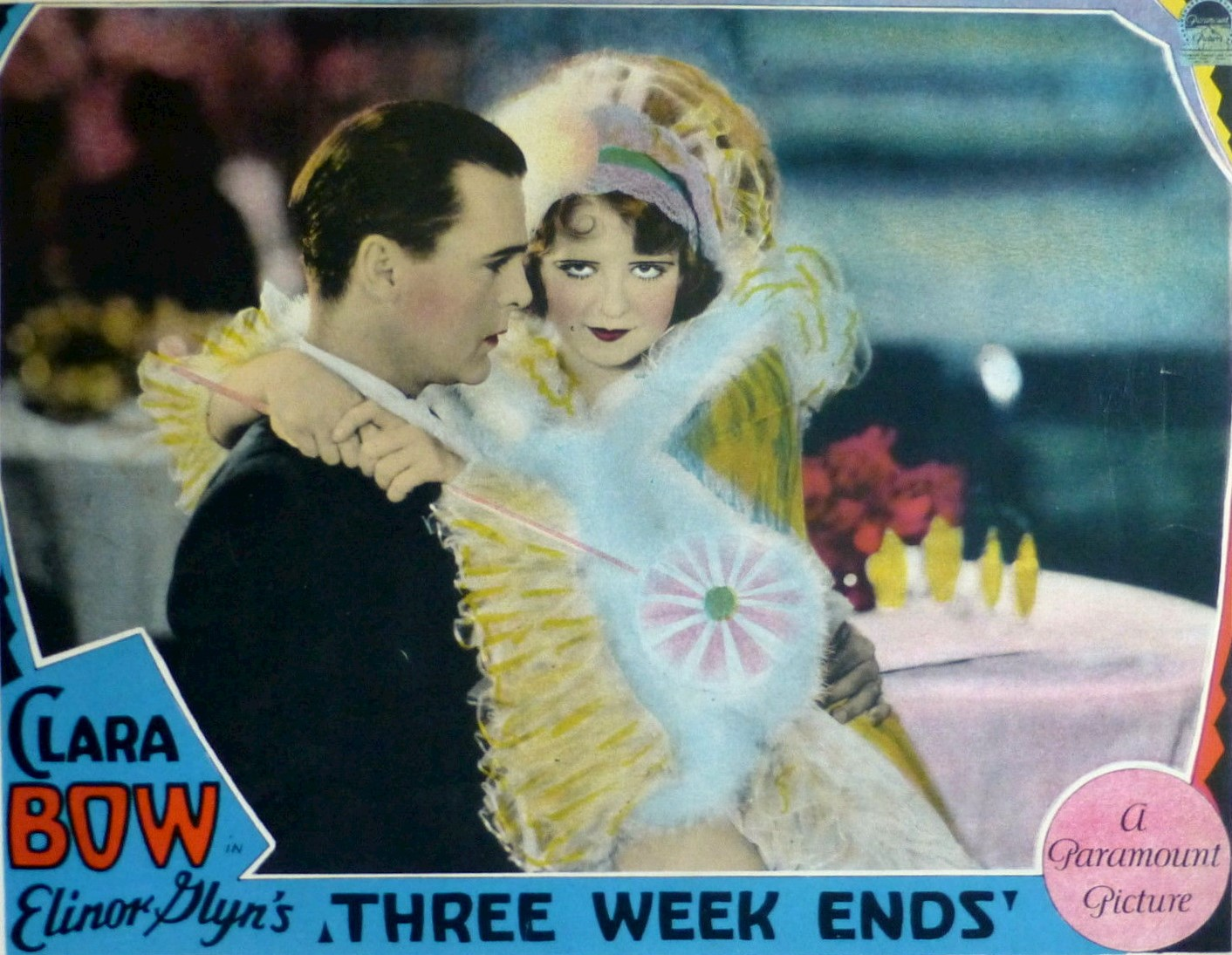
- lobby card
- Directed by: Clarence G. Badger
- Written by: Adaptation: John Farrow; Titles: Paul Perez; Herman J. Mankiewicz
- Screenplay by: Louise Long; Percy Heath; Sam Mintz
- Story by: Elinor Glynn
- Starring: Clara Bow; Neil Hamilton
- Cinematography: Harold Rosson
- Edited by: Tay Malarkey
- Production company: Paramount Famous Lasky Corp.
- Distributed by: Paramount Famous Lasky Corp.
- Release date: December 8, 1928 (NYC)
- Running time: 60 minutes
- Country: United States
- Language: English

Three Week-Ends is a 1928 American comedy drama film directed by Clarence G. Badger and starring Clara Bow and Neil Hamilton. It is believed lost. "Three Week-Ends" is the title given in the AFI Catalog of Feature Films, with alternate titles being "Three Week Ends" and "3 Weekends".

Hamilton, who starred in the film as James Gordon, would go on to portray another character by that name in the Batman TV series of the 1960s and resulting film.

== Plot ==
Gladys O'Brien, a chorus girl, sees James Gordon driving an expensive custom-built automobile and assumes that he is a millionaire playboy, so she sets her sights on him. In reality, James is only an badly-paid insurance salesman who was driving his boss's car to do an errand. James is trying to sell an insurance policy to Turner, a real Broadway playboy. Meanwhile, Gladys has caught Turner's eye, and he invites her to a weekend party at his country house. Gladys accepts, hoping that she can persuade him to sign the insurance policy. When Gladys disrobes to take a swim, Turner hides her clothing and starts to make a move on her, but James turns up uninvited and punches Turner in the nose. Gladys and James return to the city, and James confesses that he is not a rich man, but instead very poor. His situation worsens when he is fired for having punched Turner. Gladys uses her womanly charms to get James re-hired, and coerces Turner into signing the insurance policy. When James sees Turner and Gladys together, he suspects they are having a fling, but his suspicions are soon dispelled and the happy couple make wedding plans.

== Cast ==
- Clara Bow as Gladys O'Brien
- Neil Hamilton as James Gordon
- Harrison Ford as Turner
- Lucille Powers as Miss Witherspoon
- Julia Swayne Gordon as Mrs. Witherspoon
- Jack Raymond as Turners Secretary
- Edythe Chapman as Ma O'Brien
- Guy Oliver as Pa O'Brien
- William Holden as Carter

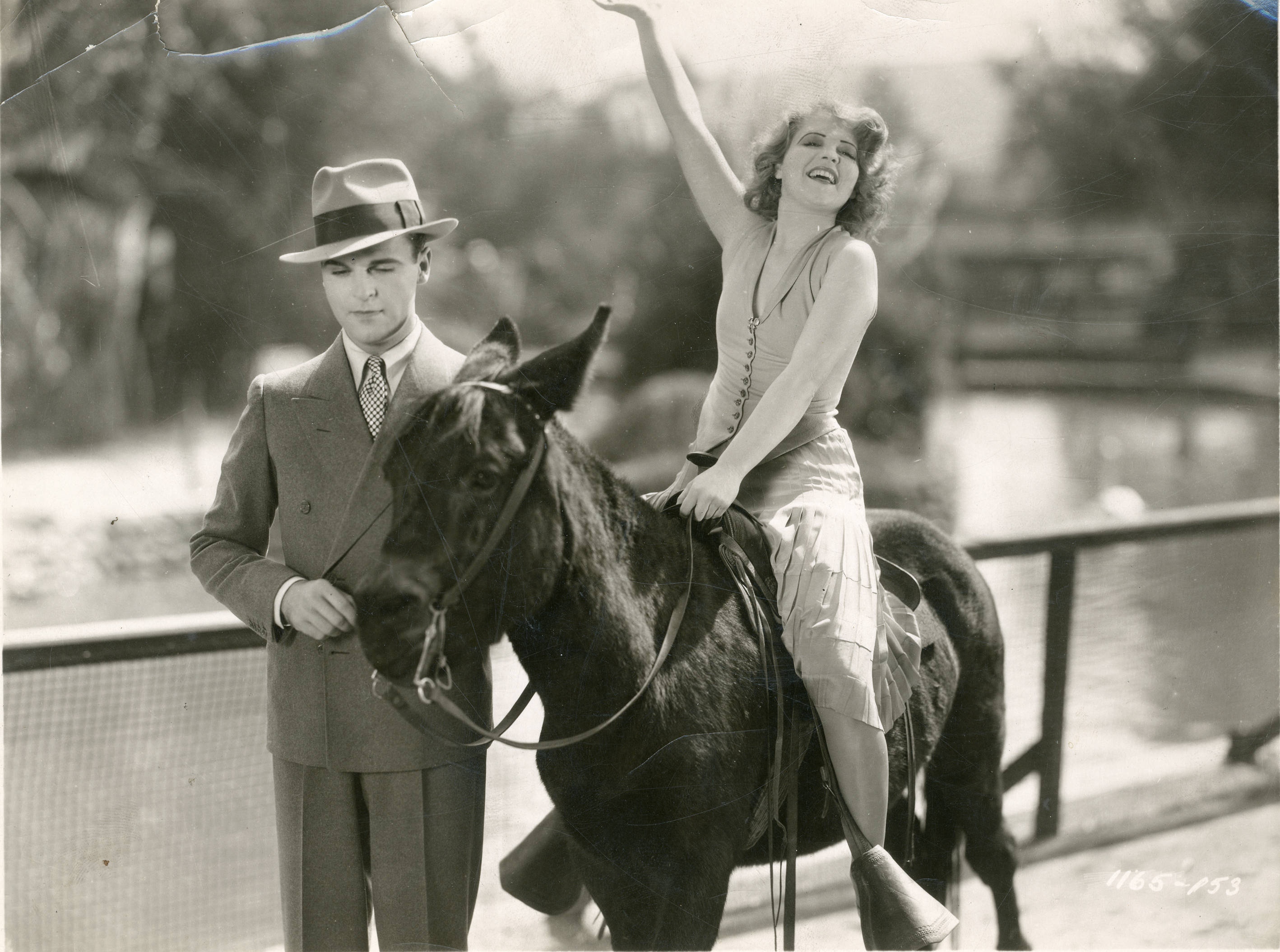
Scene from the movie

== Production ==
Three Week-Ends was the third Elinor Glyn script which starred Clara Bow, after 1927's It – which earned Bow her sobriquet, "The It Girl" – and Red Hair (1928). Glyn was a British novelist who specialized in romantic fiction, who moved to Hollywood to work in films as a writer, producer and director, based on the response to It.

English actor William Austin was originally set to co-star in the film but did not remain with the project. Principal photography during the week of September 22, 1928 at Paramount Famous Lasky's studio on Marathon Street in Hollywood. Although Variety reported that four sound sequences were shot, featuring dances by choreographers Fanchon & Marco, who also designed the sets for those scenes, the fim was released as a silent, with no sound sequences. Shooting wrapped some time in October 1928.

== Release ==
Before the film's general release on December 8, 1928, with a premiere in New York City, it was screened for President Herbert Hoover in November on board the U.S.S. Maryland.

== Preservation status ==
Three Week-Ends is considered a lost film, with only fragments surviving in the UCLA Film and Television Archive. It was added to the list of Lost U. S. Silent Feature Films maintained by the National Film Preservation Board (NFPB) in October 2019.
