= My Little Chickadee =

1940 film by Edward F. Cline

- Directed by: Edward F. Cline
- Written by: Mae West; W. C. Fields
- Produced by: Lester Cowan
- Starring: Mae West; W. C. Fields
- Cinematography: Joseph A. Valentine
- Edited by: Edward Curtiss
- Music by: Frank Skinner
- Distributed by: Universal Pictures
- Release date: February 9, 1940
- Running time: 84 minutes
- Country: United States
- Budget: $625,000
- Box office: $2 million

My Little Chickadee is a 1940 American comedy-western film starring Mae West and W. C. Fields, featuring Joseph Calleia, Ruth Donnelly, Margaret Hamilton, Donald Meek, Willard Robertson, Dick Foran, William B. Davidson, and Addison Richards, and released by Universal Pictures. It was directed by Edward F. Cline and the music was written by Ben Oakland (song "Willie of the Valley") and Frank Skinner.

West reportedly wrote the original screenplay, with Fields contributing one extended scene set in a bar. Universal decided to give the stars equal screenplay credit, perhaps to avoid the appearance of favoritism, but the move incensed West, who declined to team with Fields afterwards. The stars spoofed themselves and the Western genre, with West providing a series of her trademark double entendres.

== Plot ==
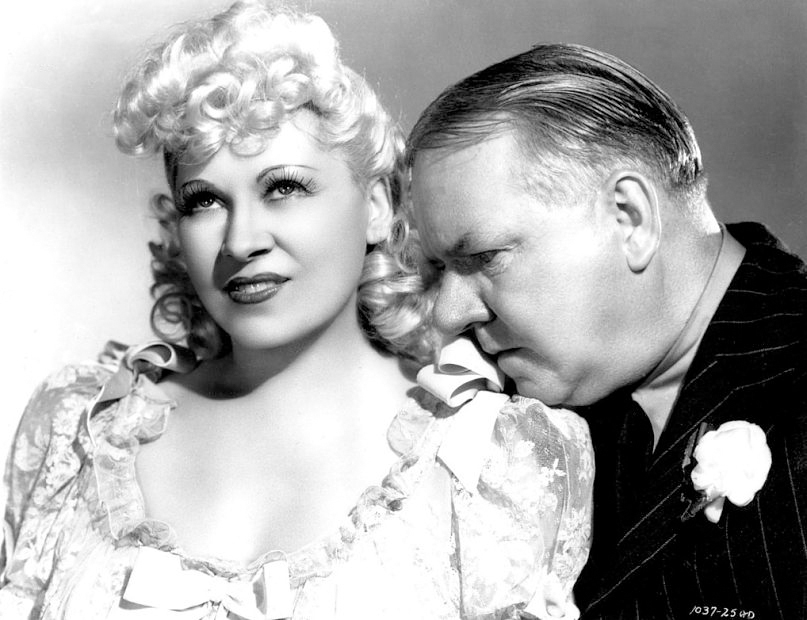
Mae West and W. C. Fields in My Little Chickadee

In the American Old West of the 1880s, Miss Flower Belle Lee, a singer from Chicago, is on her way to visit relatives. While she is traveling on a stagecoach with three men and a woman named Mrs. Gideon, the town gossip and busybody, a masked bandit on horseback holds up the stage for its shipment of gold and orders the passengers to step out.

The masked bandit immediately takes an interest in the saucy blonde. As he makes his getaway with the gold, he takes her with him. Upon reaching the town of Little Bend, the others report the robbery and kidnapping to the sheriff. Flower Belle then walks into town, unharmed, and explains, "I was in a tight spot but I managed to wiggle out of it."

Later that evening, at the home of her Aunt Lou and Uncle John, the masked bandit enters Flower Belle's second floor bedroom and they start kissing. However, his presence and departure is witnessed by Mrs. Gideon. She quickly reports what she has seen and Flower Belle is annoyed to find herself hauled up before the judge. Offended by her indifferent manner, the judge asks angrily "Young lady, are you trying to show contempt for this court?" She answers: "No, I'm doing my best to hide it!" Flower Belle is then run out of Little Bend.

She boards a train to Greasewood City. It makes an unscheduled stop to pick up con-man Cuthbert J. Twillie. When hostile Indians attack, Flower Belle saunters to a window and mows them down with two pistols, while Twillie dodges flying arrows and fights off the Indians with a child's slingshot. Flower Belle has little use for Twillie until she sees a stash of money in his bag. Believing him to be rich, she then plays up to him and they get acquainted. They have an impromptu wedding, officiated over by a passenger, Amos Budge, a gambler who looks like a minister.

As she has only pretended to marry Twillie for "respectability", Flower Belle gets a separate hotel room in Greasewood City. Meanwhile, Twillie is made sheriff by the saloon owner and town boss Jeff Badger, who has an ulterior motive: he hopes the new sheriff, who is clearly incompetent, will be unable to interfere with Badger's crimes. Flower Belle attracts the attention of Badger, newspaper editor Wayne Carter, and every other man in town. While keeping her troublesome "husband" out of reach and out of trouble, Flower Belle encounters the masked bandit again. Twillie attempts to consummate his "marriage" with Flower Belle, but she escapes and leaves a goat in their bed. Twillie, unaware of the substitution, attempts to make love to the goat, and is surprised when he discovers that it is not his wife.

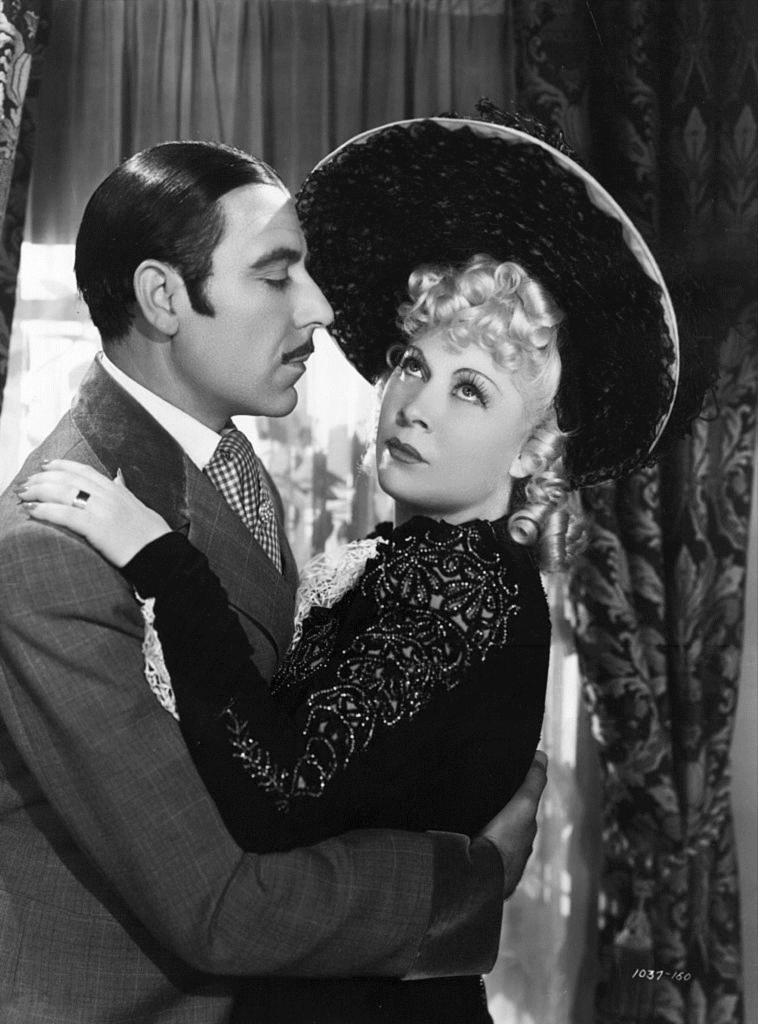
Joseph Calleia and Mae West in My Little Chickadee

One night, Twillie again attempts to consummate his "marriage" by entering Flower Belle's room disguised as the masked bandit. He is caught and accused of being the masked bandit while Flower Belle is also arrested. She finds a way around tricking the jailer that sees her escape the jail. With the noose around Twillie's neck, he makes his last request to the lynching party: "I'd like to see Paris before I die. Philadelphia will do!". Flower Belle encounters Badger, and recognizes that Badger is the masked bandit, musing: "A man's kiss is like his signature." Flower Belle comes up with a quick plan to help save Twillie by showing the actual bandit's presence and even lending the town bags of gold. Twillie soon departs to head out east with Flower Belle plays around with making a decision between Carter and Badger.

== Cast ==
- Mae West as Flower Belle Lee
- W. C. Fields as Cuthbert J. Twillie
- Joseph Calleia as Jeff Badger/Masked Bandit
- Dick Foran as Wayne Carter
- Margaret Hamilton as Mrs. Gideon
- Donald Meek as Amos Budge
- Ruth Donnelly as Aunt Lou
- Willard Robertson as Uncle John
- Fuzzy Knight as Cousin Zeb
- George Moran as Milton, a Native American
- Anne Nagel as Miss Foster, teacher
- William B. Davidson as Sheriff
- Addison Richards as Judge
- Fay Adler as Mrs. "Pygmy" Allen
- Jimmy Conlin as bartender
- William "Billy" Benedict as Lem, pupil
- Gene Austin as Saloon Musician
- Hank Bell as Townsman (uncredited)
- Bill Wolfe as Saloon Patron (uncredited)

== Production notes ==
The film's trailer

Shooting on My Little Chickadee was completed in January 1940. West and Fields received joint screenplay credit. However, West later claimed that she wrote most of the film and that Fields only wrote some of the scenes, such as the bar scene, and some dialogue and was given joint credit as an inducement to "straighten himself up and finish the picture". The film was heavily censored, with many scenes and lines of dialogue ordered to be cut or altered. It opened just one month later and became Fields's highest-grossing film for Universal. Reportedly, West and Fields did not like each other, and would not speak to each other except during filming. Reviews were mixed, but Fields’s performance was praised across the board, while West's was criticized. She was so furious that she refused to work with Fields ever again or even to talk to him or about him.

Fields had starred in a series of comedies for Paramount in the 1930s. My Little Chickadee was West's first screen performance since Every Day's a Holiday (1937) for Paramount Pictures. This was Fields's second film for Universal, and West's only film for Universal. It was also the last successful film of West's career; her three subsequent films all failed at the box office.

My Little Chickadee was the third of five films starring Fields and directed by Edward F. Cline, an ex-Keystone Cop. The others were Million Dollar Legs (1932), You Can't Cheat an Honest Man (1939), The Bank Dick (1940), and Never Give a Sucker an Even Break (1941).

The railroad scenes were filmed on the Sierra Railroad in Tuolumne County, California.

== Reception ==
On Rotten Tomatoes, the film has an aggregate score of 93% based on 13 positive and 1 negative review. Frank S. Nugent reviewed the film negatively for The New York Times, writing that "the film is at low tide most of the time in the quality of its humor, in the broad treatment its players and directors have given it, in the caliber of the audience it seems intended to please and in the generally bad odor it exudes." Variety wrote that the film "has its sagging moments, and the slim basic story cannot be taken seriously at any point. But there's sufficient broad humor and elemental comedy to satisfy generally." Harrison's Reports wrote that West and Fields "play up to each other very well and make a good team. Due to their efforts the picture offers good mass entertainment, in spite of the fact that the story is thin." Film Daily wrote that it was "all lusty fun" with "some amusing gags and situations." John Mosher of The New Yorker called West "as fresh and ebullient as ever" after her two-year absence from the screen.

My Little Chickadee was a box office success, earning $2 million in gross receipts.
