= Why Bring That Up? =

1929 film

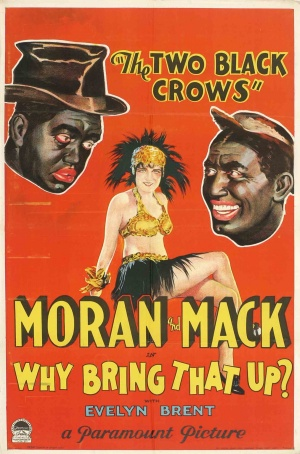
- Theatrical poster
- Directed by: George Abbott
- Written by: Octavus Roy Cohen (story); George Abbott (screenplay); Hector Turnbull (screenplay)
- Starring: Charles Mack; George Moran; Evelyn Brent; Harry Green; Bert Swor
- Cinematography: J. Roy Hunt
- Edited by: William Shea
- Music by: Sam Coslow (songwriter); Leo Robin (songwriter); Richard A. Whiting (songwriter)
- Distributed by: Paramount Pictures
- Release date: October 12, 1929
- Running time: 82 minutes
- Country: United States
- Language: English

Why Bring That Up? is a 1929 American pre-Code musical film directed by George Abbott and starring minstrel show comedians Charles Mack and George Moran, as blackface team Two Black Crows.

The film's title was part of the "vernacular of the day". It was the duo's first talking comedy film. Their 1930 film Why Bring That Up? followed. They also had a radio show and made recordings.

== Plot ==
George's partner in vaudeville quits their act, claiming that Betty has broken his heart. George then teams up with Charlie, a stranded trouper, and Irving becomes their manager. Later, in New York, the "Two Black Crows" star in their own revue and save money to build their own theater on Broadway. Betty comes to the theater with her lover, who poses as a cousin and induces George to hire her. He showers her with jewels and money. She tries to persuade George to invest in oil stock her lover is selling, and though their act is a success, Charlie fires Betty. When Charlie and Betty have a lover quarrel, Charlie is injured.

== Cast ==
- Charles Mack as Mack
- George Moran as Moran
- Evelyn Brent as Betty
- Harry Green as Irving
- Bert Swor as Bert
- Freeman Wood as Powell
- Lawrence Leslie as Casey
- Helen Lynch as Marie
- Selmer Jackson as Eddie
- Jack Luden as Treasurer
- Monte Collins as Skeets (as Monte Collins Jr.)
- Eddie Kane as Manager
- Charlie Hall as Tough (as Charles Hall)

== Soundtrack ==
- Do I Know What I'm Doing While I'm in Love, written by Leo Robin, Richard A. Whiting (as Richard Whiting) and Sam Coslow
- Shoo Shoo Boogie Boo, performed by Ethel Waters, written by Leo Robin, Richard A. Whiting (as Richard Whiting) and Sam Coslow

== Reception ==
The Toronto Daily Star deemed the film a "success".

== See also ==
- List of early sound feature films (1926–1929)
