= George Moran (comedian) =

Minstrel show performer (1881–1949)

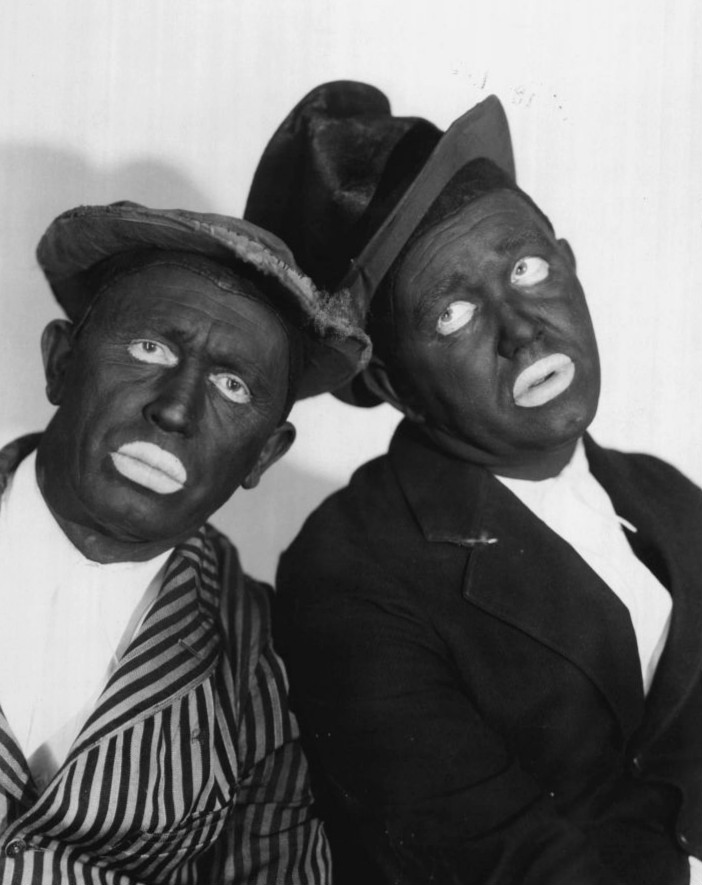
Moran and Mack in character in 1929.

George Moran (October 3, 1881 – August 1, 1949) was an American minstrel show performer who worked in blackface. He worked with Charles Mack as the Two Black Crows from 1921 to 1930 and 1931 to 1934. He also portrayed Native Americans in comedy films.

== Biography ==
He was born on October 3, 1881, in Elwood, Kansas, as George Searcy. He died on August 1, 1949, in Oakland, California.

== Selected filmography ==
- Why Bring That Up? (1929) as Moran
- Anybody's War (1930) as Willie
- Hypnotized (1931)
- The Fatal Glass of Beer (1933) as Indian Chief
- My Little Chickadee (1940) as Milton, a Native American
- Alias the Deacon (1940) as Taciturn Indian
