= Two Black Crows =

Blackface comedy act

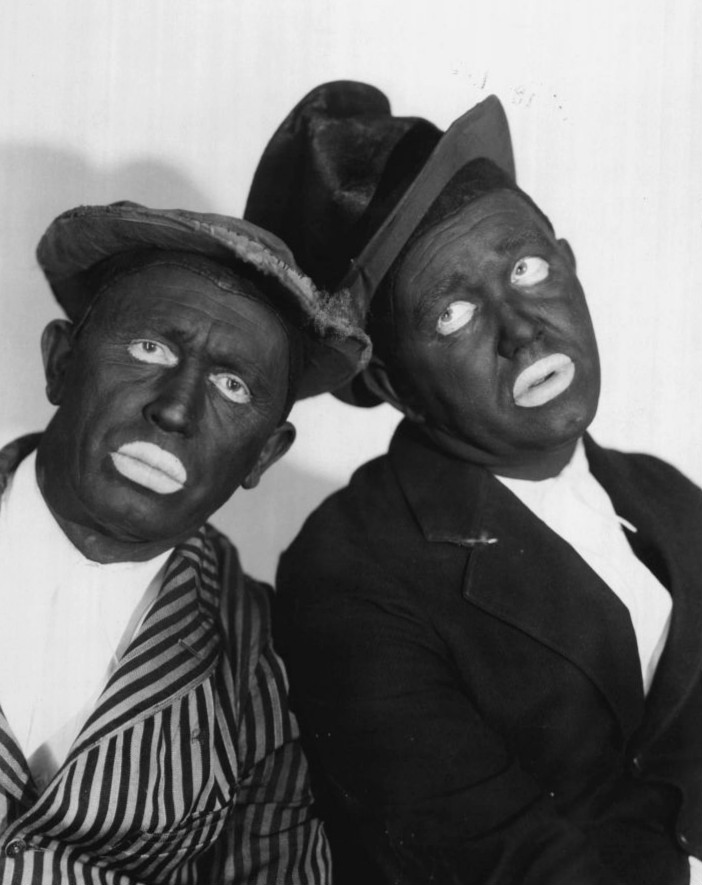
George Moran and Charles Mack in character in 1929.

The Two Black Crows (also called The Black Crows and Moran and Mack) was a blackface comedy act popular in the 1920s and 1930s. The duo appeared in vaudeville, on Broadway, on radio, comedy records, and in film features and shorts.

== History ==
The act was originated by Charles Sellers (1888–1934), who hired actor John Swor as his partner. "Swor & Mack" enjoyed moderate success until Swor left the act. He was replaced by George Moran. The team of Moran and Mack caught on and became major recording stars. The Two Black Crows became a weekly radio show in 1928; Moran and Mack also guest-starred on Fred Waring's radio show in 1933.

Although Moran and Mack's gags were mostly corny and the characters were stereotypical (one practical but naive, the other seemingly slow and lazy yet quick with a quip and a certain skewed logic), the relationship depicted plus their laconic delivery made them one of the most successful of comedy teams.

The team was known for two catchphrases. Moran would remind Mack of some unfortunate event, causing Mack to say, "Why bring that up?" Mack frequently would interrupt Moran's description of something with a drawling "What causes that?"

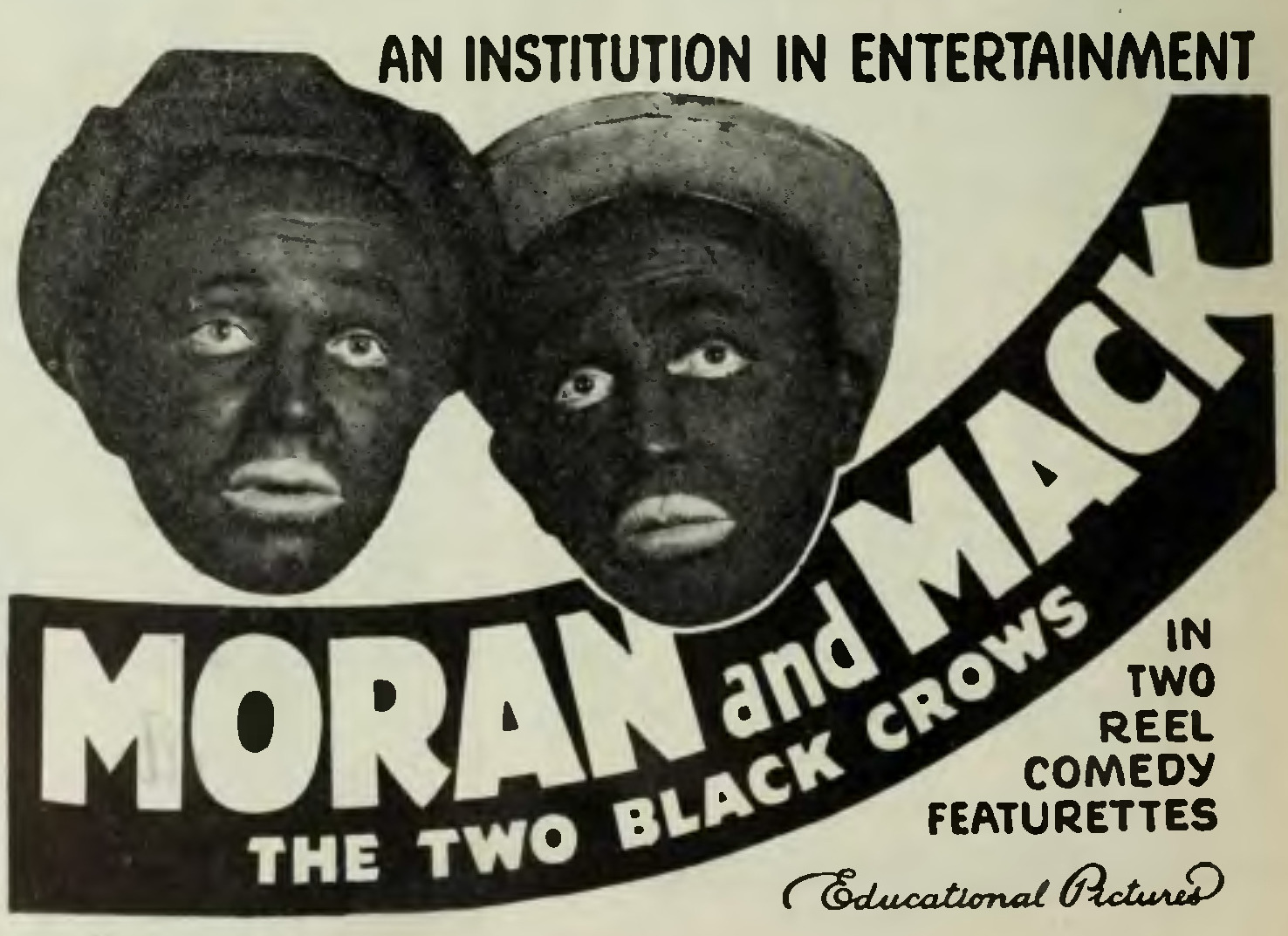
Moran and Mack The Two Black Crows ad from The Film Daily, 1932

The duo of Moran and Mack appeared in vaudeville with W.C. Fields, on Broadway in the Ziegfeld Follies of 1920 and in Earl Carroll's Vanities in the mid-1920s. They also appeared in George White's Scandals and The Greenwich Village Follies.

At the height of their popularity, after completing their first talking feature film, Moran had a salary dispute with Mack and sued him in 1930. A judge ruled that Mack legally owned the act and could pay whatever salary he wanted. Moran quit.

He was replaced by John Swor's brother, Bert Swor, who adopted the name Moran. George Moran reconciled with Mack and rejoined the act 10 months after leaving. In 1933, the low-budget Educational Pictures studio hired them for a feature film and a series of "Two Black Crows" short subjects.

Charles Mack died in an automobile accident on January 11, 1934. This ended the act, although George Moran did try to revive it with other partners.

Moran would later appear in three W. C. Fields films, The Fatal Glass of Beer, My Little Chickadee, and The Bank Dick.

Moran died on August 1, 1949.

== Legacy ==
Their catch phrase, "Who wants a worm, anyhow?", was the punchline to a lengthy dialogue that Moran initiated by telling Mack that, "The early bird catches the worm". Mack had never heard the expression, so he took it literally, and frustrated Moran by repeatedly asking inane questions about the saying. "Who wants a worm, anyhow?" was the closing statement by the crow in a Warner Bros. cartoon called The Wacky Worm, and parts of the routine appeared in other Warner cartoons.

== Jokes ==
Typical joke:

MACK: On our farm, we had a thousand chickuns, an' 999 o'em laid eggs.
MORAN: What was wrong with de udder one?
MACK: Uh, he was de head man.

Once Moran played a blast on his kazoo.

MACK (annoyed): Boy, even if dat was good, I wouldn't like it!
MORAN: I can play anything on dis!
MACK: You caint play piano on dat!

Another gag was:

MACK: I'll meet you down by de pig-pen. You better keep yo hat on so's I'll know ya!

Even a watermelon joke, the essence of racial stereotyping, took on a certain surrealist air in their hands:

MACK: Wish I had an ice-cold watamelon.
MORAN: Oh lawdy. Me too.
MACK: Wish I had a thousand ice-cold watamelons.
MORAN: Glory be. I bet if you had a thousand ice-cold watamelons, you'd give me one.
MACK: No, no siree! If you are too lazy to wish for your own watamelons, you ain't gon' git none o' mine.

== Films ==
Year	Title	Distributor	Notes
1927	Two Flaming Youths	Paramount Pictures	Lost
1929	Why Bring That Up?	Paramount Pictures	
1930	Anybody's War	Paramount Pictures	AKA Two Black Crows in the AEF
1932	Hypnotized	Sono Art-World Wide Pictures	AKA Little Gypsy
1933	A Pair of Socks	Educational Pictures	Short
1933	The Farmers' Fatal Folly	Educational Pictures	Short
1933	Hot Hoofs	Educational Pictures	Short
1933	Two Black Crows in Africa	Educational Pictures	Short
1933	As the Crows Fly	Educational Pictures	Short
1933	Blue Blackbirds	Educational Pictures	Short

== Recordings ==
- Early Bird Catches the Worm (3/14/1927)
- All About the Lions (7/18/1927)
- Curiosities on the Farm (11/14/1927)
- No Matter How Hungry the Horse Is, He Can't Eat a Bit (11/25/1927; 12/23/1927)
- B Our Child (12/22/1927) (as Charles E. Mack)
- Elder Eatmore's Sermon on Throwing Stones (12/23/1927)
- Two Black Crows Part 1/Part 2 (Columbia #935-D) (1928) (78 RPM)
- Two Black Crows Part 3/Part 4 (Columbia #1094-D) (1928) (78 RPM)
- Two Black Crows Part 5/Part 6 (Columbia #1198-D) (1928) (78 RPM)
- Two Black Crows Part 7/Part 8 (Columbia #1350-D) (1928) (78 RPM)
- Two Black Crows in the Jailhouse Part 1/Part 2 (Columbia #1560-D) (9/8/1928) (78 RPM)
- Two Black Crows in Hades Part 1/Part 2 (Columbia #1652-D) (11/14/1928)
- Courthouse Bump - Jelly Roll Morton's Orchestra (7/9/1929)
- Foolishments (6/5/1929)
- Esau Buck (6/4/1929)
- Drag 'Em - Mary Lou Williams (piano) (12/1930)
