= Charles Mack (performer) =

American singer (1888–1934)

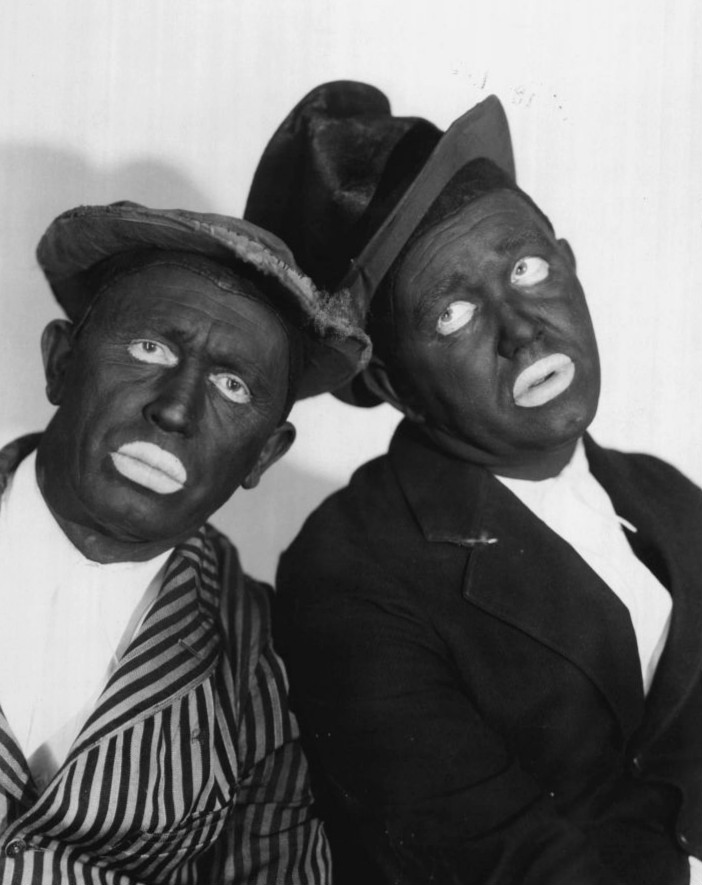
Moran and Mack in character in 1929

Charles Sellers (November 22, 1888, in White Cloud, Kansas – January 11, 1934) was an American minstrel show performer who worked in blackface under the stage name Charles Mack. He worked with John Swor and later George Moran as the "Two Black Crows". The duo featured on a radio show and in films. The made Columbia Records recordings.

He married Marian Robinson. They divorced in 1931. He later married Myrtle Buckley on July 24, 1932, in San Diego, California.

He died on January 11, 1934, in Mesa, Arizona, in a car accident. He was driving when a tire blew out and the car overturned several times. His wife was injured but survived. Also in the car were his daughter, Mary Jane Mack, George Moran and Mack Sennett. The funeral arrangements were made by W. C. Fields and William S. Hart. Hart gave the eulogy and Noah Beery sang. He was buried in Forest Lawn Memorial Park in Glendale, California. His estate was valued at $50,000 (approximately $1,203,000 today).

He was sued by his architect after claiming he had designed and supervised construction of his Newhall home.

== Filmography ==
- Two Flaming Youths (1927)
- Why Bring That Up? (1929)
- Anybody's War (1930)
- Hypnotized (1931)
