= Vitaphone Varieties =

Title of a series of short film "talkies" of 1920s

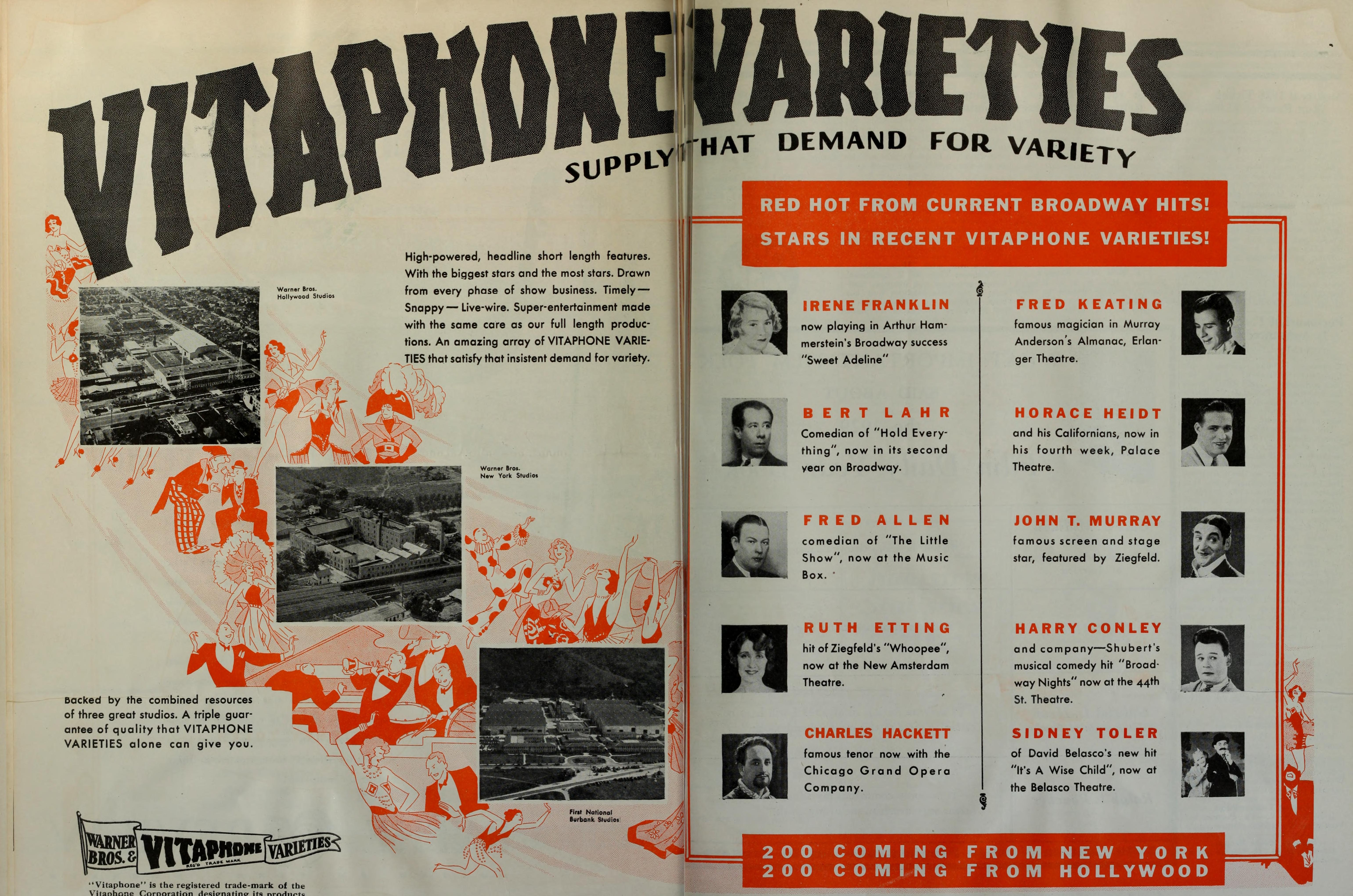
- A 1929 ad for the series in The Film Daily
- Directed by: Doc Salomon; Roy Mack; William A. Seiter
- Written by: Buddy Cooper; Sammy Stept; Walter Weams
- Music by: Herman Heller
- Color process: B&W; Technicolor
- Production company: Warner Bros. Pictures
- Distributed by: Warner Bros. Pictures
- Running time: 10 — 15 minutes
- Country: United States
- Language: English

Vitaphone Varieties is a series title (represented by a pennant logo on screen) used for all of Warner Bros.' earliest short film "talkies" of the 1920s, initially made using the Vitaphone sound on disc process before a switch to the sound-on-film format early in the 1930s. These were the first major film studio-backed sound films, initially showcased with the 1926 synchronized scored features Don Juan and The Better 'Ole. Although independent producers like Lee de Forest's Phonofilm were successfully making sound film shorts as early as 1922, they were very limited in their distribution and their audio was generally not as loud and clear in theaters as Vitaphone's. The success of the early Vitaphone shorts, initially filmed only in New York, helped launch the sound revolution in Hollywood.

== Overview ==
The series featured many great vaudeville and musical performers of the 1920s. Classical musicians who dominated the early days of recorded sound made their film debuts, along with the many future stars of radio's "golden age": Fred Allen, Jack Benny, George Burns, Gracie Allen, Edgar Bergen, Jack Haley just to name a few. Several top stars at Warner Bros. and other studios like Joe E. Brown, Joan Blondell, William Demarest, Claire Trevor, Sylvia Sidney, Humphrey Bogart and Spencer Tracy first appeared on screen in ten-minute dramatic and comedy sketches, as did a few silent stars making the transition like Blanche Sweet.

Al Jolson filmed A Plantation Act in August 1926, a full year before The Jazz Singer. When Warner Brothers decided to promote the feature as Jolson's talkie debut, the earlier short was removed from circulation. Initially thought lost, it was restored, in part by the Vitaphone Project's efforts, for a laser disc set in the 1990s and later released on DVD with the feature.

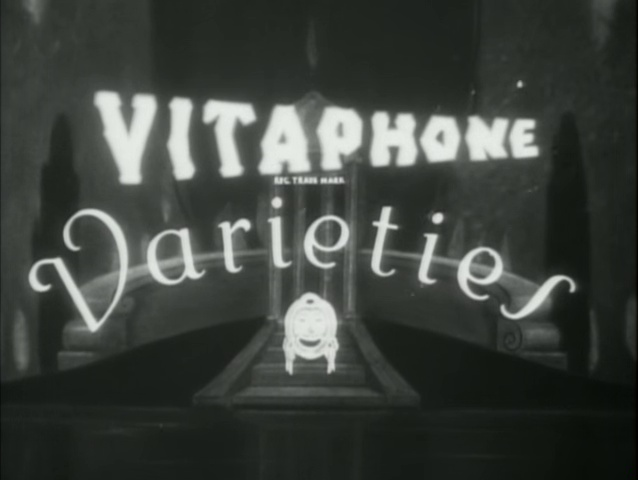
Intertitle before a 1930 short

At the time, there was much fear that these little films (and the sound features that followed) would kill vaudeville, a fear that was justified for many individual performers. While there was always a chance that a stage performer could become a household name by appearing in these, his or her act could no longer be repeated on stage, town after town, once one filmed performance appeared in theaters across the country. A few comedy acts for Vitaphone even made light of this fact, particularly Georgie Price’s 1929 title, Don't Get Nervous.

Although the term "Vitaphone Variety" was still used with some Warner film shorts running under one reel (or 10 minutes) well into the 1950s, the trade periodicals marketed them under different logos after the 1931–32 season: Pepper Pots and Vitaphone Novelties (after 1936), while lengthier productions (running two reels or 20 minutes) morphed into the Broadway Brevities. By this time, the primary producer in charge was Samuel Sax, who oversaw the majority of the New York filmed productions. Later titles completed in California in the forties and fifties sometimes recycled the "Vitaphone Variety" logo, but were usually marketed in the trade periodicals as either "Hollywood Novelties" or "Warner Novelties" and were mostly documentary rather than musical or comedy acts. Among this later group, two 1945-46 titles, Story of a Dog and Smart as a Fox, were nominees for the Academy Award for Best Live Action Short Film in the one-reel category.

== Recent rediscovery ==
The impact that the earliest Vitaphone Varieties had on world cinema has been a frequent footnote in many film history books, but it was only in recent decades that books have bothered to analyze them in depth (among them, Roy Liebman's Vitaphone Films and Edwin M. Bradley's The First Hollywood Sound Shorts, 1926–1931).

The Vitaphone Project only started in 1991 rounding up missing discs and matching them with films made before the studio switched to optical film soundtracks. Three years later, MGM/UA issued the first group of them to laser disc, with Warner releasing the first significant number on DVD as part of a multi-disc edition of The Jazz Singer. Since then, the Warner Archive Collection has made more available in a series of sets, as well as re-releasing Don Juan with its accompanying shorts.

== List of Vitaphone Varieties ==
The following list is not complete but fairly close. The 1926–1932 titles (the official "Vitaphone Varieties") are arranged by the Vitaphone title card numbers. They are then grouped by the year in which they were filmed, but not necessarily the same year they were released to theaters. If known, that date is listed right after the major credits (just the key director, if known, and the performers). Sometimes the date Film Daily reviewed it or the copyright date (©) is listed. DVD availability is also listed at the end of each line.

=== 1926 ===
Listed by Vitaphone number. Filmed in 1926 in New York City.

#	Title	Director	Release, copyright or review date	Performers	Film	Distributor	Notes
116	Pagliacci		February 1926	Pagliacci & Vitaphone Symphony			First Warner Bros. short film
131	Bob Witt and Cy Berg		April 1926	Bob Witt & Cy Berg with Vitaphone Symphony			
165	Rin Tin Tin		April 1926	Rin Tin Tin and Corporal Lee Duncan			test film
178	The Volga Boatman		May 1926	Vitaphone Symphony			
183	An Evening on the Don		August 6, 1926				Shown at the premiere of Don Juan (1926 film).
192	Introduction of Vitaphone Sound Pictures		August 6, 1926	Will H. Hays			Don Juan (1926 film) DVD
198	Giovanni Martinelli		August 6, 1926	Giovanni Martinelli			Don Juan (1926 film) DVD
263	Overture to Mignon		August 6, 1926	Henry Kimball Hadley & the New York Philharmonic			
274 & 275	Mischa Elman		August 6, 1926	Mischa Elman			(released as two separate film shorts) Don Juan (1926 film) DVD
278	Polonaise in A Flat		© April 7, 1927	Harold Bauer			
281	Efrem Zimbalist & Harold Bauer Duet		August 6, 1926	Efrem Zimbalist & Harold Bauer			Don Juan (1926 film) DVD
294	La Fiesta		August 6, 1926	Anna Case, The Cansinos, Metropolitan Opera Chorus			Don Juan (1926 film) DVD
296	Swanee River		© April 8, 1927	Anna Case, Roy Smeck & the Dixie Jubilee Singers			
301	The Recording			Doris Becker			
302	His Pastimes		August 6, 1926	Roy Smeck			Don Juan (1926 film) DVD
308	Marion Talley		August 6, 1926	Marion Talley			Don Juan (1926 film) DVD
314	Overture Tannhäuser		August 6, 1926	Henry Kimball Hadley & the New York Philharmonic			Don Juan (1926 film) DVD
316	Overture William Tell		August 6, 1926	The New York Philharmonic			
339	Behind the Lines		October 7, 1926	Elsie Janis			Shown at the premiere of The Better 'Ole (1926 film); The Jazz Singer DVD
349	Between the Acts at the Opera		October 7, 1926	Willie and Eugene Howard			Shown at the premiere of The Better 'Ole (1926 film); Vitaphone Cavalcade of Musical Comedy Shorts (Warner Archive) DVD
355	George Jessel A Theatrical Booking Office		October 7, 1926	George Jessel			Shown at the premiere of The Better 'Ole (1926 film)
359	A Plantation Act		October 7, 1926	Al Jolson			Shown at the premiere of The Better 'Ole (1926 film); The Jazz Singer DVD
361 & 365	Reinald Werrenrath		© March 12, 1927	Reinald Werrenrath			(released as two separate film shorts); Shown at the premiere of The Better 'Ole (1926 film)
366	Modern Song and Syncopation		© April 2, 1927	The Four Aristocrats - Eddie Lewis, Fred Weber, Bert Bennet & Tom Miller			
379	Mme Schumann-Heink		© April 2, 1927	Ernestine Schumann-Heink			
380	Madame Schumann-Heink		© April 4, 1927	Ernestine Schumann-Heink			
381	The Spirit of 1918 Overture		October 7, 1926	Herman Heller & Vitaphone Orchestra			Shown at the premiere of The Better 'Ole (1926 film)
383	Way Down South		October 7, 1926	Mary Lewis			
390 & 391	Vincent Lopez and His Orchestra		October 7, 1926	Vincent Lopez			(released as two separate film shorts)
392	Charles Hackett		© March 12, 1927	Charles Hackett			
393	A Studio Scene		October 7, 1926	Bruce Bairnsfather			
394	Jack Smith the Whispering Baritone		© March 12, 1927	Whispering Jack Smith			
416 & 417	English Singers		© April 2, 1927	Flora Mann, Lillian Berger, Norman Stone, Nellie Carson, Norman Motley and Cuthbert Kelly			(released as two separate film shorts)
418	What Price Piano		© March 12, 1927	Pauline Alpert			
419	Pauline Alpert		© March 12, 1927	Pauline Alpert			
?	Casey at the Bat		1926	DeWolf Hopper			

=== 1927 ===
Listed by Vitaphone number. Filmed in 1927 both in Brooklyn (NYC) and Hollywood (LA)

#	Title	Director	Release, copyright or review date	Performers (and credited directors)	Film	Distributor	Notes
289 (NYC)	John Barclay, Tallest Baritone in the World		© April 4, 1927	John Barclay			
395 (NYC)	Gus Van & Joe Schenck		February 3, 1927	Van and Schenck			Shown at the premiere of When a Man Loves (1927 film)
414 (NYC)	Beniamino Gigli, assisted By M. Picco and Minna Egener and the Metropolitan Opera Chorus		February 3, 1927	Beniamino Gigli			Shown at the premiere of When a Man Loves (1927 film)
415 (NYC)	Quartet from Rigoletto		February 3, 1927	Beniamino Gigli (on tenor), Giuseppe De Luca (on baritone), Jeanne Gordon (contralto) and Marion Talley (soprano)			Shown at the premiere of When a Man Loves (1927 film)
(NYC)	Cliff Edwards		March 1927	Cliff Edwards			
420 (NYC)	The Rollickers		© April 2, 1927	Rollickers			
422 (NYC)	Hawaiian Nights		February 3, 1927	Hawaiian Orchestra			Vitaphone Varieties Vol. 2 (Warner Archive) DVD
423 (NYC)	Margaret McKee, Famous Whistler		© April 2, 1927	Margaret McKee			
424-425 (NYC)	Rex Schepp, Famous Banjo Player		© April 2, 1927	Rex Schepp			
428 (NYC)	Waring's Pennsylvanians		© March 16, 1927	Fred Waring and His Pennsylvanians			Vitaphone Varieties Vol. 2 (Warner Archive) DVD
434 & 435 (NYC)	Neville Fleeson & Gladys Baxter "Vaudeville Headliners"		February 11, 1927	Neville Fleeson & Gladys Baxter			(released as two separate film shorts)
438 (NYC)	Albert Spalding, Renowned American Violinist		© April 4, 1927	Albert Spalding (violinist)			
439 (NYC)	Albert Spalding, Renowned American Violinist		August 19, 1928 (Film Daily review)	Albert Spalding (violinist)			
441 & 442 (NYC)	Buddy Doyle, Popular Black Faced Comedian		© April 4, 1927	Buddy Doyle			(released as two separate film shorts)
443 (NYC)	Bernado De Pace "Wizard of the Mandolin"		April 4, 1927	Bernardo De Pace			The Jazz Singer DVD. Title card misspells De Pace's name
444 (NYC)	Lincoln's Gettysburg Address Impersonated and Interpreted by Lincoln Caswell		© April 4, 1927	Lincoln Caswell			
445 & 446 (NYC)	The Little Princess of Song		© April 4, 1927	Sylvia Froos			(two separate film shorts)
447 (NYC)	The Poet and Peasant Overture		© April 18, 1927	Herman Heller & Vitaphone Orchestra			
448 (NYC)	The Light Cavalry Overture		© June 29, 1927	Herman Heller & Vitaphone Orchestra			
449 (NYC)	The Raymond Overture		© April 18, 1927	Herman Heller & Vitaphone Orchestra			
450 (NYC)	The Morning, Noon and Night Overture		© April 9, 1927	Herman Heller & Vitaphone Orchestra			
451 (NYC)	Frances Alda and the Vitaphone Symphony		© April 9, 1927	Frances Alda			
461 (NYC)	The Orpheus Overture		© April 18, 1927	Herman Heller & Vitaphone Orchestra			
462 (NYC)	The Evolution of Dixie Overture		© July 2, 1927	Herman Heller & Vitaphone Orchestra			
463 (NYC)	Noble Sissle and Eubie Blake, International Stars of Syncopation		© April 9, 1927	Noble Sissle & Eubie Blake			
464 (NYC)	Noble Sissle and Eubie Blake, International Stars of Syncopation		© April 18, 1927	Noble Sissle & Eubie Blake			
465 (NYC)	Pennant Winning Battery of Songland		© April 9, 1927	Van and Schenck||The Jazz Singer DVD			
466 (NYC)	The Flonzaley Quartet, the World's Foremost String Ensemble		© April 18, 1927	Flonzaley Quartet with Adolfo Betti & Alfred Pochon (on violin), Iwan D'Archambeau (on cello) & Nicolas Moldavan (on viola)			
467 (NYC)	The Flonzaley Quartet, the World's Foremost String Ensemble		© April 18, 1927	The Flonzaley Quartet			
468 (NYC)	Roger Wolfe Kahn and His Orchestra		1927	Roger Wolfe Kahn & Mound City Blue Blowers			
469 (NYC)	Roger Wolfe Kahn and His Orchestra		February 1927	Roger Wolfe Kahn with Henri Garden & the Williams Sisters			
472 & 473 (NYC)	Bert Lewis "Broadway's Comedian"		© April 9, 1927	Bert Lewis with Jack Carroll at piano			(released as two separate film shorts)
474 (NYC)	Giovanni Martinelli Assisted by Jeanne Gordon		© April 18, 1927	Giovanni Martinelli			
475 (NYC)	Isa Kremer, the Supreme Interpreter of Ballad and Folk Songs		© April 9, 1927	Isa Kremer			
476 (NYC)	The Bennett Twins		© April 9, 1927	Bennett Twins			
477 (NYC)	A Naval Quartet		© July 2, 1927	The Admirals (Norman Bartlett, Jack Armstrong, Henry Durrett & Jack Keyes)			
479 (NYC)	Lyrics of Life		© April 18, 1927	May Usher			
480 (NYC)	Ruth Glanville, America's Premiere Saxophonist		© April 9, 1927	Ruth Glanville & the Vitaphone Orchestra			
481 (NYC)	John Charles Thomas, Renowned Stage and Concert Artist		© April 18, 1927	John Charles Thomas			
482 & 483 (NYC)	The Revelers		© April 18, 1927	The Revelers			(released as two separate film shorts); Vitaphone Varieties 1926-30 (Warner Archive) DVD
484 (NYC)	A Moonlight Romance		© April 18, 1927	Douglas Stanbury & Maria Gambarelli			
485 (NYC)	The Morrisey and Miller Vitaphone Revue		© April 18, 1927	Will Morrisey & Midgie Miller with Dave Ferguson, John Agee's dancing bull and "black bottom" horse, the Vitaphone Chorus & Gene Salzer's Orchestra.			
488 (NYC)	The Barber of Seville		© May 6, 1927	Giuseppe De Luca			frequently aired on Turner Classic Movies
490 (NYC)	A Russian Wedding Celebration		© April 19, 1927	Moscow Art Ensemble			
491 (NYC)	Eddie Conrad, Broadway's Favorite Comedian		© April 19, 1927	Eddie Conrad with Charlotte Conrad & ballerina Marion Eddy			
492 (NYC)	Johnny Marvin, Musical Comedy Star and Victor Recording Artist		© July 2, 1927	Johnny Marvin with Murray Kellner on violin, Andy Sannella on guitar and Frank Banta on piano			
493 & 494 (NYC)	John Charles Thomas and Vivienne Segal		© April 18, 1927	John Charles Thomas & Vivienne Segal			(released as two separate film shorts)
496 (NYC)	The Reformer		© June 29, 1927	Joe Browning			
498 (NYC)	Beniamino Gigli of the Metropolitan Opera Company		© May 6, 1927	Beniamino Gigli			
499 (NYC)	Marion Talley and Beniamino Gigli		© June 29, 1927	Marion Talley & Beniamino Gigli			
500 (NYC)	California Collegians		released?				
501 (NYC)	Raymond Eisman, the Little Artist		© July 2, 1927	Raymond Eisman			
503 (NYC)	Utica Jubilee Singers		© May 7, 1927				
505 (NYC)	Twinkle Twinkle		April 1927	Joe E. Brown			Vitaphone Varieties Vol. 2 (Warner Archive) DVD
507 (NYC)	At the Ball Game		May 7, 1927	Leo Carrillo			
509 (NYC)	Giovanni Martinelli Assisted by Louis D'Angelo		April 1927	Giovanni Martinelli			
510 (NYC)	Giovanni Martinelli		April 1927	Giovanni Martinelli			
512 (NYC)	A Song Recital		© June 29, 1927	Hearst Radio Kids			
515 (NYC)	The Kouns Sisters, the Mirror Voiced Sopranos		© July 2, 1927	Nellie & Sarah Kouns			
517 (NYC)	Beniamino Gigli Singing Selections from Act 2 of the Opera La Gioconda		© June 29, 1927	Beniamino Gigli			
518 (NYC)	The Pearl Fishers		© March 15, 1928	Beniamino Gigli & Giuseppe De Luca			
519 (NYC)	Florence Moore and Lt. Gitz Rice		© February 18, 1928	Florence Moore & Lieutenant Gitz Rice			
521 (NYC)	Carlos Sedano, Celebrated Concert Violinist		© June 29, 1927	Carlos Sedano			
524 (NYC)	Rosa Raisa and Giacomo Rimini		© May 19, 1927	Rosa Raisa & Giacomo Rimini			
527 & 528 (NYC)	The Yacht Club Boys, Popular Instrumental and Vocal Group		© June 29, 1927	Yacht Club Boys			(released as two separate film shorts)
530 & 531 (NYC)	The Record Boys, Radio Winners		© June 28, 1927	Frank Kamplain, Samuel Step & Al Bernard			(released as two separate film shorts)
532 (NYC)	The Loomis Twins, Darlings of Songland		© June 29, 1927	Maxine & Virginia Loomis			
534 (NYC)	A Few Moments with George Jessel		© June 29, 1927	George Jessel & Alex Sater			
535 (NYC)	An Office Scene		© June 29, 1927	George Jessel, Muriel Gray, Gladys Keck and Charles Canfield			
536 & 537 (NYC)	Billy Jones & Ernie Hare, the Happiness Boys		June 29, 1927	The Happiness Boys			two same titled film shorts; #537 available on Vitaphone Varieties Vol. 2 (Warner Archive) DVD
539 & 540 (NYC)	The Sunshine Boys "Triple Alliance of Song, Music and Fun"		© June 9, 1927	Dave Ringle, Eddie Roth & Billy Sharkey			(two separate film shorts)
542 (NYC)	Rosa Raisa and Giacomo Rimini (#2)		© May 19, 1927	Rosa Raisa & Giacomo Rimini			
(NYC)	Banjo Buddy		June 1927	Harold Sandelman			
(NYC)	Wanda Goll		June 1927	Wanda Goll			
543 (NYC)	Pals		© July 18, 1927	Willie and Eugene Howard			
544 (NYC)	The Four Aristocrats		May 1927 (filming date); © November 3, 1927	The Four Aristocrats (Bert Bennett, Fred Weber, Eddie Lewis & Tom Miller)			Features "My Regular Gal"; "I'm Looking Over a Four-Leaf Clover"; "You'll Never Be Missed a Hundred Years from Now"
545 (NYC)	The Four Aristocrats		May 1927 (filming date); © November 3, 1927	The Four Aristocrats (Bert Bennett, Fred Weber, Eddie Lewis & Tom Miller)			Features "A Little Music in the Moonlight"; "I Gotta Get Myself Somebody to Love"; "(The Gang That Sang) Heart of My Heart"
546 (NYC)	The Four Aristocrats		May 1927 (filming date); © July 11, 1927	The Four Aristocrats (Bert Bennett, Fred Weber, Eddie Lewis & Tom Miller)			Features "Hello! Swanee - Hello!"; "Don't Sing Aloha When I Go"; "I Never See Maggie Alone"; "Me Too"
547 (NYC)	The Four Aristocrats		May 1927 (filming date); © July 11, 1927	The Four Aristocrats (Bert Bennett, Fred Weber, Eddie Lewis & Tom Miller)			Features "Looking at the World thru Rose Colored Glasses"; "Bells of Hawaii"; "Voom Voom"; "The Glow-Worm"; "Sing, Katie"
548 (NYC)	Blossom Seeley & Benny Fields		© July 11, 1927	Blossom Seeley, Benny Fields, the Music Boxes, Chas Bourne & Phil Ellis on piano			The Jazz Singer DVD
549 (NYC)	Six Original Brown Brothers, Saxaphonic Jazz Masters and Orchestra		April 1927	Original Brown Brothers			
552 (NYC)	Call of the Nile		© July 11, 1927	Charles Hackett			
553 (NYC)	The Piano Duetists		© July 11, 1927	Victor Arden & Phil Ohman			Vitaphone Varieties Vol. 2 (Warner Archive) DVD
556-558 (NYC)	Cantor Josef Rosenblatt		May 1927	Yossele Rosenblatt			
557 (NYC)	Senator Edward H. Ford		© July 11, 1927	Edward H. Ford			
560 (NYC)	Irving and Jack Kaufman, Harmony Songsters		May 1927	Irving Kaufman (singer), Jack Kaufman			
562 (NYC)	Venita Gould, Famous Star Impersonator		© July 18, 1927	Venita Gould			
563 (NYC)	Eddie Conrad, Broadway's Favorite Comedian "So Far So Good"		© July 18, 1927	Eddie Conrad, ballet with Marion Eddy & Charlotte Conrad			
565 (NYC)	The Diplomats, High Hat Syncopators of Jazz		© July 18, 1927	Teddy King, Hal Salies, Johnny Ferrara, Andy Hamilton, Harry Nadell, Walter Read & George Coon			
566 (NYC)	Aunt Jemima "The Original Fun Flour Maker"		© July 18, 1927	Tess Gardella with pianist Art Sorenson			
568 (NYC)	Ernestine Schumann-Heink		© July 18, 1927	Ernestine Schumann-Heink			
570 (NYC)	Mike and Meyer		© July 18, 1927	Joe Weber (vaudevillian) & Lew Fields			
571 (NYC)	Arnaut Brothers the Famous Loving Birds		© July 18, 1927	John & Rene Arnaut			
572 (NYC)	In a Casting Office		© July 18, 1927	Willie and Eugene Howard with Sonia Jackson			
573 (NYC)	Frances Williams, Broadway's Queen of Jazz		© July 18, 1927	Frances Williams with Leo Feiner & the Vitaphone Symphony			
574 (NYC)	Biff and Bang Fisticuffs Funsters "Winner By A Nose"		© July 18, 1927	Ivan Falkenstein, Milton Weiss & Eddie Lewis			
608 (NYC)	Frank Moulan, Comedian and Comic Song Writer		© August 8, 1927	Frank Moulan			
609 (NYC)	The Four Buddies, Harmony Songsters		© August 22, 1927	Leonard Saxon, Philip Duey, James Waites and Henry Shope			
610 (NYC)	The Gale Brothers, Juvenile Comedians		© August 8, 1927	Abraham & Isadore Gale			
611 (NYC)	Adele Le Narr, the Wonder Kid of Vaudeville		June 1927	Adele Le Narr			
612 (NYC)	The Merl Twins, Syncopating Songsters		© August 8, 1927	Belle & Cecille Merl			
613 (NYC)	Knight MacGregor		© August 8, 1927	Knight MacGregor with pianist Edna Wallace			
614 (NYC)	Horace Britt		© August 22, 1927	Horace Britt with pianist Ruth M. Connist			
616 (NYC)	Roselle and Mack, Song and Dance Thrillers		June 1927	Mildred Rosenburg & Max Epstein			
617 (NYC)	Bob MacGregor, Radio's Scotch Comedian		© August 22, 1927	Bob MacGregor with Elspeth Brownwell at piano			
619 (NYC)	Harry Montgomery the Humorologist		© August 22, 1927	Harry Montgomery			
623 (NYC)	Miller and Farrell, Society's Favorite Entertainers		June 1927	James Miller & Charles Farrell			
625 (NYC)	The Freeman Sisters, Sunshine Spreaders from Roxy's Gang		© August 22, 1927	Mildred & Marjorie Freeman			
(NYC)	Bert Fiske		(released?)	Bert Fiske			
(NYC)	Radio Station		(released?)	Harry Downing			
2101 (LA)	Those Pullman Brothers, the Kings of Harmony		© August 8, 1927	Bryan Foy (director), Pullman Brothers			
2102 (LA)	A Night at Coffee Dan's (Ten Minutes at Coffee Dan's)		© August 15, 1927	Bryan Foy (director); William Demarest, Hutchings & Holloway, Nita Martan & Miss Gogo			
2103 (LA)	Banjomania		© August 22, 1927	Bryan Foy (director); Eddie Peabody			
2104 (LA)	Visions of Spain		© August 22, 1927	Lina Basquette, Sam Ash & Arthur Kay conducting the Vitaphone Orchestra			
2105 (LA)	Hot Songs and Hot Fingers		© August 8, 1927	The Trigg Brothers (Johnny & Jack Trigg) with John Maxwell & the Vitaphone Orchestra			
2106 (LA)	Allan Prior, Famous Australian Tenor and Star of "The Student Prince"		© September 13, 1927	Bryan Foy (director), Allan Prior			
2107 (LA)	The College Boy and California Medley Girls		© September 13, 1927	Bryan Foy (director); George Givot, Pearl Leonard & Nina Hinds			
2108 (LA)	The Accordion Man and Girl Imitator		June 1927	Bryan Foy (director); Dorothy Murray & Earl La Vere with De Sues, Furney & Johnson			
2109 (LA)	Carolynne Snowden & Co. - Colored Syncopation		© August 4, 1927	Carolynne Snowden, Henry "Tin Can" Allen, Harvey Oliver Brooks & Thomas Valentine			
2110 (LA)	Cockatoos at Their Best		© September 13, 1927	Bryan Foy (director); Fritz Landes			
2111 (LA)	Sherry Louise Marshall and the Three Bad Boys		© October 17, 1927	Bryan Foy (director), Sherry Louise Marshall, Cliff Sherry, Gene Warren & Bud Foster			
2112 (LA)	Hazel Green and Company		© September 13, 1927	Bryan Foy (director), Hazel Green			The Jazz Singer DVD
2113 (LA)	Russ Wildey and Billy Sheehan "Famous Radio and Vaudeville Artists"		© September 13, 1927	Bryan Foy (director); Accompanied by Arthur Kay & the Vitaphone Orchestra.			
2114 (LA)	Carnival Night in Paris		© December 4, 1927	Henry Halstead Orchestra with Betty Patrick			
2115 (LA)	Doris Duncan, Herring and Zeb		© October 17, 1927	Bryan Foy (director), Doris Duncan			
2116 (LA)	Cliff Nazarro "Versatile Young Artist" and the Two Marjories		© October 17, 1927	Bryan Foy (director); Cliff Nazarro			
2117 (LA)	In a Blacksmith's Shop		© November 8, 1927	Bryan Foy (director); J. Delon Jewkes & the Blacksmiths			
2118 (LA)	Auriole Craven the Dancing Violinist		© September 13, 1927	Auriole Craven			
2119 (LA)	O'Neil and Vermont, the Two Dark Knights		© December 27, 1927	O'Neil & Vermont			
2120 (LA)	The Cruse Brothers "Missouri Sheiks" with "Old Time Melodies in an Old Time Way"		© November 3, 1927	The Cruse Brothers			
2121 (LA)	The Beauty of Old Time Music		© November 8, 1927	Bryan Foy (director); the Three Colonial Girls (Louise Klos, Anna Timmnr and Jeanette Rogers)			
2122 (LA)	Joseph Diskay, the Hungarian Tenor		© November 3, 1927	Joseph Diskay			
2123 (LA)	Reb Spikes and His Follies Entertainers (Premiere Colored Orchestra with Dancers)		© October 17, 1927	Bryan Foy (director), Reb Spikes			
2124 (LA)	The Cruse Brothers, the Arkansaw Trio		© September 13, 1927	The Cruse Brothers			
2125 (LA)	Don Cummings the Drawing Room Roper		© October 18, 1927	Bryan Foy (director), Don Cummings			
2126 (LA)	Joe Wong the Chinese Jazz Boy		© October 17, 1927	Joe Wong			
2127 (LA)	High Up and Low Down		© October 17, 1927	Bryan Foy (director); Harry & Dan Downing			
2128 (LA)	Jane Pursell, Hollywood's Radio Girl		© October 17, 1927	Jane Pursell			
2129 (LA)	The Boob and His Harmonica		© October 17, 1927	Britt Wood			
2130 (LA)	Amateur Night		© October 17, 1927	Bryan Foy (director); William Demarest			
2131 (LA)	Personalities		© October 17, 1927	Bryan Foy (director); Florrie Le Vere & Lou Handman			
2132 (LA)	The Hoot Gibson Trio "The Hawaiian Serenaders"		© November 3, 1927	The Hoot Gibson Trio			
2133 (LA)	The Lash		© November 3, 1927	Bryan Foy (director); Hal Crane, William B. Davidson, Richard Tucker & others			
2134 (LA)	Under the Sea		© May 11, 1927	Gus Reed and his Frolickers			
2135 (LA)	The Talking Violin and the Blues Singer		August 1927	Wade Watts & Bobby Gilbert			
2136 (LA)	Gus Arnheim & His Ambassadors		© January 30, 1928	Gus Arnheim			
2137 (LA)	Tuning In		© November 3, 1927	Bryan Foy (director); Murray Roth (story)			
2138 (LA)	Night Court		© November 28, 1927	Bryan Foy (director); Murray Roth (story); William Demarest			The Jazz Singer DVD
2139 (LA)	The Serpentine		© December 29, 1927	Bryan Foy (director); Elmira Lane & the Vitaphone Girls			
2140 (LA)	Lillian Crowell and Ty Parvis, Vaudeville's Talented Children		© November 3, 1927	Lillian Crowell & Ty Parvis			
2141 (LA)	Realization		© November 3, 1927	Bryan Foy (director); Hugh Herbert, Anita Pam & Lee Kinney			
2142 (LA)	The Friars in a Monastery Cellar		© November 3, 1927	The Monastery Quartet			
2143 (LA)	When the Wife's Away		© November 28, 1927	Bryan Foy (director); Mabel Normandie & William Demarest			
2144 (LA)	The Land of Harmony		© November 28, 1927	Bartram & Saxton			
2145 (LA)	The Sweet Long Ago		© November 28, 1927	Alice Wellman & Paul Russell			
2146 (LA)	Two Doves in Dark Days		© November 28, 1927	Walter Weams & Ed Garr			
2147 (LA)	The Hostess		© November 28, 1927	Sally Fields (billed as "America's Greatest Entertainer")			
2148 (LA)	Solly Ward the "Foremost German Comedian" at the Party		© November 28, 1927	Bryan Foy (director), Solly Ward			
2149 (LA)	The Hunt: Hunting Songs		© December 29, 1927	Frolicker's Quartet & Vernon Rickard			
2149 (LA)	French Leave "War Days In the Trenches"		© November 23, 1927	Bryan Foy (director); Mildred Bailey & the Frolickers Quartette			
2150 (LA)	Jane and Katherine Lee		© December 4, 1927	Jane & Katherine Lee			
2159 (LA)	Buddy Cooper and Sammy Stept, Song Hit Writers		© December 8, 1927	Buddy Cooper & Sammy Stept			
2160 (LA)	Frank and Teddy Sabini, Popular Italian Comedians		© December 4, 1927	Frank & Teddy Sabini			
2169 (LA)	Non-Support		© December 4, 1927	Bryan Foy (director); Burr McIntish with Paul Kruger, Bonie Jean DeBard, Linda Ann Corlin & Harry Foy			
2170 (LA)	Phedre Overture		© December 29, 1927	Herman Heller & Vitaphone Symphony Orchestra			
2178 (LA)	Two Doves Flying High		© December 4, 1927	Walter Weams & Ed Garr			
2179 (LA)	Stranded		December 8, 1927	Richard Carle			
2180 (LA)	Hurley, Putnam and Snell, Popular Song Trio		© December 8, 1927	Hurley, Putnam & Snell			
2188 (LA)	The Tout		© December 8, 1927	Frank Gaby			
2189 (LA)	Arthur Pat West and His Middies "Syncopated Blues Players"		© December 8, 1927	Arthur Pat West			
2190 (LA)	Leon Navara in a Pianologue		© December 8, 1927	Leon Navara			
2199 (LA)	A Lesson in Golf		© December 8, 1927	Alex J. Morrison & Walter Weams			
2233 (LA)	A Man of Peace		© April 21, 1928	Hobart Bosworth with Charles Middleton & Ann McCay			
2234 (LA)	The Death Ship		© June 2, 1928	Jose Jackson (story); Mitchell Lewis, Jason Robards, Sr. & Elizabeth Page			Vitaphone Varieties 1926-30 (Warner Archive) DVD
2239 (LA)	Sunny California		© May 1, 1928	May McAvoy with Neely Edwards, Richard Carle & Arthur Collins			
2240 (LA)	Solomon's Children		© December 27, 1927	Bryan Foy (director); Hugh Herbert			
2242 (LA)	Dream Café		© December 27, 1927	Jimmy Clemons			Vitaphone Varieties 1926-30 (Warner Archive) DVD
2243 (LA)	Jolly Fanny Rice In "Types"		© December 27, 1927	Fanny Rice			
2244 (LA)	Putting It On		© December 27, 1927	Bryan Foy (director); Claudia Coleman			
2245 (LA)	Lynn Cowan Master of Ceremonies and Song Writer - Original Songs		© December 27, 1927	Lynn Cowan			
2246 (LA)	The Eternal Barrier		© December 29, 1927	Sarah Padden			
2247 (LA)	All In (For) Fun		© December 29, 1927	Charles Smith (story), John Hyams & Leila McIntire			
2249 (LA)	Campus Capers		© February 4, 1928	The Collegiate Four			
2250 (LA)	A Spanish Serenade		© February 4, 1928	The La Valles			
2251 (LA)	The Worrier		© February 4, 1928	Richard Carle			
2252 (LA)	The Author		© February 4, 1928	Bryan Foy (director); Walter Weems & Leo Sulkey			
2253 (LA)	Songs and Dances		© January 21, 1928	Dodie Coyle & Bobby Weir			
2254 (LA)	A Neapolitan Romance		© February 4, 1928	Pasquale Amato & Lillian Miles (on piano)			
2255 (LA)	Men Among Men		© January 21, 1928	Bryan Foy (director); Fred Ardath			
2256 (LA)	Clair Omar Musser, the World's Foremost Marimbaphonist		© January 21, 1928	Clair Omar Musser			
2257 (LA)	Two Doves Scared Stiff		© February 4, 1928	Walter Weems & Ed Garr			
2258 (LA)	Lynn Cowan, Vitaphone Community Singer		© December 27, 1927	Lynn Cowan			
2259 (LA)	The Lemon		© February 4, 1928	Hugh Herbert			
2260 (LA)	Master Gilbert, Sensational Child Artist		© January 21, 1928	Master Gilbert			
2261 (LA)	Harry Wayman & His Debutantes (Premiere Feminine Jazz Band)		© February 4, 1928	Harry Wayman			Vitaphone Varieties Vol. 2 (Warner Archive) DVD
2262 (LA)	A Garden of Songs		© January 21, 1928	The Harrington Sisters			
2263 (LA)	His Night Out		© February 17, 1928	Bryan Foy (director); John Miljan			
2264 (LA)	Playing Pranks With Webster		© February 4, 1928	Johnny Hyman			
2266 (LA)	Gene Morgan, the West's Comedian and His Orchestra		© February 17, 1928	Gene Morgan			
2267 (LA)	Rin Tin Tin and His Owner, Mr. Lee Duncan		February 4, 1928	Rin Tin Tin			
2268 (LA)	Souvenirs		© February 17, 1928	Sarah Padden, Allen Stansell & Molly Fisher			
2269 (LA)	Haleyisms		© February 17, 1928	Jack Haley & Flo McFadden			
2270 (LA)	Frank Richardson, the Joy Boy of Song		© February 17, 1928	Frank Richardson			
2271 (LA)	Bartch-A-Kalloop		© February 10, 1928	Steve Freda & Johnny Palace			
2272 (LA)	Coscia and Verdi, Music Glorified, Classified and Mortified		© March 15, 1928	Phil Coscia & Al Verdi			
2273 (LA)	The Book Worm		January 4, 1928	Bryan Foy (director); Harry Conley, Ethel De Voe & Duncan Harris			Vitaphone Varieties 1926-30 (Warner Archive) DVD
2274 (LA)	Abe Lyman Orchestra "Syncopated Symphony"		© February 18, 1928	Abe Lyman Band with Jimmy Ray			
2275 (LA)	On the Air: An All Star Playlet		© February 18, 1928	John Maxwell, Hugh Herbert, Fanny Rice & Harry Downing			
2276 (LA)	Proff Moore and His Hotel Orchestra "California’s King of Harmony"		© February 15, 1929	Proff Moore & His Roosevelt Hotel Orchestra			
2277 (LA)	A Few Minutes in the Mines		© March 3, 1928	Flynn O'Malley, Vernon Rickard & the Black Diamond Four Quartette			
2278 (LA)	Character Studies		January 4, 1928	Montague Love			Vitaphone Varieties 1926-30 (Warner Archive) DVD
2279 (LA)	The Beast		© February 18, 1928	Irene Rich with John Miljan & Barry Townly			
2280 (LA)	The Imperial Russian Cossacks		© March 3, 1928				
2281 & 2282 (LA)	The Florentine Choir "Italy's Greatest Ensemble"		© February 18, 1928	The Florentine Choir			(released as two similar titled films)
2283 (LA)	The Fashion Plates of Harmony		© March 3, 1928	Messrs. Reese, R.L. Williams & Maginetti			
2284 (LA)	Lucky in Love		© March 15, 1928	Bryan Foy (director?); Clyde Cook, Hugh Herbert			
2285 (LA)	Earl Burtnett and His Biltmore Hotel Orchestra		© March 3, 1928	Earl Burtnett			Vitaphone Varieties Vol. 2 (Warner Archive) DVD
2286 (LA)	Earl Burtnett and His Biltmore Hotel Orchestra		© March 3, 1928	Earl Burtnett			
2290 (LA)	Papa's Vacation		© March 31, 1928	Bryan Foy (director); William Demarest			
2291 (LA)	Vincent Rose and Jackie Taylor and Their Hollywood Montmartre Orchestra		© March 3, 1928	Vincent Rose & Jackie Taylor			
2292 (LA)	Vincent Rose and Jackie Taylor with the Hollywood Montmartre Orchestra		September 30, 1928 (Film Daily review)	Vincent Rose & Jackie Taylor			
2300 (LA)	Juvenile Musicians		© March 31, 1928	Charles D. McCoy's Newsboys Harmonica Band			
2309 (LA)	Nat Carr, Character Comedian		© December 8, 1927	Nat Carr			
2310 (LA)	The Herman Music Box		© March 31, 1928	Jack Lipton & Lola Terrell			
2318 (LA)	East Side West Side		© December 29, 1927	Joe Weston & Collette Lyons			
2319 (LA)	Ten Minutes		© March 3, 1928	Robert T. Haines with Guy d'Ennery			
2320 (LA)	The Police Quartette		December 29, 1927	Los Angeles Police singing group			The Jazz Singer DVD
2328 (LA)	In the Park		© February 18, 1928	Brown & Whitaker			
2329 (LA)	Frank Richardson, the Joy Boy of Song #2		© February 18, 1928	Frank Richardson			
2338 (LA)	Abe Lyman and His Orchestra		© February 18, 1928	Abe Lyman and His Orchestra			Vitaphone Varieties Vol. 2 (Warner Archive) DVD; aka "Maestro of Syncopated Symphony"
2347 (LA)	Jimmy Lyons, the General of Hilarity		© April 21, 1928	Jimmy Lyons			
2369 (LA)	The Foreigner		© April 30, 1928	Leo Carrillo			
2379 (LA)	Charles Hackett, Leading Tenor of the Chicago Opera Company - Schubert's "Who Is Sylvia"		© July 1, 1928	Charles Hackett			

=== 1928 ===
Listed by Vitaphone number. Filmed in 1928 in Hollywood unless marked (NYC)

#	Title	Release, copyright or review date	Performers (and credited director)	Notes
2232	Two Boys and a Piano	© March 15, 1928	Brooks & Ross	
2235	Hollywood Bound	© June 4, 1928	Gladys Brockwell, James Bradburry, Neely Edwards, Anita Pam & Allan Sears	Vitaphone Varieties 1926-30 (Warner Archive) DVD
2236	When East Meets West	© March 15, 1928	Ray Mayer & Edith Evans	The Jazz Singer DVD
2237	Miss Information	April 10, 1928	Bryan Foy & F. Hugh Herbert (directors); Lois Wilson, Edward Everett Horton, Allan Sears & others	
2238	The Question of Today	March 15, 1928	Lloyd Bacon (director); Audrey Ferris, Landers Stevens & others	
2265	A Laugh or Two	© February 4, 1928	Russ Brown & Jean Whittaker	Vitaphone Varieties 1926-30 (Warner Archive) DVD
2285	Earl Burtnett and His Biltmore Hotel Orchestra	March 3, 1928	Earl Burtnett	Vitaphone Varieties 1926-30 (Warner Archive) DVD
2286	Earl Burtnett and His Biltmore Hotel Orchestra	March 3, 1928	Earl Burtnett	
2287	Overtones	© March 15, 1928	Ursula Faucit, Elizabeth Page & others	
2288	Vitaphone Community Sing #2	© July 24, 1928	Lynn Cowan	
2289	The Notre Dame Glee Club	© April 30, 1928	Joseph J. Casasanta (conductor)	
2293	The Morrissey & Miller Night Club Revue	© May 19, 1928	Bryan Foy (director); Will Morrisey & Midgie Miller with Harry Downing, Charlotte DeLovelace, Vina & Arthur and Sammy Cantor	Vitaphone Varieties 1926-30 (Warner Archive) DVD
2294	Earl Burtnett and His Biltmore Hotel Orchestra	© March 3, 1928; September 29, 1928 (Film Daily review)	Earl Burtnett	Vitaphone Varieties Vol. 2 (Warner Archive) DVD
2295	Earl Burtnett and His Biltmore Hotel Orchestra	© March 3, 1928	Earl Burtnett	Vitaphone Varieties 1926-30 (Warner Archive) DVD
2296	Billy & Elsa Newell, Those Hot Tamales	April 30, 1928	Billy & Elsa Newell	
2297	The Movie Chatterbox	© April 10, 1928	Polly Moran	
2298	Ted Doner "Broadway's Favorite Dancing Man" and His Sunkist Beauties	March 31, 1928	Ted Doner	
2299	Xavier Cugat and His Gigolos: A Spanish Ensemble	March 25, 1928 (Film Daily review)	Xavier Cugat	
2339	The Cowboy and the Girl	© April 21, 1928	Ray Mayer & Edith Evans	Vitaphone Varieties Vol. 3 (Warner Archive) DVD, Lights of New York (1928) DVD
2348	Stories in Song	March 18, 1928 (Film Daily review)	Adele Rowland with Mildred Brown (piano)	The Jazz Singer DVD
2349	The Jazzmania Quintette	© April 10, 1928	Georgie Stoll & Edythe Flynn	The Jazz Singer DVD
2358	Herbert Rawlinson, the Monologist of the Screen	© June 2, 1928	Herbert Rawlinson	
2359	Renee Tumanova and Company, Three Russian Gypsies	© May 19, 1928	Renee Tumanova	
2368	Lead Kindly Light	© July 23, 1928	Irene Rich	
2409	Jimmy Lyons	© February 4, 1928	Jimmy Lyons	
2418	Retribution	© June 14, 1928	Archie Mayo (director); Henry B. Walthall, Tom McGuire & Ed Cane	Vitaphone Varieties 1926-30 (Warner Archive) DVD
2430	General Vitaphone Trailer	© March 31, 1928	Conrad Nagel	
2517–2518 (two-reeler)	The Prediction	© July 10, 1928	Hugh Herbert with Anita Pam, Otto Lederer & Guy D'Enner	
2538	Dorothy Whitmore, the Popular Prima Donna in a Song Recital	© September 5, 1928	Dorothy Whitmore	
2539	Seven Minutes of Your Time	© September 5, 1928	Benny Rubin	
2540	By the Campfire	© May 19, 1928	Xavier Cugat & Company (Melodious Gypsies)	
2541	The Ice Man	© May 19, 1928	Murray Roth (director); Charles Rogers	
2542	Character Songs	© June 2, 1928	Harry Delf	
2543	A Colorful Sermon	© May 19, 1928	Bert Swor	Vitaphone Varieties 1926-30 (Warner Archive) DVD
2544	Ducks and Deducts	© May 19, 1928	Bert Swor	
2545	Mme Rosa Raisa (Soprano of the Chicago Opera Company) "Goodbye Forever" & "Eli Eli"	© May 19, 1928	Rosa Raisa	
2546	Mme Rosa Raisa "Plaisir d'Amour" & "La Paloma"	© May 19, 1928	Rosa Raisa	
2547	Vitaphone Community Sing #1	© March 3, 1928	Lynn Cowan	
2548	Stop and Go	© November 6, 1928	Eddie Nelson with Jack Lipson	
2550	The Movie Man	© June 2, 1928	Charles Rogers with Violet Palmer, Walter Rodgers & Louise Carver	
2551	Soup	© June 2, 1928	Harry Delf	
2552	The Hell Gate of Soissons	© August 14, 1928	Leo Carrillo	
2553	Jest Moments	© July 1, 1928	The Klein Brothers	
2554	Wanted - a Man	© August 25, 1928	Daphne Pollard	
2555	Charles Irwin, the Debonair Humorist	© July 1, 1928	Charles Irwin	
2556	The Globe Trotters	© July 1, 1928	Bill Bailey & Barnum	
2557	Without a Band	© July 1, 1928	Bill Bailey & Barnum	
2558	Two White Elephants	© July 1, 1928	Bill Bailey & Barnum	
2559	In a Music Shop	© July 12, 1928	Eddie Peabody	
2560	Banjoland	© June 2, 1928	Eddie Peabody with Jimmy Maisel	Vitaphone Varieties Vol. 2 (Warner Archive) DVD
2561	Keep Smiling	© July 1, 1928	Ed Lowry & His Orchestra	
2562	The Larry Ceballos Revue	March 1928	Larry Ceballos accompanied by Owen Fallon's Orchestra, Al Herman Badger & Lory, Irma, Dot & Ama Lou	
2563	Giving In	© July 1, 1928	Murray Roth (director); Harry Delf, Hedda Hopper & others	
2565	The Happy Jester	© July 1, 1928	Ed Lowry	
2566	Dixie Days "Negro Spirituals"	© August 18, 1928	Dixie Days	
2567	Cleo to Cleopatra	© June 30, 1928	Daphne Pollard	
2568–2569 (two-reeler)	Wives, etc.	© June 30, 1928	Bryan Foy (director); Charles Ruggles	
2570	Glorifying the American Song	© July 1, 1928	The Brox Sisters	
2571	Down South	© July 1, 1928	The Brox Sisters	
2572	The Band Beautiful	© June 30, 1928	The Ingenues All-Girl Orchestra	The Jazz Singer DVD
2572 & 2573	The Ingenues the Syncopating Sweeties	© June 15, 1928	The Ingenues	(two separate film shorts)
2574	A Little Bit of Everything	© July 1, 1928	Eddie Quillan & Marie Quillan	
2575–2576 (two-reeler)	The Swelled Head (The Swellhead)	© July 14, 1928	Eddie Foy, Jr. & Bessie Love	
2577	Sharps and Flats	© July 24, 1928	Jimmy Conlin & Myrtle Glass	Vitaphone Varieties 1926-30 (Warner Archive) DVD
2578	Assassin of Grief and Remorse	© July 24, 1928	Al Herman & His Troubadors	
2579	Foys for Joys	© July 1, 1928	Bryan Foy (director); Eddie Foy, Jr. & the Foy Family	
2580	Chips of the Old Block	July 1, 1928	Bryan Foy (director); Eddie Foy, Jr. & the Foy Family	The Jazz Singer DVD
2581	The Ham What Am	© June 30, 1928	Jay C. Flippen	Vitaphone Varieties 1926-30 (Warner Archive) DVD
2583	Songalogue	© July 31, 1928	Dolly Connolly & Percy Wenrich	
2584	Gus Arnheim and His Cocoanut Grove Orchestra	July 1928	Gus Arnheim	Vitaphone Cavalcade of Musical Comedy Shorts (Warner Archive) DVD
2585	Gus Arnheim and His Ambassadors	July 15, 1928 (Film Daily review)	Gus Arnheim, Harry Robison & Russ Columbo	The Jazz Singer DVD
2586	Cut Yourself a Piece of Cake	© June 30, 1928	Val & Ernie Stanton	Vitaphone Varieties 1926-30 (Warner Archive) DVD
2587	English As She Is Not Spoken	© June 30, 1928	Val & Ernie Stanton	Vitaphone Varieties 1926-30 (Warner Archive) DVD
2588	Terry and Jerry	© July 14, 1928	Fields & Johnston	
2589	Don't Handle the Goods	© August 25, 1928	Frank Browne & Kay LaVelle	
2590	Don't Be Jealous	© August 18, 1928	Joe E. Brown with Harry Downing, Eugene Pallette & Patricia Caron	
2591	Winnie Lightner the Song a Minute Girl	June 30, 1928	Winnie Lightner	
2592	Winnie Lightner Broadway's Favorite	June 30, 1928	Winnie Lightner	
2593	The Arkansas Travelers	June 30, 1928	Meyers & Hanford	
2595	Dick Rich and His Melodious Monarchs	© July 24, 1928	Dick Rich, Cheri Rich (ventriloquist)	The Jazz Singer DVD & Vitaphone Varieties 1926-30 (Warner Archive) DVD
2596	Joseph E. Howard, America's Popular Composer	© July 24, 1928	Joseph E. Howard	Vitaphone Varieties Vol. 2 (Warner Archive) DVD
2597	Bright Moments	© July 30, 1928	Jack Benny & "Sayde" Marks (Mary Livingstone)	(very first Benny film may, unfortunately, be lost)
2598	Chief Caupolican, the Indian Baritone	© August 18, 1928	Chief Caupolican	
2599	Thanksgiving Day	© August 18, 1928	Harry Kelly, Cornelius Keefe, Harry Wardell & Walter Rodgers	Vitaphone Varieties 1926-30 (Warner Archive) DVD
2600	Miss Ann Grey and Her Boy Friends	© August 27, 1928	Ann Grey	
2607–2608 (two-reeler)	A Regular Business Man	© August 18, 1928	Robert Ober with John Sainpolis (St. Polis), Margery Meadows and Lucille Beaumont	
2609	Homer Dickinson, Broadway's Smart (Musical) Comedy Star	© August 27, 1928	Homer Dickinson	
2610	The Hi-Hatter	June 1928	Jack Inglis	
2620	A Friend of Father's	© August 18, 1928	Al Lydell & Bobby Higgins	
2627	Larry Ceballos' Roof Garden Revue	© November 14, 1928	Larry Ceballos & the Adagio Dancers	The Jazz Singer DVD
2628	Joseph Regan, America's Foremost Irish Tenor	© December 8, 1928	Joseph Regan	
2629	Here Comes the Bridesmaid	© March 12, 1929	Janet Adair	
2640	The Aristocrats	© March 12, 1929	Born & Lawrence	
2648–2649 (two-reeler)	Ain't It the Truth: A Comedy in Manners	© March 9, 1929	William B. Davidson, Grace Valentine, Dot Farley & Patricia Caron	
2650	A Musicale Melange	© March 12, 1929	Kjerulf's Mayfair Quintette (Barbara Kjerulf, Myra Dennis, Gladys Hubmer & Ida Schultz)	Vitaphone Varieties Vol. 3 (Warner Archive) DVD, Lights of New York (1928) DVD
2659	The Broadway Minstrel	© January 28, 1929	Murray Roth (director); Sam Coslow & June Clyde	
2660	How's Your Stock?	© September 22, 1928	Murray Roth & Bryan Foy (directors); Charlie Sellon	
2661	Larry Ceballos' Undersea Revue	September 2, 1928 (Film Daily review)	Larry Ceballos, Jimmy Clemons & Lyda Roberti	
2662	Types	August 19, 1928 (Film Daily review)	Karyl Norman	
2663	Silks and Satins	© August 20, 1928	Karyl Norman with Bob Hammill	
2664–2665 (two-reeler)	Across the Border	© August 27, 1928	Sarah Padden, Frank Campeau & Roy Stewart	
2666–2667 (two-reeler)	Sharp Tools	October 7, 1928	Willard Mack (director); Ethel Grey Terry, William B. Davidson & others	
2668	A Bit of Scotch	© August 27, 1928	Kitty Doner	
2669	A Famous Male Impersonator	September 5, 1928	Kitty Doner	
2670	Archie Gottler, His Songs are Sung in a Million Homes	© August 27, 1928	Archie Gottler, Babe Glick & Peggy Rollins	
2677–2678 (two-reeler)	The Alibi	June 1928	Kenneth Harlan	
2679	Dank You	© September 12, 1928	Joe Burns & Murray Kissen	
2680	Vitaphone Community Singing #3	© August 27, 1928	Lynn Cowan	
2685	Just Crooning Along	© September 5, 1928	The Croonaders	
2686	The Beau Brummels	© September 22, 1928	Al Shaw & Sam Lee	The Jazz Singer DVD
2687	The Reward	July 1928	Bryan Foy (director); Louis Bennison	
2689	I Thank You	© September 12, 1928	Eddie White	Vitaphone Varieties 1926-30 (Warner Archive) DVD
2691	A Breath of Broadway	© September 5, 1928	Jack Waldron	Vitaphone Varieties 1926-30 (Warner Archive) DVD
2692	Melody Lane	July 1928	The Dennis Sisters	
2693	Larry Ceballos' Crystal Cave Revue	November 18, 1928 (Film Daily review)	Larry Ceballos	
2694	A Rope and a Story	© October 18, 1928	Tex McLeod	
2695	The Northern Patrol	© November 6, 1928	Mounted Police Quartette	
2696	Chaz Chase, the Unique Comedian	© October 18, 1928	Chaz Chase	Vitaphone Varieties Vol. 2 (Warner Archive) DVD
2697	A Singing Act	September 2, 1928 (Film Daily review)	Bell & Coates	
2698	Horses	July 1928	Benny Rubin	
2699	A Cycle of Songs	September 2, 1928	Florence Brady	Vitaphone Varieties 1926-30 (Warner Archive) DVD
2700	Feminine Types	© December 8, 1928	Jean Barrios	
2702	De La Plaza and Juanita with Their Spanish Serenaders	© December 13, 1928	De La Plaza, Juanita, Alma Real, Royale Filipino Band	
2703	Small Town Rambles	January 27, 1929 (Film Daily review)	Al Abbott	
2704	A Family Affair	© January 28, 1929	Murray Roth (director); Arthur Byron with Kate, Eileen & Kathryn Byron	
2705	Irene Franklin, the American Comedienne	© January 14, 1929	Irene Franklin & Jerry Jarnagin	
2707	Songs and Things	© January 28, 1929	Jack Norworth	
2708	Give Us a Lift	© December 13, 1928	Bryan Foy (director); Flo Lewis & Leo Karlyn	
2709	42nd Street ("Zweiundvierzigste Strasse")	January 19, 1929	Frank Orth & Ann Codee	German and French version of AFTER THE HONEYMOON (qv)
2710	After the Honeymoon	January 19, 1929	Frank Orth & Ann Codee	
2730	Jesse Stafford Orchestra, World Famous Musician	October 28, 1928	Jesse Stafford, the Lucas Brothers	
2731	The Bad, Bad Woman	© October 18, 1928	Dora Maughan & Walter Fehl	
2732	Song Impressions	© October 18, 1928	Dora Maughan & Walter Fehl	Vitaphone Varieties 1926-30 (Warner Archive) DVD
2733	Donald Brian, America's Foremost Musical Comedy Star	© February 9, 1929	Donald Brian	
2734	Character Studies	September 2, 1928 (Film Daily review)	Murray Roth (director); Florence Brady	
2735	A Breeze from the South	© December 1, 1928	Gilbert Wells	Vitaphone Varieties Vol. 3 (Warner Archive) DVD, Lights of New York (1928) DVD
2736	Melodious Moments	© October 18, 1928	The Croonaders	Vitaphone Varieties Vol. 3 (Warner Archive) DVD, Lights of New York (1928) DVD
2737	Idle Chatter	© December 1, 1928	Kramer & Boyle	
2739	Popular Songs	© November 28, 1928	Anna Chandler	
2741	Songs and Impressions	August 1928	Mary Marlowe & Jordan	Vitaphone Varieties 1926-30 (Warner Archive) DVD
2743	Number Please	August 1928	Ruth Warren	
2744	The Gatling Gun	August 1928	Bert Hanlon	
2745	The Song Bird	© December 1, 1928	Stewart Brady	
2746	Singin' the Blues	July 1928	Jane Green & Ron Wilson	
2747	Bert Hanlon with Doris Canfield	August 1928	Bert Hanlon & Doris Canfield	
2748	The Gyp	© December 8, 1928	Fern Redmond & Herman Wells	
2750	The Melody Girl	July 1928	Jane Green & Ron Wilson	
2753	Bedtime	© March 20, 1929	Harry Hollingsworth & Nan Crawford	
2754	Spring Has Come	August 1928	Pert Kelton	
2755	Two Black Aces (A Pair of Aces)	© December 8, 1928	Slim Timblin & Billy Raymond	
2756	The Ban-Jokester	© November 24, 1928	Jack North	
2757	Fair Days	© November 24, 1928	Val Harris & Ann Howe	
2758	In Dutch	© December 1, 1928	Ulis & Clarke	
2759	The Wild Westerner	© November 14, 1928	Val Harris & Ann Howe	Vitaphone Varieties 1926-30 (Warner Archive) DVD
2762	The Beauty Shop	© December 1, 1928	Mary Haynes	
2763	The Lady That's Known Lou	December 1, 1928	Mary Haynes	
2766	Cross Words	© November 24, 1928	Newhoff & Phelps	
2767	Sing, Sister, Sing	September 1928	Hazel Kennedy	
2768	Neighbors	© December 8, 1928	Jack Baxley & Babette Wilson	
2769	I'm Afraid That's All	© December 8, 1928	Red Corcoran	
2770	A Little Conversation	September 1928	Bert Hanlon & Doris Canfield	
2783	Songs As You Like Them	© December 8, 1928	Irene Stone & Esther Larette	
2784	A Group of Songs	© November 24, 1928	Jay Velie	
2785	A Little Bit of This and That	(never released)	Frank Shaw	
2786	King and Boles	October 1928		
2788	Not for Me	October 1928	Murray Roth (director); Miss Juliet	
2789	Al Lyons and His Four Horsemen (aka "My Musical Melange")	© January 28, 1929	Al Lyons, Jack Beardsley, D.M. Taylor, Neal Castagnoli & Edith Murray	Vitaphone Varieties 1926-30 (Warner Archive) DVD
2790	Jan Rubini "The Violin Virtuoso" with Vernon Rickard	January 27, 1929 (Film Daily review)	Murray Roth (director); Jan Rubini	
2791	My Bag O' Trix	© January 14, 1929	Trixie Friganza	Internet Archive, The Jazz Singer DVD
2793	Army Days	November 1928	Murray Roth (director); Lieutenant Clifford Carling	
2795	An Everyday Occurrence	© May 27, 1929	Murray Roth (director); Wilbur Mack & Gertrude Purdy	
2796	Here Comes the Show Boat	© April 6, 1929	Murray Roth (director); Dave Bernie's Orchestra	
2797	Dave Bernie's Orchestra	© April 20, 1929	Murray Roth (director); Dave Bernie	
2798	Stranded in Paris	© March 12, 1929	Ann Codee & Frank Orth	
2800	What Price Burlesque?	November 1928	Murray Roth (director); Sammy Cohen	
2814	Red Hot Harmony	© March 12, 1929	Murray Roth (director); The Serenaders	
2815	The Sunshine Girl	© March 12, 1929	Murray Roth (director); Hope Vernon	
2816	The Land of Harmony	© February 9, 1929	The Plantation Trio	
2817	Who Is She?	November 1928	Murray Roth (director); Joseph Bernard	
2819	Roy Fox, the Whispering Cornetist	© March 12, 1929	Murray Roth (director); Roy Fox & His Montmarte Café Orchestra	Vitaphone Varieties Vol. 2 (Warner Archive) DVD
2820	The Gladiator	November 1928	Murray Roth (director); Jimmy Conlin & Myrtle Glass	
2837	The Fall Guy	© May 12, 1929	Murray Roth (director); Ray Hughes & Pam	
2838	Syncopated Breezes	© March 12, 1929	Murray Roth (director); Bobby Gillette & Doris Walker	
2839	A Modern Priscilla	March 10, 1929 (Film Daily review)	Murray Roth (director); Bobby Folsom	
2840	The Picadilly	November 1928	Murray Roth (director); William DuCalion	
2849–2850 (two-reeler)	Gossip	March 31, 1929 (Film Daily review)	Bryan Foy (director); Robert Emmet Keane, John Milijan & Claire Whitney	Vitaphone Varieties 1926-30 (Warner Archive) DVD
2868	The Night Club Favorite	© March 9, 1929	Murray Roth (director); Joe E. Lewis	
2869	Flaming Youth	© March 7, 1929	Murray Roth (director); Little Billy	
2870	Artistic Mimicry	© March 20, 1929	Murray Roth (director); Bruce Bowers	
2883	The Paragons in the Tropics	March 10, 1929 (Film Daily review)	Doc Salomon (director); The Paragons & Doris Walker	
2885	The Country Gentlemen	© January 28, 1929	Murray Roth (director); Jack Born & Elmer Lawrence	Vitaphone Varieties 1926-30 (Warner Archive) DVD
2888	Headin' South	© April 6, 1929	The Three Brox Sisters	
2889	Tin Pan Alley	© January 28, 1929	Murray Roth (director); Dave Dreyer & Nora Schiller	
2899	Harmony As You Like It	December 1928	Doc Salomon (director); Bert Rome & Henry Dunn	
2900	After the Roundup	December 1928	Doc Salomon (director); The Rangers	Vitaphone Varieties 1926-30 (Warner Archive) DVD
2910	The Champion Golfer	© March 16, 1929	Doc Salomon (director); Ben Bard & Bob Callahan	
2919	Ship Ahoy	© March 12, 1929	Doc Salomon (director); Arthur "Pat" West, Sidney Dalbrock & Harris Gordon	Vitaphone Varieties 1926-30 (Warner Archive) DVD
2920	The Sideshow	© March 20, 1929	Doc Salomon (director); Jack Born & Elmer Lawrence	
2940	Pigskin Troubles	© March 7, 1929	Jack Born & Elmer Lawrence	Vitaphone Varieties 1926-30 (Warner Archive) DVD
2968	Guido Deiro, World's Foremost Piano-Accordionist	© March 20, 1929	Guido Diero	Vitaphone Varieties Vol. 2 (Warner Archive) DVD
702 (NYC)	Eddie Lambert, America's Foremost Concert Pianist	© January 28, 1929	Eddie Lambert	
703 (NYC)	Frank Whitman, the Surprising Fiddler	© January 22, 1929	Bryan Foy (director); Frank Whitman	Vitaphone Varieties 1926-30 (Warner Archive) DVD
704 (NYC)	Jack Goldie, the Ace of Spades	© January 28, 1929	Bryan Foy (director); Jack Goldie	

=== 1929 ===
Filmed in 1929 in Hollywood (LA) and Brooklyn (NYC).

#	Title	Release, copyright or review date	Performers (and credited director)	Notes
(NYC)	Jan Gerber & His Little Club Orchestra	January 1929	Jan Gerber	
2570 (NYC)	Glorifying the Popular Song	© October 29, 1929	Murray Roth (director); Ruth Etting	
2575 (NYC)	John Miller and James Mack, the Bing Boys	January 1929	John Miller & James Mack	
2590 (NYC)	Joe E. Brown Personal Appearance Trailer	May 1929	Joe E. Brown	
451 (NYC)	Madame Frances Alda	© August 30, 1929	Murray Roth (director); Frances Alda	
705 (NYC)	Lerdo's Mexican Orchestra	© March 19, 1929		
706 (NYC)	Tajado's Tipica Orchestra	© March 20, 1929		
707 (NYC)	Mexican Tipica Orchestra	© February 15, 1929		
708 (NYC)	Back from Abroad	© March 9, 1929	McKay & Ardine	
709 (NYC)	Sol Violinsky, the Eccentric Entertainer	© September 28, 1929	Sol Violinsky	The Jazz Singer DVD
710 (NYC)	Green's Twentieth Century Faydetts	© March 20, 1929	Charles Green, Nina Grey	The Jazz Singer DVD
711 (NYC)	Green's Flapperettes	© March 7, 1929		
712 (NYC)	Songs As You Like Them	© February 25, 1929	Jim & Betty Morgan	
713 (NYC)	Frances Shelley, the Girl with the Guitar	© February 15, 1929	Frances Shelley	
714 (NYC)	A Few Absurd Moments	© March 12, 1929	Stanley & Ginger	
715 (NYC)	The Original Hillbillies	© March 7, 1929	The "North Carolina Jazz Band" featuring Al Hopkins	
716 (NYC)	Miss Marcelle Singing Southern Syncopated Songs	© March 20, 1929	Miss Marcelle	
717 (NYC)	A Journey of Songs	© March 19, 1929	Jay Velie	
718 (NYC)	Songs of Love	© March 7, 1929	Jay Velie	
719 (NYC)	Blondes That Gentlemen Prefer	February 24, 1929 (Film Daily review)	Neal Sisters	
720 (NYC)	The Corner Store	© March 20, 1929	Murray Roth (director); Fred Ardath	
721 (NYC)	Fannie Ward the Miracle Woman	March 24, 1929 (Film Daily review)	Fannie Ward	
722-723 (NYC, two-reeler)	The Music Makers	April 7, 1929	Bryan Foy (director); Willie and Eugene Howard	
724 (NYC)	A Bad Boy from a Good Family	© March 12, 1929	Phil Baker	
725 (NYC)	In Spain	© March 12, 1929	Phil Baker	
726 (NYC)	Mirth and Melody	© March 7, 1929	Dorothy & Rosetta Ryan	
727 (NYC)	Frank Crumit, the One Man Glee Club	© March 19, 1929	Frank Crumit	
728 (NYC)	Stella Mayhew, the Hallelujah Lady	© March 20, 1929	Stella Mayhew	
729 (NYC)	Mal Hallett and His Entertaining Orchestra	March 3, 1929 (Film Daily review)	Mal Hallet & Orchestra	
730 (NYC)	Mal Hallett and His Way Down East Band	July 28, 1929 (Film Daily review)	Mal Hallet & Orchestra	
731 (NYC)	Musical Moments	© March 19, 1929	The Four Synco-Pets	
732 (NYC)	Tal Henry and His North Carolinians	© April 10, 1929	Tal Henry	Vitaphone Cavalcade of Musical Comedy Shorts (Warner Archive) DVD
733 (NYC)	Words of Love	© March 20, 1929	Julia Sanderson & Frank Crumit	
734 (NYC)	A Traffic Muddle	© April 30, 1929	Red Donahue & U-No the Mule	
735 (NYC)	June, the English Musical Comedy Star, with John Hundley	© March 19, 1929		
736 (NYC)	Paul Cunningham and Florence Bennett, the Popular Singing Composers	© March 20, 1929	Paul Cunningham & Florence Bennett	
739 (NYC)	Grace La Rue, the International Star of Song	© April 30, 1929	Grace La Rue	
740 (NYC)	Hope Hampton (in the First Act of Manon)	March 31, 1929 (Film Daily review)	Hope Hampton	
741 (NYC)	Song Sayings	© April 10, 1929	George Whiting & Sadie Burt with Edmund Weber (piano)	
742 (NYC)	Paul Tremaine & His Aristocrats	March 31, 1929 (Film Daily review)	Paul Tremaine and His Jazz Band	The Jazz Singer DVD
743-744 (NYC, two-reeler)	The Squarer	February 1929	Bryan Foy (director); J.C. Nugent with Natalie Shafer & Percy Helton	
745 (NYC)	Max Schmeling, Heavyweight Champion of Germany	© April 10, 1929	Max Schmeling	
746 (NYC)	Eleanor Painter, the Lyric Soprano	March 31, 1929 (Film Daily review)	Eleanor Painter	
747, 748 & 749 (NYC)	Isa Kremer	© April 9, 1929	Isa Kremer	(three similar titled film shorts released separately)
750-751 (NYC, two-reeler)	My People	© July 22, 1929	Willie and Eugene Howard	
752 (NYC)	Bernie Cummins and His Biltmore Orchestra	© April 10, 1929	Bernie Cummins	
753 (NYC)	At the Seashore	© May 4, 1929	Ethel Sinclair & Marge LaMarr	The Jazz Singer DVD
754-755 (NYC, two-reeler)	Motoring	© July 22, 1929	Harry Tate	
757 (NYC)	A Bird in the Hand	© April 30, 1929	Bryan Foy (director); Ann Codee & Frank Orth	Vitaphone Varieties 1926-30 (Warner Archive) DVD
758 (NYC)	Americanische Lieder	March 1929	Ann Codee	
759 (NYC)	Ann Codee dans "Des Melodies Americainers"	March 1929	Ann Codee	
760 (NYC)	Evening At Home with Hitchy	© April 17, 1929	Raymond Hitchcock	
761-762 (NYC, two-reeler)	The Man Who Laughed Last	© September 7, 1929	Bryan Foy (director); Sessue Hayakawa	
763 (NYC)	Harry Horlick and His A&P Gypsies	April 7, 1929 (Film Daily review)	Murray Roth (director); Accompanied by Frank Parker & Valerie Bergere	
764-765 (NYC, two-reeler)	The Woman Tamer	March 1929	Bryan Foy (director); J.C. Nugent with Natalie Schaefer & Percy Helton	
766 (NYC)	Clarence Tisdale, Southland's Spiritual Tenor (Old-Time Songs)	© May 12, 1929	Clarence Tisdale	
767 (NYC)	The Patent Office	© June 29, 1929	Harry Tate	
769 (NYC)	Playmates	© April 30, 1929	Bryan Foy (director); Arthur & Morton Havel with Dora Mills Adams & David Bender	
770 (NYC)	Rhythms	© June 1, 1929	Leo Reisman & His Hotel Brunswick Orchestra	Vitaphone Cavalcade of Musical Comedy Shorts (Warner Archive) DVD
771 (NYC)	Rudy Vallee and His Connecticut Yankees	Murray Roth (director); March 31, 1929 (Film Daily review)	Rudy Vallée	
772-773 (NYC, two-reeler)	The Veteran	March 1929	Bryan Foy (director); J.C. Nugent	
774 (NYC)	Josie Heather, the Character Comedienne	© May 12, 1929	Murray Roth (director); Josie Heather	
775 (NYC)	Fresh from Hollywood	© May 12, 1929	Jimmy Duffy & Helen Gleason	
776 (NYC)	The Ninety-Ninth Amendment	© May 18, 1929	Bryan Foy (director); Hugh O’Connell, Charles Richman & Verree Teasdale	
777 (NYC)	Irene Franklin, the American Comedienne	May 12, 1929	Murray Roth (director); Irene Franklin & Jerry Jarnagin	
778 (NYC)	Selling a Car	© July 23, 1929	Harry Tate	
780 (NYC)	Three O'Clock in the Morning	© May 27, 1929	George Broadhurst & Co. (Harold Bolton, Eleanor Cody & Phil Raymond)	
781 (NYC)	Eva Shirley and Her Versatile Band	April 1929	Murray Roth (director); Eva Shirley, Gil Lamb, Ray Block, Willie Fratkin & the Two Sammys	
782 (NYC)	The Outlaw In-Law	© August 7, 1929	Bryan Foy & Murray Roth (directors); Hobart Cavanaugh & Mary Loane	
783 (NYC)	At the Party	© June 12, 1929	Bryan Foy (director); Bud Harris & Frank Radcliffe	Vitaphone Varieties 1926-30 (Warner Archive) DVD
784 (NYC)	Pageant of the Lilliputians	June 9, 1929 (Film Daily review)	Bryan Foy (director); Tiny Town Revue with Buster Shaver	
785 (NYC)	The Singing Bee	© May 27, 1929	Bryan Foy (director); Fred Ardath with Klar Magnus, Claude Allen & Audrey St. Claire	
786 (NYC)	These Dry Days	© August 30, 1929	Fred Ardath	Vitaphone Varieties 1926-30 (Warner Archive) DVD
787 (NYC)	Odds and Ends	© May 27, 1929	Mr. & Mrs. Jack Norworth	
788 (NYC)	Typical Types	© June 1, 1929	Murray Roth (director); Bobby Folsom	
789 (NYC)	Beau Night	© June 12, 1929	Murray Roth (director); El Brendel & Flo Bert	
790 (NYC)	The Family Ford	May 1929	Bryan Foy (director); Jim Harkins with Marian Harkins, Hope Eden, Harry Lester and Marie Dolan	
791 (NYC)	Jack White with the Montrealers	© May 27, 1929	Bryan Foy (director); Jack White, Mary Lee, Billie Lee & Ruth Petty	Vitaphone Varieties 1926-30 (Warner Archive) DVD
792 (NYC)	Cecilia Leftus in Her Famous Impersonations	© May 27, 1929	Cecilia Leftus	
793 (NYC)	Don Alberto y su Orquestra Argentina	April 1929	Bryan Foy (director); Don Alberto, Genaro Viega (singer), Epaim Suares (on violin) & Celestino Bianchi (on accordion)	
794 (NYC)	Palm Beach Four "Favorite Nightclub Quartette"	© May 27, 1929	Murray Roth (director); accompanied by Charles Anderson, Joseph Markese, Harry Hill & Al Perry	
795 (NYC)	The Blue Ridgers with Cordelia Mayberry	© June 12, 1929	Murray Roth (director); Sam Morley, Jim & Pete Holy, Dan & Cordelia Mayberry	
796 (NYC)	Roy Sedley and His Night Club Revue	© June 1, 1929	Murray Roth (director); accompanied by Berth Miller & Billy Smith	
797 (NYC)	Albert Spalding Playing "Ave Maria" by Shubert & "Waltz in A" by Brahms	© September 7, 1929	Murray Roth (director); Albert Spalding (violinist) & André Benoist	
798 (NYC)	Albert Spalding Playing "Minuet in B" by Mozart & "Liebesfreud" by Kreisler	© July 22, 1929	Harold Levey (director); Albert Spalding (violinist) & André Benoist	
799 (NYC)	Albert Spalding Playing Schumann's "Traumere" & Sarasate's "Romanza Andaluza"	© November 7, 1929	Harold Levey (director); Albert Spalding (violinist) & André Benoist	
800 (NYC)	Albert Spalding Playing Kreisler's "Liebeslied" & Raff's "Cavitina"	© September 7, 1929	Harold Levey (director); Albert Spalding (violinist) & André Benoist	
801 (NYC)	Albert Spalding Playing Alabama & Chopin's "Valse in G Flat"	© June 12, 1929	Harold Levey (director); Albert Spalding (violinist) & André Benoist	
802 (NYC)	Albert Spalding	© November 7, 1929	Albert Spalding (violinist) & André Benoinst (piano)	
803 (NYC)	Sympathy	© August 30, 1929	Murray Roth (director); Hobart Cavanaugh, Regina Wallace, Harry Shannon & others	Vitaphone Varieties 1926-30 (Warner Archive) DVD
804 (NYC)	The Varsity Three "Blue Streaks of Rhythm"	© June 12, 1929	Harold Levey (director); Jack Hauser, Robert Hauser & pianist Jack Bloom	
806 (NYC)	Blanche Ring	April 1929	Bryan Foy (director); Blanche Ring, Charles Rand & Cyril Ring	
807 (NYC)	The Familiar Face	June 9, 1929 (Film Daily review)	Arthur Hurley (director); Russel Crouse (story); Hugh O’Connell with Granville Bates, Frank Rowan & William Shelley	
808 (NYC)	Jeanne Gordon, the Celebrated Mezzo Soprano	May 1929	Murray Roth (director); Jeanne Gordon	
809 (NYC)	Baby Rose Marie, the Child Wonder	© June 12, 1929	Bryan Foy (director); Rose Marie	The Jazz Singer DVD
810 (NYC)	Oklahoma Bob Albright & His Rodeo Do Flappers	© June 12, 1929	Murray Roth (director); Bob Albright	Vitaphone Varieties 1926-30 (Warner Archive) DVD
811 (NYC)	The Gay Nineties or, the Unfaithful Husband	© July 22, 1929	Murray Roth (director); Larry Bolton, Lenita Lane, Elizabeth Patterson, Sidney Toler & Eunice Howard	
812 (NYC)	The Dinner Party	May 1929	Arthur Hurley (director); Stanley Ridges, Florence Vernon & Daisy Atherton	
813 (NYC)	High Water, A Song Poem of the Southland	June 9, 1929 (Film Daily review)	Murray Roth (director); Guy Robertson with Marsh McGurdy (piano)	
815 (NYC)	Charles C. Peterson - Billiard Champion of Fancy Shots	© August 30, 1929	Murray Roth (director); Charles C. Peterson	Vitaphone Varieties 1926-30 (Warner Archive) DVD
816 (NYC)	He's a Devil	© June 29, 1929	Murray Roth (director); Roy & Dot Dean	
817 (NYC)	Kate Smith, Songbird of the South	© June 29, 1929	Murray Roth (director); Kate Smith	
818 (NYC)	The All Girl Revue	June 9, 1929 (Film Daily review)	Murray Roth (director); Betty Lou Webb, Lillian Price, Jean Rankin's Bluebells, the Malenoff Trio, Terry Green, Ellen Bunting, DePaco & Kazviki	
819 (NYC)	The Man About Town	© July 22, 1929	Murray Roth (director); Frank X. Silk with Fred Sumner	
820-821 (NYC)	Small Timers	© October 14, 1929	Bert Wheeler with Bernice Speer & Al Clair	
822 (NYC)	John Steel, the Musical Comedy Star	May 1929	Murray Roth (director); John Steel, Allen Parade (piano)	
823 (NYC)	Segar Ellis and His Embassy Club Orchestra	© July 31, 1929	Murray Roth (director); Seger Ellis	
824 (NYC)	Dooley's the Name	© July 31, 1929	Murray Roth (director); Francis Dooley & Corinne Sales	Vitaphone Varieties 1926-30 (Warner Archive) DVD
825 (NYC)	Cora Green, the Famous Creole Singer	© August 20, 1929	Murray Roth (director); Cora Green, pianist Isadore Myer	
826 (NYC)	Mel Klee, the Prince of Wails	© August 30, 1929	Murray Roth (director); Mel Klee	Vitaphone Varieties 1926-30 (Warner Archive) DVD
827 (NYC)	Harlem-Mania	© July 22, 1929	Murray Roth (director);The Norman Thomas Quintette, Earl Shanks, Stanley Brown, Alphonse Kennedy & Freddie Crump (on drums)	Vitaphone Varieties Vol. 2 (Warner Archive) DVD
828 (NYC)	Harry Fox & His Six American Beauties	© July 22, 1929	Murray Roth (director); Harry Fox	Vitaphone Varieties 1926-30 (Warner Archive) DVD
829 (NYC)	The Bee & the Fox	© July 23, 1929	Murray Roth (director); Harry Fox & Bea Curtis	Vitaphone Varieties 1926-30 (Warner Archive) DVD
831 (NYC)	Alexander Moissi, Europe's Greatest Actor	(not released?)	Arthur Hurley (director); Alexander Moissi	
832 (NYC)	The Gotham Rhythm Boys	© September 28, 1929	Murray Roth (director); Eddie Lewis, Tom Miller & Lou Monte	Vitaphone Varieties 1926-30 (Warner Archive) DVD
833 (NYC)	You Don't Know the Half of It	© December 9, 1929	Murray Roth (director); Jay Brennan & Ann Butler	Vitaphone Varieties Vol. 2 (Warner Archive) DVD
834 (NYC)	The Opry House	© August 20, 1929	Murray Roth (director); Doris Walker & the Mound City Blue Blowers (Lou Hearn, William McKenzie, Frank Billings, Jack Bland & Carl Kress)	Vitaphone Cavalcade of Musical Comedy Shorts (Warner Archive) DVD
835 (NYC)	Hilda	© August 20, 1929	Murray Roth (director); Billy "Swede" Hall & Co.	Vitaphone Varieties 1926-30 (Warner Archive) DVD
836 (NYC)	Harry Rosenthal and His Bath and Tennis Club Orchestra	© August 20, 1929	Bryan Foy (director); Harry Rosenthal, Jean Ackerman, Hazel Forbes, Myra Darby, Evelyn Groves, Mary Mulhern, Mildred LeGay, Gen Pearson, Murray Smith, Dare & Belmonte, Cornell Smelser & Jack Scheer	
837 (NYC)	Reva Reyes, the Piquant Senorita	June 1929	Murray Roth (director); accompanied by Guillermo Plaza (piano)	
838 (NYC)	The Interview	© August 30, 1929	Arthur Hurley (director); Russel Crouse (story); Hugh O’Connell with Granville Bates & Don Dilloway	
839 (NYC)	Just Like a Man	© August 30, 1929	Arthur Hurley (director); John Hobble	
840 (NYC)	The Big Paraders	© August 20, 1929	Murray Roth (director); Charlotte Conrad, Tiny & Jack Waites, Elsie Thiel, Edna Howard & Ben Wise	Vitaphone Varieties Vol. 3 (Warner Archive) DVD
841 (NYC)	Don't Get Nervous	July 28, 1929 (Film Daily review)	Bryan Foy (director); Georgie Price	Vitaphone Varieties Vol. 2 (Warner Archive) DVD
842 (NYC)	James J. Corbett and Neil O'Brien	© August 9, 1929	Murray Roth (director); James J. Corbett, Neil O'Brien	
843 (NYC)	You Tell 'em, I Stutter	released?	Murray Roth (director); Harry Savoy & Ruth Mann	
844 (NYC)	Jack White and His Chateau Madrid Club Entertainers	© August 20, 1929	Jack White & Jeanne Fayal	
845 (NYC)	Joe College (Two College Nuts)	© August 20, 1929	Murray Roth (director); Billy Edison & Charlie Gregory	Vitaphone Varieties Vol. 3 (Warner Archive) DVD
846 (NYC)	Frances Shelley and the Four Eton Boys	July 28, 1929 (Film Daily review)	Frances Shelley, Charlie & Jack Day, Eddie Murray & Earl Smith	
847 (NYC)	Rarin' to Go	© August 20, 1929	Bryan Foy (director); Jack Kraft & Elsie Lamont	Vitaphone Varieties Vol. 2 (Warner Archive) DVD
848 (NYC)	Carolina Segrera "The Cuban Nightingale" with Don Alberto and His Argentines	July 1929	Murray Roth (director); Carolina Segrera, Don Alberto, Gennaro Viega, Epaim Suarez & Celestino Bianchi	Vitaphone Varieties Vol. 3 (Warner Archive) DVD
849 (NYC)	Satires	© September 7, 1929	Murray Roth (director); John T. Murray & Vivien Oakland	Vitaphone Varieties 1926-30 (Warner Archive) DVD
850 (NYC)	Moving Day	© November 7, 1929	Bryan Foy (director); Frank Hunter, Mae Percival & Charles Wesson	
861 (NYC)	Marching Home with Douglas Stanbury and His Veterans	August 18, 1929 (Film Daily review)	Murray Roth (director); Edward DuParr (camera); Douglas Stanbury	
862 (NYC)	They Know Their Groceries	August 30, 1929	Bryan Foy (director); Flournoy Miller & Aubrey Lyles with Vivienne Baber, Onion Jeffrey, Paul Floyd & Oswald Lyles	
863 (NYC)	Nan Halperin, America's Famous Satirist	© September 7, 1929	Murray Roth (director); Nan Halperin	
864 (NYC)	Carlena Diamond, Harpist Supreme	© September 7, 1929	Murray Roth (director); Carlena Diamond	Vitaphone Varieties 1926-30 (Warner Archive) DVD
865 (NYC)	Those Were the Days	© November 7, 1929	Irene Franklin	
866 (NYC)	Fishing Around	© September 28, 1929	Murray Roth (director); Howard Anderson, Rean? Graves & Cole Carroll	Vitaphone Varieties 1926-30 (Warner Archive) DVD
867 (NYC)	Before the Bar	© September 7, 1929	Murray Roth (director); Frank Hurst & Eddie Vogt	
869 (NYC)	Grace Johnston and The Indiana Five	© September 7, 1929	Murray Roth (director); Grace Johnston	Vitaphone Varieties Vol. 2 (Warner Archive) DVD
870 (NYC)	Red Nichols and His Five Pennies	© September 16, 1929	Murray Roth (director); Red Nichols with Eddie Condon	Vitaphone Cavalcade of Musical Comedy Shorts (Warner Archive) DVD
871 (NYC)	Diamond Til	September 1, 1929 (Film Daily review)	Grace Hayes & Neville Fleeson	
872 (NYC)	Ben Pollack and His Park Central Orchestra	© September 14, 1929	Bryan Foy (director); Ben Pollack	
873 (NYC)	Somewhere in Jersey	© September 28, 1929	Bryan Foy (director); William Halligan & Mary Mulhern	
874 (NYC)	Coletta Ryan and Duke Yellman (aka "Songology")	© September 14, 1929	Bryan Foy (director); Coletta Ryan & Duke Yellman	Vitaphone Varieties 1926-30 (Warner Archive) DVD
875 (NYC)	Dave Apollon and His Russian Stars	© September 7, 1929	Bryan Foy (director); Dave Apollon	
876 (NYC)	Guido Ciccolini and Eric Zardo	© September 28, 1929	Murray Roth (director); Guido Ciccolini, Eric Zardo & Joan Ruth	
878 (NYC)	The Kiddie Cabaret	© October 14, 1929	Murray Roth (director); Sybil Lee, Peggy & Dorothy Delight, Buddy Reed, Lenora Bohen, Glauco D'Attilli & Yukona Cameron	
879 (NYC)	Harlem Knights	© December 9, 1929	Flournoy Miller & Aubrey Lyles	
880 (NYC)	Sending a Wire	© September 28, 1929	Murray Roth (director); Eddie Green with Jimmy Baskett & Noma Davis	
881 (NYC)	The One Man Quartette	© November 7, 1929	Murray Roth (director); Eddie Miller	
882 (NYC)	Moments in Mimicry	© October 14, 1929	Murray Roth (director); Roger Williams	
883 (NYC)	Just Dumb	© October 14, 1929	Murray Roth (director); Nelson B. Clifford & Marie Marion	
884 (NYC)	Shake It Up	© November 7, 1929	Murray Roth (director); Eddie Moran, Beth Challis & Their Cheerful Steppers	
885 (NYC)	Music Hath Charms	© October 14, 1929	Murray Roth (director); Frank Orth & Ann Codee with Florence Vernon	
886 (NYC)	Des Nouvelles Chansons Americaines	August 1929	Arthur Hurley (director); Ann Codee & Frank Orth	
887 (NYC)	Meine Frau	August 1929	Murray Roth (director); Ann Codee & Frank Orth with Walter Dreher	
888 (NYC)	A Tete-a-Tete in Songs	© October 14, 1929	Murray Roth (director); James Burke & Eleanor Durkin	
889 (NYC)	The Hall of Injustice	© October 14, 1929	John T. Murray & Vivien Oakland	
890 (NYC)	Charles Hackett Singing "I Looked Into Your Garden" & "I Heard You Singing"	September 1929	Arthur Hurley (director); Charles Hackett	
891 (NYC)	Lambchops	October 14, 1929	Murray Roth (director); George Burns & Gracie Allen	The Jazz Singer DVD
892 (NYC)	Josef Kallini "Foremost Tenor of the Manhattan Opera House"	August 1929	Arthur Hurley (director); Josef Kallini, Aaron Pressman	
893 (NYC)	Josef Kallini (#893)	August 1929	Arthur Hurley (director); Josef Kallini	
894 (NYC)	Ruth Etting, the Sweetheart of Columbia Records, Glorifying the Popular Song	October 9, 1929	Murray Roth (director); Ruth Etting, Victor Arden & Phil Ohman	
895 (NYC)	Dead or Alive	© December 10, 1929	Arthur Hurley; story: Russel Crouse; Hugh O’Connell with Granville Bates & William Shelley	
896 (NYC)	A Night on the Bowery	October 20, 1929 (Film Daily review)	Murray Roth (director); Will Aubrey	
897-898 (NYC, two-reeler)	In the Nick of Time	© December 31, 1929	Murray Roth (director); Sidney Toler with Lucy Beaumont, Bert Wilson & Dorothy Hall	
899-900 (NYC, two-reeler)	Charles Hackett in "Faust" assisted by Chase Borromeo	December 8, 1929 (Film Daily review)	Arthur Hurley (director); Charles Hackett	
901 (NYC)	Two Good Boys Gone Wrong	© October 29, 1929	Murray Roth (director); Jans & Whalen	Vitaphone Varieties 1926-30 (Warner Archive) DVD
902 (NYC)	Horace Heidt & His Californians	© October 28, 1929	Murray Roth (director); Horace Heidt, Lee Lykins (vocalist)	
903 (NYC)	Fred Allen's Prize Playlets	© November 25, 1929	Murray Roth (director); Fred Allen	Vitaphone Varieties Vol. 2 (Warner Archive) DVD
904-905 (NYC)	Faint Heart	© December 21, 1929	Murray Roth (director); Bert Lahr with Bobbe Arnst, Harry Shannon & Malcolm Duncan	Vitaphone Varieties Vol. 2 (Warner Archive) DVD
906 (NYC)	Chistes y Lasses	September 1929	Arthur Hurley (director); Tex McLeod & Marjorie Tiller	
907 (NYC)	Illusions	© November 25, 1929	Murray Roth (director?); Fred Keaton	
908 (NYC)	Horace Heidt & His Californians	February 2, 1930 (Film Daily review)	Murray Roth (director); Horace Heidt	Vitaphone Varieties Vol. 3 (Warner Archive) DVD
909 (NYC)	A Glimpse of the Stars	© December 21, 1929	Murray Roth (director); Paula Trueman	
910 (NYC)	The Fallen Star	© November 29, 1929	Murray Roth (director); George Rosener	
911 (NYC)	Marie Vero	September 1929	Arthur Hurley (director); Marie Veno, Helen Whitaker (piano)	
912 (NYC)	A Song Drama	© December 9, 1929	Murray Roth (director); Charles Derickson & Burton Brown	
913 (NYC)	Rhythms in Blue	© November 29, 1929	Murray Roth (director); Bobbe Arnst & Peggy Ellis	Vitaphone Varieties Vol. 3 (Warner Archive) DVD
914 (NYC)	Low-down, a Bird's Eye View of Harlem	© December 21, 1929	Murray Roth (director); Monette Moore, Gertie Chambers, Mary Burnes & Washboard Serenaders	
915 (NYC)	Who's Who	© November 25, 1929	Arthur Hurley (director); Harry Lang & Bernice Healy	
916 (NYC)	Charles Hackett Singing "Il Mio Tesoro Instanto" & "O Paradiso"	November 25, 1929	Arthur Hurley (director); Charles Hackett	
917 (NYC)	Molly Picon, the Celebrated Character Comedienne	© December 21, 1929	Murray Roth (director); Molly Picon	Vitaphone Varieties Vol. 3 (Warner Archive) DVD
918 (NYC)	Pack Up Your Troubles	October 20, 1929 (Film Daily review)	Murray Roth (director); Douglas Stanbury & the Lyric Quartette with Jack Burns	Vitaphone Varieties 1926-30 (Warner Archive) DVD
919 (NYC)	Little Miss Everybody	November 24, 1929 (Film Daily review)	Murray Roth (director); Zelda Santley	Vitaphone Varieties Vol. 3 (Warner Archive) DVD
920 (NYC)	Apartment Hunting	© November 29, 1929	Arthur Hurley (director); George Fisher & Honey Hurst	
921-922 (NYC, two-reeler)	Room 909	November 3, 1929 (Film Daily review)	Murray Roth (director); Edward DuParr (camera); Robert Emmet Keane & Claire Whitney	
923 (NYC)	The Midnight Lodge	© January 15, 1930	Flournoy Miller & Aubrey Lyles	
924 (NYC)	For Goodness Sake!	October 1929	Murray Roth (director); Sidney Marion & Adele Jason	
925 (NYC)	Bigger and Better	© December 23, 1929	Murray Roth (director); Fanny & Kitty Watson	
926-927 (NYC, two-reeler)	The Under Dog	© January 15, 1930	Fred Allen (writer); James Barton	
928 (NYC)	Crinoline Classics	© December 23, 1929	Murray Roth (director); Helen Yorke & Virginia Johnson	
929 (NYC)	Some Pumpkins	© December 21, 1929	Murray Roth (director); Sam Summers & Estelle Hunt	Vitaphone Varieties Vol. 3 (Warner Archive) DVD
930-931 (NYC, two-reeler)	Hello Thar!	© January 13, 1930	Murray Roth (director); Eddie Buzzell	
932 (NYC)	Giovanni Martinelli and Livia Maracci	December 15, 1929 (Film Daily review)	Arthur Hurley (director); Giovanni Martinelli	
933 (NYC)	Herschel Henlere, the Madcap Musician	© January 18, 1930	Murray Roth (director); Herschel Henlere	Vitaphone Varieties Vol. 3 (Warner Archive) DVD
934 (NYC)	The Letter Box	© December 31, 1929	Arthur Hurley (director); Sybil Lee, Burke Clark, Harold Kennedy & others	
935 (NYC)	Impressions	© January 25, 1930	Murray Roth (director); Albert Carroll	
936 (NYC)	The Musicale	© January 15, 1930	Murray Roth (director); Al Trahan with Yukona Cameron & Helen Hawley	Vitaphone Varieties Vol. 3 (Warner Archive) DVD
937 (NYC)	Then and Now	© January 15, 1930	Murray Roth (director); Billy & Elsa Newell	
938 (NYC)	Imagine My Embarrassment	© January 18, 1930	Murray Roth (director); Frank Orth & Ann Codee	A German version was also made (Vitaphone #942)
939 (NYC)	The Benefit	February 2, 1930 (Film Daily review)	Murray Roth (director); Joe Frisco	
940 (NYC)	Rose Perfect, the Girl With the Golden Voice	© January 15, 1930	Murray Roth (director); accompanied by Dudley Wilkinson (piano)	
941 (NYC)	Jest for a While	© January 15, 1930	Murray Roth (director); Clara Barry & Orval Whitledge	Vitaphone Varieties Vol. 3 (Warner Archive) DVD
943 (NYC)	Ave Maria	January 5, 1930 (Film Daily review)	Arthur Hurley (director); Giovanni Martinelli & Frances Alda	
944 (NYC)	Giovanni Martinelli Singing Arias from "Verdis Il Trovatore"	© January 18, 1930	Arthur Hurley (director); Giovanni Martinelli	
945 (NYC)	Two of a Kind	© January 18, 1930	Arthur Hurley (director); Billy Lytell & Tom Fant	
946 (NYC)	Oh Sarah!	© January 25, 1930	Murray Roth (director); Jack McLallen & Sarah Carson with Tony Labriola	
947 (NYC)	The Operation	February 9, 1930 (Film Daily review)	Murray Roth (director); Edgar Bergen, Charlie McCarthy & Christina Graver	Vitaphone Varieties Vol. 2 (Warner Archive) DVD
948 (NYC)	Une Chanson Mimee	December 1929	Arthur Hurley (director); Ann Codee with Joe Cappo & Marion Lessing	
949 (NYC)	Sound Effects	© February 17, 1930	Murray Roth (director); Buddy Traps	
950 (NYC)	Talking It Over	© March 15, 1930	Murray Roth (director); Jack Osterman	Vitaphone Varieties Vol. 2 (Warner Archive) DVD
951 (NYC)	A Perfect Understanding	© February 17, 1930	Murray Roth (director); Joe May & Dorothy Oaks	
952 (NYC)	On the Rancho	© February 17, 1930	Murray Roth & Arthur Hurley (directors); Will & Gladys Ahern with Ben Ahern	
953 (NYC)	Giovanni Martinelli Singing "Céleste Aïda"	© December 21, 1929	Arthur Hurley (director); Giovanni Martinelli	
954 (NYC)	Idle Chatter	© March 15, 1930	Murray Roth (director); Lou Holtz	Vitaphone Varieties Vol. 2 (Warner Archive) DVD
955 (NYC)	The Love Boat	© March 15, 1930	Murray Roth (director); Herman Timberg	
956 (NYC)	Scotch Taffy	December 1929	Edmund Joseph (director); Scott Sanders	Vitaphone Varieties Vol. 2 (Warner Archive) DVD
957 (NYC)	Jane Dillon and Her Boy Friends	December 1929	Edmund Joseph (director); Jane Dillon	
958 (NYC)	Ben Bernie and His Orchestra	© May 16, 1930	Murray Roth (director); Ben Bernie, Clayton, Jackson & Jimmy Durante, Pat Kennedy & Frances McCoy	Vitaphone Varieties Vol. 3 (Warner Archive) DVD
959 (NYC)	Ruth Breton, the Celebrated Violinist	© February 17, 1930	Arthur Hurley (director); Rith Breton, Rudolfo Noyos (vocalist) & "Miss" Baker (piano)	
960 (NYC)	Broadway's Like That	© March 15, 1930	Arthur Hurley & Murray Roth (directors); Ruth Etting, Joan Blondell, Humphrey Bogart & Mary Philips	
3636 (LA)	Stimulation	© December 31, 1929	Johnny Arthur	
3179–3180 (LA, two-reeler)	Finders Keepers	© November 25, 1929	Bryan Foy & George Kelly (directors); Helen Ferguson, John Litel & Janet Adair	
3190 (LA)	The Frame	© April 30, 1930	William Boyd & Charles Middleton	
3238–3239 (LA, two-reeler)	The Flattering Word	© November 25, 1929	Bryan Foy (director); George Kelly, Harrison Ford, Janet Adair, Blanche Frederici & John Litel	
3280 (LA)	At the Church Festival	© November 25, 1929	Wright & Louis? Silvers (directors); Dick Henderson	
3289–3290 (LA, two-reeler)	All Square	© January 15, 1930		
3300 (LA)	Head of the Family	© December 31, 1929	Little Billy	
3333 (LA)	The Dead Line	© November 25, 1929	Bryan Foy (director); David Callis, Blanche Friderici & Jimmy Phillips	
3334 (LA)	Always Faithful	December 31, 1929	George Middleton (director); Blanche Sweet, John Litel & others	Vitaphone Varieties Vol. 2 (Warner Archive) DVD
3335 (LA)	For Sale	© November 25, 1929	Bryan Foy (director); Gregory Ratoff	Vitaphone Varieties Vol. 2 (Warner Archive) DVD
3413 (LA)	The Music Shop	© December 31, 1929	Dick Henderson	
3640 (LA)	The Barber Shop Chord	© November 25, 1929	Martie Martel & others	
3667 (LA)	White Lies	© December 31, 1929		
3668 (LA)	The Window Cleaners	© April 7, 1930	Neely Edwards & Lew Brice	
3674–3675 (LA, 15 minutes)	Poor Aubrey	© January 30, 1930	Franklin Pangborn, Helen Ferguson, Ruth Lyons & Clara Blandick	Vitaphone Varieties 1926-30 (Warner Archive) DVD
3676 (LA)	And Wife	© April 30, 1930	William McCann (director); Frank Davis & Bernice Elliott	
3679 (LA)	Revival Day	January 5, 1930 (Film Daily review)	Roy Mack (director) & Tenny Wright (directors); Slim Timblin, Bobby Arnst & Peggy Ellis	Vitaphone Varieties 1926-30 (Warner Archive) DVD
3680 (LA)	The Maid's Night Out	© December 31, 1929	Bobby Watson	
3681 (LA)	More Sinned Against Than Usual	© January 30, 1930	Howard Bretherton	
3722 (LA)	Trifles	© January 30, 1930	Jason Robards, Sr., Sarah Padden, Blanche Friderici & Frank Campeau	Vitaphone Varieties 1926-30 (Warner Archive) DVD
3740 (LA)	Christmas Knight	© April 30, 1930	C.B. Platts (director); Bryant Washburn, Helen Jerome Eddy & Charles Middleton	
3757 (LA)	Mechant Mais Gentil	December 1929	Georges Carpentier	
3759 (LA)	A Matter of Ethics	© February 17, 1930	Howard Bretherton	
3761 (LA)	Naughty But Nice	© March 30, 1930	Georges Carpentier	
3762 (LA)	The Stand Up	© February 17, 1930	Wilbur Mack, Bobby Watson & Marjorie Lane	
3780 (LA)	Vanity	© January 30, 1930	Ruth Lyons, Rudolph Cameron & Vivien Oakland	
3781 (LA)	The People Versus--	© April 30, 1930	Patrick H. O'Malley, Jr. & Frank Campeau	
3816 (LA)	Jack Buchanan with the Glee Quartet	© February 17, 1930	Jack Buchanan	The Band Wagon DVD & Vitaphone Cavalcade of Musical Comedy Shorts (Warner Archive) DVD
3825 (LA)	Letters	© February 17, 1930	John G. Adolfi (director); Pauline Garon, Natalie Moorhead, Kathryn Givney & William B. Davidson	

=== 1930 ===
Filmed in 1930 in Hollywood (LA) and Brooklyn (NYC).

#	Title	Release, copyright or review date	Director & performers	Notes
3529 (LA)	Danger	© March 15, 1930	Eddie Cline (director); John Litel, Frank Campeau & Charlotte Merriam	
3686 (LA)	The New Racket	© June 11, 1930	John G. Adolfi (director); Gardner James, James Bradbury Jr., Irene Homer & DeWitt Jennings	
3758 (LA)	The Baby Bandit	© June 11, 1930	Bobby Watson & Anne Cornwall	
3778 (LA)	Niagara Falls	© January 30, 1930	Bryant Washburn & Helen Jerome Eddy	Vitaphone Varieties 1926-30 (Warner Archive) DVD
3798 (LA)	The Pay Off	© March 19, 1930	Harry B. Walthall, Barbara Leonard & Russell Hopton	
3799 (LA)	Vengeance	February 9, 1930 (Film Daily review)	Archie Mayo (director); Warner Richmond, Natalie Moorhead & Gardner James	
3800–3801 (LA, 12 minutes)	Getting a Raise	© February 17, 1930	Bryan Foy (director); Lucien Littlefield, Mary Hutchinson & Billy Taft	The Potters series
3827–3828 (LA, 18 minutes)	At Home	© March 15, 1930	Bryan Foy (director); Lucien Littlefield	The Potters series
3849 (LA)	What a Life	© March 15, 1930	John G. Adolfi (director); William Irving, Lon Poff, Virginia Sale & others	Vitaphone Varieties 1926-30 (Warner Archive) DVD
3863 (LA)	Beatrice Lillie and Her Boyfriends	© May 15, 1930	Beatrice Lillie	
3864 (LA)	Honolulu	January 1930	Noel Madison & Vera Marsh	
3873 (LA)	Who Pays?	© April 30, 1930	John T. Murray & Vivien Oakland	
3881–3882 (LA, 17 minutes)	Done in Oil	© March 15, 1930	Bryan Foy (director); Lucien Littlefield	The Potters series
3883 (LA)	Surprise	© March 15, 1930	Tom Dugan & Barbara Leonard	Vitaphone Varieties 1926-30 (Warner Archive) DVD
3900 (LA)	She Who Gets Slapped	© May 16, 1930	Tom Dugan	Vitaphone Varieties 1926-30 (Warner Archive) DVD
3942–3943 (LA, two-reeler)	Reno or Bust	© April 7, 1930	Howard Bretherton	
3972 (LA)	Paper Hanging	© April 30, 1930	Carter DeHaven & Herman Ruby	
3983–3984 (LA, 18 minutes)	Pa Gets a Vacation	© May 15, 1930	Bryan Foy (director); Lucien Littlefield	The Potters series
3988 (LA)	Ducking Duty	© May 15, 1930	Heinie Conklin & Phil Morgan	
4009–4010 (LA, 14 minutes)	Big Money	May 4, 1930 (Film Daily review)	Bryan Foy (director); Lucien Littlefield	The Potters series
4033 (LA)	The Eternal Triangle	© June 30, 1930	Wyndham Standing, Lillian Rich & Armand Kaliz	
4034 (LA)	Her Relatives	© June 11, 1930	Neely Edwards	
4035 (LA)	Bridal Night	September 14, 1930 (Film Daily review)	Johnny Arthur & Charlotte Merriam	
4036 (LA)	Cry Baby	© June 30, 1930	Bobby Vernon & Mary Treen	
4093 (LA)	No Questions Asked (The Flaming Youth)	© June 11, 1930	Little Billy & Jed Prouty	
4097–4098 (LA, two-reeler)	An Ill Wind or No Mother To Guide Us	May 18, 1930 (Film Daily review)	Edna Hibbard, Theodore Lorch & Eddie Graham	
4099–4100 (LA, 18 minutes)	Out For Game	© June 30, 1930	Bryan Foy (director); Lucien Littlefield, Dot Farley & Del Henderson	The Potters series
4122 (LA)	Road Knights	© June 11, 1930	Roy Mack (director); George Reilly & Eddie Davis	
4123 (LA)	The Body Slam	© June 11, 1930	Eddie Lambert & William Irving	
4139 (LA)	Won to Lose	August 31, 1930 (Film Daily review)	Eddie Lambert & William Irving	
4140 (LA)	The Servant Problem	May 1930	John T. Murray, Vivien Oakland & Mary Strauber	
4149 (LA)	Gates of Happiness	May 1930	Carl McBride (director); Arthur West with Ty Parvis, the Murray Sisters, 20th Century Steppers & Norman Spencer Singers	
4150 (LA)	Russian Around	August 3, 1930 (Film Daily review)	Carl McBride (director); Orville Rennie, Arthur West & others	
4160 (LA)	Ginsburg of Newburg	May 1930	Eddie Lambert & William Irving	
4162–4163 (LA, 22 minutes)	His Big Ambition	© June 30, 1930	Bryan Foy (director); Lucien Littlefield & Lucille Ward	The Potters series
4164 (LA)	I'll Fix It	May 1930	Billy Kent & Alice Lake	
4168 (LA)	Twixt Love and Duty	May 1930	Esther Howard, Eddie Graham & others	
4169 (LA)	Old Seidelburg	May 1930	Carl McBride (director); Orville Rennie, Elsa Peterson, Gus Reed & Janet Gilmore	
4200 (LA)	Dining Out	June 1930	Alice Lake, Billy Kent & Ernest Wood	
4209 (LA)	Railroad Follies	June 1930	Gene Morgan, Clyde Hager & Violet Barlow	
4210 (LA)	School Daze	August 31, 1930 (Film Daily review)	Carl McBride (director); Jack White, Ty Parvis & Jeanie Lang	
4230 (LA)	The Big Deal	June 1930	Harry Holman, Franklin Pangborn, Billy Gilbert, Gertrude Astor & Geneva Mitchell	
4240 (LA)	Who's the Boss	November 2, 1930 (Film Daily review)	Slim Summerville (director); Franklin Pangborn & Esther Howard	
4249 (LA)	The Woman Tamer	June 1930	Billy Gilbert, Esther Howard, Roger Davis, Dot Farley & Gus Reed	
4260 (LA)	The Doctor's Wife	November 30, 1930 (Film Daily review)	Franklin Pangborn, Billy Gilbert, Gertrude Astor & Geneva Mitchell	
4270–4271 (LA, two-reeler)	The Legacy	August 31, 1930 (Film Daily review)	Carl McBride (director); Betty Compton	
4284 (LA)	The Skin Game	July 1930	Jack White, William Irving & Jack Duffy	
4285 (LA)	Ship Ahoy	March 15, 1931 (Film Daily review)	Jack White, Clarence Nordstrom, Esther Howard & Hazel Sperling	
4286 (LA)	The Victim	July 8, 1930	Frank Orth & Esther Howard with Florence Vernon	
4287 (LA)	The Salesman	August 1930	Frank Orth & Florence Vernon	
4393 (LA)	The Happy Hottentots	August 1930	Bryan Foy & Herman Ruby (directors); Joe Frisco & Billy Gilbert	The Jazz Singer DVD
961 (NYC)	Money, Money, Money	© March 15, 1930	Edmund Joseph (director); Homer Mason & Marguerite Keeler	
962 (NYC)	Wedding Belles	© March 15, 1930	Murray Roth (director); Lorraine Howard & Florence Newton	
963-964 (NYC, two-reeler)	Keeping Company	April 6, 1930 (Film Daily review)	Murray Roth (director); Eddie Buzzell	
965 (NYC)	Gym-Jams	© March 15, 1930	Murray Roth (director); Lewis Mayer	
966 (NYC)	Seeing Sarah Off	© March 15, 1930	Murray Roth (director); Sylvia Clark	
967 (NYC)	The Bubble Party	© April 30, 1930	Arthur Hurley (director); Frank Allworth, Janet Velie, Margaret Knight & Don Dilloway	
968 (NYC)	Lobo "The Dog of Dogs" with Clarence Moore	© March 15, 1930	Murray Roth (director)	
969 (NYC)	The Master Sweeper	© March 19, 1930	Arthur Hurley (director); Chester Conklin	
970 (NYC)	Let's Elope!	© March 15, 1930	Edmund Joseph (director); Betty & Jerry Browne	Vitaphone Varieties 1926-30 (Warner Archive) DVD
971 (NYC)	Pat Henning	January 1930		
972 (NYC)	A Battery of Songs	© March 15, 1930	Murray Roth (director); Waite Hoyt & J. Fred Coots	
973 (NYC)	Absent Minded	April 30, 1930	Arthur Hurley (director); Wallace Ford	
974 (NYC)	Giovanni Martinelli in the Prison Scene of "Faust"	April 6, 1930 (Film Daily review)	Giovanni Martinelli	
975-976 (NYC, two-reeler)	The Royal Fourflusher	May 18, 1930	Eddie Buzzell	
977 (NYC)	The Varsity Vamp	© April 30, 1930	Edmund Joseph (director); Lionel "Mike" Ames	
978 (NYC)	Find the Woman	© April 30, 1930	Arthur Hurley & Russel Crouse (director/writers); Hugh O’Connell	
979 (NYC)	Milton C. Work the International Bridge Authority	April 6, 1930 (Film Daily review)	Arthur Hurley (director); Milton C. Work	
980 (NYC)	Three Rounds of Love	© May 15, 1930	Arthur Hurley (director?); Jean Dixon, James Rennie & others	
981 (NYC)	System	© June 9, 1930	Dudley Clements, Evalyn Knapp, Allan Wood & Helen Goodhue	
982 (NYC)	Yuna Baile De Fantancia	© April 30, 1930	Paulo, Paquita & Chiquita	
983 (NYC)	Taking Ways	© April 30, 1930	Murray Roth (director); Frank Orth & Ann Codee	
984 (NYC)	A Russian Rhapsody	© April 30, 1930	Edmund Joseph (director); A. Kuznetzoff & B. Nicolina	
985 (NYC)	Footnotes	© April 30, 1930	Murray Roth (director); Margie Finley, William Carey, Oscar Grogan & the Page Sisters	
986	The No-Account	© April 30, 1930	Edmund Joseph (director); Russell Hardie & Josephine Hutchinson	
987 (NYC)	Nile Green	© May 15, 1930	Murray Roth (director); Helen Broderick & Lester Crawford	
988 (NYC)	At Your Service	© April 30, 1930	Arthur Hurley (director); Jessie Royce Landis, William Halligan, George Blackwood & William Carey	
989 (NYC)	Desert Thrills	© April 30, 1930	Edwin Bartlett & others	
990 (NYC)	The Head Man	© May 15, 1930	Arthur Hurley (director); Hugh O’Connell & Kitty Kelly with Francis Pierlot, Leroy Wade & Arthur Hartley	
991 (NYC)	Rural Hospitality	February 1930	Edmund Joseph (director); Russell Hardie & Marcelle Coreene	
992 (NYC)	The Devil's Parade	© June 8, 1930	George Hale (director); Sidney Toler, Joan Blondell, Gerald Smith & Jessie Busley	
993 (NYC)	The Cheer Leader	© June 9, 1930	Tom Douglas & Beatrice Blinn	
994 (NYC)	Donde Estas Corazon	February 1930	Luana Alcaniz	
995 (NYC)	Taxi Talks (Taxi Tales)	© June 8, 1930	Fred & Fanny Hatton (story); Mayo Method, Katharine Alexander, Roger Pryor, Evelyn Knapp (Evalyn Knapp) & Spencer Tracy	
997 (NYC)	Babe Egan and Her Hollywood Redheads	February 1930	Babe Egan	
998 (NYC)	Websterian Students	© May 15, 1930	Murray Roth (director); Ben Ryan & Henrietta Lee	
999 (NYC)	The Cave Club	© May 15, 1930	Ethel Merman with Marjorie Leach, Frank Tinney & Ted Lewis	
1000 (NYC)	Grand Uproar	© June 8, 1930	Jim McWilliams	
1001 (NYC)	Married	© June 8, 1930	Helen Flint, Stanley Ridges & William Foran	
1002 (NYC)	Office Steps	© May 15, 1930	George Hale (director); Harry McNaughton, the Phelps Twins, Billy Reed, Lou Duthers, Jack Thompson & Gertrude McDonald	
1003 (NYC)	The Strong Arm	March 1930	Paul Harvey	
1004 (NYC)	The Music Racket	© June 30, 1930	Lee Morse, Leo Donnelly & June Clayworth	
1006 (NYC)	The Fight	© June 9, 1930	Ring Lardner (director); Harry McNaughton, Charles Lawrence & others	
1007–1008 (NYC, two-reeler)	The Collegiate Model	© June 9, 1930	Ona Munson, Harry Rosenthal & Roger Pryor	
1009 (NYC)	Yamekraw	June 9, 1930	Murray Roth (director); James Price Johnson (songwriter); Hugo Marianni & His Mediterraneans with Louise Cook, Margaret Sims & Jimmy Mordecai	Warner Bros. Big Band, Jazz & Swing Shorts (Warner Archive) DVD
1010 (NYC)	The Poor Fish	© June 8, 1930	Hobart Cavanaugh, Natalie Schafer, Stanley Ridges & George Blackwood	Vitaphone Varieties Vol. 2 (Warner Archive) DVD
1011 (NYC)	Song Paintings	© June 9, 1930	Ann Seymour	
1012–1013 (NYC, two-reeler)	The Heart Breaker	© June 30, 1930	Edmund Joseph (director); Eddie Foy, Jr., Joan Blondell & others	
1014	The Naggers	June 1, 1930	Mr. & Mrs. Jack Norworth	
1015–1016 (NYC, two-reeler)	Slick As Ever	© June 9, 1930	Harry J. Conley	
1017 (NYC)	23-Skidoo	June 9, 1930	Arthur Hurley (director); Lew Fields	Vitaphone Cavalcade of Musical Comedy Shorts (Warner Archive) DVD
1018 (NYC)	Fore	© June 30, 1930	Wallace Ford, Lenita Lane & Val Sherry	
1019–1020 (NYC, 22 minutes)	The Song Plugger	© June 8, 1930	Roy Mack (director); Joe Frisco with Josephine Williams, Leo Donnelly, Arthur Leonard, Milt Francis & the Wyn Talbert Orchestra	Vitaphone Varieties 1926-30 (Warner Archive) DVD
1021 (NYC)	The Matinee Idle	September 14, 1930 (Film Daily review)	Arthur Hurley (director); Henry Hull & James Dale	
1022 (NYC)	Evolution	© June 11, 1930	Bert Frank (film editor)	compilation documentary includes The Great Train Robbery (1903 film)
1023 (NYC)	The Fowl Triangle	April 1930	Alan Wood, Donna Pasdeloup & others	
1024 (NYC)	Giovanni Martinelli	© January 5, 1931	Roy Mack (director); Giovanni Martinelli	
1025 (NYC)	The Still Alarm	© June 30, 1930	Roy Mack (director); Fred Allen & Clifton Webb	
1026 (NYC)	Thank You, Doctor	May 1930		
1027 (NYC)	Going Places	© June 9, 1930	Shaw & Lee	Vitaphone Varieties Vol. 2 (Warner Archive) DVD
1028 (NYC)	The Duel	June 1930	Lew Fields with Verree Teasdale & Jean De Val	
1029 (NYC)	A Tenement Tangle	June 30, 1930	Murray Roth (director); Ben Ryan & Henrietta Lee	
1030 (NYC)	Strong and Willing	© June 30, 1930	Neville Fleeson (writer); Trixie Friganza	Vitaphone Varieties Vol. 2 (Warner Archive) DVD
1031 (NYC)	Scotch Love	© June 9, 1930	Eric Blore, Nora Swinburne & Ray Collins	
1032 (NYC)	The Varsity Show	© June 30, 1930	Roy Mack (director); Gloria [Olivia] Shea, Joey Ray & Billy Taylor	
1034 (NYC)	Horse Sense	May 1930	Bob Roebuck & his horse Sporting Life	
1035 (NYC)	The Lucky Break	October 12, 1930 (Film Daily review)	Harry Fox, Glenda Farrell & Walter Regan	
1036 (NYC)	The Hard Guy	September 6, 1930	Arthur Hurley (director); Spencer Tracy & Katherine Alexander	Little Caesar (film) (TCM Greatest Gangster Films Prohibition Era) DVD
1037 (NYC)	Temple Bells	May 1930	Eddie Green	
1039–1040 (NYC, two-reeler)	The Play Boy	September 7, 1930 (Film Daily review)	Arthur Hurley (director); Harry Fox & others	
1041–1042 (NYC)	Roseland	September 12, 1930	Roy Mack (director); Ruth Etting	Love Me or Leave Me (film) (Greatest Classic Legends Doris Day) DVD
1043 (NYC)	A Private Engagement	May 1930	the Yacht Club Boys	Vitaphone Varieties Vol. 2 (Warner Archive) DVD
1044 (NYC)	Harmonizing Songs	April 1930	Arthur Hurley (director); Josephine Harmon & Jack King	Vitaphone Varieties Vol. 2 (Warner Archive) DVD
1045 (NYC)	Fashion's Mirror	October 19, 1930 (Film Daily review)	Jack Thompson & Barbara Newberry	Vitaphone Cavalcade of Musical Comedy Shorts (Warner Archive) DVD
1046 (NYC)	Everything Happens to Me	June 1930	Arthur Hurley (director); James Carson with Leo Hoyt, Sid Garry, Lucille Lortel & Lisa Silbert	
1047 (NYC)	At the Round Table	October 5, 1930 (Film Daily review)	Murray Roth (director); James J. Corbett, Damon Runyon, Mark Hellinger & DeWolf Hopper	
1048 (NYC)	Bright Sayings	May 1930	Arthur Hurley (director); Rob Le May, Harry Tighe & Irene Shirley	
1049 (NYC)	Nay, Nay Nero	May 1930	Roy Mack (director); Hugh Cameron, Bobby Watson & Nora Swinburne	
1050 (NYC)	The Wanderer	September 21, 1930	Roy Mack (director); Douglas Stanbury	
1051–1052 (NYC, 14 minutes)	Five Minutes From the Station	October 10, 1930	Arthur Hurley (director); Sylvia Sidney, Lynne Overman & Berton Churchill	
1054	The Substitute	September 28, 1930 (Film Daily review)	Charles Lawrence, Ray Collins & Walter Regan	
1055–1056 (NYC, two-reeler)	Many Happy Returns	August 31, 1930 (Film Daily review)	Arthur Hurley (director); Walter Connolly, Madge Evans, John Breedon & Ferdinand Gottschalk	
1057 (NYC)	Grounds for Murder	July 1930	Harold Beaudine (director); Ernest Glendenning, Phoebe Foster & others	
1059 (NYC)	Let's Merge	June 1930	Roy Mack (director); Doree Leslie, Stanley Ridges & Lillian Fitzgerald	
1060 (NYC)	Snooze Reel #2	June 1930		
1061 (NYC)	The Jay Walker	September 21, 1930 (Film Daily review)	Roy Mack (director); H.I. Phillips (writer); Chester Clute	
1062 (NYC)	Barefoot Days	July 1930	Roy Mack (director); James Dunne?	
1063 (NYC)	The Emergency Case	September 5, 1930	Arthur Hurley (director); Hugh Cameron, Al Ochs & Loretta Shea	
1064 (NYC)	Lost and Found	November 9, 1930 (Film Daily review)	Arthur Hurley (director); William Demarest, Dorothy Appleby & Lilian Bond	
1065 (NYC)	Dolly Daisy in "Dizzy Doings"	August 1930	Howard Moss; co-animator: Charles Bennes	stop-motion animated cartoon
1066 (NYC)	Seeing Off Service	October 19, 1930 (Film Daily review)	Harold Beaudine (director); Joe Penner, Jessie Busley & Harry McNaughton	
1068 (NYC)	Stepping Out	July 1930	Harold Beaudine (director); Joe Penner, Mary Phillips & Leo Donnelly	
1069 (NYC)	Excuse the Pardon	December 7, 1930 (Film Daily review)	Arthur Hurley (director); Ralph Morgan with Marjorie Gateson, Robert Middleton & Katherine Alexander	
1070 (NYC)	Putting It On	June 1930	Bobby Jarvis & Lilian Bond	
1071 (NYC)	Modern Fairy Tales	February 22, 1931 (Film Daily review)	Harold Beaudine (director); Lilian Bond & others	
1072–1073 (NYC, two-reeler)	The Nightingale	February 1, 1931 (Film Daily review)	Roy Mack (director); Vivienne Osborne, Pat O'Brien & Lyle Talbot	
1074 (NYC)	Mister Intruder	November 9, 1930 (Film Daily review)	Arthur Hurley (director); Otto Kruger, Alan Brooks & Veree Teasdale	
1075–1076 (NYC, two-reeler)	His Public	July 1930	Harold Beaudine (director); Joe Morris & Flo Campbell	
1077 (NYC)	Tintypes	July 1930	Roy Mack (director); Chic Yorke & Rose King	
1078 (NYC)	For Two Cents	August 1930	De Wolf Hopper with Stanley Ridges	
1079 (NYC)	The Recruits	February 1, 1931 (Film Daily review)	Arthur Hurley (director); Dudley Clements & Harry Shannon	
1080 (NYC)	A Syncopated Sermon	November 16, 1930 (Film Daily review)	Roy Mack (director); Hall Johnson Choir	
1081 (NYC)	Seeing Things	September 21, 1930 (Film Daily review)	Harold Beaudine (director); William Demarest	
1083 (NYC)	Where There's a Will	September 1930	Roy Mack (director); George Hassell, Mabel Grainger, Joe Bonomo & Martin Berkeley	
1085 (NYC)	For Art's Sake	October 5, 1930	Harold Beaudine (director); Helen Broderick & Lester Crawford	
1086 (NYC)	My Mistake	August 1930	Arthur Hurley (director); Pat O'Brien & Donald Brian	
1087 (NYC)	Alpine Echoes	July 1930	Roy Mack (director); Douglas Stanbury	Spanish version #1088.
1089 (NYC)	Showin' Off	July 1930	Roy Mack (director); the Vitaphone Kiddies	
1090 (NYC)	A Tip to Paris	December 6, 1931 (Film Daily review, completed ’30)	Bobby Jarvis & Eloise Taylor	
1091–1092 (NYC, two-reeler)	The Bard of Broadway	October 5, 1930 (Film Daily review)	Joseph Henabery & Roy Mack (director); Walter Winchell, Madge Evans & others	
1094 (NYC)	Compliments of the Season	September 1930	Arthur Hurley (director); Eric Dressler, Lenita Lane & Pat O'Brien	
1096–1097 (NYC, two-reeler)	Curses	© November 5, 1930	Arthur Hurley (director); Alan Dinehart, Erin O'Brien-Moore & others	
1098–1099 (NYC, two-reeler)	The Gob	© December 9, 1930	Roy Mack (director); Hal Skelly & Madge Evans	
1100 (NYC)	Politics	© November 24, 1930	Arthur Hurley (director); George Jessel	
1102 (NYC)	One on the Aisle	© November 25, 1930	Roy Mack (director); Lon Hascall, Peggy Bernier & George Haggerty	
1103 (NYC)	Knocking 'em Cold	© November 5, 1930	Arthur Hurley (director); Andrew Tombes	
1104 (NYC)	The Thirteenth Prisoner	November 30, 1930	Arthur Hurley (director)	
1105 (NYC)	Tom Thumbs Down	© December 9, 1930	Murray Roth (director); Bobby Jarvis, Jimmy Dunn, Harry McNaughton & Sue Conroy	
1106 (NYC)	Purely an Accident	© November 14, 1930	Reed Brown Jr., Allen Kearns & Frank Otto	
1107 (NYC)	Sitting Pretty	December 28, 1930 (Film Daily review)	Alfred J. Goulding (director); Joe Phillips & Ruth Donnelly	
1108 (NYC)	The Snooze Reel	December 1930	Arthur Hurley & Roy Mack (director)	
1110 (NYC)	A Stuttering Romance	© November 6, 1930	Murray Roth (director); Joe Penner & Dorothea Chard	
1111 (NYC)	The Unfair Sex	© February 16, 1931	Roy Mack (director); Dan Healy & Dolly Gilbert	
1114 (NYC)	The Headache Man	November 23, 1930 (Film Daily review)	Alfred J. Goulding (director); Dudley Clements, Hobart Cavanaugh	
1115 (NYC)	Number Please! (Number, Please)	© October 24, 1930	Roy Mack (director); Sheila Barrett & Leslie Barrie	
1116 (NYC)	My Hero	© November 5, 1930	Alfred J. Goulding (director); Eddie Foy Jr.	
1117 (NYC)	The Honeymoon Trail	© February 5, 1931	Arthur Hurley (director)	
1118 (NYC)	The Pest of Honor	© December 9, 1930	Roy Mack (director); Harry Short, Edward Fielding	
1119 (NYC)	Straight and Narrow	© November 14, 1930	Arthur Hurley (director); Ed Robbins, Herschel Mayall & Allen Jenkins	
1120 (NYC)	Horseshoes	© December 9, 1930	Lynne Overman	
1121 (NYC)	Madame of the Jury	© November 14, 1930	Arthur Hurley (director); Judith Anderson, John Patrick & Phil Leigh	
1122 (NYC)	One Good Turn	© December 9, 1930	Ruth Etting & Jay Velie	
1124 (NYC)	Service Stripes	© December 9, 1930	Alfred J. Goulding (director); Joe Penner, Anthony Hughes & Joan Carter Waddell	
1125 (NYC)	Envy	© January 5, 1931	Arthur Hurley (director); Geoffrey Kerry; Madge Evans, Eric Dresser, Romney Brent	
1126 (NYC)	The Darling Brute	November 1930	Jack Hazzard, Helen Goodhue & William Halligan	
1127 (NYC)	Buster Bear	January 3, 1931 (Earliest Known Date)	John McCory Studio	animated cartoon © April 14, 1930 as "Buster Bear in The Spring Carnival" (an earlier Buster cartoon © March 14, 1930 seems not to have been picked up by Warner). According to the Library of Congress, several titles were originally planned out as a series, including "Buster Bear", "The Life and Adventures of Buster Bear", "Buster Bear in The Opera House", and "Buster Bear in the Spring Carnival". However, all these short segments would be spliced together into a single short to be pitched as potential series for Warner Bros. Pictures. However, Leon Schlesinger rejected the short because both the character and short itself felt outdated by the early 1930's, and was aware of the hostile work environment that McCrory had at his studio, with Harman and Ising's short Bosko, the Talk-Ink Kid winning the contract, which would become Looney Tunes.
1128 (NYC)	Henry Santry and His Soldiers of Fortune	March 1, 1931 (Film Daily review)	Roy Mack (director); Henry Santry	Vitaphone Cavalcade of Musical Comedy Shorts (Warner Archive) DVD
1130 (NYC)	Wedding Bills	© January 5, 1931	Alfred J. Goulding (director); Billy Wayne, Helen Lynd & Brooks Benedict	
1131 (NYC)	The Check-up	© December 10, 1930	Jack Hazzard & Ruth Donnelly	
1132–1133 (NYC, two-reeler)	Revenge Is Sweet	December 1930	Alfred J. Goulding (director); Herschel Mayall, Barbara Weeks, Leslie Adams & Frank Allworth	
1134 (NYC)	Lodge Night	© December 10, 1930	Joe Phillips, John Dunsmore & Hazel Cox	
1135 (NYC)	Home Made	© December 10, 1930	Arthur Hurley (director); Albert Hackett, Dorothy Hall & Jessie Busley	
1136 (NYC)	Dolly Daisy in "Hearts and Flowers"	December 1930	Howard Moss; co-animator: Charles Bennes	stop-motion animated cartoon
1137 (NYC)	The Painter	© January 5, 1931	Alfred J. Goulding (director); Frank Orth	
1138 (NYC)	Opening Night	© January 5, 1931	Roy Mack (director) & Benjamin Kaye (writer); Dorothy Sands, Thomas Jackson, Leo Hoyt, Peggy Shannon, Helen Eby-Rock	Vitaphone Cavalcade of Musical Comedy Shorts (Warner Archive) DVD
1140 (NYC)	The Lady Killer	© January 5, 1931	Arthur Hurley (director); Eric Dressler & Shirley Palmer	
1141 (NYC)	Last But Not Leased	© January 5, 1931	Alfred J. Goulding (director); Billy Wayne & Thelma White	
1142 (NYC)	Last Straw	© January 5, 1931	Roy Mack (director); Romney Bent	
1143 (NYC)	Charlie Hackett in "Romeo & Juliet"	November 9, 1930 (Film Daily review)	Charles Hackett with Rosa Lowe	
1144 (NYC)	Maid to Order	© January 5, 1931	Eleanor Shaler, Pauline MacLean & Bob Lynn	
1145 (NYC)	The Watch Dog	© January 5, 1931	Alfred J. Goulding (director); Jack Hazzard	
1147 (NYC)	Office Scandal	© December 9, 1930	Edgar Bergen, Charlie McCarthy & Christina Graver	Vitaphone Varieties Vol. 2 (Warner Archive) DVD
1149 (NYC)	Merry Christmas (Pap's Slay Ride)	© March 16, 1931	Hugh Cameron & Spring Byington	
1150 (NYC)	On the Job	© January 5, 1931	Roy Mack (director); Ann Codee, Frank Orth, Florence Vernon	
1151 (NYC)	Africa Shrieks	© February 5, 1931	Roy Mack (director); Hugh Cameron	
1152 (NYC)	Peace and Quiet	© February 5, 1931	Arthur Hurley (director); Billy Wayne & Betty Lawrence	
1153 (NYC)	One Way Out	© January 5, 1931	Arthur Hurley (director); Charles Lawrence & Thelma White	Vitaphone Cavalcade of Musical Comedy Shorts (Warner Archive) DVD
1155–1156 (NYC, two reeler)	With Pleasure	© February 5, 1931	Roy Mack (director); Billy Wayne, the Colette Sisters & others	
1157 (NYC)	The Love Nest	© February 5, 1931	Alfred J. Goulding (director); Billy Wayne & Thelma White	
1158 (NYC)	Squaring the Triangle	© February 5, 1931	Donald Brian & Mayo Methot	
1159 (NYC)	The Old Flame	© February 5, 1931	Audrey Dale, Dennie Moore & John Marsdon	
1160 (NYC)	The Hangover	© February 5, 1931	Roy Mack (director); Bernard Granville & Neely Edwards	
1161 (NYC)	The Strange Case	© February 5, 1931	Roy Mack (director); Charles Halton & Gerald Oliver Smith	
1167–1168 (NYC, two-reeler)	Masquerade	© February 16, 1931	Casey Robinson (director); Vivienne Osborne, Roy D'Arcy & Wilfred Lytell	
1171 (NYC)	Good Times	© February 16, 1931	Arthur Hurley (director); Madge Evans	
1188 (NYC)	Playing with Fire	© March 26, 1931	Roy Mack (director); Jack Hazzard	
4426–4427 (LA, two-reeler)	The Border Patrol	January 25, 1931 (Film Daily review)	Joe Frisco, Dorothy Knapp, Eddie Graham & Theodore Lorch	
4654 (LA)	Alaska	© February 16, 1931	Eddie Lambert	Laff Tours

=== 1931 ===
Filmed in 1931 in Brooklyn, New York.

#	Title	Release, copyright or review date	Director & performers	Notes
1149	Crimes Square	© March 26, 1931	Arthur Hurley (director); Pat O'Brien, Mary Doran	Vitaphone Varieties Vol. 2 (Warner Archive) DVD
1162	Ship's Concert	February 5, 1931	Giovanni Martinelli	
1163	Making Good	© February 5, 1931	Alfred J. Goulding (director); Stanley Rauh (story); Joe Penner	
1164	Taking Chances	April 26, 1931 (Film Daily review)	Alfred J. Goulding (director); Billy Wayne & Thelma White	
1165	Court Plastered	January 25, 1931 (Film Daily review)	Helen Broderick & Lester Crawford	
1166	Sleepy Head	© February 5, 1931	Alfred J. Goulding (director); Billy Wayne & Thelma White	
1169	Second Childhood	© February 5, 1931	Roy Mack (director); Herschel Mayall & Clara Mackin	
1173	Hello, Sucker!	© February 20, 1931	Arthur Hurley (director); Hugh O’Connell	
1174	Carnival	April 12, 1931 (Film Daily review)	Giovanni Martinelli & John Harvard	
1175	Hot Sands	© February 20, 1931	Alfred J. Goulding (director); Billy Wayne & Thelma White	
1176	George Jessel and His Russian Art Choir	© February 20, 1931	George Jessel	Smart Money (1931 film) (TCM Greatest Gangster Films Prohibition Era) DVD
1177	Donkey Business	© February 5, 1931	Alfred J. Goulding (director); Edgar Bergen, Charlie McCarthy & Christina Graver	
1178	Stars of Yesterday	February 22, 1931 (Film Daily review)	Bert Frank (film editor)	Reissued as a "Pepper Pot". Clips of various silent screen stars: William S. Hart, Texas Guinan, Theda Bara & Mabel Normand. Walter O'Keefe hosts.
1179–1180 (two-reeler)	Angel Cake	© February 20, 1931	Roy Mack (director)	
1183–1184 (two-reeler)	Partners	March 15, 1931 (Film Daily review)	Leon Errol, Billy Gaxton, George Haggerty & Shirley Palmer	
1185	Sax Appeal	© April 13, 1931	Alfred J. Goulding (director); Joe Penner	
1186	Good Pie Forever	© April 13, 1931	Roy Mack (director); Billy Wayne & Thelma White	
1187	The Spirits of 76th Street	March 26, 1931	Arthur Hurley (director); Helen Broderick, Dudley Clements & Lester Crawford	
1190	Dumb Luck	April 19, 1931 (Film Daily review)	Alfred J. Goulding (director); Frank Orth & Ann Codee	
1191	Close Friends	June 1931	Alfred J. Goulding (director); Hobart Cavanaugh & Roger Gray	
1193	Night Club Revels	© March 16, 1931	Roy Mack (director); Walter O’Keefe with the Collette Sisters & the Muriel Abbott Dancers	
1194	Ye Old Time News Reel (Yee Old Time News Flashes)	April 26, 1931 (Film Daily review)	Bert Frank (editor); narr: Burnet Hershey	compilation reel with old clips of the Wright brothers & Harry Houdini
1195	Hocus Pocus	© March 16, 1931	Edgar Bergen (& Charlie McCarthy)	
1196	Hitting the High C's	© March 16, 1931	Roy Mack (director); the Brittons (Frank & Mitt Britton)	
1198–1199 (two-reeler)	Gangway	August 16, 1931 (Film Daily review)	Alfred J. Goulding (director); Joe Penner & Polly Walters	
1200	Sky High	March 29, 1931 (Film Daily review)	Roy Mack (director); Janet Reade & Dudley Clements with Larry Adler & the Lovel Sisters	
1201	Riding Master	March 1931	Poodles Hanneford with Madge Evans & Naomi Ray	
1203	The Grand Dame	May 2, 1931	Arthur Hurley (director); Patsy Kelly	Vitaphone Cavalcade of Musical Comedy Shorts (Warner Archive) DVD
1204–1205 (two-reeler)	Freshman Love	April 12, 1931 (Film Daily review)	Roy Mack (director); Ruth Etting with Don Tompkins & Jeanie Lang	
1206	Good Mourning	August 23, 1931 (Film Daily review)	Alfred J. Goulding (director); Eddie Foy, Jr. with Eric Dressler, Thelma White, Peggy Shannon, Doris Covert & Mel Efird	
1209–1210 (two-reeler)	The Handy Guy	May 24, 1931 (Film Daily review)	Roy Mack (director); Earle Sande	
1212	The Inventor	May 11, 1931 (Film Daily review)	Al Ray (director); Billy Wayne & Thelma White	
1213	Come Back to Sorriento	February 1931	Giovanni Martinelli, The Albertieri Dancers	
1215	Cold Turkey	July 5, 1931	Roy Mack (director); Helen Broderick & Lester Crawford	
1216	Babykins	July 19, 1931 (Film Daily review)	Al Ray (director?); Pee Wee Singer	
1217	The Dandy and the Belle	May 11, 1931 (Film Daily review)	Roy Mack (director); Frank McGlynn, Mary Murray, Pauline Dee	
1220	Nine O'Clock Folks	June 28, 1931 (Film Daily review)	Roy Fant & the Mound City Blue Blowers	Vitaphone Cavalcade of Musical Comedy Shorts (Warner Archive) DVD
1221–1222 (two-reeler)	Moving In	June 7, 1931 (Film Daily review)	Al Ray (director); Joe Penner	
1224	Fast and Pleasant	May 1931	Al Ray (director); Billy Wayne & Thelma White	
1226	The Troubador	May 11, 1931 (Film Daily review)	Roy Mack (director); Giovanni Martinelli	
1227	Baby Face	May 1931	Victor Moore	
1232	Milky Way	May 1931	Roy Mack (director); Neely Edwards with Six Ambassadors, Bob Ripa & the Muriel Abbott Dancers	
1235	The Week End	June 1931	Neely Edwards, Mary Murray & Lucille Sears	
1241	The Bitter Wife (Our Wife)	June 1931	Al Ray (director); Frank Orth & Ann Codee with Dudley Clements, Florence Vernon, Lew Christy & Mabel Ash	
1244	Opportunity Night	June 1931	Al Klein, Frank Leslie & Genevieve Bowman	
1245	The Gypsy Caravan	September 27, 1931	Roy Mack (director); Giovanni Martinelli, Max Pollikoff (violinist) & Willis Stiles (dancer)	
1246–1247 (two-reeler)	June 28, 1931 (Film Daily review)	The Bigger They Are	Primo Carnera & Little Billy	
1255–1256 (two-reeler)	The Gigolo Racket	June 21, 1931 (Film Daily review)	Roy Mack (director); Helen Morgan with Reed Brown Jr. & Joseph Striker	Vitaphone Varieties Vol. 2 (Warner Archive) DVD
1257–1258 (two-reeler)	Success	July 1931	Alfred J Goulding (director); Jack Haley, Helen Lynd & Phil Silvers	Vitaphone Varieties Vol. 2 (Warner Archive) DVD
1260	Travel Hogs	November 15, 1931 (Film Daily review)	Hugh Cameron & Dave Chasen	
1263	Gold Digging Gentlemen	August 23, 1931 (Film Daily review)	Roy Mack (director); Al Klein, Maria Gambarelli, Joan Abbott, Harriet Nawrot & Co.	
1279	A Havana Cocktail	1931	Roy Mack (director); The Castro Cuban Orchestra	
1314	The High School Hoofer	December 6 (Film Daily review)	Roy Mack (director); Hal Le Roy & Eleanor King	
1564–1565	Seasons Greetings	December 20, 1931	Arthur Hurley (director); Janet Reade, Ray Collins, Joe Penner, Robert L. Ripley, Jack Norworth, Thelma White, Ruth Etting	

=== 1932 ===
#	Title	Release, copyright or review date	Director & performers	Additional notes
1351	Campus Spirit	April 24, 1932 (Film Daily review)	Roy Mack (director); Douglas Stanbury & NYU Glee Club	
1387	Smash Your Baggage	October 29, 1932	Roy Mack (director); Carrie Marrier, Lew Payton, Mabel Scott	Warner Bros. Big Band, Jazz & Swing Shorts (Warner Archive) DVD
1391	Pie, Pie Blackbird	June 4, 1932	Roy Mack (director) & A. Dorian Otvas (directors); Eubie Blake, Nina Mae McKinney & the Nicholas Brothers	Warner Bros. Big Band, Jazz & Swing Shorts (Warner Archive) DVD & Hallelujah! (1929 film) DVD
1454	Municipal Band Wagon	© September 29, 1932	Roy Mack (director); Bernice Claire with Jimmy Caruso Band, Cy Laundry and Walter Wilson	
5401	Breakwater	August 1932		

== Vitaphone Varieties in Technicolor (1929–1930) ==
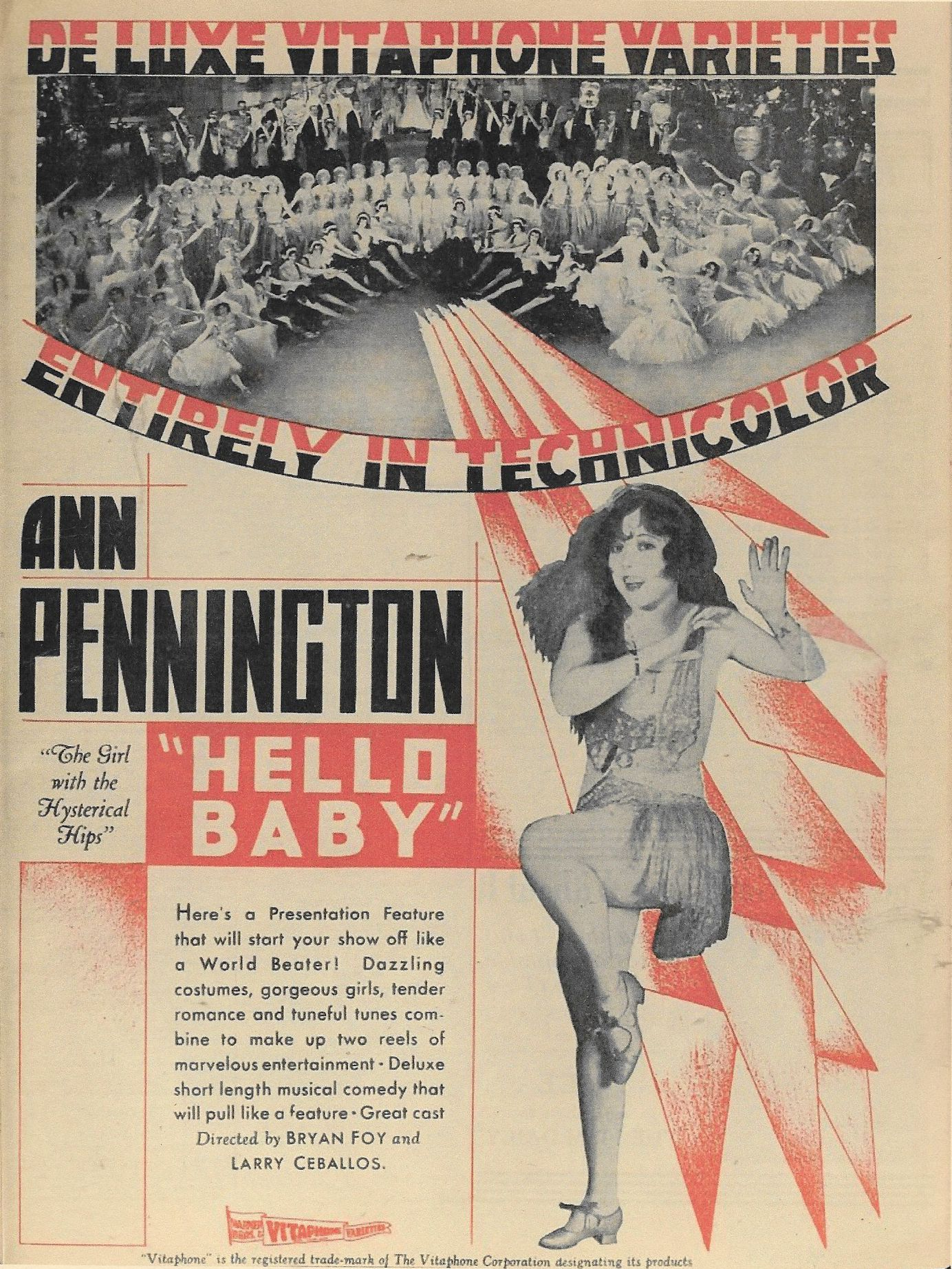
The poster for the technicolor Vitaphone short "Hello, Baby!"

Warners Brothers and its Vitaphone and First National subsidiaries produced more features and shorts in two-strip Technicolor during the late twenties and early thirties than any other studio. Unfortunately not all of them survive in their original format as black and white TV prints are sometimes the remaining available ones. The following were filmed in Hollywood in the fall of 1929 through the spring of 1930. One title, Bubbles, is available in black and white form on Meet Me In St. Louis (2-disc) DVD & Vitaphone Cavalcade of Musical Comedy Shorts (Warner Archive) DVD

Title	Release, copyright or review date	Director & performers
The Military Post	October 1929	Roberto Guzman (director)
A Spanish Fiesta	October 1929	Roberto Guzman (director)
Dance of The Paper Dolls	November 13, 1929	Roy Mack (director)
Minstrel Days	© January 13, 1930	The Plantation Four & Jess Brooke
Bubbles	January 1930	Roy Mack (director); The Gumm Sisters with Judy Garland, Mary McCarty & The Vitaphone Kiddies
The Sultan's Jester	January 1930	Joyzell, Randall Adagio Four & Edward Lankow
Only the Girl	February 1930	Vera Marshe & Buddy Wattles
A Scene from Carmen	February 19, 1930 (filmed October 1929)	Alice Gentle. May be a cut scene from The Show of Shows
Lonely Gigolo	March 1930	Jack Haskell (director); Lotti Loder
Jazz Rehearsal	© March 19, 1930 (filmed December '29)	
And How	© March 19, 1930 (filmed December '29)	Anne Greenway
Contrary Mary	© March 19, 1930 (filmed Dec '29)	Bobby Watson
The Wedding of Jack and Jill	© March 19, 1930	Roy Mack (director); The Gumm Sisters with Judy Garland, Peggy Ryan & The Vitaphone Kiddies
Hello Baby!	© March 24, 1930 (filmed December '29)	Larry Ceballos, Ann Pennington, and James Clemens, has a cut song from The Show of Shows
A Holiday in Storyland	April 2, 1930	Roy Mack (director); The Gumm Sisters with Judy Garland, the Vitaphone Kiddies, the Three Kute & Five Little Steppers
South Sea Pearl	May 7, 1930	Gaston Glass
Holland	May 28, 1930	Jack Haskell (director)
The Japanese Bowl	June 11, 1930	Jack Haskell (director)
Evolution of the Dance	July 11, 1930 (Film Daily review)	Lupino Lane, Billy Taft & Mary Hutchinson
Girls We Remember	© September 6, 1930	Mack College Quartette, the DeMarcos & Mitzi Mayfair
College Capers	© September 6, 1930	Carl McBride (director); Ty Parvis, Lillian Crowell, Baron & Janet Gilmore, Ken & DeBard Brothers
Modern Business	© September 6, 1930	
Poor Little Butterfly	September 21, 1930	Roy Mack (director)
Shakespeare Was Right	October 12, 1930 (Film Daily review; completed February)	

== Assorted Vitaphone promotionals and commercials ==
Not a complete list, but a select number of 1926–1931 shorts of interest

- The Birth of the Telephone / Thomas A. Watson (former assistant to Alexander Graham Bell) / June 1926
- Reverend J. Ford and Reverend H. Hickman: 100th anniversary of Jamestown, New York / June 1927
- Special Star Number for Theater Opening / Al Jolson / December 1928
- Voice of Vitaphone / August 1929 / Short reel numbered #877
- Intimate Dinner in Celebration of Warner Bros. Silver Jubilee / John G. Adolfi (director) / August 1930 / The Jazz Singer DVD
- Chesterfield Celebrities / Clark & McCullough / January 18, 1931 / 22 minute special
- Graduation Day in Bugland / animated cartoon / March 1, 1931
- Slopes of the Andes / March 29, 1931 / commercial for American Coffee

== Pepper Pots (1931–1936) ==
"Pepper Pots" replaced "Vitaphone Varieties" as a marketing name for Warner's black & white one-reel (running under 11 minutes) shorts released between 1931 and 1936. These included comedy acts, a series spotlighting famous songwriters and a number of sports, animal subjects and other human-interest documentary films.

Title	Director & performers	Release, copyright or review date	Additional notes
Speaking Out Of Turn	Al Ray (director); Johnny Walker & Dudley Clements	September 20, 1931 (Film Daily review)	
The Eyes Have It	Alfred J. Goulding (director); Edgar Bergen, Charlie McCarthy & Christina Graver	© October 3, 1931	The Public Enemy (Greatest Gangster Films Prohibition Era) DVD
Thrills Of Yesterday: Serious Moments from Serial Days	Bert Frank (film editor)	October 17, 1931	Vitaphone Cavalcade of Musical Comedy Shorts (Warner Archive) DVD (film montage featuring Norma Talmidge, William Duncan, The Perils of Pauline (1914 serial), Harry Houdini & Larry Semon)
Free And Easy	Roy Mack (director); Edgar Bergen, Charlie McCarthy & Christina Graver	November 8, 1931 (Film Daily review)	
In Your Sombrero	Billy Wayne & Josephine Bono	November 15, 1931 (Film Daily review)	
Hot News Margie	Alfred J. Goulding (director); Marjorie Beebe	November 29, 1931 (Film Daily review)	Vitaphone Cavalcade of Musical Comedy Shorts (Warner Archive) DVD
Relativity And Relatives	Dr. Rockwell	December 6, 1931 (Film Daily review)	Motion Picture Herald also lists this as a "Big Star Comedy"
The Wise Quacker	The Drakes	December 1931	
Junior	Roy Mack (director); Neely Edwards with James McCallion, Maxine Flood & May Hanna	January 10, 1932 (Film Daily review; completed May 1931)	
Cigars, Cigarettes	Alfred J. Goulding (director); Marjorie Beebe	February 28, 1932 (Film Daily review)	
Stuck Down Stucco	Alfred J. Goulding (director); Louis Simon, Gertrude Mudge & others	March 1932	
The Movie Album #1	Herman Ruby (director); Bert Frank (film editor)	March 5, 1932	Vitaphone Cavalcade of Musical Comedy Shorts (Warner Archive) DVD (film montage includes Biograph 1913 material with Lionel Barrymore, Blanche Sweet and Lillian Gish, Mr. & Mrs. Sidney Drew at Vitagraph, MY OFFICIAL WIFE with Clara Kimball Young, early Norma Shearer in 1922, John Bunny, Helene Costello, Maurice Costello, Florence Turner, 1915 feature CARMEN, Charlie Chaplin in A WOMAN, Antonio Morenao & Edith Storey)
Remember When	Bert Frank (film editor)	April 17, 1932 (Film Daily review)	clips of Teddy Roosevelt, Titanic, Emmeline Pankhurst and Nicholas II of Russia
Movie Album #2 (Movie Album Featurettes)	Bert Frank (film editor)	June 4, 1932	Vitaphone Cavalcade of Musical Comedy Shorts (Warner Archive) DVD (film montage mostly from the Vitagraph and Biograph studios featuring Maurice Costello, John Bunny, Helene Costello, Blanche Sweet, Walter Miller (actor) & James Young in 1914's THE PORTRAIT)
Movie Album #3	Bert Frank (film editor)	June 1932	Includes early shots of Marie Dressler
Napoleon's Bust	Alfred J. Goulding (director); Don Coleman, Jane Allen & Ted Husing	June 18, 1932 (Film Daily review)	
Love Thy Neighbor	Alfred J. Goulding (director); Dan Tompkins & Marel Foster	July 23, 1932 (Film Daily review)	
Babe O'Mine		Jul 23, 1932 (Film Daily review)	
If I'm Elected	Alfred J. Goulding (director); Douglass Dumbrille, Ray Collins, Chester Clute & Diana Seaby	August 9, 1932 (Film Daily review)	
Nickelette	Roy Mack (director)	August 24, 1932 (Film Daily review)	Vitaphone Cavalcade of Musical Comedy Shorts (Warner Archive) DVD (film montage of 1890s NYC Bowery, sports events 1910s, Rudolph Valentino in 1920 and vintage Vitagraph)
You're Killing Me	Alfred J. Goulding (director); Ray Collins, Victor Kilian & others	August 26, 1932 (Film Daily review)	
King Salmon		© September 29, 1932	
Contact	Joseph Henabery (director); Frank Hawks, Alice Reinheart, Billy Hayes, G. MacQuarrie, Scott Moore & William Pringle	October 8, 1932	
Mississippi Suite, A Tone Journey		October 1932	musical travelogue
Out of the Past	Bert Frank (film editor)	October 22, 1932 (Film Daily review)	clips of Douglas Fairbanks, Charlie Chaplin and Jack Dempsey
Fisherman's Holiday	Frank McHugh (narrator)	November 1932	Tuna fishing
Dangerous Occupations	Bert Frank (film editor); Lowell Thomas	© January 16, 1933	newsreel clips of daredevilry
A Whale of a Yarn	Lowell Thomas (narrator)	January 28, 1933 (Film Daily review)	Alaska wildlife (whales, sea otters, birdlife)
Africa Speaks - English	Roy Mack (director), Edgar Bergen (& Charlie McCarthy)	© February 6, 1933	
Sea Devils	Frank McHugh (narrator)	© March 22, 1933	tuna fishing
Little White Lies	Glen Lambert (director); Franklin Ardell & Chester Clute, Dan Coleman, Margaret Lee, Wilfred Lyrel and Agnes Franey	April 1, 1933	
Inklings	Charles Geigerich; Lowell Thomas (narrator); part animated cartoon	April 8, 1933	Vitaphone Cavalcade of Musical Comedy Shorts (Warner Archive) DVD
Parades of Yesterday	Jack Henley; Bert Frank (film editor); Leo Donnelly (narrator); David Mendoza (music)	April 8, 1933	newsreel footage of 1890s-20s of Coney Island, civil war veterans and the 1919 victory celebration.
Around the World in Eight Minutes	Alfred J. Goulding (director); Hugh Cameron, Dan Coleman, Dudley Hawley & Lois Wild	© June 6, 1933	(filmed February 1932)
A Penny a Peep	Ralph Staub (director); Fred Harper, Gertrude Mudge & Dick Wallace	© July 16, 1933	Vitaphone Cavalcade of Musical Comedy Shorts (Warner Archive) DVD
Song Hits by Roy Turk	Roy Mack (director); Kay Hamilton, Madelyn Kileen, Mario & Lavarin, Barnett & Clark & Mildren van Dorn	July 1933	
The Road Is Open Again	Alfred E. Green (director); Dick Powell	August 1933	
Walter Donaldson, Popular Composer	Roy Mack (director)	© September 9, 1933	
Rock-A-Bye Bye	Joseph Henabery (director); Doctor Rockwell, Jules Epailly, Adelina Thomason & Oscar Ragland	© September 28, 1933	
Admission Five Cents	Leo Donnelly (narrator)	© October 9, 1933	
Laughs in the Law	Joseph Henabery (director); Dan Coleman, Joan Castle, Robert Hyman, Hugh Cameron & Edgar Nelson	© October 20, 1933	
Harry Warren: America's Foremost Composer	Ray McCarey (director); Harry Warren	November 18, 1933	42nd Street (film) DVD & Vitaphone Cavalcade of Musical Comedy Shorts (Warner Archive) DVD
Movie Memories	Jack Henley & Glen Lambert (directors)	December 30, 1933	Vitaphone Cavalcade of Musical Comedy Shorts (Warner Archive) DVD (includes clips of Robert Anderson Van Wyck, 1910 Jeffries-Johnson fight & Flora Finch and Kate Brice in THE OLD FIRE HORSE AND THE NEW FIRE CHIEF, 1914)
Isn't That Awful?	Roy Mack (director); Easy Aces (Goodman & Jane Ace)	© February 28, 1934	
The Wrong, Wrong Trail	Joseph Henabery (director); Block and Sully (Jesse Block & Eve Sully), Donald McBride & Shemp Howard	© February 28, 1934	Vitaphone Comedy Collection Vol. 1 (Warner Archive) DVD
The Tune Detective	Joseph Henabery (director); Sigmund Spaeth, Katherine Newman, Peggy Lee, Vera Van & Davey Jones	© March 1, 1934	
Easy Aces	Joseph Henabery (director); Easy Aces (Goodman & Jane Ace)	© March 4, 1934	first Easy Aces comedy filmed (July 1933)
Hollywood Newsreel	George Bilson	March 24, 1934	42nd Street (film) DVD & Vitaphone Cavalcade of Musical Comedy Shorts (Warner Archive) DVD (features Guy Kibbee, Dick Powell, Joan Blondell & Hal Le Roy)
Little Miss Mischief		© April 10, 1934	
A Cabinet Meeting	Joseph Henabery (director); Radio Ramblers, Janet Rathbun and Dudley Clements	© April 13, 1934	
Pure Feud	Joseph Henabery (director); Edgar Bergen (& Charlie McCarthy) (and Shemp Howard in a bit role)	© Apr 14, 1934	Vitaphone Comedy Collection Vol. 1 (Warner Archive) DVD
Those Were the Days	Roy Mack (director), George Meyer, Brook Allen, the Eton Boys, Lovey Sisters and Helen Gordon	© April 23, 1934	
Good Badmitten	Hugh Herbert, Walter Pidgeon	June 1934	
At the Races	Joseph Henabery & Jack Henley (directors); Edgar Bergen (& Charlie McCarthy)	July 21, 1934	
Just Concentrate	Ralph Staub (director); Lulu McConnell, Bob Hyman, Eddie Acuff & Jean Lacy	© July 21, 1934	
Dad Minds The Baby		August 3, 1934	
The Camera Speaks	Billy Bitzer	August 11, 1934	Lady Killer (1933 film) DVD & Vitaphone Cavalcade of Musical Comedy Shorts (Warner Archive) DVD (includes clips of Gloria Swanson, Bobby Vernon, Charles Ray, Dorothy Dalton, Louise Glaum & William Jennings Bryan)
Guess Stars	Joseph Henabery (director); Radio Ramblers, Lionel Stander & Nancy Kelly	August 22, 1934	
Movie Memories #2	Ralph Staub (director)	August 23, 1934 (Film Daily review)	Vitaphone Cavalcade of Musical Comedy Shorts (Warner Archive) DVD (montage of famous stars who died before 1934)
The Stolen Melody	Joseph Henabery (director); Sigmund Spaeth, Noveliers Quartet, Crawford & Caskey, Kean & Reese	© October 5, 1934	
Vaudeville Reel #1: Herb Williams	Joseph Henabery (director); with Honey Family, Reis & Dunn, Grauman's Stepping Stars	October 13, 1934	Footlight Parade DVD & Vitaphone Cavalcade of Musical Comedy Shorts (Warner Archive) DVD
Vaudeville Reel #2: Buster Shaver, Olive and George	Roy Mack (director); Jack Pepper's Society Pets, Carl Emmy & his Mad Wigs, the Three Queens	October 29, 1934	Vitaphone Cavalcade of Musical Comedy Shorts (Warner Archive) DVD
Songs That Live	Roy Mack (director); Gus Edwards	© November 24, 1934	
A Trip through a Hollywood Studio	Ralph Staub (director); Hugh Herbert & others	December 7, 1934	42nd Street (film) (Greatest Classic Films Busby Berkeley 1) DVD & Vitaphone Cavalcade of Musical Comedy Shorts (Warner Archive) DVD
Charles Ahearn and His Millionaires	Joseph Henabery (director); with Eddie Miller & the Three Aristocrats	© February 9, 1935	
Vaudeville Reel #3: Al Trahan	Joseph Henabery (director); Chaz Chase, Ray & Sunshine, the Holman Sisters	February 16, 1935	Vitaphone Cavalcade of Musical Comedy Shorts (Warner Archive) DVD
Radio Reel #1: Listening In	Roy Mack (director); Arthur Brown, DeMarco Sisters, Cross & Dunn, Irene Taylor and Mary Small	© February 18, 1935	
Radio Reel #3: We Do Our Part	Joseph Henabery (director); Landt Trio & White, Donald Novis, Ed Lowry, Edith Murray, Gene & Glenn and David Burns	© February 18, 1935	
Man of a Thousand Hits	Joseph Henabery (director); Harry Von Tilzer	© March 18, 1935	
Radio Reel #4: Egg Marks The Spot	Joseph Henabery (director); Sam Hearn, Jessie Busley, Three X Sisters, Lee Sullivan, Sims & Bailey	March 30, 1935	
Billy Hill	Joseph Henabery (director); Billy Hill (songwriter)	© April 8, 1935	
Some Bridge Work	Lloyd French (director); Easy Aces (Goodman & Jane Ace)	April 13, 1935	
Vaudeville Reel #4: All Star Vaudeville	Roy Mack (director); On-Wah Troupe, Blossom Seeley, Benny Fields, Pat Rooney Jr. & Sr., the Runaway Four	April 27, 1935	Vitaphone Cavalcade of Musical Comedy Shorts (Warner Archive) DVD
Palm Beach Knights	Lloyd French (director); Charles Ahearn, David Burns, Casper Balsamo and Fred Harper	May 1935	
Two Boobs in a Balloon	Lloyd French (director); Edgar Bergen (& Charlie McCarthy)	May 5, 1935	
Kings of the Turf	Ralph Staub (director)	May 11, 1935	horse-race reel
Moving Melodies	Joseph Henabery (director); J. Fred Coots, Lillian Shade & Charles Coles	June 8, 1935	
All Colored Vaudeville Show	Roy Mack (director); Adelaide Hall, Nicholas Brothers	June 22, 1935	Warner Bros. Big Band, Jazz & Swing Shorts (Warner Archive) DVD & The Green Pastures (film) DVD
Radio Reel #5- Rah Rah Radio	Roy Mack (director); David Burns, Jimmie Lucas, DeMarco Sisters, Ralph Kirbery, Al & Lee Riser and Jack & Lee Cleman	July 6, 1935	
What's the Idea?	Roy Mack (director); Lew Pollack, Helen Ware & the Cavaliers	August 17, 1935	
Nutville	Roy Mack (director); Radio Ramblers, Donald MacBride & David Burns	September 7, 1935	
The All American Drawback	Lloyd French (director); Edgar Bergen (& Charlie McCarthy)	October 5, 1935	Captain Blood (1935 film) (Greatest Classic Legends Errol Flynn) DVD
Wee Men	Joseph Henabery (director); Singer's Midgets, Lucille Sears & Flora Seaman	November 2, 1935	
P's and Cues (Ps & Qs)	Lloyd French (director); Paul Douglas (narrator); Charles Peterson & Ruth McGinnis	November 27, 1935	
Can It Be Done?	Lloyd French (director); Ray Gross, Charles Laurance, Loretta Sayers & Elliot Fisher	November 29, 1935	
Some Class	Lloyd French (director); Charles Ahearn, Willie Solar & Gene Bruce	December 4, 1935	
Logging Along	Eddie Acuff (narrator)	December 4, 1935	
Wild Wings	Donald R. Dickey (director); Gayne Whitman (narrator)	January 24, 1936	covers birdlife at Laysan Island
Seein' Stars	Lloyd French (director); Easy Aces (Goodman & Jane Ace) with Clarence Chase & Billie Leonard	February 8, 1936	(filmed September 1934)
Timber Giants (Tall Timber)	Eddie Acuff (narrator)	February 22, 1936	logging documentary
Half-Witness	Roy Mack (director); Radio Ramblers	March 21, 1936	
Whale Ho!		April 1936	profiles whale hunting in New Zealand
Beneath the Sea	B. F. Zeidman (producer); Stacy Woodard (director)	April 11, 1936	Undersea documentary featuring sharks and octopus
Medium Well Done	Lloyd French (director); Theodore Hardeen	© April 21, 1936	

== Vitaphone "Novelties" and revived Vitaphone Varieties (1936–1939) ==
All of these are black and white shorts, running under 11 minutes and completed at the Brooklyn (NYC) facilities.

Title	Director & performers	Release, copyright or review date	Additional notes
Nut Guilty	Lloyd French (director); Edgar Bergen (& Charlie McCarthy), Gerrie Worthing, George Anderson & Edith Brandall	June 12, 1936	
When Fish Fight	(Sunbeam Pictures co-production); Clem McCarthy (narrator)	July 11, 1936	
Check Your Cash	Lloyd French (director); Paul Douglas (narrator); card expert Louis Zingone	© July 12, 1936	
Slum Fun	Lloyd French (director); Johnny Berkes & Charles O'Donnell	© August 8, 1936	
An Ounce of Prevention	Lloyd French (director); Ray Gross	October 21, 1936	
Oklahoma As Is	Carl Sterns Clancy & Cal Tinney	October 29, 1936 (Film Daily review)	travelogue
Roger Wolf Kahn & His Orchestra	Roy Mack (director); Roger Wolf Kahn, Charles Carlyle, Evelyn Poe, James & Evelyn Vernon	December 2, 1936	
Rushin' Art	John Henley & Lloyd French (directors); Miss Juliet & others	December 1936	
Ghost to Ghost Hookup	Joseph Henabery (director); Radio Ramblers	April 3, 1937	
The Lifers of the Party	Roy Mack (director); the Yacht Club Boys	April 17, 1937	
Home Run on the Keys	Roy Mack (director); Babe Ruth, Byron Gay & Zez Confrey	April 24, 1937	
A Musical Operation	Roy Mack (director); the Norsemen, Frank Gaby, Virginia Verrill & Gloria Gilbert	May 24, 1937	
Double Talk	Lloyd French (director); Edgar Bergen (& Charlie McCarthy)	June 26, 1937	Hollywood Hotel (film) DVD
A Neckin' Party	Lloyd French (director); Edgar Bergen (& Charlie McCarthy)	September 4, 1937	Variety Show (1937 film) (Busby Berkeley Collection 2) DVD
Puppet Love	Lloyd French (director); Salici's puppets	September 18, 1937 (BoxOffice review)	in color
Roping 'Em Alive	Ira Genet (editor); Basil Ruysdael (narrator)	November 6, 1937	travelogue footage of African tribes and India
Vitaphone Frolics	Stanley Brothers, Jack & Loretta Clemens, Zeb Carver & his Cousins & L.I.M.E. Trio	November 27, 1937	
Vitaphone Capers	The Downing Sisters with Elaine Downing, Raphael, Swor & Lubin Joe Termini & Co.	© December 22, 1937	
Unreal Newsreel	Eddie Forman; Paul Douglas (narrator)	January 8, 1938	
Ski Flight: A Document of Skiing According to the Principles of Hannes	Otto Lang & Jerome Hill (directors); Howard Claney (narrator)	February 4, 1938	sport reel filmed at Mount Whitney and Mount Baker, California
Alibi Time	Roy Mack (director); Radio Ramblers, Jose Dawning, Edith Roarke & Morgan Conway	February 12, 1938	
Vitaphone Gambols	Lloyd French (director); the ABC Trio, Masters & Rollins, Chaz Chase, Elaine Dowling & the Tip Top Girls	March 19, 1938	
Mr. and Mrs. Jesse Crawford	Lloyd French (director); Mr. & Mrs. Jesse Crawford, Lynn Martin, Sam Moseby & the Foremen Quartet	April 11, 1938	
The Juggling Fool	Lloyd French (director); Bobby May & Anita Simpson	May 14, 1938	
Table Manners	Lloyd French (director); Clem McCarthy	October 15, 1938	Sports reel on table tennis.
A Vaudeville Interlude	Bert & Betty, Gaudsmith Brothers, Hamonica Scamps with Murray Lane	November 19, 1938	
Robbin' Good	Louis Zingone	December 10, 1938	
Radio and Relatives	Roy Mack (director); Jack Waldron, Rob Nichols, Laura Deane and Garner, Wolfe & Hakins	© December 30, 1938	
Ski Girl	Ira Genet (director); Dwight Weist (narrator)	January 14, 1939	
The Nine Million	Roy Mack (director); Burnet Hershey	February 4, 1939	newsreel documentary about the rise of Fascism
Gadgeteers	Joseph Henabery (director); Warren Asche, Marjorie Stafford & Fred Harper	February 18, 1939	
The Crawfords At Home	Lloyd French (director); Mr. & Mrs. Jesse Crawford, Judith Barron, Bill Johnson, Crawford & Caskey	April 15, 1939	Invisible Stripes DVD & Vitaphone Cavalcade of Musical Comedy Shorts (Warner Archive) DVD
Dean of Pasteboards	Lloyd French (director); Louis Zingone	May 27, 1939	
One Day Stand	Ira Genet (director); Dwight Weist (narrator); Clyde Beatty & his animal acts	August 19, 1939	
History Repeats Itself	Lloyd French (director); Radio Rogues	October 10, 1939	
An Organ Novelty with the Three Crawfords	Joseph Henabery (narrator); Mr. & Mrs. Jesse Crawford, Miriam Graham & Robert Simmons	October 25, 1939	
All Girl Revue	Lloyd French (director); June Allyson, Harrison Sisters, Betty Moe, Beverly Crane and Beverly Kirk	June 22, 1940 (filmed July '39)	The Roaring Twenties (Greatest Gangster Films Prohibition Era) DVD

== Hollywood Novelties / Warner Novelties (1940–1953) ==
Most of these were completed in California, explaining the change in series name. In the mid-forties, the studio reverted to the old "Vitaphone Varieties" logo with a number of titles, although these black and white documentaries (all running 8–11 minutes in length) were very different than the twenties and thirties musical and comedy acts. After a few years absence, they were revived as "Warner Novelties", consisting mostly of newsreel and earlier recycled footage stretching past the decades. Excluded from the following list (for space reasons) are the first two Joe McDoakes comedies of 1942 that were issued under the Hollywood Novelty logo, those featuring archery expert Howard Hill and compilation director Robert Youngson. See their articles for further information.

Title	Major credits	Release, copyright or review date	Additional notes
Mexican Jumping Beans	Eddie Davis (director); music: Howard Jackson; narrator: Knox Manning	© December 7, 1940	
Polo with the Stars	producer: Myron J. Schwartz; director: Paul R. Thoma; music: Howard Jackson; narrator: Knox Manning	September 20, 1941	Features Joe E. Brown, Jack Holt & Buddy Rogers
Miracle Makers	Owen Crump (director); music: Rex Dunn; narrator: Knox Manning	September 20, 1941	Docu-reel on "sources of power" like water
White Sails	producer: Walter Fulter; director: Owen Crump; music: Howard Jackson	© November 8, 1941	ship travelogue edited from a British documentary
Then and Now	music: Howard Jackson; narrator: Knox Manning	© December 24, 1941	documentary on trains and autos
Wedding Yells	narration written by: Joel Malone and Rich Hall; narrator: Jack Carson	March 7, 1942	re-edit of Mack Sennett's silent Down on the Farm
Ring of Steel	director: Garson Kanin; narrator: Spencer Tracy	April 2, 1942	military short
There Ain't No Such Animal	producers/directors: Joel Maline & Rich Hall; music: William Lava; narrator: Knox Manning	May 9, 1942	Visits Australia's Great Barrier Reef
This Is Your Enemy	credited: Archibald MacLeish; music: Howard Jackson & William Lava; narrator: Knox Manning	January 23, 1943	footage of the Nazi invasion of Poland
Stars on Horseback	producer: Myron J. Schwartz; music: William Lava; narrator: Lou Marcelle	April 3, 1943	DVD release: Old Acquaintance (Greatest Classic Legends Bette Davis). Showcases George Garfield, blacksmith for Hollywood
Happy Times and Jolly Moments	narration written by: James Bloodworth; narrator: Lou Marcelle	July 10, 1943	vintage Sennett material
Bees A'Buzzin'	producer: Gordon Hollingshead; director: Roger Q. Denny; music: Howard Jackson; narrator: Lou Marcelle	September 18, 1943	Made with the association of the International Bees Producers Association.
Our Alaskan Frontier	director: Carl Dudley; music: Howard Jackson; narrator: Lou Marcelle	November 6, 1943	travelogue
The Struggle for Life	director: Roger Q. Denny; music: Rex Dunn; narrator: Art Gilmore	March 4, 1944	edited from a Soviet nature documentary
Jungle Thrills	director: Roger Q. Denny; music: Howard Jackson; narrator: Lou Marcelle	April 15, 1944	
Road to Victory	producer: Gordon Hollingshead; director: Le Roy Prinz	May 13, 1944	Semi-promotional for Fifth War Loan Campaign
Throwing the Bull	director: Augustin Delgado; narrator: James A. Fitzpatrick	July 29, 1944	A Mexican bullfight.
Their Dizzy Day	director: Mervyn Freeman; story: Roger Q. Denny; music: Howard Jackson; narrator: George O'Hanlon	September 2, 1944	A day with four lion cubs. This and subsequent 1944-45 titles were marketed as "Vitaphone Varieties"
Ski-Whizz	producer: Blackwood Grant; director: Alan Francis Corby; music: Howard Jackson; narrator: Art Gilmore	October 7, 1944	ski reel
Once Over Lightly	narration written by: James Bloodworth; narrator: George O'Hanlon	October 14, 1944	vintage Sennett material
Overseas Roundup #1	music: Howard Jackson & William Lava	March 17, 1945	Covers news from the war front. A Nazi submarine is attacked / military recreation at Bougainville / Persian transport of goods to Soviet forces / Merrill's Marauders in Burma / Hollywood entertainers overseas
Overseas Roundup #2		May 26, 1945	Segments: life on a troopship / rat-catching in the tropical Pacific / the medical corps in action / an Australian rodeo
Overseas Roundup #3		July 14, 1945 (previewed May 19)	Segments: a helicopter saving stranded Marines / how coffee is supplied to troops / Chinese soldiers in training / GI salutes on the radio
Alice in Jungleland	director: Marjorie Freeman; music: Rex Dunn; narrator: Marvin Miller	September 22, 1945	
Story of a Dog	producer: Gordon Hollingshead; director: Saul Elkins; music: William Lava; narrator: Knox Manning	October 27, 1945	Nominee for Academy Award for Best Live Action Short Film, available on DVD for San Antonio (film). A Doberman Pinscher trains for Coast Guard War Unit at Curtis Bay, Maryland.
Good Old Corn	narration written by: Saul Elkins; film editor: Everett A. Dodd; music: William Lava; sound: Charles David Forrest; narrator: Knox Manning	November 24, 1945	vintage Mack Sennett and Larry Semon material
Peeks at Hollywood	producer: Gene Lester; director: Irving Applebaum; music: Howard Jackson; narrator: Knox Manning	January 26, 1946	on DVD San Antonio (film). Hollywood celebrities are seen by two ladies from Griffith Observatory.
Smart as a Fox	producer: Gordon Hollingshead; story: Saul Elkins; music: William Lava; camera: Viktor Asmus; narrator: Knox Manning	April 27, 1946	Life of a fox in a Soviet forest. Nominee for Academy Award for Best Live Action Short Film
Pie in the Eye	music: Howard Jackson; narrator: Art Gilmore	December 24, 1948	vintage Sennett material
Just For Fun	Narration written by: Charles Tedford; narrator: Art Gilmore	April 1949	adapted from Larry Semon and Mack Sennett comedies
Horse and Buggy Days	producer: Gordon Hollingshead; director: Owen Crump; music: Howard Jackson; narrator: Art Gilmore	October 21, 1949	
Those Who Dance	producer: Gordon Hollingshead; music: Howard Jackson; narrator: Art Gilmore	December 1949	
Hands Tell the Story	directors: Hal Seeger & Edwin Kasper; music: William Lava; narrator: Art Gilmore	February 4, 1950	
Slap Happy	music: William Lava; narrator: Art Gilmore	October 14, 1950 (completed 1948)	footage of Ben Turpin with Mack Sennett in the 1920s
Animal Antics	music: Howard Jackson; narrator: Art Gilmore	January 20, 1951	vintage Sennett material
The Naughty Twenties	Charles Tedford (director)	February 10, 1951	includes clips of Van & Schenck & Willie and Eugene Howard
Anything For Laughs	music: Howard Jackson & William Lava; narrator: George O'Hanlon	April 21, 1951	re-edit of Larry Semon's silent The Show (1922 Vitagraph).
To Bee or Not to Bee	music: William Lava; narrator: Art Gilmore;	September 15, 1951	re-edit of Fatty Arbuckle in Buzzin' Around.
Stop, Look and Laugh	music: William Lava	October 20, 1951	re-edit of Larry Semon's silent The Saw Mill (1921 Vitagraph).
Ain't Rio Grand?	director: James Bloodworth; music: William Lava; narrator: Art Gilmore	December 2, 1951	re-edit of Larry Semon's silent Well I'll Be (1919 Vitagraph).
Songs of All Nations	producer: Gordon Hollingshead; director: Jack Scholl	February 16, 1952	
Orange Blossoms for Violet	directors: Friz Freleng & Chuck Jones; music: Howard Jackson; narrator: Robert C. Bruce with Mel Blanc & Bea Benaderet	May 24, 1952	featured on Looney Tunes Golden Collection: Volume 2, culled from Hal Roach 1923 "Dippy Dood-Dad" series.
Here We Go Again	director: Charles L. Tedford; music: Howard Jackson; narrator: Art Gilmore	© November 15, 1952	edited from a 1921 Mack Sennett First National comedy, Hard Knocks and Love Taps starring Charlie Murray
Hit 'Im Again	narration by: Charles L. Tedford; edited by: DeLeon Anthony; music: Howard Jackson; narrated by: Art Gilmore; sound: David Forrest	September 5, 1953	re-edit of Larry Semon's silent Horseshoes (1923 Vitagraph).

== See also ==
- List of vaudeville performers: A-K (many appearing in the films)
- List of vaudeville performers: L-Z
- Sound film
- Vitaphone
- Warner Bros.
- List of short subjects by Hollywood studio#Warner Brothers
