= Sports Parade =

Short film series

The Sports Parade (a.k.a. “The Sport Parade”) was a short film series of Warner Bros. that was regularly shown before the main studio feature, along with another Warner-Vitaphone short, Joe McDoakes comedy and/or Looney Tunes and Merrie Melodies cartoons. The average running time of each film was between nine and eleven minutes.

== Overview ==
Virtually all of these were filmed in Technicolor. (A few early ones used Cinecolor as it gradually replaced the Vitaphone Color Parade on Warner’s short subject program.) This gave them an advantage over rival series like Paramount Sportlights with Grantland Rice, Columbia World of Sports, RKO Pathé Sportscopes, Universal Variety Views, and MGM Pete Smith “Football Thrills”, which used color sparingly for special entries. Warner’s most prolific competitor in Technicolor live-action shorts, 20th Century-Fox, produced only 20 out of 100+ Movietone Sports Reviews from the late thirties through early fifties in color. In the era before television, it was considered more economical to shoot in black and white like the newsreels.

Although Warner Bros. separated this series from its less sports-oriented series Technicolor Adventure (film series) during the later 1940s, many post-war Sports Parades resembled high quality color travelogues of the period, showcasing a variety of recreational pursuits in the Caribbean, South America, Europe, Egypt, India and Australia. André de la Varre supervised many of the best international productions, while Edwin E. Olsen and ski expert Dick Durrance were particularly skilled at using hand-held cameras for up-front action shots. Howard Hill specialized in archery and Van Campen Heilner handled many fishing and camping reels for both Warner and studio rival RKO. Despite lacking high profile sports news commentators, key radio veterans like Art Gilmore and Marvin Miller put a lot of energy and enthusiasm into their narration.

The series won three Academy Awards and was nominated three other times. Despite being phased out in 1956, they were successfully reissued throughout the sixties since many of the topics had a timeless appeal and were always popular at the box office.

== List of titles ==
Below is a listing of titles by year of release, listed by title / major credits / release date / notes of interest. Only a few have made DVD release.

=== 1940 ===
Title	Major credits	Release date	Notes
Football Highlights (Football Thrills)	De Leon Anthony; narrator: Wendell Niles	August 31 (preview)	Overview of newsreel clips includes scenes with Knute Rockne (some footage in black & white)
Fly Fishing	Dick Miller & Del Frazier; music: Rex Dunn; narrator: Wendell Niles	September 21	
Diary of a Racing Pigeon	producer: Gordon Hollingshead; director: Del Frazier; music: Howard Jackson; narrator: Knox Manning	November 30	birds showcased
California Thoroughbreds	director: Del Frazier; music: Howard Jackson; narrator: Wendell Niles	December 22	

=== 1941 ===
Title	Major credits	Release date	Notes
Fight, Fish, Fight	Bob Edge (director); music: Rex Dunn; narrator: Wendell Niles	March 1	Hunting marlin in New Zealand
Sky Sailing	music: William Lava; narrator: Knox Manning	April 19	Covers sport of gliding
Big Bill Tilden	producer: Gordon Hollingshead; director: Del Frazier; music: William Lava; narrator: John Deering	May 24	Tennis reel with Bill Tilden
Sail Ho	co-produced by Cinesound Productions; director: Del Frazier; music: Rex Dunn; narrator: Knox Manning	June 14	Following a sailor in Australia
It Happens on Rollers	director: Del Frazier; music: William Lava; narrator: Knox Manning	July 12	Features Gloria Nordskog
Lions for Sale	producer: Gordon Hollingshead; director: Del Frazier; music: Rex Dunn; narrator: Knox Manning	August 9	Sometimes billed as a “Color Parade”, filmed in a two-color process. Covers lions trained for circuses. On DVD for Sergeant York.
Kings of the Turf	producer: Gordon Hollingshead; director: Del Frazier; writer: Harold Medford; music: Rex Dunn; narrator: Knox Manning	September 27	Covers Mortimer, a horse, being trained for harness racing. Nominee for Academy Award for Best Live Action Short Film. Included on DVD of The Great Lie.
Water Sports	director: Del Frazier; music: William Lava; narrator: Knox Manning	November 1	Shot mostly at Beverly Hills pool
King Salmon	director: Del Frazier; music: Rex Dunn; narrator: Knox Manning	December 20	Profiles the fish life cycle.

=== 1942 ===
Title	Major credits	Release date	Notes
Rodeo Roundup	director: Del Frazier; music: Howard Jackson	January 31	Features Montie Montana
Hunting Dogs at Work	director: Del Frazier; music: William Lava; narrator: Knox Manning	February 20	
Shoot Yourself Some Golf	producer: Gordon Hollingshead; director: Del Frazier; music: William Lava	April 4	Jimmy Thomson instructs Ronald Reagan and Jane Wyman. DVD release with Gentleman Jim (film)
Rocky Mountain Big Game	director: Bob Edge; music: Rex Dunn; narrator: Knox Manning	May 2	Hiking in the Rockies, terrain of the bighorn sheep. DVD release Captains of the Clouds
Hatteras Honkers	director: Del Frazier; music: Rex Dunn; narrator: Knox Manning	June 6	Fishing at Cape Hatteras
A Hunter's Paradise	director: Del Frazier; narrator: Knox Manning	July 11	Covers jaguar and other wildlife in Matto Grasso (Brazil).
Argentine Horses	director: Del Frazier; music: Rex Dunn; narrator: Knox Manning	August 8	
Sniffer Soldiers	director: Del Frazier; music: William Lava	September 12	Training U.S. Army dogs at Fort MacArthur in San Pedro, Los Angeles.
South American Sports	directors: Del Frazier & James Bloodworth; music: Howard Jackson; narrator: Knox Manning	October 17	Mostly covering Argentina
The Right Timing	director: Del Frazier; music: William Lava; narrator: Art Gilmore	October 31	Showcases USC athletes in training. A DVD extra with Gentleman Jim (film)
America's Battle of Beauty	music: Howard Jackson; narrator: Knox Manning & Sidney Blackmer	November 21	Travelogue comparing California with Florida in their recreational pursuits.
Horses! Horses! Horses!	music: Howard Jackson; narrator: Knox Manning	December 26	

=== 1943 ===
Title	Major credits	Release date	Notes
Cuba, Land of Adventure and Sport	music: Howard Jackson; narrator: Knox Manning	January 16	vintage Cuba recreation
Women in Sports	director: Del Frazier; music: William Lava; narrator: Knox Manning	February 20	
Sporting Dogs	music: Howard Jackson; narrator: Knox Manning	March 20	
With Rod and Reel on Anticosti Island	producer: A. Pam Blumenthal; director: Van Campen Heilner; music: Howard Jackson	May 1	Canadian fishing reel shot at Anticosti Island
Rover's Rangers	director: Larry Lansburgh; music: William Lava; narrator: Art Gilmore	May 22	Working dogs in agriculture and the Red Cross.
Grey, White and Blue	producer: A. Pam Blumenthall; director: Van Campen Heilner; music: William Lava; narrator: Lou Marcelle	June 19	Profiles geese and other wildlife in Mississippi, Sacramento Valley and Cape Hatteras
Snow Sports	producers: A. Pam Blumenthal & Van Campen Heilner; director: André de la Varre; music: William Lava; narrator: Art Gilmore	July 24	Sports at Lake Placid, New York
Dude Ranch Buckaroos	producer: Gordon Hollingshead; director: Arnold Albert; music: Howard Jackson; narrator: Lou Marcelle	August 14	Horse-riding and lassoing in California
Tropical Sportland	producers: A. Pam Blumenthal & Van Campen Heilner; director: André de la Varre; music: William Lava; narrator: Sidney Blackmer	October 9	Florida travelogue
Desert Playground	producer: Gordon Hollingshead; director: Arnold Albert; music: Howard Jackson; narrator: Art Gilmore	November 13	Tour of Palm Springs, California

=== 1944 ===
Title	Major credits	Release date	Notes
Into the Clouds	director: James Bloodworth; music: William Lava; narrator: Lou Marcelle	January 1	Ski troops train at Camp Hale and Mount McKinley.
Baa, Baa, Blacksheep	producer: Gordon Hollingshead; director: André de la Varre; music: Howard Jackson; narrator: Knox Manning	January 22	Montana ranching
Dogie Roundup	producers: A. Pam Blumenthal & Van Campen Heilner; director: André de la Varre; music: William Lava; narrator: Knox Manning	February 26	Montana ranching
Chinatown Champs	producers: A. Pam Blumenthal & Van Campen Heilner; director: André de la Varre; music: Howard Jackson; narrator: Knox Manning	March 18	Tour of Chinatown, San Francisco
Backyard Golf	producers: A. Pam Blumenthal & Van Campen Heilner; director: André de la Varre; music: Howard Jackson; narrator: Knox Manning	April 22	
Mexican Sportland	Luis Osorno Barona; narrator: Knox Manning	May 13	Mexico travelogue
Filipino Sports Parade	Howard Hill; music: William Lava; narrator: Knox Manning	June 17	Howard Hill makes an appearance with ex-natives training at Camp Cook in California.
Cattlemen's Days	producers: A. Pam Blumenthal & Van Campen Heilner; director: André de la Varre; music: Howard Jackson; narrator: Knox Manning	June 24	Rodeo reel
Colorado Trout	producers: A. Pam Blumenthal & Van Campen Heilner; director: André de la Varre; music: Howard Jackson; narrator: Sam Balter	July 1	
Bluenose Schooner	National Film Board of Canada directed by: Eduard Buckman & Douglas Sinclair; music: Rex Dunn	August 4	Canadian release: December 1943. Initially 20 minutes but cut down to one-reel. Covers a Nova Scotia fishing fleet.
Champions of the Future	Howard Hill; music: Howard Jackson; narrator: Sam Balter	November 18	Covers children and sports
California, Here We Are	music: Howard Jackson; narrator: Knox Manning	December 18	travelogue
Cuba Calling	producers: A. Pam Blumenthal & André de la Varre; director: Van Campen Heilner; music: Howard Jackson; narrator: Sam Balter	December 23	Cuba recreation
The Birds and the Beasts Were There	producers: A. Pam Blumenthal & Van Campen Heilner: director: André de la Varre; music: Rex Dunn; narrator: Knox Manning	December 30	Covers Jungle Island in Miami, Florida

=== 1945 ===
Title	Major credits	Release date	Notes
Glamour in Sports	producers: A. Pam Blumenthal & Van Campen Heilner: director: André de la Varre; music: Howard Jackson; narrator: Knox Manning	January 13	Covers female athletes at Rollins College (Florida)
Bikes and Skis	producers: A. Pam Blumenthal & Van Campen Heilner: director: André de la Varre; music: Howard Jackson; narrator: Sam Balter	February 10	Tour of Cypress Gardens (Florida)
Swimcapades	producers: A. Pam Blumenthal & Van Campen Heilner: director: André de la Varre; music: Howard Jackson; narrator: Knox Manning	April 7	Silver Springs, Florida
Water Babies	producers: A. Pam Blumenthal & Van Campen Heilner: director: André de la Varre; music: Howard Jackson	May 19	Children sports in Florida
Mexican Sea Sports	producer: Gordon Hollingshead; director: Luis Osorno Barona; music: Rex Dunn	May 26	Filmed in Acapulco
Bahama Sea Sports	producers: A. Pam Blumenthal & André de la Varre: Van Campen Heilner; music: Howard Jackson; narrator: Knox Manning	June 23	Bahamas spear fishing
Flivver Flying	producer: Gordon Hollingshead; director: Randolph Clarity; music: Rex Dunn	June 30	Contrasts new and antique planes and autos.
Sports Go to War	producers: A. Pam Blumenthal & André de la Varre; director: Van Campen Heilner; music: Howard Jackson; narrator: Knox Manning	September 29	Focus is on Canadian soldiers in training
Arabians in the Rockies	producers: A. Pam Blumenthal & Van Campen Heilner: director: André de la Varre; music: Rex Dunn; narrator: Knox Manning	December 15	horse reel
Days of '76	producers: A. Pam Blumenthal & Van Campen Heilner: director: André de la Varre; music: Howard Jackson; narrator: Roger Q. Denny	December 22	Covers a festival at Deadwood, South Dakota

=== 1946 ===
Title	Major credits	Release date	Notes
Cavalcade of Archery	Howard Hill; music: Rex Dunn; narrator: Knox Manning	January 12	Howard Hill demonstrates his archery skills. An extra on the two-disc version of The Adventures of Robin Hood (film) DVD.
Holiday On Horseback	producers: A. Pam Blumenthal & Van Campen Heilner: director: André de la Varre; music: Howard Jackson; narrator: Knox Manning	February 2	Hiking in the Colorado Rockies
Michigan Ski-Daddle	producers: A. Pam Blumenthal & Van Campen Heilner: director: André de la Varre; music: Rex Dunn; narrator: Knox Manning	February 9	Shot at Lake Macatawa
With Rod and Gun in Canada	producers: A. Pam Blumenthal & André de la Varre; director: Van Campen Heilner; music: Howard Jackson; narrator: Knox Manning	March 16	
Snow Eagles	producers: A. Pam Blumenthal & André de la Varre; director: Van Campen Heilner; music: Howard Jackson; narrator: Knox Manning	March 30	skiing in Canada's Laurentian Mountains
Let's Go Gunning	producers: A. Pam Blumenthal & André de la Varre; director: Van Campen Heilner; music: Rex Dunn; narrator: Knox Manning	April 6	
Fin 'N Feathers	producers: A. Pam Blumenthal & André de la Varre; director: Van Campen Heilner; music: Howard Jackson; narrator: Knox Manning	April 27	Canadian duck and pheasant hunting
Facing Your Danger	producer: Gordon Hollingshead; director: Edwin E. Olsen & De Leon Anthony; music: Rex Dunn; narrator: Knox Manning	May 11	(© December 23, 1945); Riding the white rapids of the Colorado River through the Grand Canyon. Won Academy Award for Best Live Action Short Film and included as an extra with the DVD Deception (1946 film)
Underwater Spearfishing	producer: Gordon Hollingshead; director: Frederick J. McEvoy; music: Howard Jackson & Maxwell; narrator: Knox Manning	May 18	(© December 27, 1945) Filmed in Acapulco
The Riding Hannefords	producer: Gordon Hollingshead; director: Edwin E. Olsen; music: Howard Jackson	June 29	Covers a circus family
Beach Days	André de la Varre & Saul Elkins; music: Howard Jackson; narrator: Knox Manning	July 13	Comic reel of recreation
Ranch in White	André de la Varre & Del Frazier; music: Howard Jackson & Vaughan; narrator: Knox Manning	August 3	Nebraska horse ranch
The Dominion of Sports	Van Campen Heilner; music: Howard Jackson; narrator: Knox Manning	August 31	Canadian travelogue
King of the Everglades	André de la Varre; music: Rex Dunn	September 14	Florida reptiles and critters handled by expert Ross Allen
The Lazy Hunter	Howard Hill; music: Howard Jackson; narrator: Knox Manning	October 26	Tracking coyote and hawk
Las Vegas, Frontier Town	music: Howard Jackson	December 20 (preview; wide release November 1, 1947)	

=== 1947 ===
Title	Major credits	Release date	Notes
Let's Go Swimming	producer: Gordon Hollingshead; director: Frederick Richards; music: Howard Jackson; narrator: Art Gilmore	January 4	
Battle of Champs	producer: Gordon Hollingshead; director: Edward E. Olson; music: Howard Jackson; narrator: Knox Manning	January 18	Unusual golf game is played by Howard Hill, Lou Novikoff and Dick Muller
American Sports Album	producer: Gordon Hollingshead; director: Charles Tedford; music: William Lava; narrator: Knox Manning	March 8	
Arrow Magic	Charles Trego & Aude Vail; music: Howard Jackson	March 22	
Harness Racing	Harry O. Hoyt; music: William Lava; narrator: Knox Manning	May 3	
Flying Sportsman in Jamaica	producer: Gordon Hollingshead; director: Charles Tedford; music: Howard Jackson; narrator: Truman Bradley)	May 17	Specifically cricket and rafting
A Day at Hollywood Park	Harry O. Hoyt; music: William Lava; narrator: Knox Manning	June 7	horse racing (filmed 1946) The Story of Seabiscuit DVD
Tennis Town	producer: Gordon Hollingshead; director: Saul Elkins; music: Howard Jackson; narrator: Knox Manning	June 21	With the U.S. Lawn Tennis Association (1946)
Sportsman's Playground	producer: Gordon Hollingshead; director: Charles Tedford; music: Howard Jackson; narrator: Truman Bradley	July 5	Caribbean tour
Carnival of Sports	producer: Gordon Hollingshead; director: Charles Tedford; music: Rex Dunn; narrator: Truman Bradley	August 23	Sports in Venezuela
Fishing the Florida Keys	Joseph Gibson; music: Rex Dunn	September 27	
A Trip To Sportland	producer: Gordon Hollingshead; director: Charles Tedford; music: Howard Jackson; narrator: Truman Bradley	December 2	Travelogue of Chile
Action in Sports	producer: Gordon Hollingshead; director: Charles Tedford; music: Howard Jackson; narrator: Truman Bradley	December 13	Covers Peru

=== 1948 ===
Title	Major credits	Release date	Notes
Sun Valley Fun	producer: Gordon Hollingshead; Charles Tedford (writer); music: Howard Jackson; narrator: Art Gilmore	February 14	Sun Valley, Idaho (Filmed May 1947)
Ride, Ranchero, Ride	producer: Gordon Hollingshead; director: Roger Sumner; music: Howard Jackson; narrator: Truman Bradley	March 20	Covers California’s Los Rancheros visitadores
Holiday For Sports	producer: Gordon Hollingshead; director: Charles Tedford; music: Howard Jackson; narrator: Truman Bradley	April 17	Horse-racing in Argentina (mostly filmed in 1946)
Fighting Athletes	producer: Gordon Hollingshead; director: Saul Elkins; music: William Lava; narrator: Art Gilmore	May 1	Sports in the India Army
Built For Speed	producer: Gordon Hollingshead; director: Robert Adams; music: Howard Jackson; narrator: Knox Manning	June 5	Covers midget auto racing (in 1947)
The Race Rider	Harry O. Hoyt; music: Howard Jackson; narrator: Knox Manning	June 19	Shots of jockeys in training
A Nation on Skis	Douglas Sinclair; music: Howard Jackson; narrator: Truman Bradley	July 31	tour of Norway
Playtime in Rio	Charles Tedford; music: Howard Jackson; narrator: Truman Bradley	August 17	Views of the Cariocas of Rio de Janeiro
Sitzmarks the Spot	Associated Screen News of Canada; director: Gordon Sparling	September (Canada); March 11, 1950 (US)	Ski reel initially released as a “Canadian Cameo”
Sports Down Under	director: Arthur Collins; music: Howard Jackson; narrator: Truman Bradley	September 19	Australia travelogue (filmed April 1947)
Gauchos of the Pampas	producer: Gordon Hollingshead; director: Owen Crump; story: Charles L. Tedford; music: William Lava; narrator: Truman Bradley	October 9	Filmed in Uruguay's San Pedro O'Timore ranch (filmed mostly in 1946)
Sportsmen of the Far East	producer: Gordon Hollingshead; director: Charles Tedford; music: William Lava; narrator: Knox Manning	December 18	Scenic tour of Bombay.
Cinderella Horse	producer: Gordon Hollingshead; director: Harry O. Hoyt; music: Howard Jackson; narrator: Art Gilmore	December 26 (preview)	Tale of a thoroughbred. Nominee for the Academy Award for Best Live Action Short Film

=== 1949 ===
Title	Major credits	Release date	Notes
Royal Duck Shoot	producer: Gordon Hollingshead; director: Charles Tedford; music: William Lava; narrator: Marvin Miller	January 22	More India travelogue footage with the Maharajah of Bharatpur State
Water Wonderland	producer: Gordon Hollingshead; director: Charles Tedford & Virgil Ellsworth; music: Howard Jackson; narrator: Art Gilmore	March 5	shot at Newport Beach, California
Sport of Millions	producer: Gordon Hollingshead; director: music: Howard Jackson; narrator: Knox Manning	March 25	Clips of horse races
English Outings	producer: Gordon Hollingshead; director: Edwin E. Olsen; story: Charles Tedford; music: Howard Jackson; narrator: Marvin Miller	May 14	Covers British dog trials, horse racing and the regatta.
Dude Rancheroos	producer: Gordon Hollingshead; director: story: Charles Tedford; Rex Steele (editor); music: Howard Jackson; narrator: Art Gilmore	June 4	rodeo reel
Highland Games	producer: Gordon Hollingshead; director: Charles Tedford; music: Howard Jackson; narrator: Marvin Miller	July 2	Tour of Scotland in 1948.
Daredevils on Wheels	producer: Gordon Hollingshead; director: Charles Tedford; music: Howard Jackson; narrator: Marvin Miller	July 23	Profiles British motorcycles.
Water Wizards	producer: Gordon Hollingshead; director: Saul Elkins & André de la Varre; music: Howard Jackson; narrator: Art Gilmore	August 6	
Sports Old and New (Cavalcade of Egyptian Sports)	producer: Gordon Hollingshead; director: Charles Tedford; music: William Lava; narrator: Knox Manning	August 20	Shot in Egypt
Hunting the Fox	John McManus & David Henry Ahlers; music: William Lava	September 2	Filmed in England (1948)
The Little Archer	producer: Gordon Hollingshead; director: Patsie Sinkey; music: Howard Jackson; narrator: Marvin Miller	October 8	4-year old Melvin Beebe shows his archery skill. Included on Johnny Belinda (1948 film) DVD
King(s) of the Rockies	producer: Gordon Hollingshead; director: André de la Varre; music: William Lava; narrator: Art Gilmore	November 19	Horse ranching
Happy Holidays	producer: Gordon Hollingshead; director: Ted Stauffer; music: William Lava; narrator: Art Gilmore	December 10	Tour of Acapulco

=== 1950 ===
Title	Major credits	Release date	Notes
Let's Go Boating	producer: Gordon Hollingshead; director: André de la Varre; music: William Lava; narrator: Art Gilmore	January 21	
That's Bully	producer: Gordon Hollingshead; director: André de la Varre; music: William Lava; narrator: Art Gilmore	February 18	Covers San Fermin festival in Pamplona (Spain) and the running of the bulls. (filmed 1948)
This Sporting World	producer: Gordon Hollingshead; director: Charles Tedford; music: William Lava; narrator: Art Gilmore	March 25	compilation reel
Cowboy's Holiday	Associated Screen News of Canada; director: Gordon Sparling	May (Canada); November 3 (US)	Rodeo reel initially released as a “Canadian Cameo”
Alpine Champions	producer: Gordon Hollingshead; director: Charles Tedford; music: William Lava; narrator: Art Gilmore	May 6	Switzerland skiing
Riviera Days	director: André de la Varre; music: William Lava; narrator: Art Gilmore	June 3	Tour of France and Monaco.
Racing Thrills	Gordon Hollingshead; music: William Lava; narrator: Art Gilmore	July 8	Florida horse-racing
Champions of Tomorrow	music: William Lava; narrator: Art Gilmore	August 19	Covers 1949 gymnastics at San Fernando
Grandad of Races	producer: Gordon Hollingshead; director: André de la Varre; music: William Lava; narrator: Art Gilmore	September 2	Profiles the famous Palio horse race of Siena (Italy) held in July (1949). Won the Academy Award for Best Live Action Short Film An extra with the DVD for The West Point Story (film).
Wild Water Champions	producer: Gordon Hollingshead; director: André de la Varre; music: Howard Jackson; narrator: Art Gilmore	September 2	Profiles kayak racing in Steyr AUG, Australia
Paddle Your Own Canoe	music: Howard Jackson; narrator: Art Gilmore	October 21	Visiting the Taylor Statten Camps in Ontario, where Carl Laurier demonstrates his skills.

=== 1951 ===
Title	Major credits	Release date	Notes
Ski in the Sky	Associated Screen News of Canada; director: Gordon Sparling; narrator: Dwight Weist	January 13	Ski reel initially released as a “Canadian Cameo”
The Will to Win	Harry O. Hoyt; music: William Lava; narrator: Art Gilmore	February 24	Features jockey Gordon Glisson
Rocky Eden	Associated Screen News of Canada	April 7	National Parks tour of Canada, shot in Ansco Color, initially released as a “Canadian Cameo”
Hawaiian Sports	Carl Dudley; music: Howard Jackson; narrator: Art Gilmore	May 12	Highlight is surfing
Making Mounties	Associated Screen News of Canada; director: Gordon Sparling; narrator: Lamont Tilden	June 14	Initially released as a “Canadian Cameo” in AnscoColor
Kings of the Outdoors	music: Howard Jackson; narrator: Art Gilmore	August 18	horse reel
Glamour in Tennis	producer: Gordon Hollingshead; director: Miklos Dora & André de la Varre; music: Howard Jackson	September 6	Features Nancy Chaffee
Art of Archery	Howard Hill; music: William Lava; narrator: Art Gilmore	October 6	
Every Dog Has His Day	music: William Lava; narrator: Art Gilmore	December 22	Profiles various working breeds, some footage recycled from earlier shorts.

=== 1952 ===
Title	Major credits	Release date	Notes
Dutch Treat in Sports	producer: Gordon Hollingshead; director: André de la Varre; music: Howard Jackson; narrator: Art Gilmore	February 2	Special focus on Netherlands horse-racing
Emperor's Horses	producer: Gordon Hollingshead; director: André de la Varre; music: William Lava; narrator: Art Gilmore	March 1	tour of Vienna and the Lipizzaner
Switzerland Sportland	producer: Gordon Hollingshead; director: André de la Varre; music: Howard Jackson; narrator: Art Gilmore	May 10	Switzerland travelogue includes rowing in Lucene and gymnastics.
Centennial Sports	producer: Gordon Hollingshead; director: Arthur Collins; music: William Lava; narrator: Art Gilmore	June 28	Profiles the Canterbury Games of New Zealand
Snow Frolics	producer: Gordon Hollingshead; director: André de la Varre; music: William Lava; narrator: Art Gilmore	July 26	Canadian sports-reel shot in Sainte-Agathe-des-Monts
Just for Sport	producer: Gordon Hollingshead; director: André de la Varre; narrator: Art Gilmore	August 23	
They Fly through the Air	producer: Gordon Hollingshead; director: Owen Crump; music: Howard Jackson	October 4	Covers parachute testing at Naval Air Facility El Centro
Unfamiliar Sports	producer: Gordon Hollingshead; director: André de la Varre; music: William Lava; narrator: Art Gilmore	November 1	
Fiesta for Sports	producer: Gordon Hollingshead; director: André de la Varre; music: William Lava; narrator: Art Gilmore	December 20	More in Argentina
Desert Killer	producer: Gordon Hollingshead; director: Larry Lansburgh; music: William Lava; narrator: Art Gilmore	December 25 (preview; general release June 27, 1953)	Marvin Glenn tracks a sheep-killing cougar in the Arizona Chiricahua. Nominee for Academy Award for Best Live Action Short Film. A DVD extra on Starlift (TCM Doris Day Collection).

=== 1953 ===
Title	Major credits	Release date	Notes
Sporting Courage	Dick Durrance; music: William Lava; narrator: Art Gilmore	January 31	Profiles handicapped skiers in Austria
Birthplace of Hockey	Douglas Sinclair; music: William Lava; narrator: Art Gilmore	February 28	More Canadian winter sports
Cheyenne Days	David Goodnow; music: Howard Jackson & William Lava; narrator: Art Gilmore	April 4	Frontier Days Celebration in Wyoming
Yoho Wonder Valley	National Film Board of Canada; director: John Olsen & Roger Blais	May 9 (US, Canadian release in 1951)	rare black and white entry is a Canadian import, part of Warner’s “Canadian Cameo” series initially.
Ride a White Horse	producer: Cedric Francis; director: Owen Crump; music: Howard Jackson; narrator: Art Gilmore	July 25	Covers Nevada’s White Horse Ranch
Danish Sport Delights	producer: Cedric Francis; director: André de la Varre; music: William Lava; narrator: Art Gilmore	July 25	first in WarnerColor. Spotlighting a sailing regatta at Kolding (Denmark), bicycle racing at Aarhus and festivals in Ringsted and Sønderborg
Heart of a Champion	producer: Cedric Francis; director: Edwin E. Olsen & Joseph Burnham; music: Howard Jackson; narrator: Sam Balter	December 26	Trainer Tom Blackison aids an injured race horse to victory.

=== 1954 ===
Title	Major credits	Release date	Notes
Born to Ski	producer Cedric Francis; director: John Roberts & Clayton Ballou; music: Howard Jackson; narrator: Marvin Miller	January 16	Profile of Andrea Mead Lawrence
When Fish Fight	producer Cedric Francis; director: Alfred Glassel Jr.; music: Howard Jackson; narrator: Art Gilmore	February 20	Shot in New Zealand
Carnival in Rio	producer Cedric Francis; director: André de la Varre; story: Owen Crump; music: Howard Jackson; narrator: Art Gilmore	April 24	Festivals in Rio de Janeiro
Off to the Races!	producer Cedric Francis; director: Charles Tedford; music: William Lava; narrator: Art Gilmore	June 28	Compilation reel of past shorts (Greyhounds, soap box derby and the Palio horse race of Siena included)
G.I. Holiday	producer Cedric Francis; director: Dick Durrance; music: Howard Jackson; narrator: Art Gilmore	July 25	Shot in the Bavarian Alps
Circus on Ice	Associated Screen News of Canada; director: Gordon Sparling; narrator: Ken Davey	September	Initially released as a “Canadian Cameo”, covering the 40th annual of the Toronto Skating Club.
Royal Mounties	Douglas Sinclair; music: William Lava; narrator: Marvin Miller	September 19	Filmed in Ontario (1953)
Sea Sports of Tahiti	producer Cedric Francis; director: William Whitman; music: William Lava; narrator: Marvin Miller	October 24	Tahiti travelogue
Rodeo Roundup	producer Cedric Francis; Charles Tedford (director); music: William Lava; narrator: Art Gilmore	December 11	

=== 1955 ===
Title	Major credits	Release date	Notes
Silver Blades	producer Cedric Francis: director: André de la Varre; music: William Lava; narrator: Art Gilmore	January 15	Visiting the huge ski rink in Vienna, Austria
Caribbean Playgrounds	producer Cedric Francis; director: André de la Varre; music: Howard Jackson; narrator: Art Gilmore	February 18	Fishing, swimming and other sports in Puerto Rica, Jamaica and other areas.
Football Royal	producer Cedric Francis: director: André de la Varre; music: Howard Jackson; narrator: Marvin Miller	March 19	A 16th century ballgame is performed in Florence
Riviera Revalries	producer Cedric Francis: director: André de la Varre; story: Owen Crump; music: Howard Jackson	May 21	Tour of French Riviera
Italian Holiday	Hamilton Wright; music: Howard Jackson; narrator: Art Gilmore	July 9	
Aqua Queens	producer Cedric Francis: director: André de la Varre; music: Howard Jackson; narrator: Art Gilmore	August 6	Water skiing in Florida
Picturesque Portugal	James A. Fitzpatrick; narrator: Marvin Miller	October 15	Filmed in 1952 and edited between FitzPatrick’s move from MGM’s Traveltalks to Paramount (for his VistaVision series)

=== 1956 ===
Title	Major credits	Release date	Notes
Fish Are Where You Find Them	producer Cedric Francis: director: André de la Varre; music: Howard Jackson; narrator: Art Gilmore	January 14	Shots include Germany, Florida, the Andes and Austria
Green Gold	Hamilton Wright; story: Owen Crump; music: Howard Jackson	February 18	Tour of Ecuador.
Crashing the Water Barrier	co-producer: Robert Youngson; director: Konstantin Kaiser; narrator: Knox Manning	March 17	Donald Campbell strives to break 200 miles on Lake Mead, Nevada on November 16, 1955. Academy Award for Best Live Action Short Film
The Sporting Irish	producer Cedric Francis: director: André de la Varre; music: Howard Jackson; narrator: Marvin Miller	July 21	Horse races in Ireland

== See also ==
- List of short subjects by Hollywood studio § Warner Brothers
- Travelogue (films)
