= Technicolor Adventure =

The name “Technicolor Adventure” was used by Warner Bros. to define its one-reel (mostly 9–10 minutes in length) film shorts that were not part of the Sports Parade, also shot in Technicolor in the 1940s. Most were travelogues or human interest documentary films. Gordon Hollingshead produced most of them, with music scores provided by Howard Jackson.

List of films by title / major credits (not complete) / release date or copyright date (marked ©) / notes:

Title	Major credits	Release date	Notes
Fashions for Tomorrow	Paul R. Thoma (director); narrator: Knox Manning	November 17, 1945	
In Old Santa Fe	producers: A. Pam Blumenthal & Van Campen Heilner (producers); André de la Varre (director); narrator: Truman Bradley (actor);	January 12, 1946	covers Santa Fe, New Mexico festival in 1945
All Aboard	Carl Dudley (producer/director); narrator: Knox Manning	March 30, 1946	history of railroads
Girls and Flowers	André de la Varre (director); narrator: Knox Manning	May 25, 1946	visits Holland, Michigan and Cypress Gardens, Florida
Let's Go Camping	Frederick Richards (film editor); music: Rex Dunn	July 27, 1946	two girls camp at the Grand Canyon and Painted Desert (Arizona)
Adventures in South America	Lewis N. Cotlow (director); narrator: Knox Manning	August 10, 1946	visits Lake Titicaca, La Paz, Cuzco Region, Lima & Peruvian side of the Amazon forests; (© December 30, 1945)
Star Spangled City	Carl Dudley (producer/director); music: William Lava; narrator: Knox Manning	October 19, 1946	Washington D.C.
Rubber River	Sullivan C. Richardson (director); story: Charles Tedford; narrator: Truman Bradley (actor);	November 16, 1946	Nicaragua Coco River
Beautiful Bali	Deane H. Dickason (director)	© December 28, 1946	travelogue of Bali runs longer than the others (15 minutes)
Kingdom of the Wild	Carl Stearns Clancy; story: Charles Tedford; music: Rex Dunn; narrator: Knox Manning;	March 15, 1947	National Park wildlife
Circus Horse	Richard L. Bare (director); Alan Hale & Douglas Kennedy	June 28, 1947	mini-western drama
Glamour Town	Philip Tannura (director); narrator: Knox Manning	August 2, 1947	spring 1946 tour of Hollywood
Branding Irons	Wayne Davis (director); narrator: Gayne Whitman	August 16, 1947	King Ranch (Texas) and other ranch locales
Land of Romance	Luis Osorno Barona (director); music: Rex Dunn	September 6, 1947	southern Mexico
Dad Minds the Baby	Robert B. Churchill & Richard L. Bare (directors); music: William Lava	December 20, 1947	comedy about infants; (filmed October 1946)
What's Hatchin'?	Alan Wilder (director); narrator: Art Gilmore	February 28, 1948	poultry farms in Long Island
Rhythm of a Big City	Carl Dudley (producer/director); music: William Lava; narrator: Marvin Miller	March 27, 1948	New York City tour
Living With Lions	S.R. Cleland Scott (director); narrator: Knox Manning	June 5, 1948	
Mysterious Ceylon	Charles Tedford (director); music: William Lava; narrator: Truman Bradley (actor)	September 25, 1948	
Jungle Man Killers	Charles Tedford (director); music: William Lava; narrator: Art Gilmore	November 6, 1948	a tiger hunt in Hyderabad
Bannister's Bantering Babies	Constance Bannister; music: William Lava; narrator: Art Gilmore	December 4, 1948	photographer profile
Circus Town	Gill DeWitt & Saul Elkins (directors); music: William Lava; narrator: Knox Manning	January 15, 1949	filmed in Gainesville, Texas
Camera Angles	Gene Lester (director); narrator: Art Gilmore	© December 15, 1948	magazine cover photography with cameos by Barbara Bates, Jack Carson, Sonia Henie, Hedy Lamarr & Alexis Smith; (Completed October 1947)
Treachery Rides the Trail	Charles Moore (director); narrator: Art Gilmore	March 19, 1949	juvenile melodrama
Spring Comes to Niagara	Gordon Sparling (director); narrator: Lamont Tilden	June 18, 1949	Niagara Falls

== See also ==
- List of short subjects by Hollywood studio § Warner Brothers
- Travelogue (films)
