= Scope Gem =

Scope Gem was a marketing series title that Warner Brothers used for documentary film shorts produced in Warnercolor and the wide-screen CinemaScope format. Most of these were travelogues.

== Overview ==
Warner Brothers favored block-booking these one- and two-reel documentaries with their wide-screen features. The first official title of the series, Sportsman’s Holiday was released with the CinemaScope feature Battle Cry.

Carl Dudley, who contributed to several of these, also independently produced some in Vistarama (which used 16mm instead of 35mm size, perfected by cameraman Edwin Olsen) for Warner distribution just prior to the official inauguration of the Scope Gem series in 1954–1955. Many of these were processed in Warnercolor.

Narration was handled by longtime veterans Art Gilmore and Marvin Miller, accompanied by the full orchestra scores of Howard Jackson and William Lava. Cedric Francis produced those not handled by Carl Dudley.

Although Universal Pictures, Columbia Pictures and especially 20th Century Fox also released many more shorts in CinemaScope between 1953 and 1964, the Warner product received some of the highest praise in the periodicals of the time. One title by André de la Varre, Time Stood Still, was nominated for an Academy Award. As BoxOffice magazine's reviewer stated on January 8, 1958, of Alpine Glory: "While the Austrian Alps have been filmed before, and well done too, this short subject in color is so beautiful and breathtaking that it can well be the best film ever to deal with the subject". Although seldom shown on TV on account of their frame format and never released on video, they were nonetheless successfully re-released to theaters through 1967, prompting a young Leonard Maltin to write in similar vocabulary in his The Great Movie Shorts (1972) "These are among the most breathtaking travelogues of all time".

Unfortunately Warner sharply curtailed feature films using wide-screen formats in 1957, using Technirama for only the most expensive productions. The studio's declining interest in CinemaScope, along with the shrinking market for short films, prompted an abrupt end to the series. During this same period, the concurrently released Joe McDoakes, Robert Youngson documentaries, Looney Tune and Merrie Melodie animated cartoons were released in the more standardized ratio but were equally successful at the box office.

The top cameraman of the series, André de la Varre, left Warner to rejoin the Burton Holmes company that same year, but did supply an occasional travelogue for the studio in the 1960s under its World Wide Adventures logo.

== List of titles ==
Title	Major credits	Running time	Release date	Notes
Aloha Nui	Carl Dudley (producer)	11 minutes	September 19, 1953	“Stereophonic Special” filmed in Hawaii
Below the Rio Grande	Carl Dudley (producer)	9 minutes	April 1, 1954	“Stereophonic Special” filmed in Mexico
Coney Island Holiday	Carl Dudley (producer); narrator: Art Gilmore	9 minutes	April 1, 1954	“Stereophonic Special” filmed in New York City
Valley of the Sun	Carl Dudley (producer); Richard Goldstone (director); narrator: Art Gilmore	17 minutes	July 3, 1954	“Stereophonic Special” filmed in Arizona and New Mexico
Sportsman's Holiday	Carl Dudley (producer); narrator: Art Gilmore	10 minutes	February 2, 1955	first official “Scope Gem” shot in Flagstaff, Arizona, and race tracks at Churchill Downs, Hollywood Park Racetrack, Epsom Downs and Belmont Park
Heart of an Empire	Carl Dudley (producer); script: Owen Crump; narrator: Marvin Miller	9 minutes	September 1, 1955	London
Journey to the Sea	Carl Dudley (producer); script: Owen Crump; narrator: Marvin Miller	16 minutes	September 1, 1955	Rhine River in France and Europe
Ski Valley	André de la Varre (director); narrator: Art Gilmore	9 minutes	September 1, 1955	Sun Valley, Idaho
Springtime in Holland	André de la Varre (director); story: Owen Crump; narrator: Marvin Miller	9 minutes	December 10, 1955	Netherlands
Hero On Horseback	Carl Dudley (producer): Richard Goldstone (director); narrator: Marvin Miller	17 minutes	April 7, 1956	portrait of Kemal Atatürk with modern-day Turkey footage
Time Stood Still	André de la Varre (director); story: Owen Crump; narrator: Marvin Miller	9 minutes	April 21, 1956	Dinkelsbühl
Italian Memories	André de la Varre (director); story: Owen Crump; narrator: Marvin Miller	17 minutes	June 9, 1956	
Thunder Beach	Jack Glenn (director); narrator: Joe King	9 minutes	June 23, 1956	Daytona Beach Road Course
Viva! Cuba	Carl Dudley (producer); narrator: Art Gilmore	9 minutes	August 25, 1956	mostly Cuba
Crossroads of the World	André de la Varre (director); story: Owen Crump; narrator: Marvin Miller	9 minutes	September 26, 1956	Singapore
East Is East	André de la Varre (director); script: Owen Crump; narrator: Marvin Miller	17 minutes	September 26, 1956	Malay, Burma and Thailand
South of the Himalayas	André de la Varre (director); script: Owen Crump; narrator: Marvin Miller	18 minutes	October 6, 1956	India
Magic in the Sun	Carl Dudley (producer); narrator: Howard Culver	8 minutes	November 6, 1956	Haiti
The Legend of El Dorado	Tom McGowan (director); narrator: Marvin Miller	18 minutes	December 29, 1956	Colombia
Under Carib Skies	Carl Dudley (producer); script: Owen Crump; narrator: Howard Culver	9 minutes	February 16, 1957	mostly Jamaica
Tales of the Black Forest	André de la Varre (director); script: Owen Crump; narrator: Marvin Miller	18 minutes	June 1, 1957	Germany
The Blue Danube	André de la Varre (director); script: Owen Crump; narrator: Marvin Miller	17 minutes	June 1, 1957	Austria & Germany
Alpine Glory	André de la Varre (director); script: Owen Crump (writer); narrator: Marvin Miller	9 minutes	August 3, 1957	Austria

== See also ==
- André de la Varre
- Carl Dudley
- List of short subjects by Hollywood studio#Warner Brothers
- Travelogue (films)
