= LaVarre =

LaVarre is a surname. Notable people with the surname include:

- André de la Varre (1904–1987), American filmmaker, brother of William LaVarre and John Merton
- Mark LaVarre (born 1965), American ice hockey player
- William LaVarre (1898–1991), American geographer, explorer and journalist, brother of André de la Varre and John Merton
- John Merton (born Myrtland F. LaVarre; 1901–1959), American actor, brother of André de la Varre and William LaVarre
