= A Boy and His Dog (1946 film) =

1946 film

- Directed by: LeRoy Prinz
- Screenplay by: Saul Elkins
- Based on: original story by Samuel A. Derieux
- Produced by: Gordon Hollingshead
- Starring: Harry Davenport; Billy Sheffield; Dorothy Adams
- Cinematography: Charles Boyle, A.S.C.
- Edited by: Marshall Eyanson
- Music by: William Lava
- Distributed by: Warner Bros. Pictures, Inc.
- Release date: December 26, 1946
- Running time: 21 minutes
- Country: United States
- Language: English

A Boy and His Dog is a 1946 American Technicolor short drama film directed by LeRoy Prinz. It won an Oscar at the 19th Academy Awards in 1947 for Best Short Subject (Two-Reel).

Short-story author Samuel A. Derieux, who died twenty-four years earlier in 1922, received story credit for the short film, suggesting to some the expectation that he wrote a work with the title "A Boy and His Dog". However, a plot summary for the short film, attributed to David Glagovsky, closely parallels Derieux's short story "The Trial in Tom Belcher's Store", suggesting the film-makers drew on the published (and once celebrated) story, but gave the short film a title Derieux need not ever have considered.

It is entirely unrelated to Harlan Ellison's 1969 novella cycle as well as its 1975 film adaptation of the same name.

== Cast ==
- Harry Davenport as Squire Jim Kirby
- Billy Sheffield as Davy Allen
- Dorothy Adams as Mrs. Allen
- Russell Simpson as Mr. Thornycroft
- Eddie Waller as Sheriff
- and Fleeta as Buck [a Bluetick Coonhound]

Unbilled

- Truman Bradley (narrator)
- Heinie Conklin (townsman at meeting)
- Jack Mower (Tom Belcher, store owner)
