= George Crump =

George Crump may refer to:

- George Arthur Crump (1871–1918), hotelier and golf course architect
- George J. Crump (1841–1928), army officer, lawyer and state legislator
- George Crump (American football) (born 1959), American football defensive end
- George William Crump (1786–1848), U.S. Representative from Virginia
