= Time Stood Still (film) =

- Directed by: André de la Varre
- Written by: Owen Crump
- Produced by: Cedric Francis
- Narrated by: Marvin Miller
- Cinematography: André de la Varre
- Music by: Howard Jackson
- Distributed by: Warner Bros.
- Release date: April 21, 1956
- Country: United States
- Language: English

Time Stood Still is a 1956 Warner Brothers Scope Gem travelogue, filmed the previous year in Dinkelsbühl, and presented in the wide-screen format of CinemaScope. Filmmaker André de la Varre handled a great many of that studio's documentary shorts of the forties and fifties.

It was nominated for an Academy Award for Best Live Action Short Film at the 29th Academy Awards.
