= Grandad of Races =

1950 film

- Directed by: André de la Varre
- Written by: Charles L. Tedford
- Produced by: Gordon Hollingshead
- Starring: Art Gilmore
- Cinematography: André de la Varre
- Edited by: Rex Steele
- Distributed by: Warner Bros.
- Release date: September 2, 1950
- Country: United States
- Language: English

Grandad of Races is a 1950 American short documentary film about the Palio di Siena held in the Piazza del Campo in Siena, directed by André de la Varre. It won an Oscar at the 23rd Academy Awards in 1951 for Best Short Subject (One-Reel).

== Cast ==
- Art Gilmore as Narrator
