= Portrait of a Genius =

1943 short subject motion picture

- Directed by: Sammy Lee
- Written by: Carl Dudley
- Cinematography: Charles Schoenbaum
- Edited by: Adrienne Fazan
- Music by: Max Terr; Nathaniel Shilkret
- Production company: Metro-Goldwyn-Mayer
- Distributed by: FIlms Incorporated
- Release date: January 23, 1943
- Running time: 9:00
- Country: United States
- Language: English

Portrait of a Genius (originally Carey Wilson Miniatures: Portrait of a Genius) is a 1943 short subject film directed by Sammy Lee.

== Plot ==
It is a study of various inventions of Leonardo da Vinci that were found in his secret manuscripts after his death. These included early versions of Gatling and machine guns, submarines, tanks, and other weapons. He also imagined a telescope, a type of parachute, and a flying machine, among many other things.

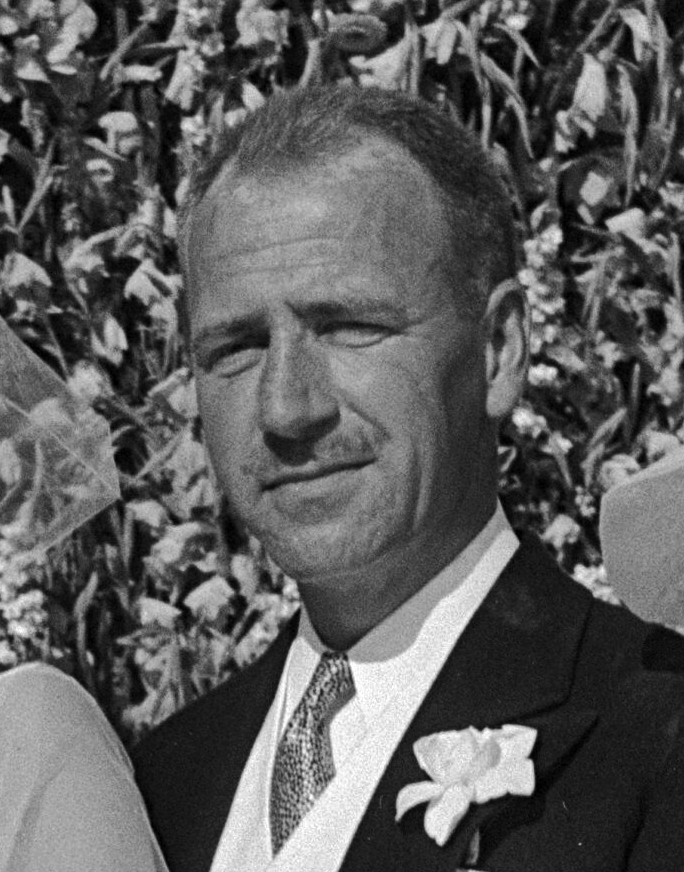
Carey Wilson, narrator who conceived the series

== Cast (alphabetically) ==
- Richard Ainley as Leonardo da Vinci
- Tom Stevenson (uncredited) as Valet
- Carey Wilson as narrator
- Frederick Worlock (uncredited) as Count Spurzo
