= Saul Elkins =

American film producer

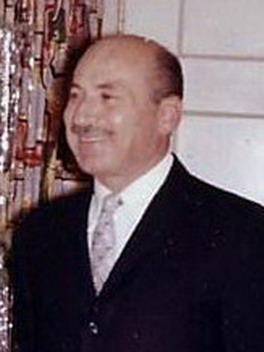
- Born: June 29, 1907; New York, New York, US
- Died: May 9, 2001 (aged 93); Henderson, Nevada, US
- Occupations: Writer, producer, director
- Spouse: Marguerite Elkins (Murphy)
- Relatives: Leon Elkins (brother); Michael Elkins (brother)

Saul Elkins (June 29, 1907 in New York, New York – May 9, 2001 in Henderson, Nevada) was an American writer, producer and director in the film industry.

Saul was the eldest of three sons of East European Jewish immigrant tailors. He was the brother of BBC, Newsweek and CBS journalist/broadcaster Michael Elkins. He directed 11 short films between 1944 and 1949, produced 14 movies between 1948 and 1951 and wrote the screenplay for 24 films between 1936 and 1950.

== Filmography ==
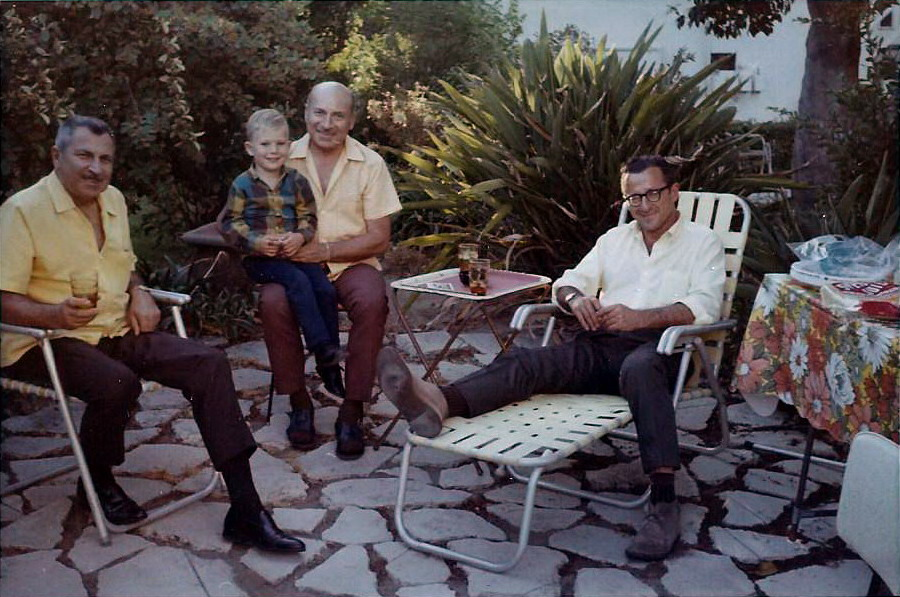
Family photo of Saul with his two brothers. Left to right, the adults are: Leon Elkins, Saul Elkins and Michael Elkins. Seated on Saul's knee is his great nephew, Leon's grandson.

Date	Title	Role	Series	Film	Notes
1936	The Crime of Dr. Forbes	Writer	—N/a	Feat.	Original screenplay
1936	Charlie Chan at the Race Track	Writer	—N/a	Feat.	From a story by
1936	Star for a Night	Writer	—N/a	Feat.	
1936	Under Your Spell	Writer	—N/a	Feat.	Screenplay
1937	That I May Live	Writer	—N/a	Feat.	Contract writer [uncredited]
1938	Women in Prison	Writer	—N/a	Feat.	Screenplay
1938	Tarnished Angel	Writer	—N/a	Feat.	Adaptation/story
1939	Off the Record	Writer	—N/a	Feat.	Original story
1939	Pride of the Navy	Writer	—N/a	Feat.	Screenplay
1940	Spills for Thrills	Writer	Broadway Brevities	Short	Script [uncredited]
1943	Good Old Corn	Writer	Broadway Brevities	Short	
1944	Our Frontier in Italy	Director	Broadway Brevities	Short	
1945	America the Beautiful	Writer	Technicolor Specials	Short	
1945	Star in the Night	Writer	Broadway Brevities	Short	Screenplay
1945	Story of a Dog	Writer	Vitaphone Varieties	Short	Narration
1945	Hitler Lives	Writer	Broadway Brevities	Short	
1945	Hawaiian Memories	Writer	Technicolor Specials	Short	
1946	Smart as a Fox	Writer	Vitaphone Varieties	Short	Narration
1946	Beach Days	Writer	Sports Parade	Short	
1946	Men of Tomorrow	Director	Technicolor Specials	Short	
1946	All Aboard	Writer	Technicolor Adventure	Short	
1946	A Boy and His Dog	Writer	Technicolor Special	Short	Screenplay
1947	Battle of the Champs	Writer	Sports Parade	Short	Narration
1947	Vaudeville Revue	Director	Melody Masters	Short	
1947	Tennis Town	Director	Sports Parade	Short	
1947	A Day at the Fair	Director	Technicolor Special	Short	
1947	King of the Carnival	Director	Technicolor Special	Short	
1947	Power Behind the Nation	Writer	Technicolor Special	Short	
1947	Soap Box Derby	Director	Technicolor Special	Short	
1948	Celebration Days	Director	Technicolor Special	Short	
1948	Fighting Athletes	Director	Sports Parade	Short	
1948	Calgary Stampede	Director	Technicolor Special	Short	
1948	The Big Punch	Producer	—N/a	Feat.	
1948	Embraceable You	Producer	—N/a	Feat.	
1948	Smart Girls Don't Talk	Producer	—N/a	Feat.	
1949	Circus Town	Writer	Technicolor Adventure	Short	
1949	Flaxy Martin	Producer	—N/a	Feat.	
1949	Homicide	Producer	—N/a	Feat.	
1949	The Younger Brothers	Producer	—N/a	Feat.	
1949	One Last Fling	Producer	—N/a	Feat.	
1949	Water Wizards	Director	Sports Parade	Short	
1949	The House Across the Street	Producer	—N/a	Feat.	
1950	The Grass Is Always Greener	Writer	Broadway Brevities	Short	Screenplay
1950	Barricade	Producer	—N/a	Feat.	
1950	Colt .45	Producer	—N/a	Feat.	
1950	This Side of The Law	Producer	—N/a	Feat.	
1950	Return of the Frontiersman	Producer	—N/a	Feat.	
1951	Ratón Pass	Producer	—N/a	Feat.	
1951	Sugarfoot	Producer	—N/a	Feat.	
