= World Wide Adventures =

World Wide Adventures is a generalized name applied to Warner Bros. live-action short films of the 1960s. Usually, the trade magazines like BoxOffice only listed the one-reelers (running about 10 minutes in length) under this heading, with the longer films simply dubbed “specials.” For the most part, this was a handy marketing logo for a wide range of shorts of the documentary genre.

== Overview ==
Although the studio sharply curtailed theatrical “live-action” shorts production by 1957, a selective number of featurettes and independent films were distributed along with the Looney Tunes and Merrie Melodies animated cartoons as material shown before the main feature. By this time it was more profitable to re-release older films rather than make new ones, but theater owners expected a few “new” offerings each year. (At least one of their rivals, Universal Pictures, continued a consistent schedule of both live-action and animated short subjects through 1972.)

While the bulk were independent travelogues, the in-house producers Cedric Francis and William L. Hendricks (famous for the final cartoons featuring Daffy Duck and Cool Cat) supervised a few themselves.

Despite being largely forgotten over the decades, a handful have enjoyed a second life as “extras” between main features on Turner Classic Movies, particularly such titles as Kingdom of the Saguenay and See Holland Before It Gets Too Big.

== List of titles ==
Since the live-action short subjects made during this period seldom received proper coverage in periodicals and reference books, this chronological listing is incomplete in its information:

=== Marketed as "World Wide Adventures" or "Specials" ===
Title	Major credits	Running time	Release date	Filming location / notes
A Touch of Gold	Hamilton Wright	9 minutes	October 1962	South Africa
Fabulous Mexico	Hamilton Wright	9 minutes	October 1962	Mexico
Moroccan Rivieras	Hamilton Wright (producer); Richard Wright (director)	9 minutes	February 1963	Morocco
Wish and Ticino	André de la Varre	9 minutes	September 21, 1963	Switzerland
A Look at Log Island	(Crest Productions)	9 minutes	October 1963	Stockholm, Sweden
With Their Eyes on the Stars	Cedric Francis (producer); music: John Stewart & the Ridgerunners	17 minutes	February 1, 1964	documentary on US history (for North American Aviation)
Kingdom of the Saguenay	Douglas Sinclair	9 minutes	February 1, 1964	Québec
Report from San Juan	(Delta Film International); David Ahlers (producer)	17 minutes	August 8, 1964	Puerto Rico
Cheyenne Autumn Trail	(Professional Film Services); Ronald Saland (director); Burt Sloane (writer); Ross Lowell (camera); Howard Kuperman (editor)	18 minutes	October 1964	partly a promotional for Cheyenne Autumn
Metropolis in Miniature	(J & F Productions)	9 minutes	1964 (independent release); September 1965 (Warner release)	Hershey, Pennsylvania
A Free People	William L. Hendricks (producer)	20 minutes	March 1965	Various locations in the US, for the US Army
A Country Reborn		9 minutes	October 1965	Taiwan
The Land We Love	William L. Hendricks (producer); Raymond Massey & Hubert Humphrey (narrator/hosts)	18 minutes	February 1966	Made for U.S. savings bonds
Bolivia- The Last Frontier	Hamilton Wright (producer); narrator: Andre Baruch	18 minutes	August 1966	Bolivia
Hollywood Star-Spangled Revue	William L. Hendricks (producer)	10 minutes	September 17, 1966	Hollywood, made for U.S. savings bonds with Bob Hope, Phyllis Diller, James Stewart, Herb Alpert, the Rockettes, Carlyn Jones & Joanie Sommers
The Fastest Automobile in the World		9 minutes	November 5, 1966	Bob and Bill Summers (car builder) testing the Goldenrod (car) in Bonneville Salt Flats
Where in the World?	Hamilton Wright (producer)	10 minutes	November 30, 1966	
Precision	(National Film Board of Canada); George Dufaux	10 minutes	1966 (Canada); December 30, 1967 (Warner release)	
Holiday Afloat		10 minutes	February 15?, 1967	
Motion (Man In Motion / La Mouvement)			April 1967 (Expo 67); February 1, 1969 (Warner release)	
Sky Over Holland (Ciels de Haollande)	John Fernhout	22 minutes	May 1967 (Cannes Film Festival); April 30, 1968 (Warner release)	70mm views of Netherlands
33 Fathoms Deep (33 Fathoms Plus)	Robert J. Ellsworth	17 minutes	July 1967 (independent release); February 12, 1968 (Warner release)	Bob Croft and others diving in Florida
Le Pecheur a l'Ecoute (Fisherman's Fall)	(National Film Board of Canada); Robert Nichol (director)	16 minutes	1967 (Canada release); November 23, 1968 (Warner release)	
Claybirds Are Coming	Hamilton Wright (producer)	9 minutes	February 21, 1968	
Newfoundland's Fighting Fish		16 minutes	March 2, 1968	Canadian import
Rolling Down the Rhine	(Crest Productions)	9 minutes	March 23, 1968	Switzerland, Austria & Germany
Tower	(Seneca Productions / Allied Chemical Corporation)	9 minutes	April 27, 1968	
Sea and Ski (From Sea to Ski)		18 minutes	November 2, 1968	
Big John	Art Mayer	9 minutes	February 8, 1969	
See Holland Before It Gets Too Big	(Netherlands National Tourist Office); Norman Weissman (director); Robert Klinkert (camera); Dan Barrie (music)	11 minutes	April 5, 1969	Netherlands
Upwind Down Under	Art Mayer	9 minutes	April 12, 1969	sailing off Sydney, Australia
Season In Tyrol	William L. Hendricks (producer); Kurt Jetmar (director); Efrem Zimbalist Jr. (narrator)	19 minutes	June 14, 1969	Austria
Freedom Road	(Mattco Associates)	17 minutes	July 5, 1969	
Harry, Come Sail with Me	Hamilton Wright (producer)	10 minutes	August 23, 1969	
Annabel Lee: Story by Edgar Allan Poe	Ron Morante; Vincent Price (narrator)	10 minutes	November 22, 1969	
The Lemmings	Mark Obenhaus	10 minutes	November 22, 1969	
One Giant Leap	(North America Rockwell Corporation and NASA); narrator: Gordon MacRae	18 minutes	March 28, 1970	profiles Apollo 11
A Walk Through the Sounds of Switzerland	(Swiss National Tourist Office); André de la Varre Jr. (director)	9 minutes	July 1, 1970	Switzerland

=== Assorted later shorts distributed by Warner Bros. ===
Title	Major credits	Running time	Release date	Filming location / notes
The Karmon-Israeli Dancers And Theodore Bikel	(Zavala-Riss Productions)	25 minutes	January 1972	filmed 1970
Jungle Habitat		9 minutes	March 19, 1973	profiles a theme park
An American Partnership	William L. Hendricks (producer); narrator: William Conrad	13 minutes	1974	Made for U.S. savings bonds
Free Enterprise	William L. Hendricks (producer); Hal Greer; narrator: Efrem Zimbalist Jr.	15 minutes	1975	

== See also ==
- List of short subjects by Hollywood studio#Warner Brothers
- Travelogue (films)
