= Millionaires in Prison =

- Theatrical release poster
- Directed by: Ray McCarey
- Screenplay by: Lynn Root; Frank Fenton
- Story by: Martin Mooney
- Produced by: Howard Benedict
- Starring: Lee Tracy; Linda Hayes; Raymond Walburn; Morgan Conway; Truman Bradley
- Cinematography: Harry J. Wild
- Edited by: Theron Warth
- Music by: Roy Webb
- Production company: RKO Pictures
- Distributed by: RKO Pictures
- Release date: July 12, 1940
- Running time: 64 minutes
- Country: United States
- Language: English

Millionaires in Prison is a 1940 American crime drama film directed by Ray McCarey and written by Lynn Root and Frank Fenton. The film stars Lee Tracy, Linda Hayes, Raymond Walburn, Morgan Conway and Truman Bradley. The film was released on July 12, 1940, by RKO Pictures.

== Plot ==
Nick Burton is a convict who wields considerable influence among others behind bars. He befriends the prison doctor, Bill Collins, who is seeking a cure for a deadly virus (referred to as 'Malta fever' during the film) and needs guinea pigs for his experimental drugs. A wealthy physician sentenced for reckless driving, Harry Lindsay, is persuaded to be of help. Malta Fever is more commonly known as Brucellosis, which is a highly contagious zoonotic virus and no cure for it has ever been found.

Burton looks up two other rich inmates, Bruce Vander and Harold Kellogg, jailed for income tax evasion. They scheme to raise money for Collins' medical experiments. A pair of millionaire con men, James Brent and Sidney Keats, attempt a stock swindle even while behind bars, but Burton takes it upon himself to thwart their plans. The experiments produce a miracle cure for the virus, whereupon Burton and the doctor are both granted an early parole.

== Cast ==
- Lee Tracy as Nick Burton
- Linda Hayes as Helen Hewitt
- Raymond Walburn as Bruce Vander
- Morgan Conway as James Brent
- Truman Bradley as Dr. William 'Bill' Collins
- Virginia Vale as May Thomas
- Cliff Edwards as Happy
- Paul Guilfoyle as Ox
- Thurston Hall as Harold Kellogg
- Chester Clute as Sidney Keats
- Shemp Howard as Professor
- Horace McMahon as Sylvester Odgen 'SOS' Schofield
- Thomas E. Jackson as Warden Tom Hammond
- Elliott Sullivan as Tony Brody
- Selmer Jackson as Dr. Harry Lindsay
- Vinton Hayworth as 'Windy' Windsor
- Robert Clarke as Priest
- Dell Henderson as Dell (uncredited)
