= Paul Redfern =

American teacher and aviator (1902–1927)

- Born: Paul Rinaldo Redfern; February 24, 1902; Rochester, New York, U.S.
- Disappeared: August 26, 1927; Inland over Venezuela
- Status: Missing, presumed dead
- Occupations: Musician, pilot
- Known for: First person to fly solo across the Caribbean Sea and first to fly nonstop from North to South America; mysterious disappearance

Paul Redfern (24 February 1902 – August 1927?) was an American musician and pilot. In August 1927, Redfern became the first person to fly solo across the Caribbean Sea and the first to fly nonstop from North to South America He has never been found or heard from since he was observed flying inland over Venezuela. Redfern's flight was twelve weeks after Charles Lindbergh made his historic flight from New York to Paris. In 1929, Lindbergh came close to skimming the sands of the Sea Island, Georgia, beach Redfern took off from and dropped carnations in his fellow flyer's honor. If Redfern had reached his final destination, Rio de Janeiro, Brazil, his 4,600-mile (4,000 nmi; 7,400 km) flight would have outdistanced Lindbergh. Redfern had an alternative landing site (Recife) planned if his fuel ran too low, but it is unknown whether he pursued that alternative or decided to continue on to Rio, where thousands awaited his arrival, including the President of Brazil and movie star Clara Bow.

== Biography ==
Paul Rinaldo Redfern was born in 1902 to Blanche Myrtle Redfern and Dr. Frederick Coachefer Redfern in Rochester, New York. His uncles were Richard S. Redfern and Edwin C. Redfern. As a teenager, Paul lived in Columbia, South Carolina, where his father was a dean at Benedict College and an advocate for black rights who advised Franklin Delano Roosevelt on poverty in the South. His mother taught English at Benedict and represented South Carolina as a delegate at national political conventions. Paul was a mechanical and musical prodigy. He was planning to go to MIT, but after building several planes, he was asked by the U.S. government at age 16 to go to New Jersey to be a production inspector for the Army Air Corps at the Standard Aircraft Corporation. Upon returning to South Carolina, he became a barnstormer at air shows and started the first airport in Columbia, South Carolina. He married Gertrude Hildebrand in Toledo, Ohio, in 1925.

== Flight and disappearance ==
In August 1927, Redfern attempted to fly from Brunswick, Georgia, to Brazil in a Stinson SM-1 Detroiter NX-773 nicknamed the Port of Brunswick. He was spotted by the Norwegian freighter Christian Krogh a few hundred miles off the coast of South America, after dropping a message asking for the ship to be turned in the direction of the nearest land, and when nearing Venezuela he was spotted by a fisherman just off the coast and then later by others in towns and outposts in Venezuela. He failed to arrive in Rio de Janeiro, and over the years more than a dozen search parties were organized. Missionaries and people visiting tribes living in the jungle reported on a white man living among the Indians, but he was never found, and no credible evidence documenting that he somehow survived the flight exists.

In September 1927, George Henry Hamilton Tate, sponsored by the American Museum of Natural History, went to look for Redfern. Some believed him to still be alive as late as 1932.

In 1935, William LaVarre who was searching for diamonds in the interior of Suriname heard a story in Drietabbetje about a crippled white man who had fallen from the sky, and was now living with the Amerindians in Paloemeu. The American consulate sent an expedition to the village, but found nothing.

In 1936, aviator Art Williams claimed he found traces of the Redfern crash in British Guiana. In the same month, newspaper articles appeared that Redfern was living in a little Amerindian village not listed on any map in the Tumuk Humak Mountains of British Guiana. He was married and had a son, however the Amerindians did not want to part with him. Redfern's father published a joyful reply in the papers, and credited Art Williams as the discoverer of his son. Williams who did not originate the story, discovered that Alfred Harred, a freelance reporter in Suriname, was the origin, and took him to court in Paramaribo where Harred admitted that the story was false and that he had been paid to spread the falsehood.

In 1937, the 13th expedition was organized to find out his fate. Now missing for ten years, he could be legally declared dead. In February 1938 Frederick John Fox died while trying to find Redfern. In April 1938 Theodore J. Waldeck believed he found the wreckage of Redfern's plane.

His father died in 1941, still hoping that his son would be found alive. His widow, Gertrude Hillabrand, died in 1981 and was buried in Detroit, Michigan.

In 1988 Robert Carlin believed that Redfern had flown over Ciudad Bolivar, Venezuela, only to be killed in a crash in the jungle and that a report that aviator Jimmy Angel had seen wreckage of Redfern's plane was not bragging, but correct. Carlin believed the area to be approximately 40 miles NNW of Angel Falls.

On the 25th of August each year, the Paul Rinaldo Redfern Aviation Society meets in Columbia, South Carolina. At 12.46p.m, the same time that Redfern took off on his last flight, the Society raises a toast in his honour.

== See also ==
- List of people who disappeared mysteriously: 1910–1990
