= The Narcotics Story =

1958 film

- Directed by: Robert W. Larsen
- Written by: Roger Emerson Garris
- Produced by: Robert W. Larsen
- Starring: See below
- Cinematography: Jerry May
- Edited by: Charles Henkel Jr.; Robert W. Larsen
- Music by: Alexander Laszlo
- Release date: 1958
- Running time: 75 minutes
- Country: United States
- Language: English

The Narcotics Story is a 1958 American film directed by Robert W. Larsen.

The film is also known as Goofballs and Tea (American informal short title).

== Plot summary ==
This police training film uses dramatizations of real life events to demonstrate the battle law enforcement faces with narcotics, most specifically barbiturates - also known as "goof balls" - and marijuana - also known as "tea". It shows how to identify certain narcotics, identify the signs that someone is using, identify the signs of where drug deals take place, identify the signs of use in a secluded public place, and apprehend the users in these public settings. As it follows one young woman neglected by her parents, the film also shows the underlying causes of narcotics use, with these underlying causes often the forgotten issue as everyone tends to deal with the symptoms.

== Cast ==
- Art Gilmore as Narrator (voice)

Herbert Crisp, Officer Joe Delro, Darlene Hendricks, Bob Hopkins, Douglas Kester, Patricia Lynn, Fred Marratto, John Murphy, Allen Pitt, Sharon Strand and Nan Terry also appear.
