= Thomas Horner Owen =

Thomas H. Owen
- Born: Thomas Horner Owen; February 24, 1873; Newton County, Arkansas (near Jasper)
- Died: September 19, 1938 (aged 65); Oklahoma City, Oklahoma
- Other names: T. H. Owen, Thomas H. Owen
- Occupations: Attorney, judge
- Known for: Served on Oklahoma Supreme Court

Thomas Horner Owen (February 24, 1873 – September 19, 1938) was a judge of the Oklahoma Supreme Court. Born and raised in Arkansas, he moved to Indian Territory in 1894. According to Victor Harlow's version of Owen's biography, Owen was born near Jasper, Arkansas on February 24, 1873. (Note: As described in the next paragraph, he may have received his education in the law by working with an established lawyer in Arkansas before moving out of the state.)

Chronicles of Oklahoma reports that Thomas Horner Owen studied law with W. M. Crump (William Jackson Crump was later a judge in Muskogee, but then located in Harrison, Arkansas). (Note: Cited by a document on Geni. The original article appeared in Chronicles of Oklahoma.) His sister Dora Owen married Crump, and Owen Crump was one of their children.

== Career in Oklahoma ==
After becoming a member of the bar, Owen began practicing in the small communities of Vian and Muldrow, before moving to Muskogee, Oklahoma in 1896. In 1901, he joined the law firm of Soper & Huckleberry in Muskogee and after statehood, served as political manager for Charles Haskell, who was seeking election as the first governor of the state. Plunging into local politics, he became Muskogee's City Attorney in 1901 and 1902. In 1910, he was named Judge of the Court of Criminal Appeals, and Muskogee County Attorney from 1911 to 1912. After that term expired, he returned to private practice from 1912 to 1917. In 1912, Owen was a delegate to the Democratic National Convention in Baltimore, supporting Woodrow Wilson as the party's presidential candidate. He also served as Assistant Secretary for the Democratic National Committee (DNC) in the party headquarters. (Note: He declined Wilson's offer to appoint him as Ambassador to Japan.) Then he returned to his private law practice.

Owen was appointed Associate Justice on the Oklahoma Supreme Court by Governor Robert L. Williams, serving from 1917 to 1919. From 1920 to 1921, he served as Chief Justice, then resigned.

When Oklahoma City Mayor Jack Walton announced that he would run for the Democratic nomination in 1922, Conservative Democrats opposed to him announced their support for Judge Thomas H. Owen. Robert H. Wilson, state superintendent of education and allegedly supported by the Ku Klux Klan also campaigned for the Democratic nomination. The split in the Democratic ranks gave an edge to Walton for the nomination. The Conservative Democrats then supported the Republican candidate John H. Fields, who lost to Walton in the general election.

Running for governor was his final run for office. He then became trustee of the American National Bank until 1926, then resumed private law practice.

== Personal ==
Owen married his first wife, Beulah Davis, in Muskogee on September 14, 1898. (Note: Beulah died on December 11, 1907. He married a second time in 1916, to Louise Hall Parker, the daughter of a pioneer cattleman from Vinita, Oklahoma. This couple had a son and a daughter.)

He died from a blood infection in Oklahoma City on September 19, 1938.
