= William Jackson Crump =

Arkansas politician (1865–1957)

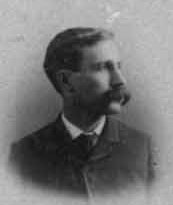
- Crump, 1893

Arkansas House of Representatives for Newton County, Arkansas
- In office 1893–1894

Personal details
- Born: September 22, 1865 Quincy, Hickory County, Missouri, U.S.
- Died: February 10, 1957 (aged 91) Houston, Harris County, Texas, U.S.
- Resting place: Greenhill Cemetery, Muskogee, Oklahoma, U.S.
- Party: Democrat
- Spouse: Dora Owen (m. 1891)
- Relations: George J. Crump (uncle), Thomas Horner Owen (brother in-law)
- Children: 4, including Owen Crump
- Occupation: Politician, lawyer, judge
- Nickname: W. J. Crump

William Jackson Crump (1865–1957) was an American politician, lawyer, and judge. He served in the Arkansas House of Representatives in 1893, and represented Newton County, Arkansas. Crump also practiced law in Oklahoma. He also went by the name W. J. Crump. He was a Democrat.

== Biography ==
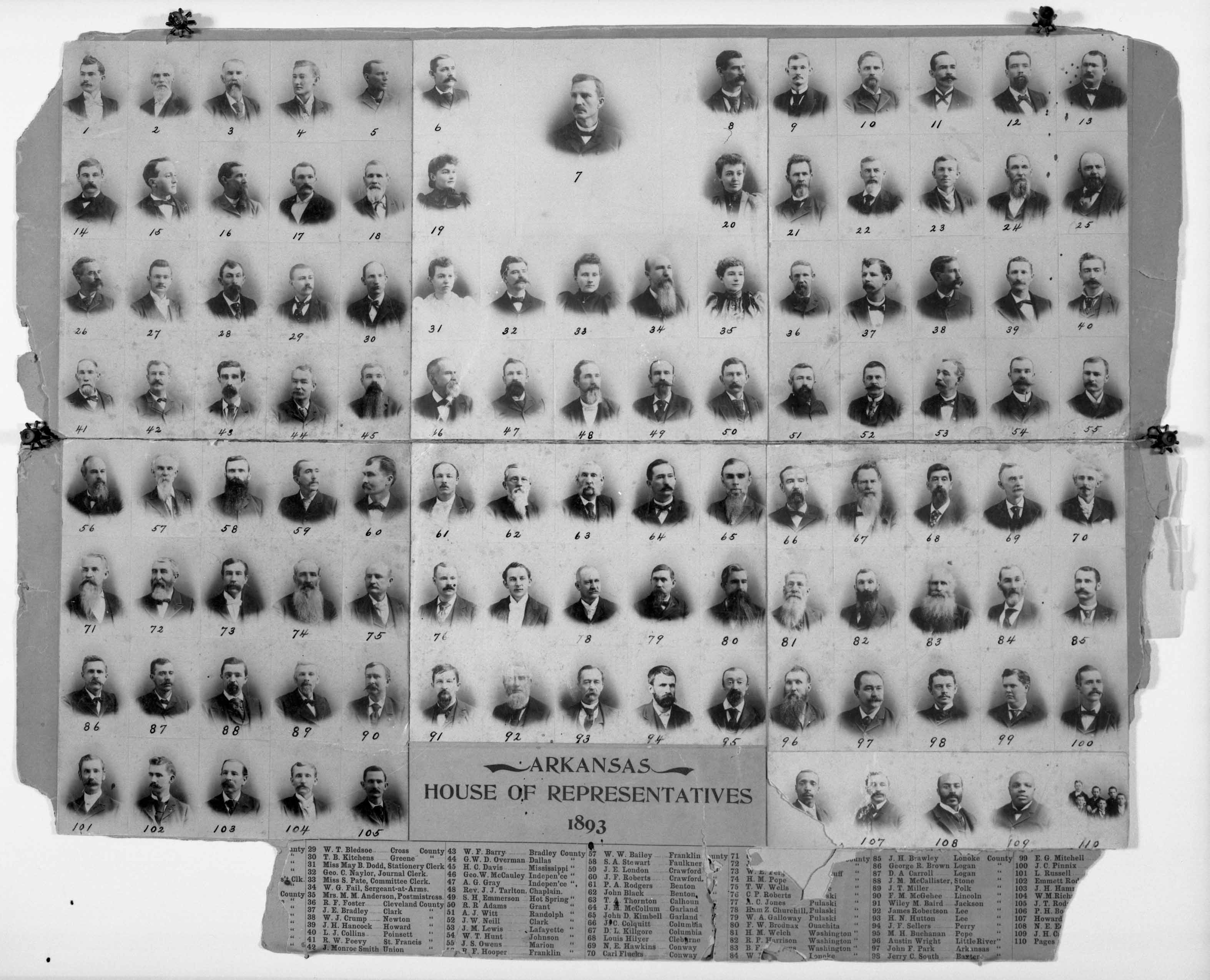
Photo of 1893 Arkansas House of Representatives (Crump is #38, 3rd column from the right and third down

William Jackson Crump was born on September 22, 1865, in Quincy, Hickory County, Missouri. He attended college in Weaubleau, Missouri. He studied law in Arkansas under his uncle George J. Crump.

He married Dora Owen in 1891, sister of judge Thomas Horner Owen. They had four children. Screenwriter, film director, and producer, Owen Crump was his son.

He served in the Arkansas House of Representatives from 1893 until 1894, and represented Newton County, Arkansas.

In 1944, Crump served as a delegate to the Democratic National Convention in Chicago, during the time of president Franklin D. Roosevelt and vice president Harry S. Truman.

He died at the age of 91 on February 10, 1957, in Houston, Texas.
