= Michael Elkins =

American journalist (1917–2001)

- Born: Meyer Elkins; January 22, 1917; New York, United States
- Died: March 10, 2001 (aged 84); Jerusalem
- Occupations: Journalist, broadcaster, and author
- Employers: CBS; Newsweek; BBC; The Jerusalem Report
- Known for: First to report at the beginning of the Six-Day War; Forged in Fury (author)
- Spouse: Martha Goldstein (marriage dissolved)
- Children: one son
- Relatives: Saul Elkins (brother); Leon Elkins (brother)

Michael Elkins (22 January 1917, in New York, United States – 10 March 2001, in Jerusalem) was an American broadcaster and journalist who worked for the American network, CBS, for the magazine Newsweek and then for 17 years with the BBC. He was the first to report Israel's destruction of Arab air forces on the opening day of the Six-Day War in 1967. CBS did not trust his report and he left.

== Origins ==
Elkins was the youngest of three sons of East European Jewish immigrants who made clothes in the sweatshops of the Lower East Side. He was embarrassed that his parents spoke Yiddish and that his father walked ahead of his mother in the street. He excelled at school and educated himself in libraries. He fell in with hoodlums in New York, then moved to the American West Coast as a union organiser before joining his brother Saul to write scripts in Hollywood. He worked in Europe in the Office of Strategic Services, the forerunner of the CIA during the second world war. In 1947 Elkins met Teddy Kollek (who in 1965 became mayor of Jerusalem) in New York. In 1947 he was organising illegal shipments of arms to the Jewish Haganah in Palestine. Elkins joined in. The FBI discovered his involvement and he and his wife, Martha, fled to Israel. They lived on a kibbutz, then moved a year later to Jerusalem.

== Career ==
Elkins began broadcasting with CBS in the US in September 1956. He became the network's correspondent in Israel. The previous correspondent said he was returning to the United States because "nothing ever happens in Israel". A month later Britain and France invaded Suez as Israeli tanks moved into Sinai. Elkins was the first to report Israel's destruction of Arab air forces on the first day of the Six Day War. He telephoned CBS but it hesitated to broadcast his story. The BBC ran it. Elkins had come across a politician he knew. The politician directed him to the war-room. Elkins wrote the story but Israeli military censors delayed it. Elkins proposed a deal. He would hold back the story if the censors gave him permission to be the first to broadcast when it was cleared. They agreed. CBS sent him a one-liner: "You alone with Israeli victory. You'd better be right." Elkins visited New York in the autumn and called on CBS. He was congratulated for his scoop. "Get lost," he said. "I resign." He said he didn't want the job if they didn't trust him. The journalist David Sells said:

He told me once that CBS had then 'offered him the earth' to stay as their correspondent, but he had refused. 'Well done,' I enthused, praising his probity. Elkins looked at me. 'I have to tell you something, David,' he said. 'If Newsweek had not already given me the earth, I would have been sorely tempted.' That was Elkins – tough-minded, but never stupid.

== Broadcasting style ==
Elkins never modified his New York accent and growl, making him unusual among the BBC's correspondents. He spoke in a dated, epic, 1940s American radio style. His obituary in The Independent in Britain described him as "a master story-teller, a reporter with attitude. Even in private conversation, he spoke in vivid, well-crafted sentences. His writings translated less well to the printed page. Without the voice, they appeared a touch contrived."

== Accusations of bias ==
Arab lobbyists in the Middle East protested that the BBC should not employ a Jew and a Zionist to report the Arab-Israeli conflict. Elkins replied: "My reports are a matter of public record. If anyone can find a pattern of bias, let him say so." The BBC supported him until his retirement in 1983.

== Jewish background ==
The Elkins family was traditional but not deeply religious. Elkins said in a BBC talk, A Jew at Christmas, that he lost his Jewish faith when Santa Claus refused a present at Macy's department store when he was eight, saying: "This ain't for you, Jewboy." He regained his faith, he said in the same broadcast, when he was at the liberation of Dachau in April 1945 as an American serviceman. He said he told a prisoner there that he didn't understand Yiddish; the man retorted: "Don't you speak the mother tongue? Aren't you a Jew?" "Elkins found that he did and he was," said The Independent's obituary.

John Le Carré, in “The Pigeon tunnel”, mentions a conversation with Elkins about his direct involvement in extrajudicial killings of alleged nazi war criminals, within the secret organization DIN/Nakam.

== Writing career ==
Elkins wrote Forged in Fury in 1971, about the Jewish hunt for Nazi war criminals. He was not a natural author and he returned a publisher's advance after being commissioned to write an autobiography. He joined the Jerusalem Report magazine as ombudsman and letters editor in 1990 and worked for another 10 years. He was there until two days before his death.
