= The Night Before the Divorce =

1942 film by Robert Siodmak

- Directed by: Robert Siodmak
- Written by: Gina Kaus (play); Ladislas Fodor (play); Jerry Sackheim
- Produced by: Ralph Dietrich
- Starring: Lynn Bari; Mary Beth Hughes; Joseph Allen
- Cinematography: J. Peverell Marley
- Edited by: John Brady
- Music by: Leigh Harline; Cyril J. Mockridge
- Production company: 20th Century Fox
- Distributed by: 20th Century Fox
- Release date: March 6, 1942
- Running time: 67 minutes
- Country: United States
- Language: English

The Night Before the Divorce is a 1942 American comedy film directed by Robert Siodmak and starring Lynn Bari, Mary Beth Hughes and Joseph Allen, adapted from the 1937 play of the same name by Gina Kaus and Ladislas Fodor.

== Cast ==
- Lynn Bari as Lynn Nordyke
- Mary Beth Hughes as Lola May
- Joseph Allen as George Nordyke (as Joseph Allen Jr.)
- Nils Asther as Victor Roselle
- Truman Bradley as Inspector Bruce Campbell
- Kay Linaker as Hedda Smythe
- Lyle Latell as Detective Brady
- Mary Treen as Olga - the Maid
- Thurston Hall as Bert 'Mousey' Harriman
- Spencer Charters as Small Town Judge
- Leon Belasco as Leo - the Headwaiter
- Tom Fadden as Captain Walt
- Alec Craig as Jitters Noonan

== Bibliography ==
- Alpi, Deborah Lazaroff. Robert Siodmak: A Biography. McFarland, 1998.
- Greco, Joseph. The File on Robert Siodmak in Hollywood, 1941-1951. Universal-Publishers, 1999.
