= René Belbenoît =

French criminal and author (1899–1959)

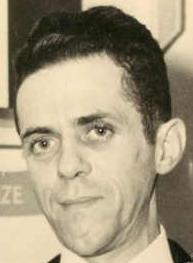
- Belbenoît in 1938
- Born: 4 April 1899; Paris, France
- Died: 25 February 1959 (aged 59); Lucerne Valley, California, U.S.
- Notable work: Dry Guillotine

Signature
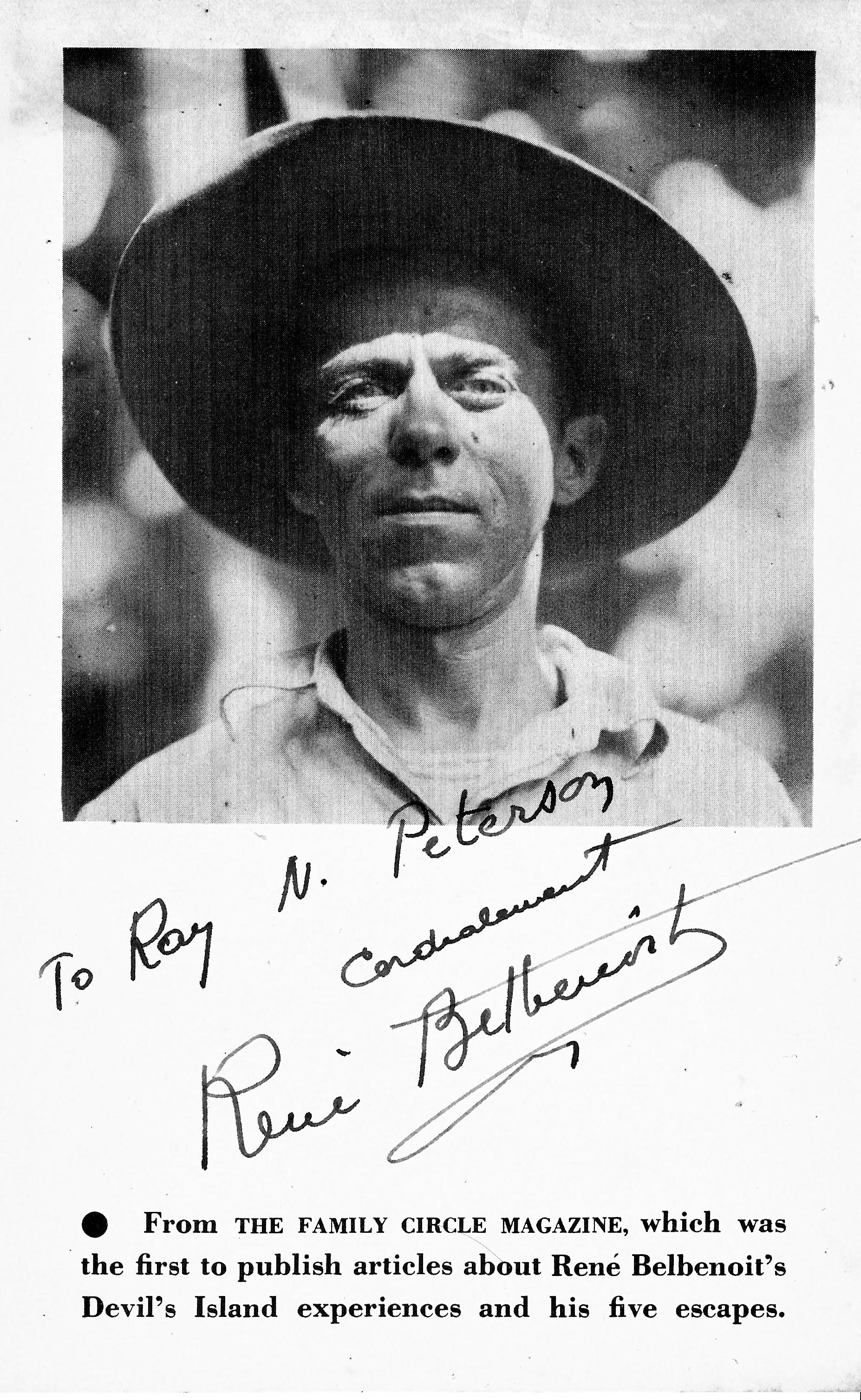

Jules René Lucien Belbenoît (French: [ʁəne bɛlbənwa]; 4 April 1899 – 25 February 1959) was a French prisoner on Devil's Island who successfully escaped to the United States. He later published the memoirs, Dry Guillotine (1938) and Hell on Trial (1940), about his exploits.

== Early life ==
René Belbenoît was born on April 4, 1899, in Paris.

During his childhood, in the 1900s, Belbenoît was separated from his mother, Louise Daumière, while she was working as a teacher for the children of the Czar of Russia. Belbenoît's father, Louis Belbenoît, who worked as the conductor of the Paris-Orleans Express, was rarely at home and could not raise the young René himself. Belbenoît was then sent to live with his grandparents.

In 1911, when Belbenoît was 12 years old, his grandparents died suddenly and he, again in need of a parental figure, went to Paris where he lived with and worked for his uncle at a popular nightclub. Between 1913 and 1916, Belbenoît worked in his uncle's nightclub, the Café du Rat Mort on Place Pigalle in Paris. A teenager left to his own devices, he quickly became known to the law for petty shoplifting in 1916 and did not escape the house of correction. From 1916 to 1917, Belbenoît served with distinction in the French army during World War I. He survived the Battle of Verdun when he was only 17 years old. Belbenoît had volunteered before the conscription call in 1918, when he was 19, and he was carrying out his military service while the French Army signed the Armistice between France with Germany on November 11, 1918, ending World War One. He left the army in 1920.

== Scams, burglaries and thefts ==
Between 1920 and 1921, Belbenoît committed several scams, burglaries and shoplifting offences. Belbenoît committed various crimes in Tours, Saint-Nazaire, Chartres, in company with people whom he had come to know in the past. As he defrauded, burgled, and robbed people — these events taking place over a year — Belbenoît accumulated a large number of victims. Belbenoît had no particular criteria for the victims. In June 1921, Belbenoît began working in a restaurant in Besançon as a dishwasher for eight francs a day along with room and board. After having worked there for only 11 days, Belbenoît stole a wallet containing 4,000 francs, then a motor scooter that he used to leave Besançon, and moved to Nantes. When he arrived in Nantes, Belbenoît was out of work, but soon began work as a valet at the Ben Ali Castle, property of the Comtesse d'Entremeuse. Despite the benevolence of his employer, Belbenoît only worked for one month at the castle. In August 1921, while working at Ben Ali Castle, Belbenoît took advantage of the monument to steal the pearls of the Comtesse d'Entremeuse as well as some money from her dressing table. Belbenoît escaped directly and found refuge on a train to Paris. He finally went to Dijon, after only two days in Paris.

On August 18, 1921, Belbenoît was hired as a waiter in a restaurant located in Dijon. The next day, he broke into the room containing his boss's office and stole 2,800 francs from the cash box, then fled to Paris by train. Arriving in Paris, Belbenoît sent a letter to his boss and thanked her for the 2,800 francs. The boss lodged a complaint and the police managed to go back to the bank of Paris, using the stamp inscribed on the letter, then managed to identify the person who posted this letter as René Belbenoît, 22, wanted by the police in Tours, Saint-Nazaire, Chartres, Nantes and Besançon.

== Arrest and trial ==
René Belbenoît was arrested in Paris on August 21, 1921, and placed in pre-trial detention. While in prison, after a first indictment for the theft from the restaurant in Dijon, Belbenoît was also charged with the multiple thefts, scams and frauds for which he was wanted. Although the acts committed by Belbenoît were misdemeanors, the young man was sent back to the Dijon Assize Court, on grounds that he was in a state of recidivism as a repeat offender.

Belbenoît appeared on May 22, 1922, before the Dijon Assize Court for the acts of fraud, burglary and shoplifting committed in Tours, Saint-Nazaire, Chartres, Besançon, Nantes and Dijon. At age 23, Belbenoît already had a heavy past behind him that did not incline to indulgence. Moreover, during the trial, Belbenoît behaved stoically, showing no remorse and was haughty. The Assize Court also considered that Belbenoît was far from being in a position to mend his ways because of his recidivism. Found guilty, Belbenoît was sentenced to 8 years of forced labor in the penal colony of French Guiana. By virtue of the "doubling", this sentence meant that after completing the sentence of forced labor, the convicted person was required to stay in French Guiana for a time equal to his sentence before being able to return to mainland France.

Contesting his conviction, which forced him to stay in French Guiana until his death (even after his release), Belbenoît filed an appeal in cassation but the Court of Cassation dismissed the appeal a few months later. Belbenoît was placed, in January 1923, the prison of Saint-Martin-de-Ré while waiting to serve his prison sentence in French Guiana. On the morning of June 7, 1923, Belbenoît left the Saint-Martin-de-Ré prison of aboard the freighter Le Martinière. The journey lasted 14 days during which all the prisoners condemned to the Bagne – killers and thieves – were transported and some of them killed other freed inmates during the journey.

== Imprisonment ==
René Belbenoît landed on June 21, 1923, in the penal colony of Saint-Laurent-du-Maroni with the status of "transported". Aged only 24, Belbenoît offered a first escape plan to one of his fellow prisoners, Léonce, who accepted his proposal, also seeking to escape. Despite the warnings of more experienced prisoners, the two convicts then prepared provisions and a raft to ensure their escape. On August 14, 1923, Belbenoît attempted a first escape along with Léonce. They embarked on a raft, but the current of the sea being relatively strong, the two convicts ran aground a few kilometers further down the French shore. They spent the night there in traumatic circumstances, as he would later explain in his memoir, Dry Guillotine. The next morning, René and Léonce got back on their raft and managed to reach Dutch Guiana. They arrived on the shore but, forced to walk through the jungle, René and Léonce were surrounded by a troop of Indians, who brought them back to the penal colony of Saint-Laurent-du-Maroni. The two convicts were sent to the mitard du Bagne, a place for other prisoners who had tried to escape, and where it was common for one prisoner to kill another. Belbenoît nevertheless escaped death. After leaving the mitard, Belbenoît, still a convict in Cayenne, became a nurse in the prison and prepared a new escape plan.

Devil's Island in French Guiana, 1955. In the foreground is St. Joseph Island, known for punishment and solitary confinement. In the background lies Royale Island, and to the back right is Devil's Island, designated for political prisoners.

On November 18, 1924, around 9 p.m., Belbenoît escaped again, in the company of a gang of seven other "tough guys": "Lulu", "Gipsy", "Jojo" (Gipsy's companion), "Le Basque", and three other convicts. The next morning, the escapees were blown off course by the wind towards the Dutch Guianan coast. Following this, "Le Basque" (one of the escapees), calling himself "connaisseur", convinced the group to tie cords to the canoe.The rope broke in heavy waves, carrying away the provisions. The rest of the troupe, being furious, stabbed "Le Basque" in the heart on the order of "Lulu". A few days later, after a long journey, "Gipsy" killed "Jojo" with a saber in order to rob him. Following the discovery of "Jojo's" body by the other escapees, "Lulu" stabbed "Gipsy" and disembowelled him, before the five surviving members ate his remains. The next day, the troop resumed their march towards Dutch Guiana, before being surrounded by Indians, who brought the band back to the Bagne de Cayenne. Belbenoît's sentence was increased by six months, while the other surviving escapees had a year added to their sentences. Belbenoît would later admit in his book that he "was no longer himself", after several days of the escapade, starvation and the journey.

Following his return to Bagne de Cayenne, René Belbenoît signed a petition to protest against the conditions of detention. The revolts of Belbenoît annoyed the administration of the Bagne, which led to his being placed under the surveillance of the prison guards in 1925 and 1926, news which aroused a lively debate among journalists on the subject. In July and August 1927, a British journalist, having interviewed Belbenoît, published press articles on the daily life of the convicts of Cayenne. Following this, Belbenoît, now 28, attempted two new escapes, but these did not succeed and he saw his sentence increased by 13 months from his conviction, now at nine years and one month of forced labor instead of the 8 years of forced labor to which he had been sentenced.

== Release and recidive ==
René Belbenoît was released from the Bagne de Cayenne on September 21, 1930, after serving his nine years in prison. Before the Warden Siadous was transferred back to France, he gave Belbenoît a one-year permit to leave the penal colony. Belbenoît spent most of this year working in the Panama Canal Zone as a gardener. However, with the one year permit soon to expire, he decided to go back to France in order to argue his case. In November 1931, longing to return to Paris, Belbenoît decided to embark on a boat leading to Le Havre, but was stopped when he arrived at his destination. Belbenoît was charged with violation of his parole and the conditions of his release, and he returned to prison while awaiting trial. On October 14, 1933, Belbenoît was sentenced to three years of additional forced labor for his clandestine return to France. He was sent back to French Guiana's Bagne de Cayenne on the same freighter as Henri Charrière, known as "Papillon".

== Release, escape and success of "Dry Guillotine" ==
On November 2, 1934, Belbenoît was officially released, but that just meant he became a libéré, a free prisoner who was still not allowed to return to France. He made a living by capturing and selling butterflies and making items out of natural rubber and selling them. During the years of his imprisonment he had lost all his teeth. Belbenoît planned yet another escape from French Guiana. He met five other convicts, nicknamed "Bébère", "Dadar", "Cap", "Panama" and "Chiflot", who are also forced to stay in French Guiana until the end of their lives. On May 2, 1935, Belbenoît and his gang escaped from the colony by sea. The six escapees traveled for seventeen days in a 19-foot boat and then reached Trinidad, where the English entrusted them with a sinking trawler. The escapees could stay on the island for three weeks and were given new supplies, and even a new boat. On June 10, they continued their trip. Sixteen days later they ran aground on a beach in Colombia, and locals stole their clothing. They reached Santa Marta, Colombia, where a local general fed them, but he also notified the French consul and took them to the local military prison.

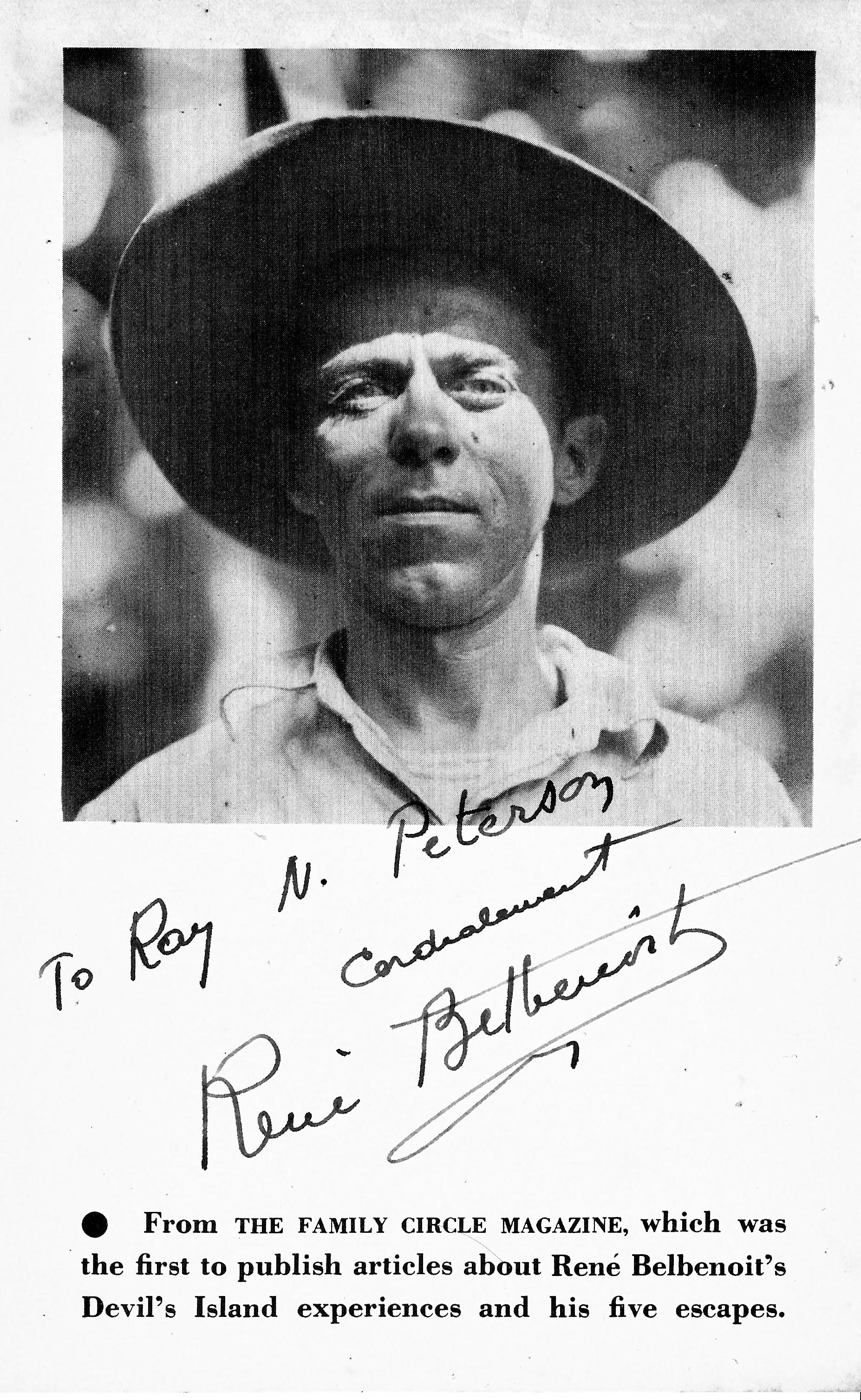
Belbenoit Autographe

However, some of the local authorities separated Belbenoît from the others and, with the cooperation of local prison authorities, a sympathetic local newspaperman helped him to escape in April 1936 in exchange for writing about prison conditions. Belbenoît traveled slowly north and stole a number of native canoes to continue his journey.

In Panama he spent about seven months with the Guna tribe and later sold a large collection of butterflies in Panama City. There he also met Preston Rambo, who worked to translate his manuscript into English. In La Libertad, El Salvador, he hid in a ship that took him to Los Angeles in March 1937. In 1938, Belbenoit's memoir of his imprisonment, Dry Guillotine, was published in United States with an introduction by the prominent South American explorer and journalist William LaVarre. The best-selling memoir went through 14 printings in less than a year.

Dry Guillotine attracted the attention of the U.S. immigration authorities, and Belbenoît was arrested. He received a visitor's visa, but was told to leave the U.S. in 1941. Belbenoît then traveled to Mexico, and tried to slip back into the United States a year later. However, he was arrested in Brownsville, Texas, and sentenced to 15 months in prison. After his release, Belbenoît acquired a valid passport and went to Los Angeles to work for Warner Bros. as a technical advisor for the film Passage to Marseille (1944).

In 1951, Belbenoît moved to Lucerne Valley, California, and founded René's Ranch Store, where he also lived. Neighbors knew who he was. His new book, Hell on Trial, again attracted the attention of immigration authorities, and in May 1951 he was summoned to Los Angeles. His former movie co-workers from Passage to Marseille spoke on his behalf, and he received U.S. citizenship in 1956.

== Personal life ==
Belbenoît married Lee Gumpert, a widow who had one son, William Gumpert.

== Death ==
Six months before the penal colony of Cayenne would be officially closed by the French Fourth Republic, Belbenoît died of cardiac arrest at his store in Lucerne Valley on February 26, 1959, aged 59.
