= One Who Came Back =

1951 American documentary film

- Produced by: Owen Crump
- Production company: Disabled American Veterans
- Distributed by: Motion Picture Association of America
- Release date: 1951
- Country: United States
- Language: English

One Who Came Back is a 1951 American short documentary film produced by Owen Crump and the National Organization of Disabled American Veterans in cooperation with the United States Department of Defense and the Association of Motion Picture Producers, about an American soldier wounded in the Korean War, rescued from behind enemy lines and transported back to the United States. It was distributed by all film companies free of charge. It was nominated for an Academy Award for Best Documentary Short.
