= William LaVarre =

American explorer and journalist (1898–1991)

William J. LaVarre (1898–1991) was an American geographer, explorer, and journalist known for his books Up the Mazaruni for Diamonds (1919) and Southward ho! A Treasure Hunter in South America (1940) and for his anti-communist writings. He was the brother of actor John Merton and filmmaker André de la Varre.

== Biography ==
LaVarre was born on August 4, 1898, in Richmond, Virginia, to naval shipbuilder William Johanne LaVarre and Leilia Goddin Hayes LaVarre. His grandfather, William LaVarre, was killed by a disgruntled millworker in Twiggs County, Georgia. LaVarre graduated from Townsend Harris Hall in New York, and took evening geography classes at Columbia University; later he was a special geography student at Harvard. In the 1920s, he was sent to British Guiana as a collector of specimens for several geographic societies and became an expert on Brazilian rubber. In 1922 he made headlines for discovering what he claimed was the world's largest diamond, in British Guiana.

In 1933, at age 31, LaVarre became the owner and editor of the Spartanburg Herald-Journal in South Carolina, after a hostile takeover. He also served as President of the Piedmont Press Association.

In 1935 LaVarre who was diamond-hunting in Suriname and heard a story about a man who from the sky, and was now living with the Amerindians in Paloemeu, who LaVarre believed to be the missing airman Paul Redfern. The American consulate sent an expedition to the village, but found nothing.

In 1938, LaVarre met the famous prison escapee René Belbenoît and helped him publicize his memoir, Dry Guillotine, and wrote the Introduction. Dry Guillotine is considered more reliable and possibly the basis of the book Pappillon by Henri Charrière on which the 1973 film, Pappillon was based

LaVarre was widely known for antisemitic views. In 1951 LaVarre published "Moscow's Red Letter Day" in the American Legion Magazine accusing Franklin Delano Roosevelt of inviting communism into the Americas in a secret deal with Maxim Litvinov that led to normalizing diplomatic relations with the Soviet Union by accepting the ambassadorship of A.A. Troyanovsky and appointing William Christian Bullitt Jr. ambassador to the Soviet Union. He was editor of the right wing magazine The American Mercury from 1957 to 1958.

LaVarre married Alice Lucille Elliott in 1927; the couple had one daughter, Yvette, who later married James Cornelius Ruddell Jr., who was captured and held as a POW by North Korea during the Korean War.

LaVarre was a Fellow of the American Geographical Society and the Royal Geographical Society (England). His papers are held at the Hoover Institute.

== Books ==
- La Varre, William (June 16, 1941). Southward ho! A treasure hunter in South America. Travel Book Club. OCLC 35319668.
- Lavarre, William J (June 16, 1927). Up the Mazaruni for diamonds. Marshall Jones Co. OCLC 462587525.
- La Varre, William (June 16, 1935). "Gold, diamonds and orchids". Fleming H. Revell Co. – via Open WorldCat.
- Jungle Treasure (1936)
