= Samuel A. Derieux =

Samuel Arthur Derieux (1881–1922) was an American writer, known especially for short stories, set in the South, about dogs, hunting, or both.

He was born in Richmond, Virginia in 1881. His undergraduate education was in the South, at Wofford College from 1897 to 1899, and at Richmond College (now the University of Richmond), where he received his B.A. in 1904. He spent two years of graduate work at Johns Hopkins, and received his M.A. at University of Chicago in 1910.

He worked as an assistant professor of English at Richmond (1910-'11), Missouri State Normal School ('11-'13), and Wake Forest ('15-'17).

Derieux had already published a few stories, and in 1917 he joined the editorial staff in the New York offices of The American Magazine, where he then published one in each of the next two years, and two to six a year thereafter. He was among the winners of an O. Henry memorial award in the awards' first year, and was the first author to accumulate three of the awards ('19, '21, and—posthumously -- '22). He died in Manhattan of appendicitis at the age of 41 on February 25, 1922.

== A Boy and His Dog ==
In 1946, Derieux received posthumous story credit for the short film A Boy and His Dog. (The film's 6 characters correspond closely to the most important of those of his O. Henry-winning 1918 story "The Trial in Tom Belcher's Store", including the subtle point that the crucial character Squire Kirby is (once) addressed as "Jim Kirby", and (once) referred to as "Squire Jim Kirby", in the story, which corresponds to the film cast's character being specified as "Squire Jim Kirby". The story parallels in essentials the (widely circulated) plot summary for A Boy and His Dog that is attributed to David Glagovsky by the Internet Movie Database. While they agree in starting the action on Friday, the film's summary is more detailed in specifying Monday as the day of the trial; the story simply says "Then one afternoon..." (not "the next day"), following a Saturday of hunting by an unknown interval, and places the trial on the day following the consequently unspecified afternoon.

== Writings ==
(Stories marked * appear in the collection Frank of Freedom Hill.)

- "The Little Boy in the Blackberry Patch"*
- "Blood Money"*
- "The Call of Home"*
- Her Sammy (1916)
- The Magnet (1916)
- Frank of Freedom Hill (1917)
- The Destiny of Dan VI* (AM March 1917)
- "The Crisis in Room 25"* (AM February 1918, but "The Crisis in 25" when collected)
- "Paradise Regained"* (AM February 1919)
- "One Friend Jim Taylor Lacked" (AM May 1919)
- "The Trial in Tom Belcher's Store"* (AM, June 1919)
- "Old Frank Sees It Through"* (AM, November 1919)
- "Terrible Charge Against Jeff Potter" (AM, February 1920)
- "The Pursuit"* (AM, November 1920)
- "Old Frank to the Rescue" (AM, March 1921)
- "The Bolter"* (AM, September 1921)
- "The Most Wonderful Bird Dog in the World" (AM, October 1921)
- "Old Mac and Young Doc" (AM, August 1921)
- "Joe Goes After the Doctor" (AM, November 1921)
- "The Comet" (AM, December 1921)
- "An Act of God"* (AM, March 1922)
- "Invisible Huntsman" (AM, June 1922)
- "Billy Thompson’s Plan for Revenge" (AM, July 1922)
- "Old Gideon—Detective" (AM, March 1923)
- "Wild Bill McCorkle" (AM, August 1924)
- The Sixth Shot (1922)
- Frank of Freedom Hill (1922) (collection of stories previously published 1917-21)
- "Bird Dogs I Have Known" (AM, May 1923)
- Animal Personalities (1923)
- "Sheriff" (AM, October 1928)
