= The Adventures of Frank Race =

Tom Collins portrayed Frank Race in 22 episodes.

The Adventures of Frank Race was an American radio adventure serial syndicated by Bruce Eells Productions. The 30-minute program's first East Coast broadcast was 1949, and the show ran 43 episodes. Because it was syndicated, it aired on different stations on different days. For instance, in New York City, the first episode ran on WINS on April 9, 1949. It "began running in some markets May 1, 1949." The series was broadcast on the West Coast from 1951–52.

Each episode opened with a one-minute organ theme and then the following from announcer Art Gilmore:

The war changed many things; the face of the earth and the people on it. Before the war, Frank Race worked as an attorney, but he traded his law books for the cloak-and-dagger of the OSS. And when it was over, his former life was over, too... adventure had become his business!

== Characters and story ==
Frank Race mainly investigated international insurance scams around the globe in various exotic locations, making him something of a cross between James Bond and Johnny Dollar. After Tom Collins played the title role for the first 22 episodes, Paul Dubov took over the lead role. Tony Barrett portrayed Race's sidekick, Mark Donovan. Other actors included Jack Kruschen, Wilms Herbert, Lillian Buyeff, Frank Lovejoy and Harry Lang.

== Production ==
The series was written and directed by Joel Murcott and Buckley Angel. Ivan Ditmars provided the background organ music. It was syndicated by Broadcasters Program Syndicate.

== Episodes ==
East Coast premiere broadcasts

#	Date	Title
01	May 1, 1949	"The Hackensack Victory"
02	May 8, 1949	"The Darling Debutante"
03	May 15, 1949	"The Istanbul Adventure"
04	May 22, 1949	"The Seventeen Black"
05	May 29, 1949	"The Enoch Arden Adventure"
06	June 5, 1949	"The Vanishing President"
07	June 12, 1949	"The Baradian Letters"
08	June 19, 1949	"The Airborne Adventure"
09	June 26, 1949	"The Shanghai Incident"
10	July 3, 1949	"The Juvenile Passenger"
11	July 10, 1949	"The Reckless Daughter"
12	July 17, 1949	"The Silent Heart"
13	July 24, 1949	"The Garrulous Bartender"
14	July 31, 1949	"The Vanishing Favorite"
15	Aug 7, 1949	"The Embittered Secretary"
16	Aug 14, 1949	"The Talking Bullet"
17	Aug 21, 1949	"The Fat Man's Loot"
18	Aug 28, 1949	"The General's Lady"
19	Sept 4, 1949	"The Violent Virtuoso"
20	Sept 11, 1949	"The Fourth Round Knockout"
21	Sept 18, 1949	"The Three on a Match"
22	Sept 25, 1949	"The Roughneck's Will" (last episode with Tom Collins)
23	Oct 2, 1949	"The Green Doubloon" (first episode with Paul Dubov)
24	Oct 9, 1949	"The Sobbing Bodyguards"
25	Oct 18, 1949	"The Diver's Loot"
26	Oct 25, 1949	"The Adventures in Mormon Country"
27	Nov 1, 1949	"The Brooklyn Accent"
28	Nov 6, 1949	"The Six Week Cure"
29	Nov 13, 1949	"The Fairway Beauty"
30	Nov 20, 1949	"The Runway Queen"
31	Nov 27, 1949	"The Lady in the Dark"
32	Dec 4, 1949	"The Silent Tongue"
33	Dec 11, 1949	"The Kandy Killing"
34	Dec 18, 1949	"The Undecided Bride"
35	Dec 25, 1949	"The Gold Worshiper"
36	Jan 1, 1950	"The House Divided"
37	Jan 8, 1950	"The Pharaoh's Staff"
38	Jan 15, 1950	"The Count Trefanno Crest"
39	Jan 22, 1950	"The Night Crawler"
40	Jan 29, 1950	"The Kettle Drum"
41	Feb 5, 1950	"The Lovable Character"
42	Feb 12, 1950	"The Black Friar's Bridge"
43	Feb 19, 1950	"The Big Top" (last show of series)

== Listen to ==
- The Adventures of Frank Race in the Internet Archive's Old-Time Radio Collection
- Radio Detective Story Hour: The Adventures of Frank Race
- OTR Net Library, all 43 episodes of The Adventures of Frank Race
- Zoot Radio, Free downloads of The Adventures of Frank Race radio show
