= Dry Guillotine =

Translation of French prison slang

Coordinates: 5°17′38″N 52°35′0″W

Dry Guillotine is the English translation of the French phrase la guillotine sèche, which was prisoner slang for the Devil's Island penal colony at French Guiana. It is also the title of several articles by various authors and most notably, a very influential and successful book by former prisoner #46,635, René Belbenoît.

== Examples of usage ==
=== By Charles W. Furlong ===
The earliest work in the United States making use of the term "dry guillotine" appears as a 14-page article in Harper's Magazine, titled "Cayenne-the Dry Guillotine" (June 1913), by Charles W. Furlong, FRGS. The article carefully details the cruel and often intentionally lethal conditions of life for bagnards (prisoners) in French Guiana and lists, by name, several specific examples of young men doomed to live out their lives at one of the many camps or prisons which comprised the prison colony commonly, but incorrectly, referred to today as Devil's Island.

=== By René Belbenoît ===
The best known work by this name is René Belbenoît's memoir, Dry Guillotine, Fifteen Years Among The Living Dead (1938) (also known as I Escaped From Devil's Island). Dry Guillotine chronicles Belbenoît's childhood, his commission of two non-violent and relatively minor thefts from employers, and his subsequent capture, conviction, and transportation to French Guiana. Belbenoît actually wrote the manuscript for Dry Guillotine while in prison and carried the work wrapped in oilskins, to protect it from the elements. Protected in this manner, the manuscript survived countless rainstorms and unexpected dunkings in the ocean and rivers between Cayenne and California, where Belbenoît finally managed to reach the United States and freedom in 1937.

While a prisoner at Cayenne, Belbenoît was introduced to the American author Blair Niles, who bought several works from Belbenoît for use in her book titled Condemned to Devil's Island (1928), which also uses the term. Mrs. Niles paid Belbenoît handsomely for his work, and it was this money which financed the next two escape attempts Belbenoît made.

Dry Guillotine, Fifteen years among the Living Dead was first published in 1938, copyright E. P. Dutton, and was so popularly received that 14 further printings were made in the first year of publication. Additional printings were made by Blue Ribbon Books in 1940, and the book remained incredibly popular for many years.

=== In Colonial Africa ===
The use of the term "dry guillotine" spread throughout the French Empire following the publication of Belbenoît's work, and was used to refer to similar penal institutions where combinations of harsh physical labour, poor living conditions and tropical environments led to high death rates. The prison camp where Samori Ture spent his last years, the small island of Missanga in the middle of the Ogooué River near Ndjolé, Gabon was known as the 'la guillotine sèche' due to the death rate among prisoners.

== See also ==
- Henri Charrière, inmate
  - Papillon (1970), novel by Henri Charrière
  - Banco (1973), autobiography by Henri Charrière and a sequel to Papillon
