= George J. Crump =

American Confederate Army officer, lawyer and Arkansas state legislator

George James Crump
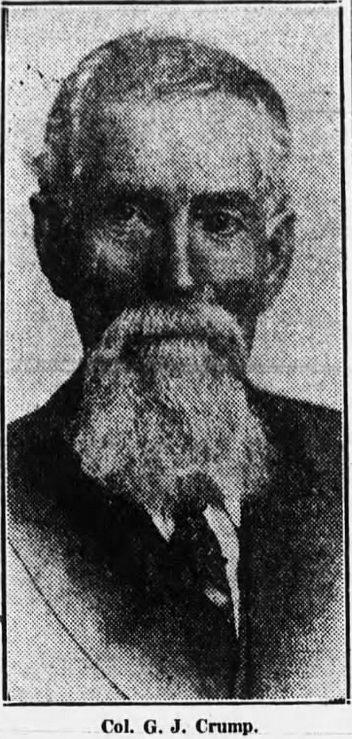
- (circa 1922)

Arkansas House of Representatives
- In office 1871–1873

Personal details
- Born: June 13, 1841 Harlan County, Kentucky, U.S.
- Died: December 4, 1928 (aged 87) Harrison, Arkansas, U.S.
- Resting place: Rose Hill Cemetery, Harrison, Arkansas, U.S.
- Party: Democratic
- Spouse: Josephine B. Crump (poet died 1921)
- Relations: William Jackson Crump (nephew)

George James Crump (June 13, 1841– December 4, 1928) was an officer in Confederate Army during the American Civil War, a lawyer, a state legislator for one term in the Arkansas House of Representatives and a public official. He also went by the name G. J. Crump.

== Early life ==
Crump was born June 13, 1841, in Harlan County, Kentucky to John G. and Eliza Crump. He moved with his family to a farm in the Crooked Creek Valley in Carroll County, Arkansas around 1854. Crump attended private school in Carrollton, Arkansas until his education was cut short by the start of the American Civil War.

He enlisted in the Confederate States Army in 1861 at Carrollton, Arkansas, and during the war he served with Company E of the 16th Arkansas Infantry Regiment. He was involved in several important battles including the Battle of Oak Hills, the Battle of Farmington, the Battle of Iuka and the Battle of Corinth. During the Siege of Port Hudson he was captured but escaped by swimming across the Mississippi River. By the end of the war he had obtained the rank of captain.

== Career ==
After the war he was elected a clerk of Carroll County but lost the position due to post war reconstruction. He obtained the bar in 1869 and started practicing in Carrollton before going on to start a law firm in Harrison, Arkansas and he continued to work as a lawyer for most of his life. In 1918 he was listed as part of the Harrison firm of Crump & Crump.

At a district convention in October 1870 Grump was nominated, along with three others, for election to the lower house of the legislature. He was duly elected and served in the Arkansas House of Representatives for one session from 1871 until 1873.

When the Brooks–Baxter War started in April 1874 he was made a lieutenant colonel. He is noted on the Confederate Memorial at the Boone County Courthouse. He served as a U.S. Marshal from 1893 until 1897 in the west district of the state.

Crump had been appointed as a member of the board of directors of the Louisiana Purchase Exposition, or St. Louis World's Fair, in May 1901, but in April 1902 he was replaced by governor Jeff Davis with J C Rembert.

51 years after he served in the Arkansas House of Representatives, in March 1922, he was on the ballot for the seat for the third district in the Arkansas Senate. In June 1922 he was standing unopposed but by July Roy Milum had stood against him and attacking him accusing Crump of blackmailing him. Milum went on to defeat Crump by a narrow margin winning the Democratic nomination.

== Death ==
Crump died December 4, 1928, at his step-daughters home in Harrison after a long illness aged 87. He was survived by one son and one daughter, his wife Josephine B. Crump, a writer and poet, had died in a few years earlier in 1921. He had been working as a lawyer until a few months prior to his death. He is buried at the Rose Hill Cemetery in Harrison.
