= André de la Varre =

American filmmaker (1904–1987)

- Born: September 14, 1904; Washington, D.C., US
- Died: December 19, 1987 (aged 83); Vienna, Austria
- Occupations: Film producer and cinematographer

André de la Varre (September 14, 1904 – December 19, 1987) was a leading American travelogue filmmaker from a prominent family who started as a 17-year-old visiting Europe with a recently acquired movie camera at the end of World War I. Born Franklin LaVarre, he was the brother of noted Western actor John Merton (born Myrtland LaVarre), the journalist/explorer William LaVarre, and the international businessman Claude LaVarre.

By 1924, he was working with Burton Holmes and eventually struck out on his own as an independent producer with a short film series called "Screen Traveler" in the thirties. Locales included Singapore, Sumatra, Java, Bali, Philippines, France, the Mediterranean region, Netherlands, Austria, Egypt and Palestine. With Harold Autin and Paul B. Devlin contributing as producers, these highly professional travelogues received wider distribution by Nu-Art in 1936 and enjoyed a second life as educational material in public schools, being reissued for copyright in the 1950s.

Columbia Pictures commissioned him to provide material for a number of their own documentary shorts starting in 1939, recycling some footage he shot earlier in France as well as new material scouted mostly in the United States, Canada and the Caribbean on account of the war in Europe. A typical reel, well received in 1942 by BoxOffice magazine, was Cajuns of the Teche, covering Louisiana's local culture.

It was with Warner Brothers that he was at his most prolific and most polished. His long association with that studio began with his early 1943 covering (the simply titled) Snow Sports of Lake Placid, New York, and the Tropical Sportland of Florida; by now, he was working in full Technicolor. These one-reel Sports Parade and two-reel Technicolor Specials benefited greatly from rousing studio orchestra scores (many by Howard Jackson and William Lava) and additional writing by Owen Crump, among other seasoned studio veterans. Strong narration by radio familiars Art Gilmore and Marvin Miller were an added plus.

A 1949-filmed Palio di Siena, Grandad of Races, was an Academy Award winner. Other notable titles include That's Bully, covering the Running of the bulls in Pamplona (filmed '48 and released early '50), Emperor's Horses (featuring the Lippizaner in Austria, 1951), Carnival in Rio (1953) and Who's Who In The Zoo (1954). In 1954, he started shooting them also in CinemaScope for Warner's Scope Gem series, culminating in a couple made in India, Burma and Thailand. One of several covering Germany, Time Stood Still, was Oscar-nominated in early 1957.

He returned to Burton Holmes Inc. shortly before the founder's passing in 1958 and was soon busy with lengthy features like 1965's Grand Tour of London and Paris (by Day and by Night). Collaborating on many of these was his son André De La Varre Jr. (There were at least two more travelogues of Switzerland added to Warner's program, one holding the distinction of being Warner's final theatrical short release in 1970.)

Despite financial problems with the Burton Holmes company and a shrinking market for travelogues, he still managed another well-received 90 minute feature These States for the Bicentennial Council in 1975. His later years were spent in Austria.

== See also ==
- Scope Gem
- Sports Parade
- Technicolor Specials (Warner Bros. series)
- Travel documentary
