= Sam Balter =

American basketball player and sportscaster

- Balter playing for UCLA, circa 1929

Personal information
- Born: October 15, 1909 Detroit, Michigan, U.S.
- Died: August 8, 1998 (aged 88) Los Angeles, California, U.S.
- Listed height: 5 ft 10 in (1.78 m)
- Listed weight: 150 lb (68 kg)

Career information
- High school: Lincoln (Los Angeles, California); Roosevelt (Los Angeles, California)
- College: UCLA (1926–1929)
- Position: Forward
Medals
Men's basketball
Representing the United States
Olympic Games
Gold medal – first place	1936 Berlin	Team competition

Samuel Balter Jr. (October 15, 1909 – August 8, 1998) was an American basketball player who won a gold medal at the 1936 Summer Olympics. He played college basketball for the UCLA Bruins. He was also a renowned sportscaster.

== Career ==
Balter was born in Detroit, Michigan. He attended Lincoln High School, and then Roosevelt High School, both in Los Angeles. In his college years, he attended the University of California, Los Angeles, where he played basketball for the Bruins, serving as captain in 1929. He also played for an amateur basketball team sponsored by Universal Pictures.

He competed in the 1936 Summer Olympics. As a Jew, he had some hesitation about playing in the Olympics hosted by Hitler's Germany, but was persuaded when he was assured by Avery Brundage that there would be no Nazi propaganda at the games. The Nazi regime had passed the anti-Semitic Nuremberg laws the prior Fall which stripped German Jews of citizenship, opportunities to receive a public education, and access to many professions and public facilities. Jewish businesses had been boycotted, forcing many businesses to close, and Jews could not serve in the legal profession, the civil service, teach in secondary schools or universities or vote or hold public office.

At the 1936 Berlin Olympics, Balter was part of the American basketball team which won the gold medal. He played in two matches, but not the final match in which the U.S. team won the gold medal. He was one of a number of Jewish athletes who won medals at the 1936 Berlin Olympics during the Nazi regime. The Berlin Olympic final concluded the first official Olympic Basketball competition, with the United States defeating Canada, 19–8. At the games, the medals were awarded by James Naismith, the inventor of basketball. The game was low scoring, as it was played outdoors in a converted tennis stadium with clay courts that had become somewhat muddy after a heavy rain, making dribbling and ball handling difficult. Irving Maretsky, a member of the Canadian team they played in the final game, noted that the American's height advantage was a key component in their victory, as at the time the rules required each score to be followed by a jump at center court. The wet court also made rapid passing and dribbling difficult, making height more of a factor than speed or ball handling.

Balter later turned his celebrity into a career as a Los Angeles sportscaster, announcing at radio station KLAC from 1946 to 1962, and starting his TV career on a local station in 1950. He was known as the "voice of UCLA football and basketball" and also wrote sports columns for the Los Angeles Herald-Express.

Balter was the broadcast announcer for the Los Angeles Stars of the American Basketball Association before the ABA-NBA merger. He also appeared in a number of movies and television shows, always portraying a radio announcer or sportscaster.

Balter is a member of the Amateur Athletic Union (AAU) Hall of Fame, the International Jewish Sports Hall of Fame, the Southern California Broadcasters Hall of Fame, the Southern California Jewish Sports Hall of Fame, and the UCLA Athletics Hall of Fame.

== Personal life ==
Balter was married and had a daughter. He died as a result of complications from abdominal surgery on August 8, 1998, at the age of 88.

== Filmography ==
- Straightaway (1961–1962), two episodes

== See also ==
- List of Jews in sports § Basketball
