= Truman Bradley (actor) =

American actor (1905–1974)

Truman Bradley (February 8, 1905 – July 28, 1974) was an actor and narrator in radio, television and film.

== Early years ==
Bradley was born February 8, 1905, in Sheldon, Missouri. Although he wanted to be an actor, he followed his parents' desires and studied law.

== Career ==
=== Radio ===
Bradley began his career in the 1930s as a radio broadcaster. Working at WBBM in Chicago, Illinois, some considered him "the Mid-West's leading news commentator." He was selected by Henry Ford to be the announcer for the Ford Sunday Evening Hour, for which he flew to Detroit, Michigan, each weekend. With his distinctive, authoritative voice, he soon became a radio actor as well as a narrator in numerous movies. In the mid-1940s, Bradley was a newscaster with KERN in Bakersfield, California.

Bradley was the announcer for Red Skelton's program, Burns and Allen Easy Aces, the Frank Sinatra Show and Screen Guild Players.

=== Film ===
A newspaper columnist wrote in 1942 that representatives of the film industry "had stalked him [Bradley] in Chicago, pouncing on him with such enthusiasm and rich offers that he could not, in honesty to himself, refuse." He received critical praise for his work in The Night Before the Divorce in 1942. He was also in Northwest Passage (1940), Millionaires in Prison (1940) and Murder Among Friends (1941).

=== Television ===
Bradley was the host of the 1950s syndicated TV series Science Fiction Theatre. He occasionally worked as an actor in films (including two Charlie Chan mysteries in the 1930s) and live theater. He made his final acting appearance in a 1960 episode of the American legal drama Perry Mason entitled "The Case of the Madcap Modiste" playing a grey-haired television interviewer and the episode's narrator. He then retired.

== Other business activities ==
In 1937, Bradley and his sister bought the Chicago-based Mme. Huntingford Cosmetic Company. He was the company's president, and Elene Bradley was general manager, "active in the sales end of the business."

== Family ==
Bradley married Evelyn Jane Esenther of Oak Park, Illinois, September 8, 1937.

He married actress Myra Bratton January 12, 1940, in Las Vegas, Nevada. Bratton filed for divorce in Los Angeles, California, March 17, 1941. The divorce was granted November 17, 1941.

He later had a complex relationship with actress Phyllis Ruth, whom he married in 1942. Three years later, she announced plans to file for divorce. Early in 1946, however, a newspaper columnist reported: "The judge who ruled that Starlet Phyllis Ruth and Radio Announcer Truman Bradley could live in the same house, though separated, did a smart thing. They are reconciled now and are going to have a baby in June." A July 14, 1946, column by Jimmie Fidler reported, "The Truman Bradleys ... got a six-pound baby girl."

== Death ==
Bradley died July 28, 1974, in Hollywood, California, at the Motion Picture Home.

== Filmography ==
| Year | Title | Role | Notes | |
|---|---|---|---|---|
| 1932 | Are You Listening? | Radio Announcer | Uncredited | |
| 1938 | Vacation from Love | Mark Shelby | | |
| 1938 | Young Dr. Kildare | Jack Hamilton | | |
| 1938 | Spring Madness | Walter Beckett | | |
| 1939 | The Ice Follies of 1939 | Paul Rodney | Voice, Uncredited | |
| 1939 | The Hardys Ride High | Clerk | | |
| 1939 | 6,000 Enemies | Reporter | Uncredited | |
| 1939 | Stronger Than Desire | Man in Courtroom | Uncredited | |
| 1939 | On Borrowed Time | James Northrup | | |
| 1939 | Miracles for Sale | Nightclub Master of Ceremonies | Uncredited | |
| 1940 | Northwest Passage | Captain Ogden | | |
| 1940 | Millionaires in Prison | Dr. William 'Bill' Collins | | |
| 1940 | We Who Are Young | Commentator | Voice, Uncredited | |
| 1940 | A Night at Earl Carroll's | Radio Announcer | | |
| 1941 | Murder Among Friends | McAndrews | | |
| 1941 | Dead Men Tell | Capt. Kane | | |
| 1941 | The Goose Goes South | Narrator | Voice, Uncredited | short |
| 1941 | Last of the Duanes | Texas Ranger Capt. Laramie | | |
| 1941 | Mob Town | Officer Cutler | | |
| 1941 | Burma Convoy | Victor Harrison | | |
| 1941 | Keep 'Em Flying | Butch | | |
| 1941 | They Died with Their Boots On | 7th Michigan officer | Uncredited | |
| 1942 | Bombay Clipper | Dr. Gregory Landers | | |
| 1942 | Treat 'Em Rough | Jordan Perkins | | |
| 1942 | The Night Before the Divorce | Inspector Bruce Campbell | | |
| 1942 | Lone Star Ranger | Phil Lawson | | |
| 1945 | Objective, Burma! | Narrator - Opening Sequence | Voice, Uncredited | |
| 1945 | The Horn Blows at Midnight | Radio Announcer | | |
| 1946 | Mr. Ace | Radio Forum Moderator | Uncredited | |
| 1947 | I Wonder Who's Kissing Her Now | Martin Webb | | |
| 1948 | Call Northside 777 | Narrator | Voice, Uncredited | |
| 1948 | Fighter Squadron | Narrator | Voice, Uncredited | |
| 1949 | Special Agent | Narrator | Voice | |
| 1952 | Macao | Narrator | Voice, Uncredited | |
| 1952 | Confidence Girl | Narrator | Voice, Uncredited | |
| 1953 | Never Wave at a WAC | Narrator | Voice, Uncredited | |
| 1955-1957 | Science Fiction Theatre | Narrator | | |
| 1960 | Perry Mason (1957 TV series) | Grey-Haired Television Interviewer/Narrator | (Episode: The Case of the Madcap Modiste) | (final appearance) |
