= Carl Dudley =

American film director (1910–1973)

Carl Ward Dudley
- Born: December 31, 1910; Little Rock, Arkansas
- Died: September 2, 1973 (aged 62); Hong Kong
- Resting place: Ventura Calif
- Education: UCLA
- Occupation(s): Film director and producer
- Employer: Self
- Known for: Short films, documentaries
- Spouse: Eleanor Murphy
- Children: 6 daughters
- Relatives: Richard Murphy (brother-in-law); Gabriel Katzka (son-in-law)

Carl Ward Dudley (1910–1973) was an American film director and producer. He was best known for directing and producing short travelogues.

== Biography ==
=== Early life ===
Carl Ward Dudley was born on December 31, 1910, in Little Rock, Arkansas.

=== Career ===
He became a film director and producer. Indeed, in 1944, he founded the Dudley Pictures Corporation, a film production company.

In the 1950s, he produced thirty documentary shorts in the This World of Ours series. In 1958, he directed and produced the Cinerama feature South Seas Adventure.

=== Personal life ===
He married Eleanor Murphy, the sister of screenwriter Richard Murphy (1912-1993). One of their daughters, Carol Ward Dudley, married producer Gabriel Katzka (1931–1990).

=== Death ===
He died on September 2, 1973, in Hong Kong.

== Filmography ==
=== As a director ===
- Our African Frontier (documentary, short film, 1943).
- Our Alaskan Frontier (documentary, short film, 1943).
- Star Spangled City (documentary, short film, 1946).
- All Aboard (short film, 1946).
- Rhythm of a Big City (documentary, short film, 1948).
- Pigskin Skill (short film, 1948).
- Cradle of the Republic (documentary, short film, 1949).
- Hawaiian Sports (short film, 1951).
- Aloha Nui (documentary, short film, 1953).
- Fish Tales (short film, 1954).
- Coney Island Holiday (documentary, short film, 1954).
- Below the Rio Grande (documentary, short film, 1954).
- Valley of the Sun (documentary, short film, 1954).
- Sportsman's Holiday (documentary, short film, 1955).
- Journey to the Sea (documentary, short film, 1955).
- Heart of an Empire (documentary, short film, 1955).
- VistaVision Visits Gibraltar (documentary, short film, 1956).
- VistaVision Visits Panama (documentary, short film, 1956).
- Viva! Cuba (documentary, short film, 1956).
- Magic in the Sun (documentary, short film, 1956).
- Under Carib Skies (documentary, short film, 1957).
- South Seas Adventure (1958)

=== As a producer ===
- This World of Ours: Norway (documentary, short film, 1950).
- This World of Ours: Denmark (documentary, short film, 1950).
- This World of Ours: Glacier National Park (documentary, short film, 1950).
- This World of Ours: Sweden (documentary, short film, 1950).
- This World of Ours: France (documentary, short film, 1950).
- This World of Ours: Holland (documentary, short film, 1950).
- This World of Ours: London (documentary, short film, 1951).
- This World of Ours: Portugal (documentary, short film, 1951).
- This World of Ours: Spain (documentary, short film, 1951).
- This World of Ours: England (documentary, short film, 1951).
- This World of Ours: Hawaii (documentary, short film, 1951).
- This World of Ours: Greece (documentary, short film, 1951).
- This World of Ours: Belgium (documentary, short film, 1951).
- This World of Ours: Switzerland (documentary, short film, 1951).
- This World of Ours: Italy (documentary, short film, 1951).
- This World of Ours: Egypt (documentary, short film, 1951).
- This World of Ours: Puerto Rico (documentary, short film, 1952).
- This World of Ours: Chile (documentary, short film, 1952).
- This World of Ours: India (documentary, short film, 1952).
- This World of Ours: Ceylon (documentary, short film, 1953).
- This World of Ours: Singapore (documentary, short film, 1953).
- This World of Ours: Germany (documentary, short film, 1953).
- This World of Ours: Japan (documentary, short film, 1953).
- This World of Ours: Hong Kong (documentary, short film, 1954).
- This World of Ours: Formosa (documentary, short film, 1954).
- This World of Ours: Ireland (documentary, short film, 1954).
- This World of Ours: Thailand (documentary, short film, 1954).
- This World of Ours: Bali (documentary, short film, 1954).
- This World of Ours: Venezuela (documentary, short film, 1955).
- The Mississippi Traveler (documentary, short film, 1955).
- This World of Ours: Caribbean Sky Cruise (documentary, short film, 1955).
- This World of Ours: Turkey (documentary, short film, 1955).
- VistaVision Visits Gibraltar (documentary, short film, 1956).
- Hero on Horseback (documentary, short film, 1956).
- VistaVision Visits Panama (documentary, short film, 1956).
- VistaVision Visits Austria (documentary, short film, 1956).
- South Seas Adventure (1958).

=== As an executive producer ===
- Tobor the Great (1954).
- The Days of Our Years (short film, documentary, 1955).

=== As a writer ===
- Portrait of a Genius (short film), 1943
