= Gordon Hollingshead =

American film director (1892–1952)

- Born: January 8, 1892; Garfield, New Jersey, U.S.
- Died: July 8, 1952 (aged 60); Balboa Island, California, U.S.
- Occupations: Producer, director
- Years active: 1916–1952

Gordon Hollingshead (January 8, 1892, in Garfield, New Jersey – July 8, 1952, in Balboa Island, California) was an American film producer, associate producer and assistant director. He holds the record for the most Academy Award nominations in the Best Live Action Short Film category (20 nominations). His films include patriotic subjects.

== Career ==
Hollingshead began his career as an assistant director, with his first work being the 1916 film The Shrine Girl, in which he also had an acting role. Through the silent film era, Hollingshead assisted in the direction of thirteen films, and continued as an assistant director until 1934. He joined Warner Bros. in 1921, where he remained until his death.

He produced his first film, Morocco Nights, in 1934. This started him on the path of producing, which would lead to enormous success. From 1934 to 1953, Hollingshead produced 174 films and film shorts. He received sixteen Oscar nominations, and won seven Oscars, including for the short film Star in the Night and the documentary short film Hitler Lives (both 1945). In 1944, he produced the 16-minute film I Am an American, featured in American theaters as a short feature. The film was created in connection with I Am an American Day, now called Constitution Day and Citizenship Day. Hollingshead was the cousin of the mother of actress Gene Tierney.

== Death ==
He was residing in Balboa Island, California at the time of his death on July 8, 1952, aged 60. Three of his short films were released posthumously in 1953.

== Home video availability ==
Hollingshead's shorts can also be found as extras on DVDs of classic Warner Bros. films of the period:

- The Romance of Robert Burns is on the DVD of Hollywood Hotel
- Sons of Liberty is on the DVD of Dodge City
- Quiet, Please is on the DVD of Invisible Stripes
- Teddy, the Rough Rider is on the DVD of Knute Rockne, All American
- Cinderella's Feller and The Flag of Humanity are on the DVD of Virginia City
- Alice in Movieland is on the DVD of The Sea Hawk
- Pony Express Days is on the DVD of Torrid Zone
- Henry Busse and His Orchestra is on the DVD of Brother Orchid
- The Tanks are Coming is on the DVD of Objective, Burma!
- At the Stroke of Twelve is on the DVD of The Great Lie
- The Gay Parisian is on the Blu-Ray of The Maltese Falcon
- Forty Boys and a Song is on the DVD of The Bride Came C.O.D.
- Calling All Girls is on the DVD of The Big Street
- Shoot Yourself Some Golf is on the DVD of Gentleman Jim
- Spanish Fiesta is on the DVD of In This Our Life
- Men of the Sky is on the DVD of Across the Pacific
- Beyond the Line of Duty is on the DVD of Yankee Doodle Dandy
- Food and Magic, The United States Navy Band and Three Cheers for the Girls are on the DVD of Thank Your Lucky Stars
- Musical Movieland and Desi Arnaz and His Orchestra are on the DVD of Night and Day
- Proudly We Serve, Report from the Front and I Am an American are on the DVD of Hollywood Canteen
- Oklahoma Outlaws, Wagon Wheels West, Gun to Gun and So You Want a Raise are on the DVD of Montana
- Jammin' the Blues and I Won't Play are on the DVD of Passage to Marseille
- Story of a Dog and Frontier Days are on the DVD of San Antonio
- Roaring Guns, Wells Fargo Days, Trial by Trigger and So You Want to Move are on the DVD of Rocky Mountain
- Star in the Night is on the DVD of Christmas in Connecticut
- The Voice that Thrilled the World and Okay for Sound are on the DVD of The Jazz Singer
- Cavalcade of Archery and Cruise of the Zaca are on the DVD of The Adventures of Robin Hood
- Facing Your Danger and Movieland Magic are on the DVD of Deception
- So You Want to Be in Pictures is on the DVD of The Hasty Heart
- Hollywood Wonderland is on the DVD of Tycoon
- Let's Sing a Song from the Movies is on the DVD of Romance on the High Seas
- So You Want to Be on the Radio and Calgary Stampede are on the DVD of Adventures of Don Juan
- So You Want to Be an Actor and The Grass is Always Greener are on the DVD of My Dream Is Yours
- So You Think You're Not Guilty is on the DVD of White Heat
- Grandad of Races is on the DVD of The West Point Story
- My Country 'Tis of Thee is on the DVD of Captain Horatio Hornblower R.N.
- Desert Killer and So You Want to Be a Bachelor are on the DVD of Starlift
- So You Want to Learn to Dance and So You Want a Television Set are on the DVD of By the Light of the Silvery Moon.
