= Owen Crump =

American film producer, director (1903–1998)

- Born: Owen Edward Crump; December 30, 1903; Muskogee, Oklahoma, U.S.
- Died: February 13, 1998 (aged 94); West Hollywood, California, U.S.
- Occupations: Screenwriter, film director, film producer, radio personality, stage actor, portrait painter
- Spouses: Jean Foster (m. 1930, divorced) Isabel Jewell (m. 1939; div. 1941) Lucile Fairbanks (m. 1942; died 1998)
- Father: William Jackson Crump

Owen Edward Crump (December 30, 1903 – February 13, 1998) was an American screenwriter, film director, film producer, radio personality, and stage actor. He worked alongside Warner Bros. Studios and made propaganda films for the United States Army Air Forces. He helped form the United States Army Air Forces's First Motion Picture Unit in 1942, where he served as a commander.

== Early life ==
Crump was born on December 30, 1903, in Muskogee, Oklahoma. His father was Arkansas politician and judge William Jackson Crump. His mother was Dora Owen, and his maternal uncle was Thomas Horner Owen. Owen Crump painted portraits in his early life.

== Career ==
In 1926, Crump performed in the show The Cajun on Broadway at the Nora Bayes Theatre. In 1936, he obtained copyrights for installments in the Death's Diary series.

He worked as a screenwriter for Jack Warner at Warner Bros. Studios. He made a series of "pro-American" propaganda short films for the U.S. government. After World War II, Warner chose him to helm the production of a series of four films.

Crump was a writer for the 1950 stage show, Southern Exposure on Broadway at the Biltmore Theatre. He worked on The Bell System Science Series films in the 1950s and 1960s.

In 1952, Crump was nominated for an Academy Award in "Best Documentary, Short Subjects" for his work as producer on the, One Who Came Back (1951).

Crump was interviewed by Douglas Bell from the Academy of Motion Picture Arts and Sciences, which was recorded in 1991, 1992, and 1994. Archival footage of Crump was used in the Oscar-winning documentary, The Last Days (1998) by director James Moll.

== Personal life ==
He married Jean Foster in 1930, and they lived in Shreveport, Louisiana. Crump was engaged to Isabel Jewell in 1936, and they married in 1939 however it ended in divorce in 1941. His third wife was Lucile Fairbanks, they were married in 1942, until his death in 1998.

== Filmography ==
Year	Film name	Role	Notes
1942	Miracle Makers	screenwriter	a short film starring Knox Manning
1942	Winning Your Wings	screenwriter	1942 Allied propaganda film of World War II, for the US Army Air Forces
1943	The Fighting Engineers	screenwriter	
1948	Silver River	producer	
1951	One Who Came Back	producer	a short documentary that received an Oscar nomination in 1952
1953	Cease Fire!	director	
1958	Gateways in the Mind	director	
1959	Alphabet Conspiracy	producer	
1960	The Thread of Life	director	
1962	It's About Time	director	
1962	The Couch	director	

== See also ==
- First Motion Picture Unit
