= Art Gilmore =

American actor

- Publicity photo of Art Gilmore
- Born: Arthur Wells Gilmore; March 18, 1912; Tacoma, Washington, U.S.
- Died: September 25, 2010 (aged 98); Irvine, California, U.S.
- Occupations: Actor; announcer
- Years active: 1935–2004
- Spouse: Grace Gilmore (m. 1938)

Arthur Wells Gilmore (March 18, 1912 – September 25, 2010) was an American actor and announcer heard on radio and television programs, children's records, movies, trailers, radio commercials, and documentary films. He also appeared in several television series and a few feature films.

== Biography ==
Reared in Tacoma, Washington, Gilmore attended Washington State University in 1931, where he was a member of the Chi chapter of Phi Mu Alpha Sinfonia music fraternity and a member of the Alpha Omicron chapter of Theta Chi fraternity. In 1935, he was hired to work as an announcer for Seattle's KOL Radio. In 1936, he became a staff announcer for the Warner Brothers radio station KFWB in Hollywood and then moved to the CBS-owned station KNX as a news reader. During World War II he served as a fighter-director U.S. Navy officer aboard an aircraft carrier in the Pacific Ocean.

Leaving the Navy, he decided to become a professional singer and returned to Hollywood.

With a group of notable Hollywood radio stars, including Edgar Bergen, Ralph Edwards, Les Tremayne, and Jim Jordan, Gilmore founded Pacific Pioneer Broadcasters in 1966. At the time of his death, he was Chairman Emeritus of PPB. The organization presents the Art Gilmore Career Achievement Award four times each year to celebrities who have made notable contributions to the broadcasting and related industries. The organization was renamed Hollywood Media Professionals in 2019. Pacific Pioneer Broadcasters materials are at American Radio Archives.

== Radio ==
Gilmore's announcing voice became a part of many radio programs. Drawing his inspiration from the radio sports commentators of the 1930s, he became the announcer for Amos 'n' Andy, The Adventures of Frank Race, Dr. Christian, Sears Radio Theater, Stars over Hollywood, The Golden Days of Radio and other radio shows. It was Gilmore who introduced Herbert W. Armstrong and Garner Ted Armstrong, reminding listeners to request free religious literature at the conclusion of The World Tomorrow on radio and television.

== Television ==
With the advent of television, Gilmore heralded The George Gobel Show, The Red Skelton Show, An Evening with Fred Astaire and many others.

He narrated 156 episodes of Highway Patrol with Broderick Crawford, 39 segments of Mackenzie's Raiders with Richard Carlson 41 episodes of Men of Annapolis and all 36 episodes of The New Breed.

His television appearances included The Mary Tyler Moore Show, Adam-12, Emergency!, Dragnet and The Waltons. He announced Ronald Reagan's "A Time for Choosing" speech in 1964 supporting Barry Goldwater for U.S. President.

== Films ==
Gilmore was heard in films as the voice of President Franklin Delano Roosevelt in the 1942 production of Yankee Doodle Dandy, and in The Gallant Hours (1960), where he was the narrator for Japanese sequences. His dramatic voice was also heard on countless film trailers beginning in the 1940s (he narrated the trailer for the 1946 film Gilda), and on documentary films throughout the 1950s and 1960s. (He appeared on camera at the beginning of the trailer for the 1948 thriller The Big Clock.) He narrated the Joe McDoakes series of short comedies which starred George O'Hanlon, notably So You Want to Be a Detective (1948), in which he participated (with the camera as his point of view). Gilmore also served as the president of American Federation of Television and Radio Artists (AFTRA) from 1961 until 1963.

== Recordings ==
In addition to his radio-TV work, he provided the narration for many collections of recorded musical works and a large number of recordings for children. Gilmore was also active in reading textbooks for the blind and dyslexic for many years.

== Books ==
Gilmore co-authored the book Television and Radio Announcing.

== Death ==
He died of natural causes on September 25, 2010, aged 98. Gilmore was survived by his wife, Grace; daughters Marilyn and Barbara; two grandchildren; and four great-grandchildren. His nephew, Robb Weller, said that his uncle was the reason he chose to work in broadcasting.

== Filmography ==
Year	Title	Role	Notes
1941	The Lone Wolf Takes a Chance	Newsreel Announcer	Uncredited
1942	Saboteur	Radio Broadcaster	Voice, Uncredited
1942	Yankee Doodle Dandy	Franklin D. Roosevelt	Voice, Uncredited
1943	Mission to Moscow	Commentator	Uncredited
1943	Action in the North Atlantic	President Franklin D. Roosevelt	Voice, Uncredited
1946	Rendezvous 24	Agent Thompson / Narrator	Uncredited
1946	The Man Who Dared	Radio Announcer	Uncredited
1946	Deadline for Murder	Bit Role	Voice, Uncredited
1946	Blue Skies	Radio Broadcaster	Voice, Uncredited
1947	Backlash	Radio Commentator	Voice, Uncredited
1947	Welcome Stranger	Radio Announcer	Voice, Uncredited
1947	The Unsuspected	Announcer	Uncredited
1948	The Strange Mrs. Crane	Radio Broadcaster	Uncredited
1949	My Dream Is Yours	Radio Announcer	Uncredited
1949	King of the Rocket Men	Newscaster	Serial, [Ch. 5], Voice, Uncredited
1949	The Girl from Jones Beach	Narrator	Voice, Uncredited
1950	Appointment with Danger	Narrator	Uncredited
1950	Tea for Two	Radio Announcer	Voice, Uncredited
1951	Valentino	Narrator at End	Voice, Uncredited
1951	A Place in the Sun	Radio Broadcaster	Voice, Uncredited
1951	Sunny Side of the Street	Announcer	Uncredited
1951	The Tanks Are Coming	Narrator	Voice, Uncredited
1952	The Winning Team	Radio Sports Announcer	Voice, Uncredited
1952	The Story of Will Rogers	Announcer at Political Convention	Uncredited
1952	Barbed Wire	Opening Narrator	Voice, Uncredited
1952	Battles of Chief Pontiac	Narrator	Uncredited
1954	It Should Happen to You	Don Toddman	Uncredited
1954	Creature from the Black Lagoon	Narrator	Voice, Uncredited
1954	Susan Slept Here	The Oscar	Voice, Uncredited
1954	Rear Window	Radio Announcer	Voice, Uncredited
1954	Dragnet	Doctor	Uncredited
1954	Tobor the Great	Airport Announcer	Voice, Uncredited
1955	Unchained	Narrator	Voice, Uncredited
1955	City of Shadows	Radio Broadcaster	Voice, Uncredited
1955	Francis in the Navy	Lieutenant Hopper	Uncredited
1955	Wiretapper	Narrator	Voice
1955	Three Stripes in the Sun	Public Address Announcer	Voice, Uncredited
1955	The Court-Martial of Billy Mitchell	Radio Broadcaster	Voice, Uncredited
1956	The Killing	Narrator	Voice, Uncredited
1956	A Cry in the Night	Television Announcer	Voice, Uncredited
1956	The Boss	Radio Broadcaster	Voice, Uncredited
1956	Rodan	Narrator	English version, Voice, Uncredited
1957	Fear Strikes Out	Broadcaster	Voice, Uncredited
1958	The Narcotics Story	Narrator	Voice
1958	Suicide Battalion	Captain Hendry	Uncredited
1960	Who Was That Lady?	Television Announcer	Uncredited
1960	The Gallant Hours	Narrator: Japanese Sequences	Voice
1962	To Kill a Mockingbird	Trailer Narrator	Voice, Uncredited
1963	The Nutty Professor	Narrator	Voice, Uncredited
1963	Johnny Cool	Racetrack Announcer	Voice, Uncredited
2001	Moonbeams	The Moon	(final film role)
