= Melody Master =

Warner Brothers big band musical film shorts

The Melody Masters were a series of first-rate big band musical film shorts produced by Warner Brothers, under the supervision of Samuel Sax at their Vitaphone studio in New York between 1931 and 1939, and in Burbank, California with producer Gordon Hollingshead in charge between 1940 and 1946.

== Overview ==
Among the most popular short subjects of their kind (making the Motion Picture Herald top money-making shorts lists in 1939); these were an offshoot of the Vitaphone Varieties. Each ran from 9 to 11 minutes in length and was produced in black and white.

While rival studios like Universal Pictures focused mostly on the performance itself in their own “Name Band Musicals” shorts, Warner Bros. added more storyline material and visual experimentation. Early films often used a gimmick to frame the musical performances such as the roller skates used in Eddie Duchin & His Orchestra. As the series progressed, the uses of multiple exposures (a great example being Symphony of Swing with Artie Shaw), optical effects, mirrors (i.e. Glen Gray and the Casa Loma Orchestra) and stark shadow lighting (i.e. Henry Busse and His Orchestra) made this series stand out against the competition.

Jean Negulesco was a key director on some of the best titles of the early 1940s before graduating to features. Life (magazine) photographer Gjon Mili contributed to the most frequently seen today title, Jammin' the Blues, entered into the National Film Registry in 1995.

After the series’ official end in 1946, there were two follow-up series called “Memories from Melody Lane” and “Hit Parade of the Gay Nineties” that differed somewhat in style and narration, tracing the history of popular music since the 1890s.

== Current availability ==
A group of them were released on laser disc (through MGM/UA) and Warner DVD, starting in the 1990s. In the latter format, they were mostly “extras” with various Warner features before the Warner Archive Collection produced a set titled Warner Bros. Big Band, Jazz & Swing Shorts in 2010.

== List of titles ==
Below is a full listing by title, director and major credits, followed by release date, review date (Film Daily) or copyright date. DVD availability is also provided.

=== 1931 ===
Title	Major credits	Review date (Film Daily)
Rhythms of a Big City	Harold Levy (director) John Hickey & Billy Gilbert	August 23
The Big House Party	Earl Carpenter	September 27
A Havana Cocktail	Castro Cuban Orchestra	October 4
Musical Moods	Horace Heidt & His Californians	December 6
Darn Tootin'	Rudy Wiedoeft with Dixie Lee & Lucille Page	December 6

=== 1932 ===
Title	Major credits	Release, copyright or review date	Notes
Up on the Farm	Roy Mack (director); Henry Santrey & Band with Dudley Clements, Barney Grant & the Three Moderns	March 27 (Film Daily review)	
It's a Panic	Roy Mack (director); Benny Meroff & His Orchestra	April 10 (Film Daily review)	
Music to My Ears	Roy Mack (director); Jack Denny & Orchestra, Dorothy Brent, George Tapps, Jean & Lynton	September 17	
The Yacht Party	Roy Mack (director); Roger Wolf Kahn, Gertrude Niesen & Melissa Mason	© September 29	Sometimes listed as a “Vitaphone Variety”. Warner Bros. Big Band, Jazz & Swing Shorts (Warner Archive) DVD
The Lease Breakers	Roy Mack (director); Willie Creager & Band, Aunt Jemima (Tess Gardella), Isabel Brown & the Colleano Wire Act	November 10 (Film Daily review)	

=== 1933 ===
Title	Major credits	Release, copyright or review date	Notes
Hot Competition	Roy Mack (director); The Continentals, Ted Husing, Harry Barris, Lois Whiteman & Ray Sax	© January 9	
Abe Lyman Band	Abe Lyman & His Band	January 20	
That's the Spirit	Roy Mack (director); Noble Sissle & The Washboard Serenaders, Cora La Redd	February 3 (Film Daily review)	Warner Bros. Big Band, Jazz & Swing Shorts (Warner Archive) DVD; Copyright date on opening credit is MCMXXXII (1932)
The Alma Martyr	Fred Waring & His Pennsylvanians	February 23 (Film Daily review)	
How's Tricks	Roy Mack (director); Howard Lanin Band	© February 25	
Hot from Petrograd	Joseph Henabery (director); Dave Apollon	May	
The Name is Familiar	Alfred J. Goulding (director); Leon Belasco & Band, Vivian Janis, Holland & Knight, Dorothy Dodge	© June 6	
David Rubinoff and His Orchestra	David Rubinoff & Jean Sargent	July	
The Audition	Roy Mack (director); Phil Emerton & Band, Hannah Williams (actress), the Three X Sisters, Larry & Larry	July 8	Warner Bros. Big Band, Jazz & Swing Shorts (Warner Archive) DVD & The Mayor of Hell DVD
A Castilion Garden	Joseph Henabery (director); Senor del Pozo's Marimba Band, Celso Ruttado, Tortolero de Medina, Senorita Adrina and Ismael Guzman	© August 1	
Barber Shop Blues	Joseph Henabery (director); Claude Hopkins, Orlando Roberson & Four Step Brothers	© September 23	Vitaphone Cavalcade of Musical Comedy Shorts (Warner Archive) DVD
Notre Dame Glee Club	Joseph Henabery (director); Charles Coleman	© November 11	
Eddie Duchin & His Orchestra	Joseph Henabery (director); Eddy Duchin	© November 25	Warner Bros. Big Band, Jazz & Swing Shorts (Warner Archive) DVD. Spelling of title is incorrect on screen.

=== 1934 ===
Title	Major credits	Release, copyright or review date	Notes
Mills Blue Rhythm Band	Roy Mack (director); with Sally Gooding, Fredi Washington & others	© February 6	Warner Bros. Big Band, Jazz & Swing Shorts (Warner Archive) DVD
Vincent Lopez and Orchestra	Joseph Henabery (director); Vincent Lopez & Sheila Barrett	© April 13	Warner Bros. Big Band, Jazz & Swing Shorts (Warner Archive) DVD
Big City Fantasy	Joseph Henabery (director); Phil Spitalny	April 14	Vitaphone Cavalcade of Musical Comedy Shorts (Warner Archive) DVD
Isham Jones & His Orchestra	Roy Mack (director); Isham Jones, Gypsy Nina, Eddie Vogt, Arthur & Rose Boylan	May 12	Warner Bros. Big Band, Jazz & Swing Shorts (Warner Archive) DVD
Richard Himber and His Orchestra	Roy Mack (director); Richard Himber, Joey Nash, Brhardt & Graham, Virginia MacNaughton	July	
Jolly Good Fellow	Joseph Henabery (director); B. A. Rolfe & the Men About Town, Dolly Arden & John Monahan	© July 5	
Little Jack Little	Joseph Henabery (director); Jack Little (songwriter)	August 22 (Film Daily review)	
Phil Spitalny & His Musical Queens	Joseph Henabery (director); Phil Spitalny & Mickey Braatz	August 23 (Film Daily review)	Vitaphone Cavalcade of Musical Comedy Shorts (Warner Archive) DVD
Mirrors	Roy Mack (director); Freddie Rich's Orchestra	© September 8	Vitaphone Cavalcade of Musical Comedy Shorts (Warner Archive) DVD
Ciro Rimac's Rhumba Orchestra	Joseph Henabery (director)	October	
Ben Pollack & His Orchestra	Joseph Henabery (director); Ben Pollack with Doris Robbins	© October 4	Warner Bros. Big Band, Jazz & Swing Shorts (Warner Archive) DVD
Mr. and Mrs. Jesse Crawford	Joseph Henabery (director); Mrs. & Mrs. Jesse Crawford, Margaret O'Donnell & John Creighton	October 15 (Film Daily review)	
Don Redman & His Orchestra	Joseph Henabery (director); Don Redman	October 29	Dames DVD & Vitaphone Cavalcade of Musical Comedy Shorts (Warner Archive) DVD

=== 1935 ===
Title	Major credits	Release, copyright or review date	Notes
Echoes	Joseph Henabery (director); Charles Davis & His Orchestra, Cackles O’Neill	© March 5	
Will Osborne and His Orchestra	Roy Mack (director); with Helen Ward (singer), Evelyn & James Vernon	© April 1	
Barney Rapp and His New Englanders	Joseph Henabery (director); Barney Rapp, Jack & June Blair, Ruby Wright	© April 1	
Freddie Martin and His Orchestra	Joseph Henabery (director); Freddie Martin, Paul & Eva Reyes	May 11	
The Wishing Stone	Roy Mack (director); Dave Apollon, Paul Perry & Zeni Vatori	© June 3	Warner Bros. Big Band, Jazz & Swing Shorts (Warner Archive) DVD
Borrah Minnevitch and His Harmonica Rascals (#2)	Roy Mack (director); Borrah Minnevitch	July 6	Warner Bros. Big Band, Jazz & Swing Shorts (Warner Archive) DVD
Phil Spitalny's All Girl Orchestra	Joseph Henabery (director); Phil Spitalny, Maurine & Nova	August 7	
Rubinoff and His Orchestra	Joseph Henabery (director) David Rubinoff, Loupoukin & Kounavsky, Martnoff, Adla Kuznetzoff	August 10	
Johnny Green & His Orchestra	Joseph Henabery (director); Johnny Green	September 6	Warner Bros. Big Band, Jazz & Swing Shorts (Warner Archive) DVD & Captain Blood (1935 film) DVD
By Request	Roy Mack (director) & Orlando Robeson; Claude Hopkins, Tip, Tap & Toe	October 18	
Borrah Minnevitch and His Harmonica Rascals	Roy Mack (director); Borrah Minnevitch	© October 28	filmed June 1933
Jack Denny's Orchestra	Jack Denny	November 29 (Film Daily review)	
Red Nichols & His World Famous Pennies	Joseph Henabery (director); Red Nichols, Bob Carter & the Wallace Sisters	December 30	Warner Bros. Big Band, Jazz & Swing Shorts (Warner Archive) DVD

=== 1936 ===
Title	Major credits	Release, copyright or review date	Notes
Jolly Coburn and His Orchestra	Joseph Henabery (director); with Kathleen Wells, Harold Richards & Lewis	February 22	
Off the Record	Joseph Henabery (director) B. A. Rolfe & Orchestra, the Music Hall Boys, and Sincair Twins	© March 9	Warner Bros. Big Band, Jazz & Swing Shorts (Warner Archive) DVD
Little Jack Little & Orchestra	Joseph Henabery (director); Jack Little (songwriter); with Dot, Donna & Teddy	March 28	Warner Bros. Big Band, Jazz & Swing Shorts (Warner Archive) DVD
Ramon Ramos and His Rainbow Room Orchestra	Joseph Henabery (director); with Manya & Drigo	April 18	
Meet the Kernel	Joseph Henabery (director) Dave Apollon & His Band	May 13 (Film Daily review)	
Vincent Lopez and His Orchestra	Joseph Henabery (director); Vincent Lopez, June Hart, Jack Holland, Maxine Tappan, Fred Lowry, and Johnnie Morris	May 13 (Film Daily review)	
Clyde Lucas and His Orchestra	Joseph Henabery (director); Clyde Lucas, Dave & Dorothy Fitzgibbons, Lyn Lucas, the Three Symphonettes	June 12 (Film Daily review)	
Carl Hoff and His Orchestra	Joseph Henabery (director); with Grace MacDonald, Sonny Schuyler & the Collegians	July 11	
Poets of the Organ	Joseph Henabery (director); Mr. & Mrs. Jesse Crawford, Robert Simmons	August 15	
Clyde McCoy and His Sugar Blues Orchestra	Joseph Henabery (director); Clyde McCoy	August 15	
Nick Lucas and His Troubadors	Joseph Henabery (director); Nick Lucas, Kay Kernan, Marion Witkins & Jack Walters	August 15	
Harry Reser & His Eskimoes	Roy Mack (director); Harry Reser	September 26	Warner Bros. Big Band, Jazz & Swing Shorts (Warner Archive) DVD
Leon Navara and His Orchestra	Lloyd French (director); with Honey & Weldon	November 7	
Emil Coleman and His Orchestra with The Nightingales	Roy Mack (director); with Harlan & Hart	© December 7	
Jimmie Lunceford and His Dance Orchestra	Joseph Henabery (director); Jimmie Lunceford	December 19	Warner Bros. Big Band, Jazz & Swing Shorts (Warner Archive), Blues in the Night (film) & Follow the Fleet DVD

=== 1937 ===
Title	Major credits	Release, copyright or review date	Notes
George Hall and His Orchestra	Roy Mack (director)	January 9	Warner Bros. Big Band, Jazz & Swing Shorts (Warner Archive) & Bullets or Ballots DVD
Swanee Cruise	Joseph Henabery (director); Louisiana Kings, Willis Ducre & the Robinson Twins	January 23	
Hi De Ho	Roy Mack (director); Cab Calloway	February 20	Warner Bros. Big Band, Jazz & Swing Shorts (Warner Archive) & Black Legion (film) DVD
Peter Van Steeden and His Orchestra	Joseph Henabery (director); Peter van Steeden, Harold Richards & Hazel Geary	March 6	
Jacques Fray & His Orchestra	Roy Mack (director); with Andrea Marsh, Louise & Andrew Carr	March 27	
The Jam Session	Joseph Henabery (director); Clyde McCoy & His Sugar Blues Orchestra	April 17	
A Musical Journey to South America	Joseph Henabery (director); Ciro Rimac Orchestra	May 8	
Eliseo Grenet & His Orchestra	Roy Mack (director); Eliseo Grenet, Conchita, Jose Negrette, R. Armangod & the Rhumba Sextette	June 15	
Lennie Hayton and His Orchestra	Joseph Henabery (director); Lennie Hayton, the Rhythm Kings, Billy Gilbert & Paul Barry	July 10	
The New Professor	Joseph Henabery (director); Jack Denny & His Orchestra, Chester Fredericks, LaNelle Avery, Judy Lane & George Pembroke	© July 21	
David Mendoza and Orchestra	Lloyd French (director); with Minor & Rot, Lucille Manners, Bob Simmons & the Revelers	July 31	
Russ Morgan and His Orchestra	Roy Mack (director); Russ Morgan, Bernice Parks, Tom MacDonald & Christine Ross	September 11	
Mal Hallett and His Orchestra	Lloyd French (director); Mal Hallett, Teddy Grace, Jerry Perkins, Buddy & Claire Green, and Wallace Bros.	September 11	
Milt Britton and His World Famous Orchestra	Lloyd French (director); with Walter Powell, Tito, Milt Britton & the Three Leslies	October 2	
Jan Rubini and Orchestra	Joe Henabery) with Lillian Dawson, Rosalean & Seville, Francis Pierlot	December 4	
Henry King and His Orchestra	Joseph Henabery (director) with Betty Allen	December 20	
Benny Meroff and His Orchestra	Roy Mack (director); with Jackie Marshall & Florence Gast	© December 20	

=== 1938 ===
Title	Major credits	Release, copyright or review date	Notes
Sin-Copation	Lloyd French (director); Leon Navara & His Band, Detmar Poppen	January 8	
Enric Madriguera and Orchestra	Lloyd French (director); Enric Madriguera & Patricia Gilmore	January 26	
Carl Hoff and His Orchestra (#2)	Joseph Henabery (director); with the Kidoodlers, Minor & Root, Patricia Norman & Jimmy Blair	February 12	
David Rubinoff and His Violin	Joseph Henabery (director); David Rubinoff, Colette & Barry	April 16	
Carl Deacon Moore and Orchestra	Lloyd French (director)	May 7	
Mike Reilly and Band	Lloyd French (director); with Marion Mikler	May 14	
Freddie Rich and His Orchestra	Lloyd French (director); Freddie Rich, Nan Wynn, and Joe Sodja	May 28	Warner Bros. Big Band, Jazz & Swing Shorts (Warner Archive) & The Adventures of Robin Hood (film) DVD
Clyde Lucas and Orchestra	Joseph Henabery (director); Clyde Lucas	June 18	
Don Bestor and Orchestra	Joseph Henabery (director); with Mildred Law, Ducky Yountz & Joan Merrill	July 9	
The Saturday Night Swing Club	Lloyd French (director); Leith Stevens, Bobby Hackett	July 30	Warner Bros. Big Band, Jazz & Swing Shorts (Warner Archive) DVD
Swing Cat's Jamboree	Roy Mack (director); Louis Prima, Shirley Lloyd, Ted Gary, and Mitzi Dahl	August 6	Warner Bros. Big Band, Jazz & Swing Shorts (Warner Archive) DVD
His Busy Day	Joseph Henabery (director); Clyde McCoy, Wilbur Gregg, and the Three Bennett Sisters	August 20	
Blue Baron and His Orchestra	Joseph Henabery (director) with Harris, Claire & Shannon, Russ Carlyle	August 27	
Larry Clinton and His Orchestra with Carol Bruce	Lloyd French & Joseph Henabery (directors); Larry Clinton, Carol Bruce, Martin & Robinson	September 3	Warner Bros. Big Band, Jazz & Swing Shorts (Warner Archive) DVD
Arnold Johnson and His Orchestra	Joseph Henabery (director); with Siroy & Weaver, Three Sirens & Three Orchids	September 11	
Ray Kinney and His Royal Hawaiian Orchestra	Roy Mack (director); Ray Kinney; with The Aloha Maids	October 1	Warner Bros. Big Band, Jazz & Swing Shorts (Warner Archive) DVD
Jimmy Dorsey and His Orchestra	Lloyd French (director); Jimmy Dorsey, Bob Eberle & Evelyn Oak	October 22	Warner Bros. Big Band, Jazz & Swing Shorts (Warner Archive) & Jezebel (film) DVD
Merle Kendrick and His Orchestra	Joseph Henabery (director); with Miriam Grahame, Marion Wilkins, and Jack Walters	November 12	
Music with a Smile in the Happy Felton Style	Lloyd French (director); Three Reasons, Bob Robinson, and Virginia Martin	December 3	
Dave Apollon and His Orchestra	Roy Mack (director); Dave Apollon with Buddy & Claire Green, Aunt Jemima (Tess Gardella) & Bobby Graham	© December 24	

=== 1939 ===
Title	Major credits	Release or copyright date	Notes
Jerry Livingston and His Talk of the Town Music	Lloyd French (director); Jerry Livingston, Jack & Jane Boyle, Adrian Rollini Trio. Barbara Richards	© January 4	
Clyde Lucas and His Orchestra	Lloyd French (director); Clyde Lucas, Rosalean & Seville, Lyn Lucas	January 7	
Russ Morgan and His Orchestra	Joseph Henabery (director); Russ Morgan, Gloria Whitney, Carolyn Clare & the Paradise Girls	February 25	
It's the McCoy	Joseph Henabery (director); Clyde McCoy & His Sugar Blues Orchestra, Wayne Gregg, the Three Bennett Sisters, and Tim Lorman	March 18	
Dave Apollon and His Club Casanova Orchestra	Lloyd French (director); Dave Apollon, Melissa Mason, May McKim, Ted Adair & Ruth Long	April 8	
Artie Shaw and His Orchestra	Roy Mack (director); Artie Shaw, Helen Forrest, and Tony Pastor (bandleader)	April 29	Warner Bros. Big Band, Jazz & Swing Shorts (Warner Archive) DVD
Larry Clinton & His Orchestra with Bea Wain	Joseph Henabery (director); Larry Clinton, Bea Wain, Ford Leary	May 20	Warner Bros. Big Band, Jazz & Swing Shorts (Warner Archive) DVD
On The Air (Saturday Night Swing Club)	Lloyd French (director); Leith Stevens and His Saturday Night Swing Orchestra, Mel Allen, Bobby Hackett’s Orchestra, Nan Wynn	June 10	
Rita Rio and Her Orchestra with Emily Adrien And Bill Furrow	Roy Mack (director); Rita Rio	July 1	Warner Bros. Big Band, Jazz & Swing Shorts (Warner Archive) DVD
Will Osborne and His Orchestra with Dick Rogers and Lynn Davis	Roy Mack (director)	July 22	
Symphony of Swing	Joseph Henabery; Artie Shaw & Orchestra	July	'arner Bros. Big Band, Jazz & Swing Shorts (Warner Archive) DVD
Eddie DeLange and His Orchestra with Elisse Cooper	Lloyd French (director); Eddie DeLange	August 12	
The Dipsy Doodler	Lloyd French (director); Larry Clinton & Orchestra	August	Warner Bros. Big Band, Jazz & Swing Shorts (Warner Archive) DVD
Swing Styles	Lloyd French (director); Adrian Rollini Trio, Milt Herth's Orchestra, Ruh & Jane Frazee, Tito and his Swingettes	September 2	
Vincent Lopez and His Orchestra with Betty Hutton	Joseph Henabery (director); Vincent Lopez, Betty Hutton, Johnny Russell (saxophonist), Fred Lowry & the Four Horsemen	September 30	Warner Bros. Big Band, Jazz & Swing Shorts (Warner Archive) DVD
Rubinoff and His Violin	Joseph Henabery (director); David Rubinoff, June Claire, Jack Holland & June Hart	November 11	

=== 1940 ===
Title	Major credits	Release or copyright date	Notes
Frances Carroll and the Coquettes	Roy Mack (director); with Viola Smith & Eunice Healy	February 10	filmed March 1939; Warner Bros. Big Band, Jazz & Swing Shorts (Warner Archive) DVD
Romance in Rhythm	Lloyd French (director); Carl Hoff & His Orchestra, Barry McKinley, the Kidoodlers & Randall Sisters	March 23	filmed June 1939
Matty Malneck and His Orchestra	Matty Malneck, George Amy	April 5 (preview)	
Ozzie Nelson & His Orchestra	Roy Mack (director); Ozzie Nelson	June 29	filmed July 1939; Warner Bros. Big Band, Jazz & Swing Shorts (Warner Archive) & Torrid Zone DVD
Woody Herman and His Orchestra	Roy Mack (director); Woody Herman, Lee Wiley, Hal & Honey Abbott, Marie Hartman & Reed Brown Jr.	July 27	filmed February 1939; Warner Bros. Big Band, Jazz & Swing Shorts (Warner Archive) DVD
Jan Garber and His Orchestra	Jean Negulesco (director); Jan Garber	August 31	
Joe Reichman and His Orchestra	Jean Negulesco (director)	October 26	
Henry Busse and His Orchestra	Jean Negulesco (director); Henry Busse	November 30	Warner Bros. Big Band, Jazz & Swing Shorts (Warner Archive) & Brother Orchid DVD

=== 1941 ===
Title	Major credits	Release or copyright date	Notes
Skinnay Ennis and His Orchestra	Jean Negulesco (director); Skinnay Ennis	January 4	Warner Bros. Big Band, Jazz & Swing Shorts (Warner Archive) DVD
Cliff Edwards and His Buckaroos	Jean Negulesco (director); Cliff Edwards	March 8	Warner Bros. Big Band, Jazz & Swing Shorts (Warner Archive) DVD
Freddie Martin and His Orchestra	Jean Negulesco (director); Freddie Martin	April 12	
Marie Green and Her Merry Men	Jean Negulesco (director)	April 26	
Hal Kemp and His Orchestra	Jean Negulesco (director); Hal Kemp, Bob Allen & Maxine Grey	June 14	Warner Bros. Big Band, Jazz & Swing Shorts (Warner Archive) DVD
Glen Gray and the Casa Loma Orchestra	Jean Negulesco (director); Glen Gray	August 12	Warner Bros. Big Band, Jazz & Swing Shorts (Warner Archive) DVD
Carl Roff and His Orchestra (Carl Hoff and Band)	Jean Negulesco (director)	August 16	
Those Good Old Days	Jean Negulesco (director)	August 16	
University of Southern California Band and Glee Club	Jean Negulesco (director)	September 13	
Carioca Serenaders (The Serenaders)	Jean Negulesco (director);; music: Howard Jackson; Humberto Herrere & Band	October 25	
Forty Boys and a Song	Irving Allen (director); Robert Mitchell's Boy Choir	December 6	Nominee for Academy Award for Best Live Action Short Film. Available on The Bride Came C.O.D. DVD
Leo Reisman and His Orchestra	Jean Negulesco (director); Leo Reisman	© December 24	
The Playgirls	Jean Negulesco (director); Cathy Lewis, Navy Blues Sextette & The Ryan sisters	© December 26	

=== 1942 ===
Title	Major credits	Release date	Notes
Richard Himber and Orchestra	Jean Negulesco (director); Richard Himber	April 11	
Don Cossack Chorus	Jean Negulesco (director); Serge Jaroff conducts	Apr 25	
Emil Coleman and His Orchestra	Jean Negulesco (director)	May 9	filmed June '41
The United States Army Air Force Band	Jean Negulesco (director); Alf Heiber	September 19	Desperate Journey DVD
Six Hits and a Miss	Jean Negulesco (director); Six Hits and a Miss	October 24	Warner Bros. Big Band, Jazz & Swing Shorts (Warner Archive) & The Man Who Came to Dinner DVD
United States Marine Band	Jean Negulesco (director); William Santelmann	November 14	Nominee for Academy Award for Best Live Action Short Film; available on Kings Row DVD
Borrah Minnevitch and His Harmonica School	Jean Negulesco (director); Borrah Minnevitch	December 26	Warner Bros. Big Band, Jazz & Swing Shorts (Warner Archive) & Desperate Journey DVD

=== 1943 ===
Title	Major credits	Release date	Notes
The United States Navy Band	Jean Negulesco (director); Charles Brendler	January 25	Thank Your Lucky Stars (film) DVD
Ozzie Nelson and His Orchestra	Jean Negulesco (director); Ozzie Nelson	March 27	Warner Bros. Big Band, Jazz & Swing Shorts (Warner Archive) DVD
The United States Army Band	Jean Negulesco (director); Thomas Darcy Jr.	April 17	This Is the Army DVD
The All-American Bands	Jean Negulesco (director);	May 22	recycles footage of Freddie Martin, Skinnay Ennis, Joe Reichman & Matty Malneck
Childhood Days	Jean Negulesco & Jack Scholl (directors); Diana Hale, The Alvarez Sisters & California Junior Symphony	June 5	
The United States Service Bands	Jean Negulesco (director)	July 24	Edge of Darkness (1943 film) DVD
Hit Parade of the Gay Nineties	Jean Negulesco (director); Jack Crosby	September 18	
Sweetheart Serenade	Jean Negulesco (director); Warren Douglas, Joyce Reynolds & others	October 23	
Cavalcade of the Dance with Veloz and Yolanda	Jean Negulesco (director); Veloz and Yolanda; narrator: Art Gilmore	November 20	Nominee for Academy Award for Best Live Action Short Film, on Action in the North Atlantic (Classic Legends Humphrey Bogart) DVD
Freddie Fisher and His Band	Jean Negulesco (director); Freddie Fisher (musician)	December 18	

=== 1944 ===
Title	Major credits	Release date	Notes
United States Merchant Marine Cadet Corps Band (Ted Weams & Merchant Marine)	Jean Negulesco (director); Ted Weems	January 29	
South American Sway	Jean Negulesco (director); recycled footage of Emil Coleman, Joe Reichman & Carl Roff's Serenaders	March 18	
The United States Coast Guard Band	Bobby Connolly (director); Rudy Vallee	April 15	Uncertain Glory DVD
Songs of the Range	Dick Foran (director); narrator: Knox Manning	June 24	
Junior Jive Bombers	LeRoy Prinz (director); music: William Lava	July 1	
All Star Melody Master	Jean Negulesco (director); recycled footage of Hal Kemp, Emil Coleman, Skinnay Ennis & David Rubinoff	July 29	Northern Pursuit DVD
Bob Wills and His Texas Playboys	LeRoy Prinz; Bob Wills	September 2	Warner Bros. Big Band, Jazz & Swing Shorts (Warner Archive) DVD
Listen to the Bands	LeRoy Prinz & Jean Negulesco (directors); recycled Glen Gray, Skinnay Ennis, Joe Reichman & Milt Britton Orchestras	October 7	
Harry Owens and His Royal Hawaiian Orchestra	Dave Gould (director); Harry Owens	November 4	
Sonny Dunham and His Orchestra	Arnold Albert & Jack Scholl (directors); Sonny Dunham, the Pied Pipers & Angela Greene	November 25	
Jammin' the Blues	Gjon Mili & Bob Burks (directors); Lester Young, Illinois Jacquet, Marie Bryant & Archie Savage	December 18	Nominee for Academy Award for Best Live Action Short Film, available on Warner Bros. Big Band, Jazz & Swing Shorts (Warner Archive), Blues in the Night (film) & Passage to Marseilles (Classic Legends Humphrey Bogart) DVD

=== 1945 ===
Title	Major credits	Release date	Notes
Rhythm of the Rhumba	LeRoy Prinz (director); Chuy Reyes, Antonio Triana, Lola Montez & Chinita Marin	January 27	
Musical Mexico	Jack Scholl (director); music: Howard Jackson; Pedro Vargas	March 24	
Circus Band	Jack Scholl (director)	May 5	
Bands Across the Sea (G.I. Jive)	narrator: Truman Bradley	June 2	
Yankee Doodle Daughters	Dave Gould (director); Rudy Vallee	July 21	
Spade Cooley: King of Western Swing	Jack Scholl (director); Spade Cooley	September 1	Warner Bros. Big Band, Jazz & Swing Shorts (Warner Archive) DVD
Here Come the Navy Bands	Dave Gould (director)	September 29	
Musical Novelties	Jack Scholl (director)	October 6	recycles footage from Vitaphone Gambols, Vitaphone Highlights & other 1930s shorts
Music of the Americas	Jack Scholl (director); Lyda Vendrell, Teddy Rodriguez & Phyllis	December 15	

=== 1946-1947 ===
Title	Major credits	Release or copyright date	Notes
Headline Bands	Jack Scholl & Lloyd French (director)	January 26, 1946	recycles footage of Larry Clinton, Woody Herman, Jimmy Dorsey & others
Jan Savitt and His Band	Jack Scholl (director); Jan Savitt, Bob Arthur, Shirley Van, Helen Warren & the Lipham Children	March 16, 1946	Warner Bros. Big Band, Jazz & Swing Shorts (Warner Archive) DVD
Rhythm on Ice	Jack Scholl (director); George Arnold, Corrine Church, the Brinckmann Sisters, the Cubettes & the Notables	April 20, 1946	
Dixieland Jamboree	Jack Scholl (director); music: Howard Jackson	May 11, 1946	recycles Cab Calloway & others
Musical Memories	Jack Scholl (director); Busby Berkeley numbers from the ‘30s	© June 29, 1946	
Enric Madriguera and His Orchestra (#2)	Lloyd French & Jack Scholl (directors); Enric Madriguera	August 10, 1946	
Desi Arnaz and His Orchestra	Jack Scholl (director); Desi Arnaz	October 12, 1946	Warner Bros. Big Band, Jazz & Swing Shorts (Warner Archive) & Night and Day (1946 film) DVD. Last Melody Master filmed, but not last released.
Melody of Youth	LeRoy Prinz (director); California Junior Symphony with Peter Merenblum	December 14, 1946	
Big Time Revue	music: William Lava	January 25, 1947	
Stan Kenton and His Orchestra	Jack Scholl (director); Stan Kenton	February 22, 1947	filmed December 1945; Warner Bros. Big Band, Jazz & Swing Shorts (Warner Archive) DVD
Vaudeville Revue	Saul Elkins (director) recycled Johnny Perkins, Radio Rubes & the Buccaneers	April 12, 1947	

== Memories from Melody Lane (filmed 1947) ==
Directed by Jack Scholl, narrated by Art Gilmore and featuring the Merry Makers as musical support.

- Let's Sing a Song from the Movies / July 17, 1947 (available on Romance on the High Seas Greatest Classic Legends Doris Day DVD)
- Let's Sing a Song of the West / September 27, 1947
- Let's Sing an Old Time Song / December 26, 1947
- Let's Sing a Song about the Moonlight / January 24, 1948 (available on On Moonlight Bay (film) DVD)
- Let's Sing a Stephen Foster Song / May 8, 1948
- Let's Sing Grandfather's Favorites / August 8, 1948

== Hit Parade of the Gay Nineties (filmed 1950) ==
Directed by Jack Scholl

- When Grandpa Was a Boy / October 7, 1950
- The Old Family Album / December 16, 1950
- In Old New York / May 15, 1951
- Musical Memories / June 30, 1951

== See also ==
- Vitaphone Varieties
- List of short subjects by Hollywood studio § Warner Brothers

== Links ==
- Melody Masters listed on the IMDb.com
- "Film Daily archives". The Online Books Page.
- NPR DVD review of Warner Bros. Big Band, Jazz & Swing Shorts
