= Big V Comedies =

Comedy short film series

The Big V Comedies (also known as “Vitaphone Comedies”) were two-reel (17 to 20 minute long) comedy film shorts produced by Warner Bros. and Vitaphone between 1931 and 1938, contemporary of the more famous Hal Roach, Mack Sennett and Columbia Pictures comedies.

== Overview ==
Most of these Warner short subjects were filmed at the Brooklyn, New York facilities, but a few 1935 titles handled by Ralph Staub were done in Hollywood, including the classic Keystone Hotel. (This was a similar situation with the contemporary Educational Pictures, which also made its film shorts in both New York and Hollywood during the same period.) Samuel Sax was often producer in charge.

Among the most famous of these were the very last films starring Fatty Arbuckle, along with vintage screen appearances of Shemp Howard of Three Stooges fame and Bob Hope before his big break in features and radio. One mini-series, dubbed “Girlfriends Comedies” featured Thelma White and Fanny Watson.

The production standards were usually first rate (since the same company made the popular Broadway Brevities and Melody Masters), but the success of an individual film depended on both the talent of the performers and the writers involved. Also many titles were filmed indoors with fewer outdoor action scenes than many California produced comedy shorts.

The name “Big V” was used rather loosely in the trade periodicals, with later logos “Vitaphone Comedy” and “Vitaphone Gay-ety” (for the more musical product) alternating as substitute names in the later years. Some titles were given alternative series names by Motion Picture Herald as “Big Star Comedies” or simply “2-reel comedies”.

The studio stopped making two-reel comedies in 1938, the same year that Hal Roach sold his Our Gang series to MGM and 20th Century Fox stopped distributing the Educational product. Apart from an occasional special, the Looney Tunes and Merrie Melodies supplied much of the comedy before the Warner feature attraction, until the Joe McDoakes series began in the 1940s.

== List of titles ==
Below is a listing arranged by year of release with title listed first, followed by major credits, release date (and sometimes Film Daily review or copyright date) and DVD availability (some on sets put out by the Warner Archive Collection).

=== 1931 ===
| Title | Director & performers | Release or review date | Notes |
|---|---|---|---|
| The Meal Ticket | Al Ray (director); Jack Pearl, Peggy Shannon & Claire Trevor | June 7 (Film Daily review) | |
| Success | Alfred J. Goulding (director); Fred Allen (writer); Jack Haley, Helen Lynd & John Hamilton | July | Vitaphone Varieties Vol. 2 (Warner Archive) DVD |
| The Silent Partner | Roy Mack (director), Rupert Hughes (writer); William Gaxton, Frank McGlynn, Shirley Palmer, Roger Gray, Detmar Poppen & Winifred Harris | August 2 (Film Daily review) | |
| Where Men Are Men | Alfred J. Goulding (director); Joe Penner | September 20 | |
| Rough Sailing | Alfred J. Goulding (director); Joe Penner | September 27 (Film Daily review) | |
| Lucky 13 | Alfred J. Goulding (director); Thelma White & Fanny Watson | October 4 (Film Daily review) | Girlfriends Comedy |
| The Smart Set-Up | Roy Mack (director) & Burnet Hershey (writer); Walter O'Keefe & Margaret Lee | November 1 | "Big Star Comedy" Smart Money (1931 film) (Greatest Gangster Films Prohibition Era) DVD |
| Of All People | Alfred J. Goulding (director); Thelma White & Fanny Watson | November 15 (Film Daily review) | Girlfriends Comedy |
| Her Wedding Nightmare | Alfred J. Goulding (director); Thelma White & Fanny Watson | December 27 (Film Daily review) | Girlfriends Comedy |

=== 1932 ===
| Title | Director & performers | Release, copyright or review date | Notes |
|---|---|---|---|
| Shake a Leg | Thelma White & Fanny Watson | February 21 | Girlfriends Comedy |
| Poor but Dishonest | Alfred J. Goulding (director); Thelma White & Fanny Watson, Al Klein, James C. Morton & Jessie Busley | March 1932 | Girlfriends Comedy |
| The Perfect Suitor | Benny Rubin, Warren Hymer & Marjorie Hines (Margie Hines) | March 20 (Film Daily review) | "Big Star Comedy" |
| Maybe I'm Wrong | Roy Mack (director); Richy Craig Jr., Frank Allenworth & others | March 27 (Film Daily review) | "Big Star Comedy" |
| The Toreador | Alfred J. Goulding (director); Joe Penner, Paul Guilfoyle, Julie Chandler, Dudley Hawley & Frances McHugh | April 17 | "Big Star Comedy" |
| On Edge | Alfred J. Goulding (director); William & Joe Mandel | April 24 (Film Daily review) | "Big Star Comedy" |
| In The Family | Alfred J. Goulding (director); Thelma White & Fanny Watson | July 2 (Film Daily review) | Girlfriends Comedy |
| Sherlock's Home | Alfred J. Goulding (director); Jack Haley, June O'Dea, Anthony Hughes & Herschel Mayall | September 10 | |
| Here, Prince | Joseph Henabery (director); Joe Penner, Joan Castle, Dan Coleman & Margaret Dumont | October 1 | |
| You Call It Madness | Alfred J. Goulding (director); Richy Craig, Earl Gilbert, Frank McNellis & Walter Wilson | October 10 | |
| Hey, Pop! | Alfred J. Goulding (director); Fatty Arbuckle, Dan Wolheim, Billy Hayes & Herschel Mayall | October 15 | Vitaphone Comedy Collection Vol. 1 (Warner Archive) DVD |
| Then Came the Yawn | Joseph Henabery (director); Jack Haley, Christine Maple & John Hamilton | November 26 | |
| The Run Around | William Demarest, Jackie Kelk, Eleanor Phelps, Joe Lyons & Hal Clarendon | © December 10 | |

=== 1933 ===
| Title | Director & performers | Release, copyright or review date | Notes |
|---|---|---|---|
| Trouble Indemnity | Alfred J. Goulding (director); Frank Orth, Ann Codee, Jesse Busley & Marie Marion | January 17 (Film Daily review) | |
| The Build Up | Alfred J. Goulding (director); Jack Haley, Helen Lynd, Don Rowan & Ed Jerome | January 19 (Film Daily review) | |
| Buzzin' Around | Alfred J. Goulding (director); Jack Henley (writer); Fatty Arbuckle, Al St. John, Dan Coleman, Alice May Tick, Tom Smith & Al Ochs | © February 4 | Vitaphone Comedy Collection Vol. 1 (Warner Archive) DVD |
| Nothing Ever Happens | Roy Mack (director); George Givot, Jane Gale & others | March 1 | Grand Hotel DVD |
| Wrongorilla | Alfred J. Goulding (director); Jack Haley, Harry Shannon, Joan Castle & Victor Kilian | © March 4 | |
| An Idle Roomer | Alfred J. Goulding (director); Jack Haley, Blossom MacDonald (Blossom Rock), Emily Lowry & Lou Lubin | April 29 | |
| How've You Bean? | Alfred J. Goulding (director); Jack Henley (writer); Fatty Arbuckle, Fritz Hubert, Jean Hubert & Mildred van Dorn | © June 24 | Vitaphone Comedy Collection Vol. 1 (Warner Archive) DVD |
| Nothing But the Tooth | Joseph Henabery (director); Jack Haley, Mildred van Dorn, Chester Clute & Jackie Kelk | © August 3 | |
| Salt Water Daffy | Ray McCarey (director); Jack Haley, Shemp Howard, Charles Judels & Lionel Stander | © September 16 | Vitaphone Comedy Collection Vol. 1 (Warner Archive) DVD |
| Close Relations | Ray McCarey (director); Fatty Arbuckle, Shemp Howard, Charles Judels, Harry Shannon, Hugh O’Connell & Mildred van Dorn | © September 30 | Vitaphone Comedy Collection Vol. 1 (Warner Archive) DVD |
| Gobs Of Fun | Ray McCarey (director) George Givot, Charles Judels, Olive Borden & Toney Hughes | © October 11 | Vitaphone Comedy Collection Vol. 2 (Warner Archive) DVD |
| Turkey in the Raw | Joseph Henabery (director); Gus Shy, Fritz Hubert, Al Ochs & Helen Goodhue | © November 9 | |
| In the Dough | Ray McCarey (director); Jack Henley (writer); Fatty Arbuckle, Shemp Howard, Lionel Stander & Ralph Sanford | © November 15 | Vitaphone Comedy Collection Vol. 1 (Warner Archive) DVD |
| Here Comes Flossie | Ray McCarey (director); Ben Blue, Janet Reade, Shemp Howard & Paul Everton | © December 9 | Vitaphone Comedy Collection Vol. 1 (Warner Archive) DVD |
| Tomalio | Ray McCarey (director); Jack Henley (writer); Fatty Arbuckle, Charles Judels, Fritz Hubert, Jerry Bergen & Phyllis Holden | December 30 | Vitaphone Comedy Collection Vol. 1 (Warner Archive) DVD |

=== 1934 ===
| Title | Director & performers | Release, copyright or review date | Notes |
|---|---|---|---|
| Howd' Ya Like That? | Ray McCarey (director); George Givot, Charles Judels, Donald McBride, Lionel Stander & Philip Loeb | © January 13 | Vitaphone Comedy Collection Vol. 1 (Warner Archive) DVD |
| Nervous Hands | Ralph Staub (director); Ben Blue & Donald MacBride | © January 29 | |
| Mushrooms | Ralph Staub (director); Harry Gribbon, Lionel Stander, Cora Witherspoon, Shemp Howard & Russell Hicks | © February 14 | Vitaphone Comedy Collection Vol. 1 (Warner Archive) DVD |
| Pugs and Kisses | Ray McCarey (director); Charles Judels, Lionel Stander, Greta Granstedt, Shemp Howard & Ralph Sanford | © February 17 | Vitaphone Comedy Collection Vol. 1 (Warner Archive) DVD |
| Foiled Again | Ralph Staub (director); Ben Blue, Sybil Burns, Robert Malcolm & Russell Hicks | © March 20 | |
| Very Close Veins | Ralph Staub (director); Ben Blue, Dorothy Dare, Shemp Howard, Herb Warren & June East | © April 14 | Vitaphone Comedy Collection Vol. 1 (Warner Archive) DVD |
| Corn On The Cop | Ralph Staub (director); Harry Gribbon, Shemp Howard, Mary Doran & Boyd Davis | © April 28 | Vitaphone Comedy Collection Vol. 1 (Warner Archive) DVD |
| I Scream | Ray McCarey (director); Gus Shy, Shemp Howard, Curtis Karpe & Lionel Stander | © May 19 | Vitaphone Comedy Collection Vol. 1 (Warner Archive) DVD |
| Art Trouble | Ralph Staub (director); Jack Henley (writer); Harry Gribbon, Shemp Howard, Gertrude Mudge, Beatrice Blinn & James Stewart | © June 23 | Vitaphone Comedy Collection Vol. 1 (Warner Archive) DVD |
| My Mummy's Arms | Ralph Staub (director); Russell Hicks, Harry Gribbon & Shemp Howard | © June 28 | Vitaphone Comedy Collection Vol. 2 (Warner Archive) DVD |
| The Prize Sap | Ralph Staub (director); Ben Blue, Hugh Cameron, Dorothy Brown & Cora Witherspoon | © July 21 | |
| Daredevil O'Dare | Lloyd French (director); Ben Blue, Shemp Howard, Vicki Cummings, Milton Frome & Maude Odell | © August 3 | Vitaphone Comedy Collection Vol. 2 (Warner Archive) DVD |
| Oh Sailor Behave | Ralph Staub (director); El Brendel & William Carey with Gordon Westcott, Doris Arkinson, Mary Forbes & Vivien Oakland | September 1 | |
| Radio Scout | Ralph Staub (director); El Brendel, Joan Wheeler, Bob Nolan & others | September 1 | |
| All Sealed Up | Lloyd French (director); Ben Blue, Fred Harper, Louise Troxell, Harry Shannon & Lionel Stander | © September 13 | |
| Salted Peanuts | Ralph Staub (director); George Givot & Charles Judels | © October 9 | |
| Smoked Hams | Lloyd French (director); Shemp Howard & Daphne Pollard | © October 20 | Vitaphone Comedy Collection Vol. 2 (Warner Archive) DVD |
| High, Wide and Hansom | Lloyd French (director); Jack Henley (writer); Herb Williams, Leona Powers & Frank Otto | November 5 | |
| So You Won't T-t-t-talk | Lloyd French (director); Roscoe Ates, Shemp Howard, Donald MacBride, Jackie Kelk & Ruth Gillette | © November 24 | Vitaphone Comedy Collection Vol. 2 (Warner Archive) DVD |
| Dizzy And Daffy | Lloyd French (director); Jerome & Paul Dean, Roscoe Ates, Shemp Howard & others | November 30 (Film Daily review) | Vitaphone Comedy Collection Vol. 2 (Warner Archive) DVD |

=== 1935 ===
| Title | Director & performers | Release, copyright or review date | Notes |
|---|---|---|---|
| Out Of Order | Lloyd French (director); Ben Blue, Donald MacBride & Frances McHugh | © January 19 | |
| Vacation Daze | Ralph Staub (director); Hobart Cavanaugh, Mary Treen, Jack Norton & others | © February 9 | |
| A Peach of a Pair | Lloyd French (director); Daphne Pollard & Shemp Howard | © February 12 | Vitaphone Comedy Collection Vol. 2 (Warner Archive) DVD |
| His First Flame | Lloyd French (director); Daphne Pollard, John Sheehan, Fred Harper & Shemp Howard | March 9 | Vitaphone Comedy Collection Vol. 2 (Warner Archive) DVD |
| Once Over Lightly | Lloyd French (director); Roscoe Ates, Loretta Sayers & Donald MacBride | © March 25 | |
| Why Pay Rent? | Lloyd French (director); Shemp Howard, Roscoe Ates, Ethel Sykes, Billie Leonard & Dickie Wallace | May 4 | Vitaphone Comedy Collection Vol. 2 (Warner Archive) DVD |
| Pretty Polly | Lloyd French (director); Polly Moran, Marjorie Main, Jane Gale, David Burns, Pats Flick and Ginger Pearson | June 1 | |
| Serves You Right | Lloyd French (director); Shemp Howard, Nell O’Day, Donald MacBride & Horace McMahon | June 15 | Vitaphone Comedy Collection Vol. 2 (Warner Archive) DVD |
| On The Wagon | Lloyd French (director); Shemp Howard, Roscoe Ates, Gertrude Madge, Lillian Pertka & Zeni Vatori | July 1 | Vitaphone Comedy Collection Vol. 2 (Warner Archive) DVD |
| Get Rich Quick | Ralph Staub (director); Allen Jenkins, Eddie Shubert, Mary Treen & Herman Bing | © July 6 | completed August 1934 |
| Husband's Holiday | Ralph Staub (director); music: Howard Jackson; Hobart Cavanaugh, Mary Treen, the Canovas, Jack Norton & Billy Barty | July 6 | |
| The Vodka Boatmen | Lloyd French (director); The Yacht Club Boys, Gertrude Madge & Nancy Evans | August 7 (Film Daily review) | |
| Watch the Birdie | Lloyd French (director); Bob Hope, Nell O’Day, Arline Dinitz, George Watts | August 10 | Top Hat (Greatest Classic Films Astaire & Rogers 1) DVD |
| Keystone Hotel | Ralph Staub (director); Joe Traub (writer); music: Howard Jackson; Ben Turpin, Hank Mann, Chester Conklin, Ford Sterling, Marie Prevost, Vivien Oakland, Jack Duffy, Bert Roach | August 24 | |
| The Officer's Mess | Lloyd French (director); Shemp Howard, Louise Squires, Horace MacMahon, Charles Kemper & Dermar Poppen | October 19 | Vitaphone Comedy Collection Vol. 2 (Warner Archive) DVD |
| Lonesome Trailer | Ralph Staub (director); Joe Traub (writer); music: Howard Jackson; El Brendel, Edna Bennett, Eddie Schubert & Mary Treen | October 26 | |
| The Old Grey Mayor | Lloyd French (director); Bob Hope, Lionel Stander, Ruth Hall, George Watts & Sam Wren | © November 2 | G Men DVD |
| Double Exposure | Lloyd French (director); Bob Hope, Jules Epailly, Johnny Berkes & Loretta Sayers | November 23 | Gold Diggers of 1935 DVD |
| The Lucky Swede | Ralph Staub (director); music: Howard Jackson; El Brendel & Helen Ericson | December 4 | |

=== 1936 ===
| Title | Director & performers | Release, copyright or review date | Notes |
|---|---|---|---|
| When the Cat's Away | Lloyd French (director); Shemp Howard, Johnny Berkes, Anita Garvin & Jean Cleveland | January 4 | Vitaphone Comedy Collection Vol. 2 (Warner Archive) DVD |
| Shop Talk | Lloyd French (director); Bob Hope, Johnny Berkes & Richard Lane | © February 14 | The Charge of the Light Brigade (1936 film) DVD |
| Slide, Nellie, Slide | Murray Roth (director); Herman Bing, Paula Stone, Al Shean & Marie Wilson | © February 17 | |
| Calling All Tars | Lloyd French (director); Bob Hope, Johnny Berkes, Oscar Ragland | March 25 | Critic's Choice (film) DVD |
| Absorbing Junior | Lloyd French (director); Shemp Howard, Johnny Berkes, Gertrude Madge, Gerie Worthing, Arthur & Morton Havel & Kenneth Lundy | April 25 | Vitaphone Comedy Collection Vol. 2 (Warner Archive) DVD |
| The Wife of the Party | Lloyd French (director); Ken Murray, Sassafras, George Watts, Peggy O'Donnell & Donald MacBride | June 12 | |
| The Oily Bird | Lloyd French (director); Ken Murray, Oswald, Charles Withers & Harvey Moffat | July 25 | Vitaphone Comedy |
| The Good Old Plumbertime | Lloyd French (director); Johnny Berkes, Hugh Cameron, Loretta Sayers, Grace Worth and Donald MacBride | © August 24 | |
| The Lyin' Tamer | George Jessel | August 29 | Vitaphone Gay-ety |
| Dough-Nuts | Lloyd French (director); The Yacht Club Boys, Virginia McNaughton, Johnny Berkes & Jules Epailly | November 14 | Vitaphone Comedy |

=== 1937 ===
| Title | Director & performers | Release or copyright date | Notes |
|---|---|---|---|
| Toot Sweet | Roy Mack (director); Fifi D'Orsay & Rufe Davis | © August 3 | Vitaphone Gay-ety |
| Doctor Cupid | Lloyd French (director); Ken Murray & Oswald, Gertrude Mudge, Dorothy Edwards & Phyllis Crane | September 4 | Vitaphone Comedy |
| One on the House | Lloyd French (director); Ted, Judd & Joe McMichael | December 18 | Vitaphone Gay-ety |
| Under the Wire | Lloyd French (director); Joe & Asbestos, Harry Gribbon, Eddie White & Phil Silvers | © December 21 | Vitaphone Comedy |
| Wedding Yells | Lloyd French (director); music: William Lava; Ken Murray, Oswald, Jeanne Kelly, Milton Charleston & Regina Wallace | December 28 | Vitaphone Comedy |

=== 1938 ===
| Title | Director & performers | Release date | Notes |
|---|---|---|---|
| Waiting Around | Lloyd French (director); Frank Libuse, Jimmy Shay, Gus Raymond, Margo Brandon & the Stanley Twins | February 26 | Vitaphone Gay-ety |
| Hold That Ball | Lloyd French (director); the Preisser Sisters, Bobby Pinkus, Thurston Crane | April 23 | Vitaphone Gay-ety |
| Stocks and Blondes | Lloyd French (director); Gene Lockhart, Kathleen Lockhart, Richard Bishop, Marie Hartman & Butler Hixon | May 21 | Vitaphone Comedy |
| Rise and Sing | Roy Mack (director); Alan Cross & Henry Dunn | June 25 | Vitaphone Gay-ety |
| My Pop | Lloyd French (director); Henry Armetta, Harry Burns, Anita Simpson & Claire Carleton | July 16 | Vitaphone Comedy |
| There Goes the Bride | Roy Mack (director); Fifi D'Orsay & 4 McNally Sisters | August 27 | Vitaphone Gay-ety |

== See also ==
- List of short subjects by Hollywood studio#Warner Bros.

== Links ==
- "Film Daily archives". The Online Books Page.
- DVD Talk review of Vitaphone Comedy Collection Volume 1
- DVD Talk review of Vitaphone Comedy Collection Volume 2
