= Wiedoeft =

Wiedoeft is a surname. Notable people with the surname include:

- Herb Wiedoeft (1886–1928), German-American band leader
- Rudy Wiedoeft (1893–1940), American saxophonist
