= Midnight Patrol =

Midnight Patrol may refer to:

- The Midnight Patrol (1932 film), 1932 American drama film directed by Christy Cabanne
- The Midnight Patrol, 1933 American comedy film starring Laurel and Hardy
- Midnight Patrol: Adventures in the Dream Zone, a 1990 British-American animated series
