= Nowe Castle =

Castle in Poland

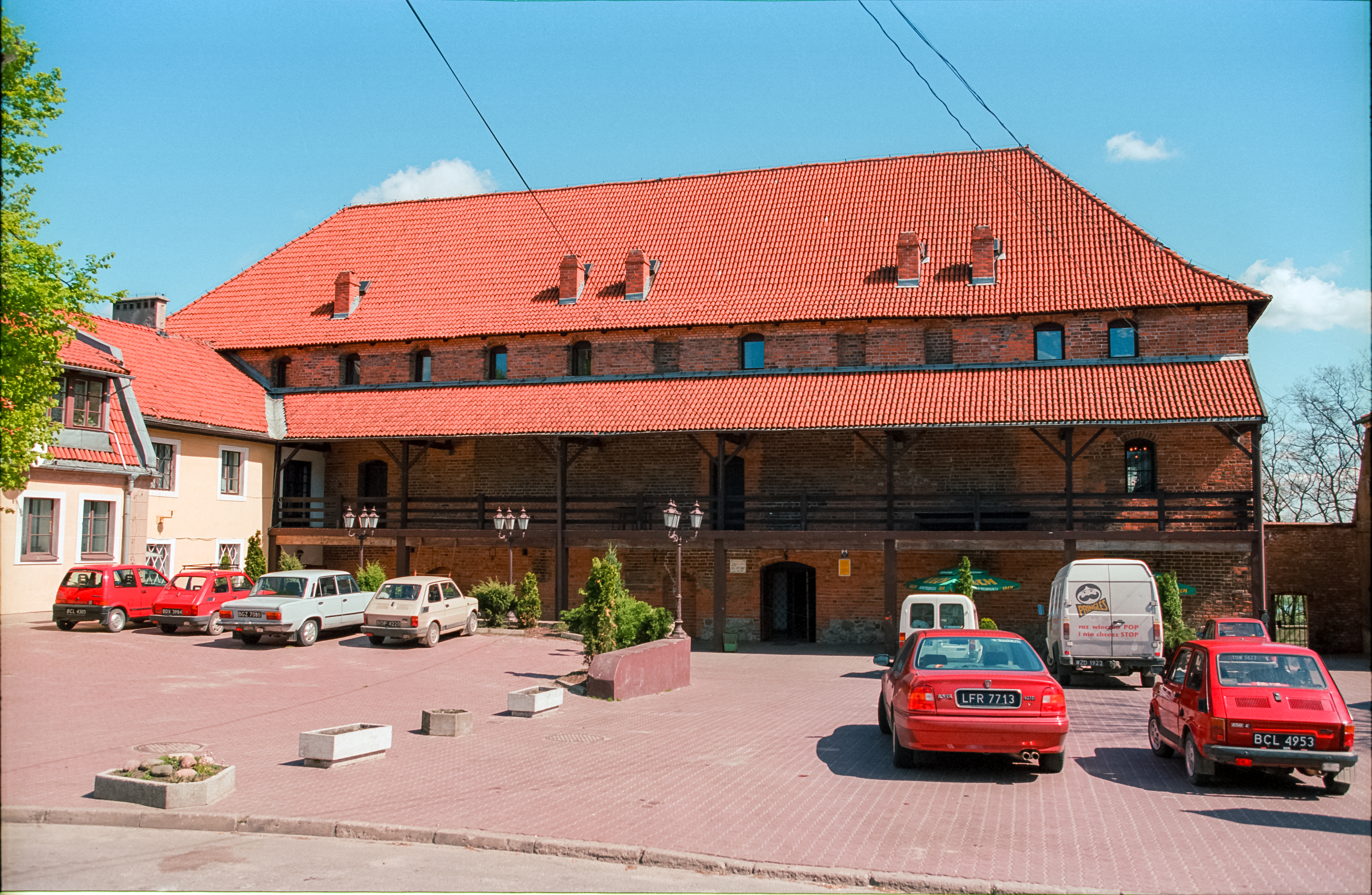
- Nowe Castle

- Location of the Nowe Castle in Poland Nowe Castle (Kuyavian-Pomeranian Voivodeship)
- 53°38′46″N 18°43′51″E
- Location: Nowe, Poland

History
- Built: 1326-1335

Site notes
- Architectural style: Gothic

Nowe Castle (Polish: Zamek w Nowem, German: Burg Neuenburg) is a medieval castle in Nowe, Poland, located on the bank of the River Vistula by the Castle Square.

The castle was constructed in the second half of the fourteenth century, by the Teutonic Order for the Pomeranian castellans. The castle is located by the north-eastern part of Nowe. After 1465, the castle housed the residence of the Starosta of the House of Nowskiscy, the castle was largely destroyed by the Swedes during the Deluge. After the First Partition of Poland in 1787, Prussian authorities partially deconstructed the castle, but kept the main wing which was converted into an Evangelical Protestant Church. In the next century the castle was used as a warehouse and fire station. In the 1970s, the castle was renovated, the works finished in the year of 1992. Currently, the castle houses the Castle Centre of Culture (Centrum Kultury "Zamek").
