= Barry Wood (singer) =

American singer and producer (1909–1970)

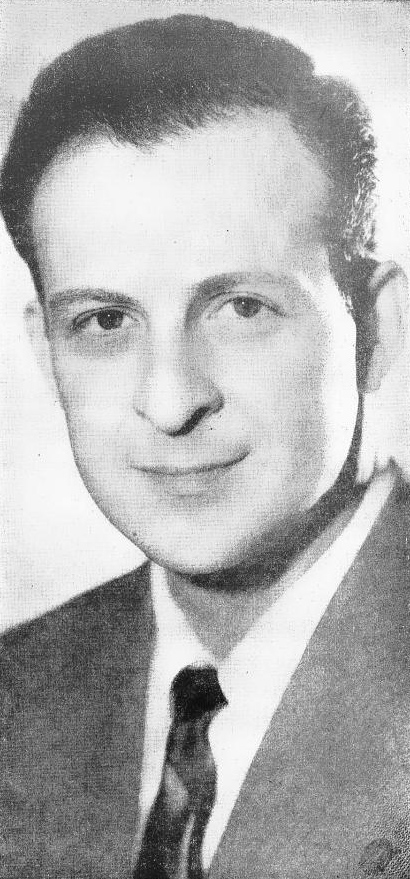
- Wood in a 1943 publication
- Born: Louis Rappaport; February 12, 1909; New Haven, Connecticut, U.S.
- Died: July 19, 1970 (aged 61); Miami Beach, Florida, U.S.
- Education: Yale University
- Relatives: Barney Rapp (brother)

Barry Wood (born Louis Rappaport; February 12, 1909 – July 19, 1970) was an American singer and television producer. He is best known for being Frank Sinatra's immediate predecessor as the lead male vocalist on the long running NBC radio program Your Hit Parade.

== Biography ==
Born on February 12, 1909, in New Haven, Connecticut, Wood was the younger brother of bandleader Barney Rapp. He attended Yale (where he swam and played water polo). He was a sideman for Buddy Rogers's band. He left Rogers to become a singer, and he eventually signed on at Your Hit Parade, where he maintained his popularity for several years and was promoted as the nation's "sweater boy" (a counterpart to the sweater girl pin-ups popular in the World War II era).

Wood was identified with several popular wartime songs. In 1941 he introduced and recorded Irving Berlin's "Any Bonds Today?" and "Arms for the Love of America". In 1942, recording as Barry Wood and the Wood Nymphs, he had a hit with "We Did It Before (And We Can Do It Again)", written by Charles Tobias and Cliff Friend; this song became a popular wartime anthem, and was later used in a number of Warner Bros. Looney Tunes cartoons. Another notable song he recorded for a war bond drive was called "Ev'rybody Ev'ry Payday", written by Tom Adair and Dick Uhl, and heavily promoted by the radio division of the United States Treasury to encourage workers to purchase bonds through payroll deductions.

According to music critic Will Friedwald, Wood had "an interesting voice, gray and appropriately woody", and a "sort of robust charm", but "his super-stiff rhythm makes him tough to listen to today."

Sinatra replaced Wood on Your Hit Parade in 1943. Wood had his own show on NBC from 1943 to 1945, first called The Million Dollar Band and then (with Patsy Kelly as co-star) the Palmolive Party. In 1948, his quarter-hour radio program, Barry Wood Show, was syndicated by Frederick Ziv via electrical transcription.

He later became a television producer. His producing credits included Kate Smith's show, Wide Wide World, and The Bell Telephone Hour. He died in Miami Beach, Florida, in 1970.

In 1948 and 1949, Wood hosted and produced Places Please, a three-nights-a-week variety TV show on CBS.
