= Nowe =

Town in Poland

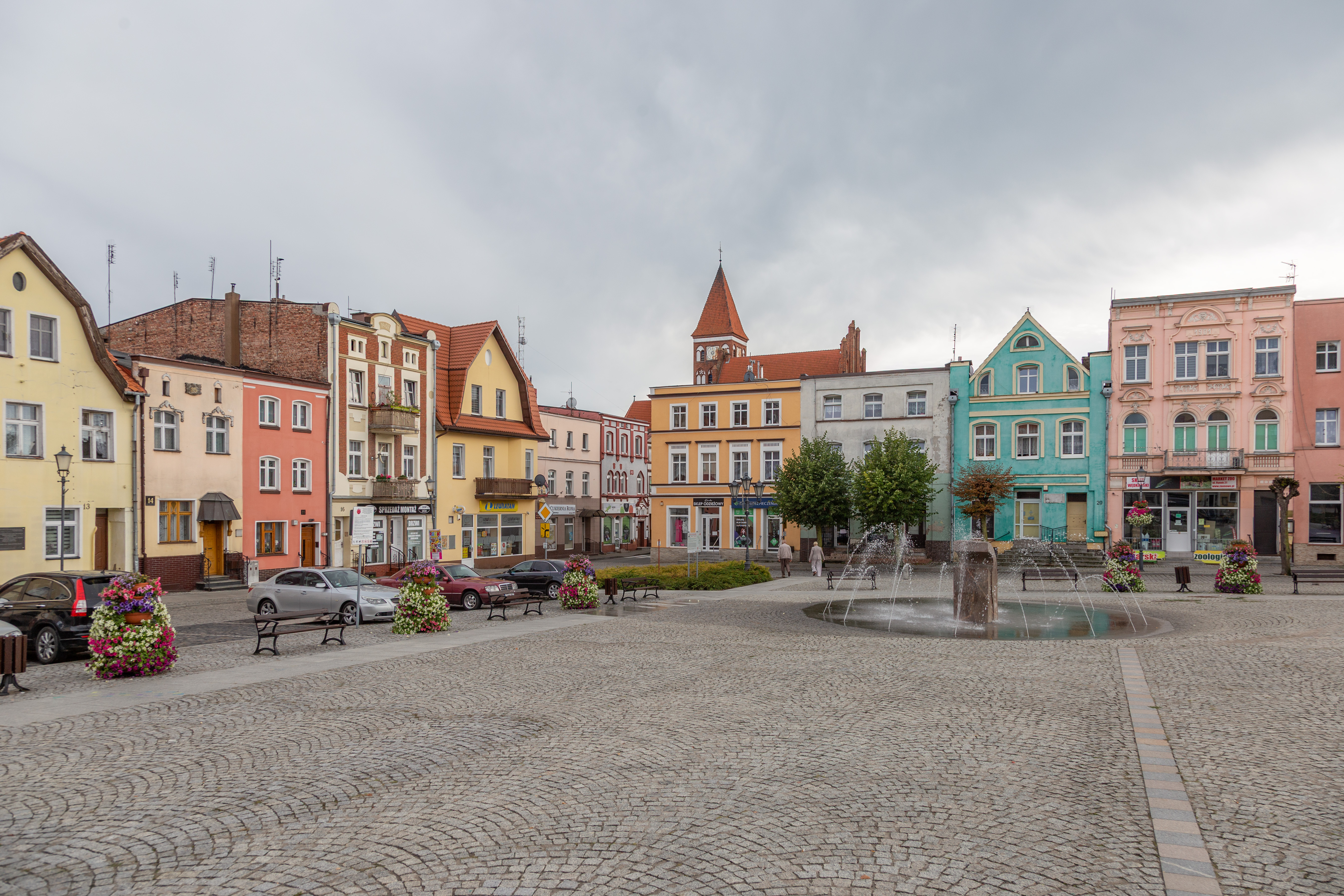
- Rynek (Market Square)

- Flag Coat of arms

- Location within Poland
- Coordinates: 53°38′58″N 18°43′32″E
- Country: Poland
- Voivodeship: Kuyavian-Pomeranian
- County: Świecie
- Gmina: Nowe

Government
  - Mayor: Czesław Woliński

Area
  - Total: 3.57 km^{2} (1.38 sq mi)

Population (2006)
  - Total: 6,252
  - Density: 1,750/km^{2} (4,540/sq mi)
- Time zone: UTC+1 (CET)
  - Summer (DST): UTC+2 (CEST)
- Postal code: 86-170
- Vehicle registration: CSW

Nowe [ˈnɔvɛ] (German: Neuenburg in Westpreußen, 1942-1945: Neuenburg (Weichsel)) is a town in Świecie County, Kuyavian-Pomeranian Voivodeship, in northern Poland, with 6,270 inhabitants (2004). Founded in the Middle Ages, Nowe is a former royal town of Poland, and features a preserved old town with several medieval Gothic churches and a castle.

== Geographical location ==
Nowe is located approximately 75 kilometers north-east of Bydgoszcz and 80 kilometers south of Gdańsk in an elevated position on the river Vistula. It is located within the ethnocultural region of Kociewie in the historic region of Gdańsk Pomerania.

== History ==
=== Early history ===
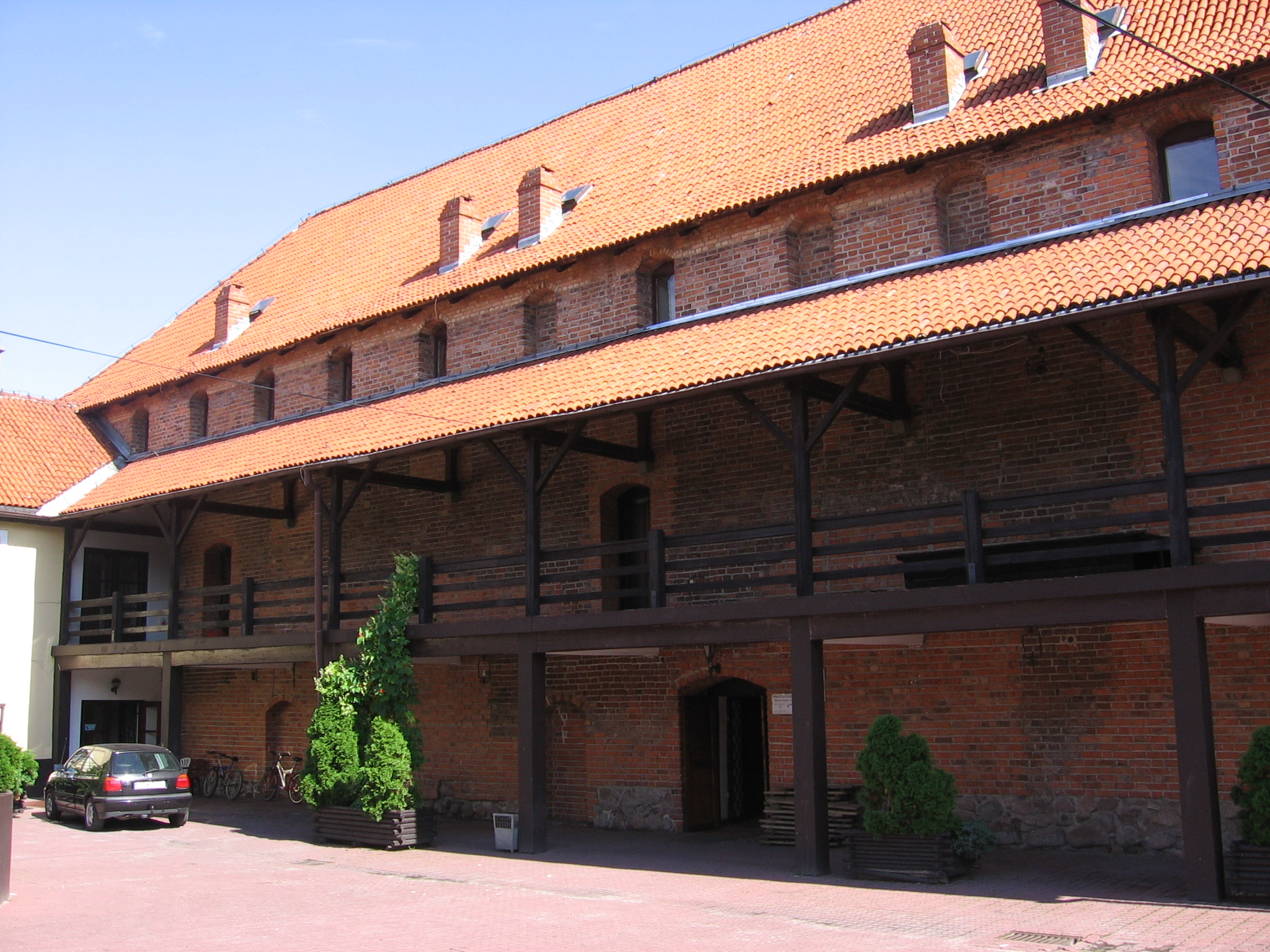
Main wing of the Nowe Castle, which currently houses the Culture Centre

The medieval name of the town was Novo Castro, or Nowy Gród in Polish. The town was founded in 1185 by Sobieslaw I, Duke of Pomerania. In 1266 the settlement is mentioned as a fortess place. In 1282 the Franciscan friars settled down here. It was part of the medieval Kingdom of Poland. In 1301 King Wenceslaus II of Poland granted the town to Piotr Swienca.

In 1308 the town was invaded, destroyed and later annexed by the Teutonic Knights. In 1350 it was granted new privileges, later confirmed by King Sigismund I the Old in 1528. Poles recaptured the town after the Battle of Grunwald in 1410, however, after the 1411 peace treaty it fell back to the Teutonic Knights.

In 1440 the town joined the Prussian Confederation, which opposed Teutonic rule, and upon the request of which King Casimir IV Jagiellon re-incorporated the territory to the Kingdom of Poland in 1454. During the subsequent Thirteen Years' War it was captured by the Teutonic Knights in 1458, besieged by Poles in August 1464, and the Teutonic Knights capitulated in February 1465, losing their last stronghold on the west bank of the Vistula. It was reintegrated with Poland, the castle became the seat of the local starosts and the next year the Teutonic Knights renounced any claims to the town. It was a royal town of the Kingdom of Poland, administratively located in the Pomeranian Voivodeship. In 1626 and 1655 Nowe was besieged by Sweden.

=== Late modern period ===
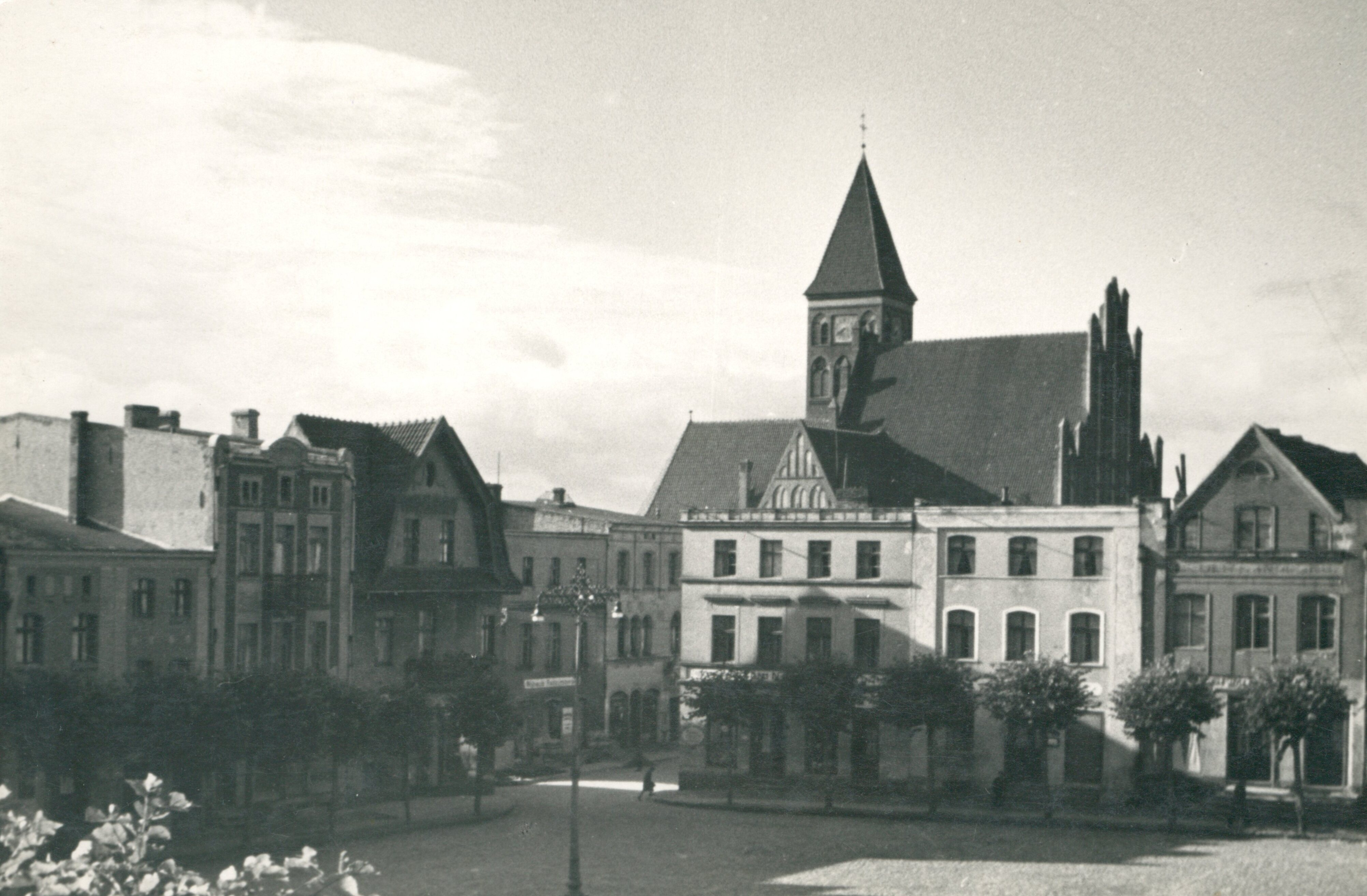
The market square and the former Franciscan church in the 1930s

In 1772, after the First Partition of Poland, the town, as Neuenburg, was annexed by the Kingdom of Prussia and was subject to Germanisation policies, however, in the late 19th century it was still mainly populated by Poles. In 1906–1907, local Polish children joined the children school strikes against Germanisation that spread throughout the Prussian Partition of Poland. From 1871 it formed part of Germany, within which it belonged to Kreis Schwetz in the administrative region of Regierungsbezirk Marienwerder in the Prussian Province of West Prussia. According to the German census of 1910, Neuenburg had a population of 5,152, of which 2,702 (52.45%) were German-speaking, 2,316 (44.95%) were Polish-speaking and 134 (2.6%) were bilingual. In 1920, after World War I, the town became part of the re-established Second Polish Republic as a result of the Treaty of Versailles and was part of the Pomeranian Voivodeship.

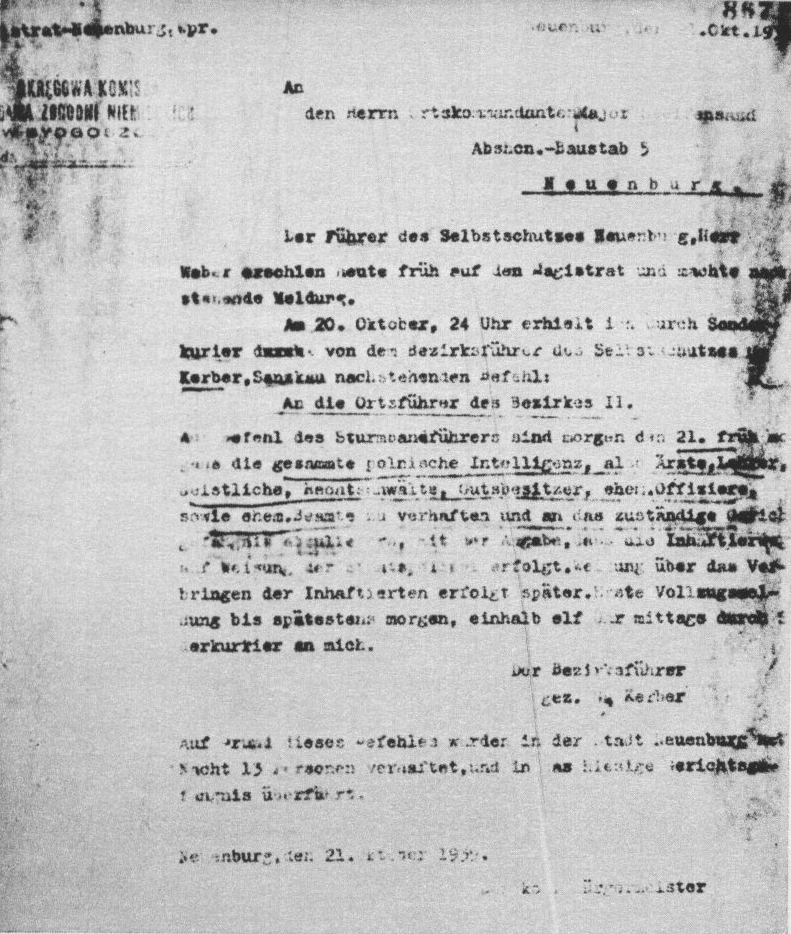
Arrest warrant for the Polish intelligentsia from Nowe, issued by the Bezirksführer (district commander) of the German Selbstschutz, G. Kerber, on 21 October 1939

After the German invasion of Poland, which started World War II in September 1939, it was occupied and annexed by Nazi Germany, into its newly formed province of Reichsgau Danzig-West Prussia. The Poles were subjected to mass arrests and executions as part of the Intelligenzaktion Pommern. The Germans established a prison in the local courthouse, in which around 200 Poles were imprisoned and tortured in September and October 1939, before being murdered in large massacres in the nearby village of Grupa. Towards the end of World War II, Nowe was captured by the Red Army and after the end of the war, it was restored to Poland.

Medieval Gothic churches in Nowe

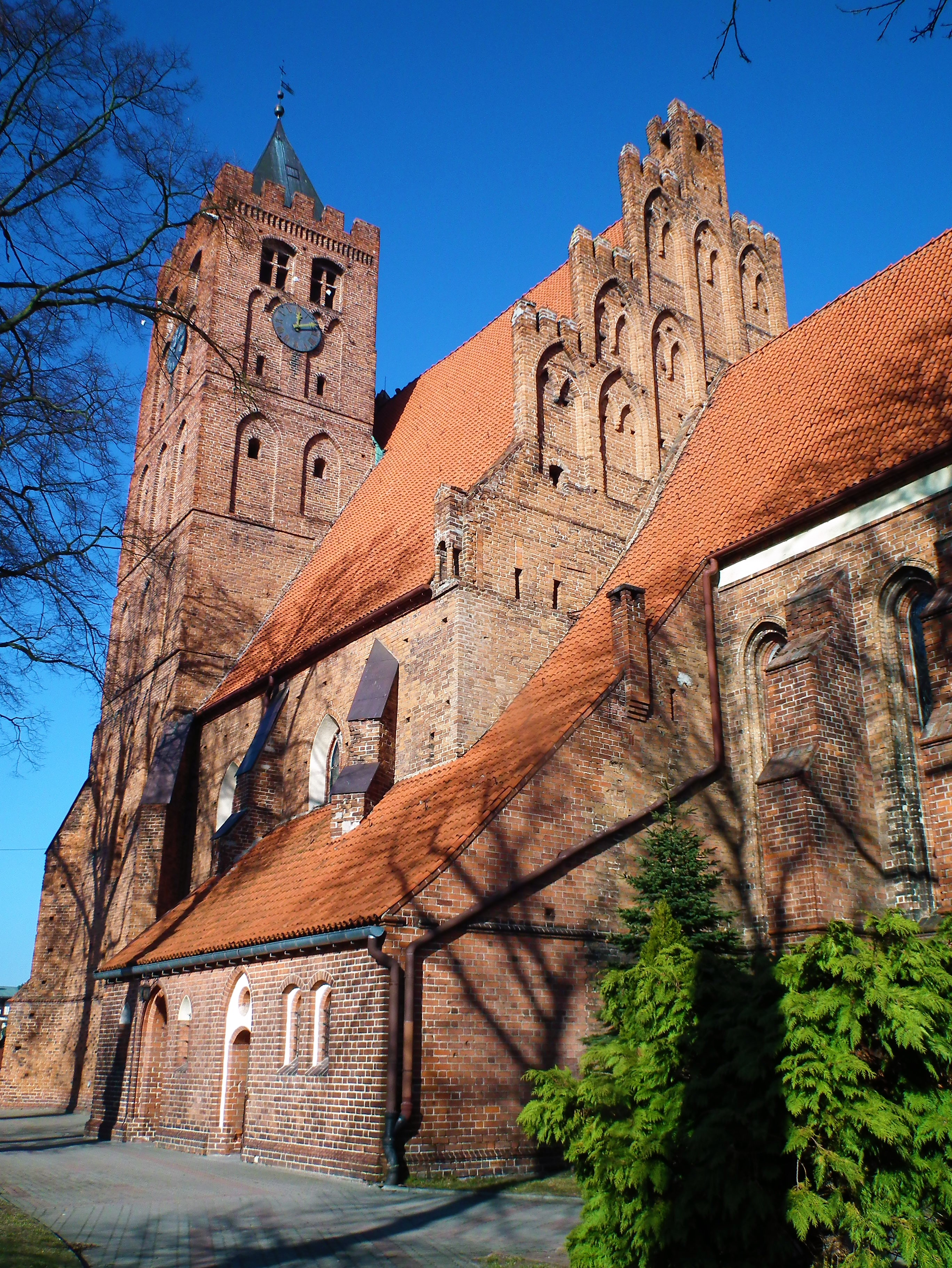
Saint Matthew church

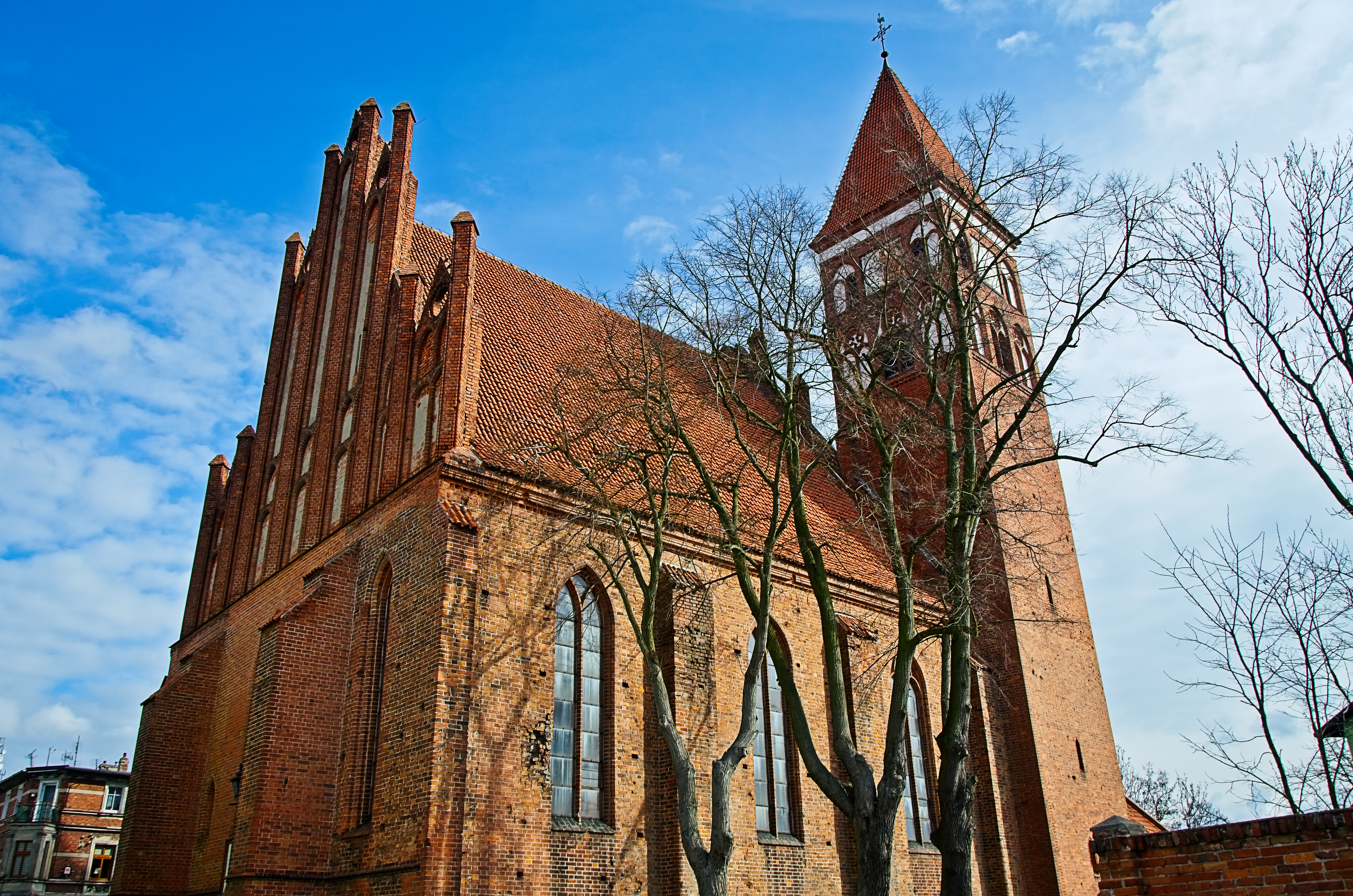
Saint Maximilian Kolbe church

=== Number of inhabitants by year ===
Year	Number
1773	1,079
1780	1,330
1831	2,430
1856	3,375
1868	4,586
1875	4,712
1880	4,947
1890	4,803
1905	5,142
1921	approx. 4,000
1943	5,233
2006	6,252

Note that the above table is based on primary, possibly biased or inaccurate, sources.

== Sights ==
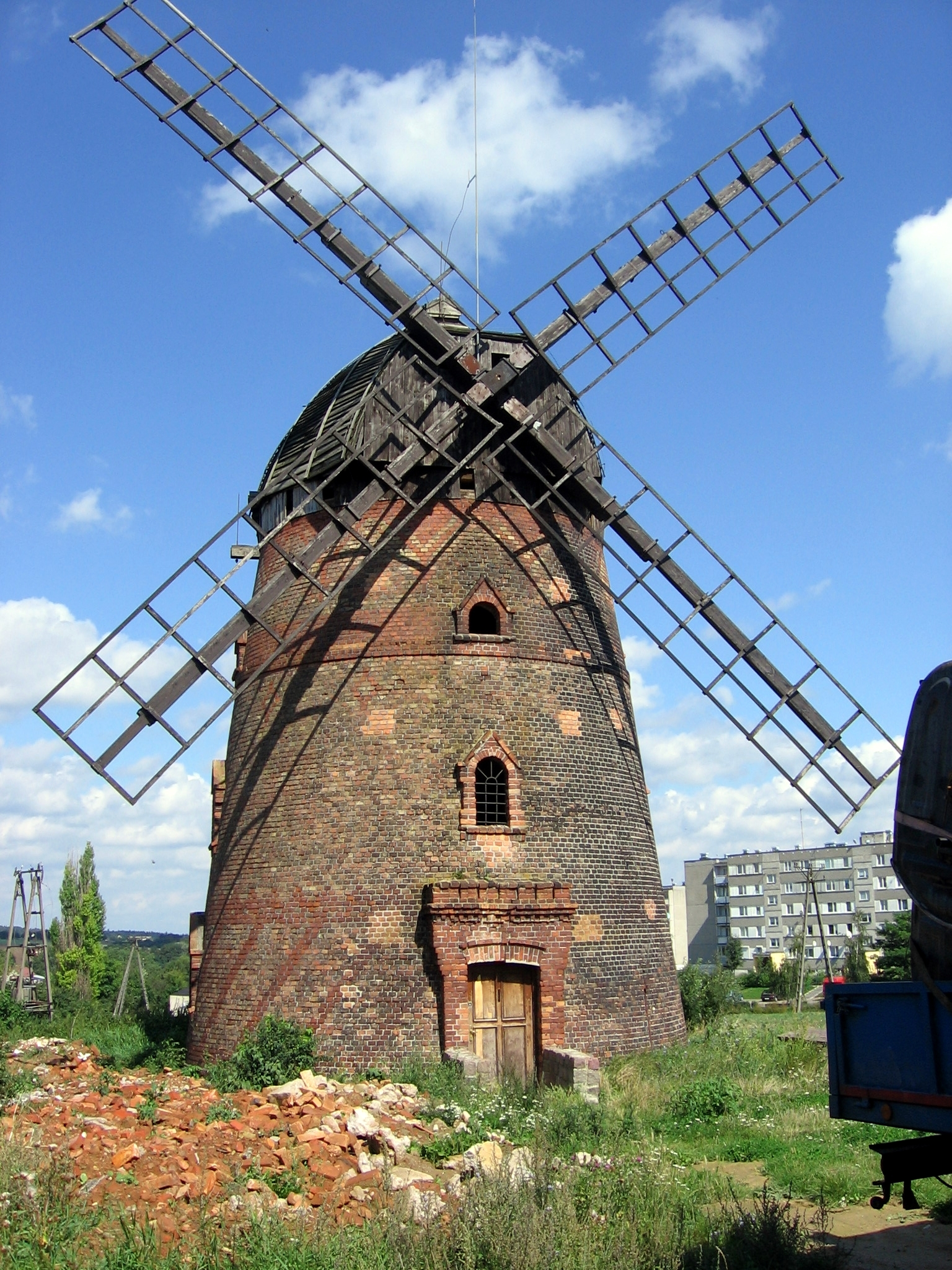
Olender windmill in Nowe

The landmarks of Nowe are the Old Town with the Rynek (market square) filled with colourful historic townhouses, the Gothic churches of Saint Matthew and Saint Maximilian Kolbe, and the medieval Nowe Castle, which today houses the Culture Centre.

== Transport ==
Nowe is located at the intersection of National road 91 and Voivodeship road 377, and the A1 motorway passes nearby, west of the town.

== Sports ==
The local football club is Wisła Nowe. It competes in the lower leagues.

== Notable people ==
- Bronisław Malinowski (1951–1981), Polish track and field athlete and Olympic gold medal winner.
- Herb Wiedoeft (1886–1928), German-American Jazz trumpeter and band leader of the 1920s.
