= Slap tonguing =

Musical technique used on wind instruments

In music, the term slap tonguing refers to a musician playing a single-reed instrument such as a clarinet or a saxophone employing a technique to produce a popping sound along with the note.

== The technique ==
The sound is created as a result of the release of suction in the mouth and the popping sound that the reed produces which amplifies as it travels through the horn.

This effect is similar to when you would suck on a spoon. To create this effect, lay your tongue against a lot of the reed. Gently push upward so that the tip and rail of the reed is closed. Get rid of as much air in the oral cavity as you can and seal off the lip so that you have an airtight fit. The tongue is quickly released in a downward motion. This is all done very quickly. Do not pull the tongue back towards your throat. It needs to pop downward away from the roof of the mouth to get the most volume, do not blow air through the horn and do not inhale when you release your tongue.

== Players ==
The first recorded appearance was by Stump Evans, the C melody saxophone player in the King Oliver band. Other famous players who used the technique were Rudy Wiedoeft, Coleman Hawkins, Fess Williams and Douglas Williams. Contemporary exponents include Sam Newsome.
