= Helen Lynd (actress) =

American actress (1902–1992)

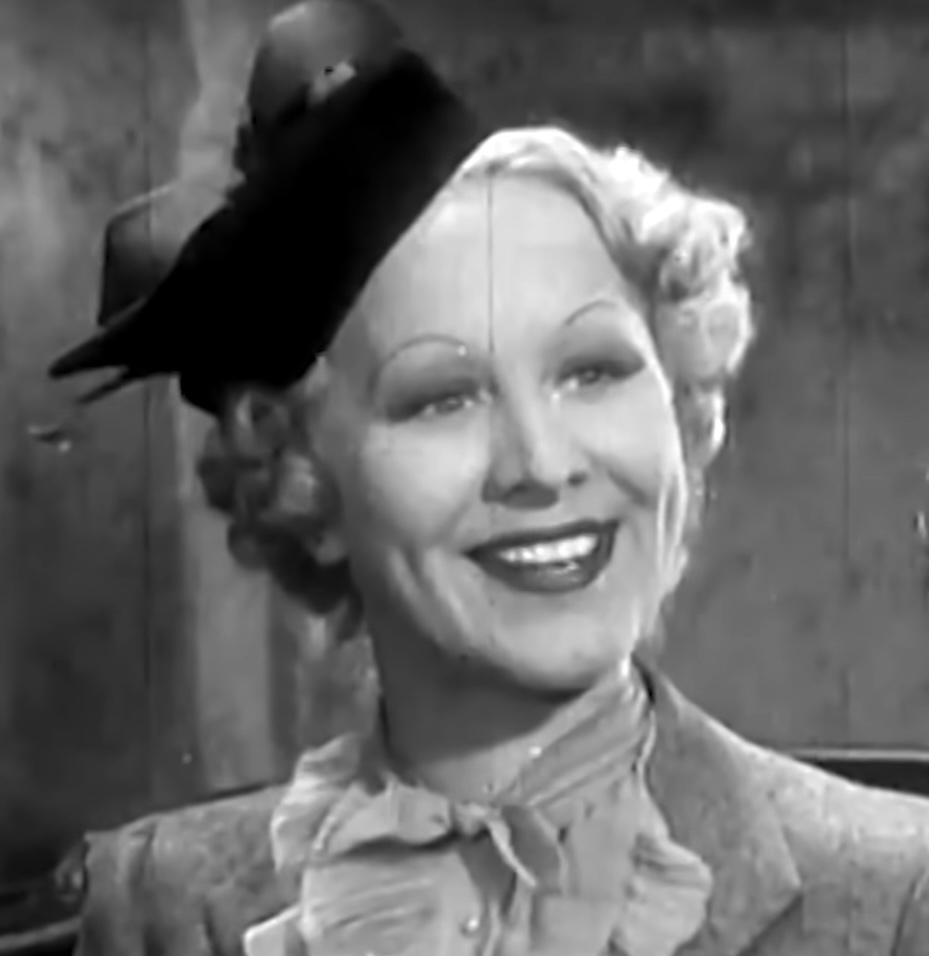
- Lyle in Hats Off (1936)
- Born: January 18, 1902; Jersey City, New Jersey, U.S.
- Died: April 1, 1992 (aged 90); Beverly Hills, California, U.S.
- Other names: Helene Lynch
- Occupation: Actress
- Years active: 1919–1949
- Spouse: Al Melick

Helen Lynd, also known as Helene Lynch, (January 18, 1902 – April 1, 1992) was an American actress and comedienne active on stage and in film.

== Early life and career ==
Born in Jersey City, New Jersey on January 18, 1902, Helen Lynd began her career in 1919 as a chorus girl in Ned Wayburn's Demi Tasse Revue at the Capitol Theatre on Broadway. In her early career she performed under the name Helene Lynch, and it was this name that she used in tryout performances of a new musical, Phil Charig's Yes, Yes, Yvette, in Boston in May 1927. By the time Yes, Yes, Yvette reached Broadway's Sam H. Harris Theatre on October 3, 1927, she was billed as Helen Lynd in the role of Mabel Terry; her first significant part on the stage for which The New York Times reviewer praised her execution of "low comedy".

In 1928 Lynd returned to Broadway as Frankie Shultz in the Jack Yellen and Milton Ager musical Rain or Shine at George M. Cohan's Theatre which was written as a starring vehicle for comedian Joe Cook. She left that production later in the year to star as Penny in Oscar Hammerstein II and Vincent Youmans's short lived musical Rainbow at the Gallo Opera House. After this she starred in the music revues The Little Show (1929-1930) and The Earl Carroll Vanities (1931-1932). Her other Broadway credits included Ladies' Money (1934, as Margie), Battleship Gertie (1935, as Gertie), The Hook-up (1935, as Virginia Bryce), and The Illustrators' Show (1936, multiple roles).

After the mid-1930s, Lynd was primarily active as a film actress in California into the late 1940s. She began her film career in 1930 starring in the short films Purely an Accident andWedding Bells.

== Personal life and death ==
Helen Lynd died in Beverly Hills, California on April 1, 1992. She was married to the talent agent Al Melick.

== Filmography ==
- Purely an Accident (1930)
- Wedding Bells (1930)
- Success (1931, as Molly)
- Maybe I'm Wrong (1932)
- Tee for Two (1932, as Blonde vocalist)
- The Build Up (1933, the Beach Boy's Sweetheart)
- Hats Off (1936, as Ginger Connolly)
- Swingtime in the Movies (1938, as Lorna)
- Of Mice and Men (1939, as Susie)
- When Tomorrow Comes (1939, as the waitress)
- Flight at Midnight (1939, as Josephine)
- The Lone Wolf Spy Hunt (1939, as Marie Templeton)
- Lucky Partners (1940, as Ethel)
- Murder in the Air (1940, as Dolly)
- Power Dive (1941, as Giggly Blonde)
- The Strawberry Blonde (1941, as Josephine)
- Here Comes Happiness (1941, as Flo)
- You're Telling Me (1942, as Miss Ames)
- The Great Man's Lady (1942, as Bettina Sempler)
- Moonlight in Havana (1942, as Daisy)
- So Proudly We Hail! (1943, as Lt. Elsie Bollenbacher)
- When the Wife's Away (1946, as Dolly)
- Any Number Can Play (1949, as Ellen)

== Bibliography ==
- American Film Institute (1971). Kenneth White Munden (ed.). The American Film Institute Catalog of Motion Pictures Produced in the United States. University of California Press.
- Ruth Benjamin, Arthur Rosenblatt (2006). "Helen Lynd". Who Sang what on Broadway, 1866-1996, Volume 1. McFarland & Company.
- Bordman, Gerald (2001). American Musical Theater: A Chronicle. Oxford University Press. ISBN 9780195130744.
- Edwin M. Bradley (2015). The First Hollywood Sound Shorts, 1926-1931. McFarland & Company. ISBN 9781476606842.
- Daniel Bubbeo (2010). The Women of Warner Brothers: The Lives and Careers of 15 Leading Ladies, with Filmographies for Each. McFarland & Company. ISBN 9780786462360.
- Jack Burton (1953). The Blue Book of Hollywood Musicals: Songs from the Sound Tracks and the Stars who Sang Them Since the Birth of the Talkies a Quarter-century Ago. Century House. ISBN 9780872820135.
- Dan Dietz (2019). The Complete Book of 1920s Broadway Musicals. Rowman & Littlefield Publishers. ISBN 9781538112823.
- Jocelyn Faris (1994). Ginger Rogers: A Bio-Bibliography. Bloomsbury Academic. ISBN 9780313291777.
- Thomas S. Hischak (2008). The Oxford Companion to the American Musical: Theatre, Film, and Television. Oxford University Press. ISBN 9780199887323.
- Roy Liebman (2003). "Lynd, Helen". Vitaphone Films: A Catalogue of the Features and Shorts. McFarland & Company. ISBN 9781476609362.
- Len D. Martin (1998). The Republic Pictures Checklist: Features, Serials, Cartoons, Short Subjects and Training Films of Republic Pictures Corporation, 1935-1959. McFarland & Company.
- Paul Mavis (2015). The Espionage Filmography: United States Releases, 1898 Through 1999. McFarland & Company. ISBN 9781476604275.
- Marty McGee (2015). Encyclopedia of Motion Picture Sound. McFarland & Company. ISBN 9781476609706.
- David C. Tucker (2021). S. Sylvan Simon, Moviemaker: Adventures with Lucy, Red Skelton and Harry Cohn in the Golden Age of Hollywood. McFarland & Company. ISBN 9781476682198.
- Graham Webb (2020). Encyclopedia of American Short Films, 1926-1959. McFarland & Company. ISBN 9781476639260.
