= The Midnight Patrol =

1933 film by Lloyd French

- Directed by: Lloyd French
- Written by: Stan Laurel; Sidney Rauh
- Produced by: Hal Roach
- Starring: Stan Laurel; Oliver Hardy
- Cinematography: Art Lloyd
- Edited by: Bert Jordan
- Music by: James Greene
- Distributed by: Metro-Goldwyn-Mayer
- Release date: August 3, 1933
- Running time: 19:40
- Country: United States
- Language: English

The Midnight Patrol is a short American pre-Code comedy film starring Laurel and Hardy released August 3, 1933.

== Plot ==
Laurel and Hardy play two police officers on night patrol. They get a call about a break-in and encounter a thief trying to crack a safe. Despite mistaking the thief for the shop owner, they unintentionally help him. When they realize their mistake, they let him go, coinciding with his planned bank robbery.

Later, they mistakenly arrest a homeowner locked out of his mansion, thinking he is the thief. Their colleagues praise them, but they soon discover the "thief" is actually the Chief of Police. Unable to explain their blunder, they flee as gunfire erupts, highlighting the consequences of their missteps.

== Cast ==
- Stan Laurel as Officer Stanley Laurel
- Oliver Hardy as Officer Oliver Hardy
- Louise Beavers as Maid (scenes deleted)
- Harry Bernard as Jail visitor
- Billy Bletcher as the voice of the Radio dispatcher
- Frank Brownlee as Police Chief Ramsbottom
- Edgar Dearing as Policeman
- Charlie Hall as Tire thief's partner
- Bob Kortman as Tire thief
- James C. Morton as Policeman
- Frank Terry as Safecracker
- Tiny Sandford as Policeman

== Production ==
The Midnight Patrol features two notable automobiles — a 1927 Cadillac Standard Line utilized as the police car and a 1925 Chevrolet Superior employed by the street thugs.

The Midnight Patrol features an African American character, portrayed by Al Corporal in the role of the Police Chief's butler. Additionally, deleted scenes intended to feature Louise Beavers as a maid would have further expanded the representation of African American characters.

The influence of this film extends beyond its cinematic realm, as evidenced by its commemoration in Laurel & Hardy fan organizations. Both the Stoke-on-Trent and San Jose tents of the Sons of the Desert pay homage to the film by adopting the name "The Midnight Patrol Tent."
