= Ruby Wright (big band-era singer) =

American singer-songwriter (1914–2004)

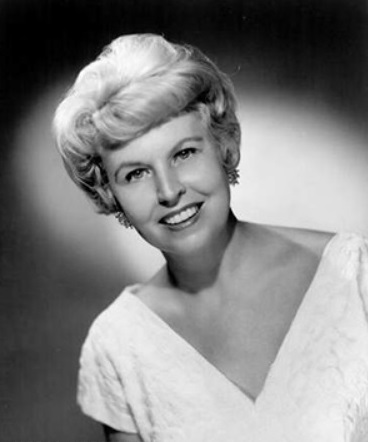
- Born: January 8, 1914; Anderson, Indiana, U.S.
- Died: March 9, 2004 (aged 90); Cincinnati, Ohio, U.S.
- Resting place: Spring Grove Cemetery; Cincinnati, Ohio
- Other names: Ruby Rapp; Ruby Rappaport; Ruby Wright-Rapp
- Occupation: Vocalist
- Organization(s): Reds' Rooters Fan Club (founder); Rosie Reds (trustee)
- Television: The Bob Braun Show (1967–1979)
- Spouse: Barney Rapp (1936–1970)
- Children: 4

Ruby Wright (January 8, 1914 – March 9, 2004) was an American singer and songwriter.

== Biography ==
Born on January 8, 1914, in Anderson, Indiana, Wright began singing with a trio of college girls in Lake Manitou, Indiana.

Though not very successful in the United States, she had two hits in the United Kingdom. The first, "Bimbo", made number 7 in the UK Singles Chart in April 1954, whilst in May 1959, her cover version of "Three Stars" reached number 19. Her most popular recording was a Christmas single, written by Ruth Lyons, "Let's Light the Christmas Tree" which sold 250,000 copies in 1958. She also sang on the radio on WLW, and appeared on Lyons show, "50-50 Club", for twenty years.

Wright was married to bandleader Barney Rapp. She also sang in his orchestra. The couple had four children.

A CD of Wright's recordings, which contained a total of 27 songs, is entitled Ruby Wright Regular Girl (The King Recordings 1949–1959).
