= Herb Wiedoeft =

German-American bandleader (1886–1928)

- Herb Wiedoeft Band

Background information
- Born: 22 November 1886; Neuenburg, West Prussia, German Empire
- Died: 12 May 1928 (aged 41) Medford, Oregon, United States
- Genre: Big band

Herbert Arthur Wiedoeft (22 November 1886 – 12 May 1928) was a German-American band leader in California in the 1920s.

== Career ==
Wiedoeft was born in Germany and came to the United States with his parents as a child. Wiedoeft came from a family of musicians and was encouraged by his father. His brothers Gerhardt and Adolph (nicknamed "Gay" and "Ad", respectively) played as sidemen in his band, Gerhardt on string bass and Adolph on percussion and xylophone. Another brother, Rudy Wiedoeft, was a saxophone player during the late ragtime and early jazz era. Their sister, Erica, was a pianist. Herbert himself played the trumpet.

Wiedoeft started his first orchestra before 1915. His band played for several years at the Cinderella Roof Ballroom at Sixth and Olive in downtown Los Angeles. The band's theme song, "Cinderella Blues", came from the name of this venue. The band recorded four songs for the Nordskog label in 1922. The band gained a recording contract with Brunswick Records, toured in Chicago and New York, and earned a national reputation. Their first record for Brunswick was "Cinderella Blues"/"Shine", the latter being the first recording of the song that had Lew Brown's revised lyrics. Clyde Lucas, who went on to form his own popular band in the 1930s and 1940s, started out as a singer and trombonist in the Herb Wiedoeft orchestra.

Wiedoeft died in a car accident in Medford, Oregon, on 12 May 1928, when his car skidded off the Medford–Klamath Falls highway. The trombonist Jesse Stafford took over the band and released another 13 sides on Brunswick Records under the name of the Jesse Stafford Orchestra.

== Discography ==
A partial list of Brunswick recordings:

Title	Composers	Recording		Serial
Title	Composers	Date	Location	Serial
Beale Street Blues	W.C. Handy	5-20-1924	Los Angeles, California	2795-A
Beside A Sunny Stream	Moret / Black	5-1925	Los Angeles, California	2893-A
Cinderella Blues	Norman Spencer / Herb Wiedoeft	8-14-1923	San Francisco, California	2542-A
Chimes Blues	Gene Rose / Johnson / Jesse Stafford	5-11-1924	Los Angeles, California	2647-B
Clementine	Brown	10-21-1924	Los Angeles, California	2730-B
Deep Elm	Willard Robison / Clay	10-14-1925	Chicago, Illinois	2982-B
Everything Is Hotsy Totsy Now (Vocal chorus by Clyde Lucas)	Jimmy McHugh / Irving Mills	5-1925	Los Angeles, California	2916-A
From Day To Day	Thompson / Wiedoeft / Rose	10-21-1924	Los Angeles, California	2730-A
Go Your Way and I'll Go Mine		5-7-1924	Los Angeles, California	2660
Hard Hearted Hannah	Yellen / Bigelow / Bates	10-21-1924	St. Louis, Missouri	2751-B
He's Just A Horn-Tootin' Fool	Lou Davis / Henry Busse / Ross Gorman	5-1925	Los Angeles, California	2916-B
Hoodoo Man	Brown	8-8-1924	Los Angeles, California	2627-A
Hot Stuff	Jackson / Herb Wiedoeft / Gene Rose / Jesse Stafford	10-21-1924	St. Louis, Missouri	2781-B
If It Wasn't For You	Berg / Fields / Herb Wiedoeft / Gene Rose	10-21-1924	Los Angeles, California	2781-A
I Want You All For Me	Fisher / Miller / Cohen	10-14-1925	Los Angeles, California	2982-A
Maple Leaf Rag	Scott Joplin	10-21-1924	St. Louis, Missouri	2795-B
Monte Carlo Moon		10-21-1924	St. Louis, Missouri	2751-A
Moonlight Memories	Rose / Terriss	5-11-1924	Los Angeles, California	2647-A
Oh, Peter! You're So Nice	Herb Wiedoeft / Gene Rose / Jesse Stafford	8-8-1924	Los Angeles, California	2627-B
Promenade Walk	Grey / Goodman / Rubens / Coots	10-12-1925	Los Angeles, California	2976
Roamin' Around	Herb Wiedoeft / Sonny Clay / Jesse Stafford	5-1925	Los Angeles, California	2893-B
Shine	arranged by Herb Wiedoeft	8-14-1923	San Francisco, California	2542-B
Stack O'Lee Blues	Ray Lopez / Lew Coswell	5-14-1924	Los Angeles, California	2660

== Works ==
- Herbert Wiedoeft (1926). "The Development of Jazz". Metronome. 4 (73).
