= Barney Rapp =

American bandleader and musician (1900–1970)

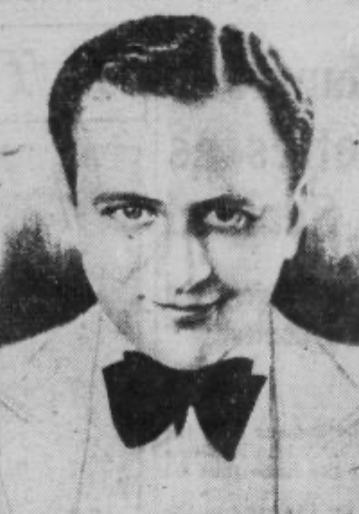
- Rappaport in a 1935 publication of the Indianapolis Times

Background information
- Born: Barney Rappaport; March 25, 1900; New Haven, Connecticut, US
- Died: October 12, 1970 (aged 70) Cincinnati, Ohio, US
- Genres: Jazz
- Occupations: Bandleader, musician
- Labels: RCA, Bluebird
- Spouse: Ruby Wright (m. 1936)

Barnaby Rappaport (March 25, 1900 – October 12, 1970) was an American bandleader and jazz musician known for his work with singer Doris Day.

== Biography ==
Barnaby Rappaport was born on March 25, 1900, in New Haven, Connecticut. His younger brother was singer Barry Wood. He organized his first band—an orchestra—in the early 1920s, in Connecticut. In 1936, he married Ruby Wright, a vocalist in his orchestra, having four children together.

Rappaport and Wright later moved to Cleveland, where he broadcast his music on local nighttime radio, which led to him signing to RCA and Bluebird Records. While searching for a singer for his planned club in Bond Hill, Cincinnati—called the Sign of the Drum—he met singer Doris Day in a restaurant in 1938. Two weeks later, he selected her as his singer from a pool of 200 contestants. He also suggested Day's stage name, because her surname was too difficult to pronounce; the suggestion began a trend of alliteration in women's stage name in pop music. Rappaport seduced and manipulated Doris, paying her $50 per week to sing in his band the New Englanders, with half being stolen by her manager. In 1947, he suggested singers Betty and Rosemary Clooney to bandleader Tony Pastor; he also seduced Rosemary.

He also founded the Reds' Rooters Fan Club for the Cincinnati Reds, once performing a band at a stadium for the team.

At some point, Rappaport visited California and appeared in a movie. He died on October 12, 1970, aged 70, in Cincinnati, and was interred at Spring Grove Cemetery.
