= Dave Apollon =

American musician (1898–1972)

Apollon, c. 1940s

Dave Apollon (born Denis Apollonov; Russian: Денис Аполлонов; February 23, 1898 – May 30, 1972) was an American mandolin player.

He is regarded as one of the most innovative and influential mandolinists of the twentieth century, whose more notable recordings and performances include "Two Guitars", Hora staccato by Grigoraș Dinicu, and Zigeunerweisen ("Gypsy Airs") by Pablo de Sarasate. His styles include Gypsy and various kinds of European folk music. He is also regarded as one of the first jazz mandolinists, with such memorable recordings as "Who" and "St. Louis Blues".

== Early life ==
Apollon was born in 1898, to a Jewish family in the city of Kiev, which was at the time part of Russia. At an early age, he played the violin but abandoned the instrument after taking a fervent interest in an old bowl back mandolin his father kept in the house.

== Career ==
By age 14, Apollon had already founded an ensemble and was performing professionally in a local movie theatre.

During World War I, he served in the Russian Revolution and used his mandolin as his greatest weapon. He sailed to the Philippines to continue working as a mandolin player and dancer. Afterwards, he went to Japan and got his visa to the US.

In 1919, he moved to New York City and almost immediately got a job in vaudeville, where he floored audiences with stunning virtuosity.

In 1929, he made the first of his musical shorts, something he would continue with for much of his career. In 1941 he was a member of the touring company of "Boys and Girls Together". In 1946, he met and played with Django Reinhardt while the legendary guitarist was on tour with Duke Ellington in New York. In early 1950, he released his version of the No. 1 hit "Third Man Theme" (made famous by Anton Karas and Guy Lombardo, among others) on the National label (#9104). The flip side was "The Cafe Mozart Waltz". "Billboard" described the single as "Sensational ... new ... and different." Apollon died on May 30, 1972, after a career that spanned over fifty years.
