= Clyde Lucas =

American big-band leader and musician

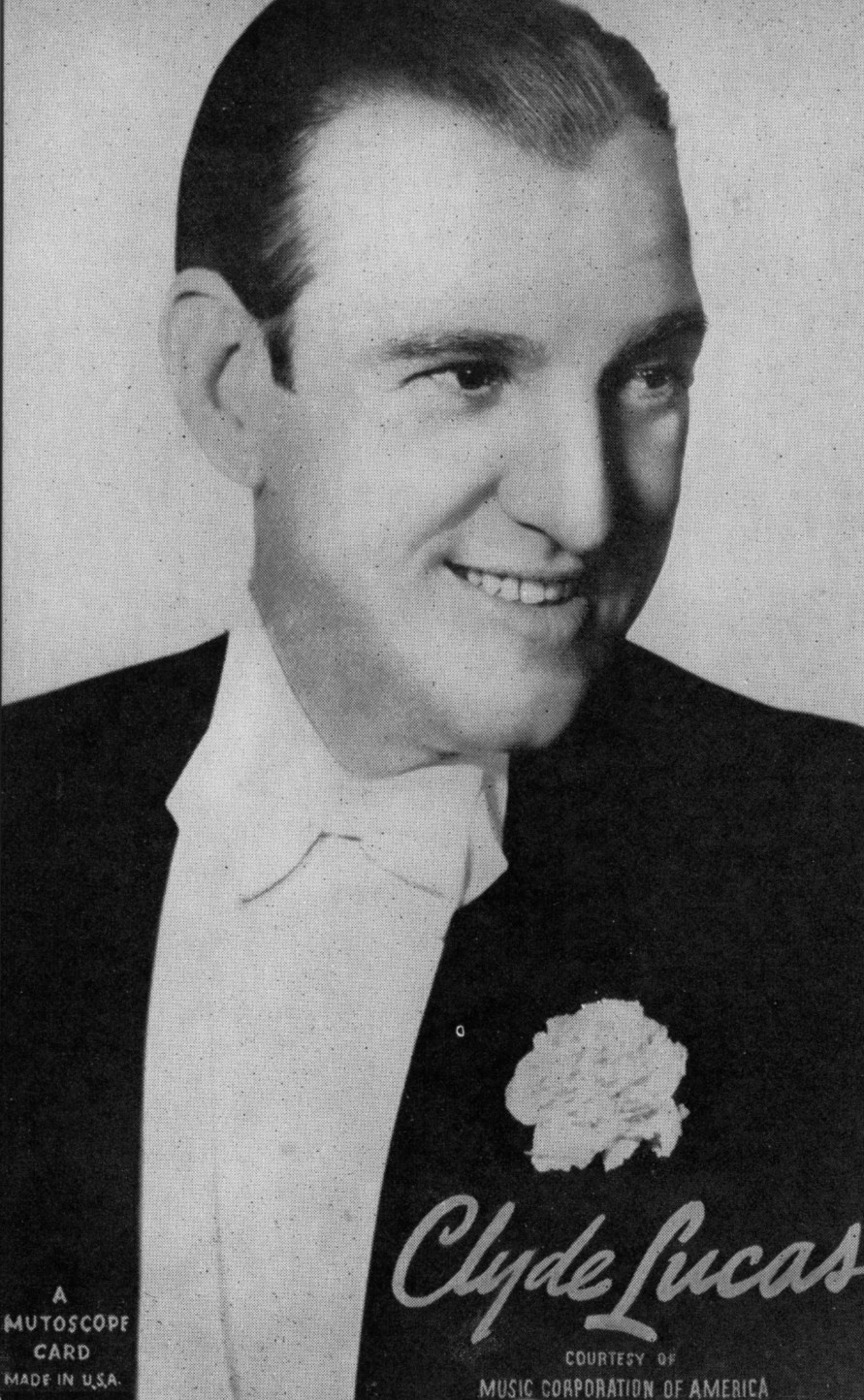
- Clyde Lucas promotional picture

Background information
- Born: c. 1901; Minneapolis, Kansas
- Died: January 15, 1982 (aged 80)
- Genres: Big Band
- Instrument: Trombone

Clyde H. Lucas (c. 1901 – January 15, 1982) was an American big-band leader who was popular in the United States in the 1930s and 1940s. He was the leader of Clyde Lucas and His California Dons.

== Early years ==
Lucas grew up in Los Angeles, California and was of "Chicano" (American Mexican) background. He began his career as a singer and trombonist in the Herb Wiedoeft orchestra, and launched his own band in the early 1930s. The band was versatile, playing a range of styles including popular Mexican tunes, Swing, Hawaiian and Hillbilly. The typical line-up at that time included four saxophones, two trumpets and a four-piece rhythm section, often with violins. Musicians were expected to be able to play more than one instrument.

In 1934, the Morrison Hotel and the Terrace Garden, both in Chicago, employed Lucas and his Dons. As the thirties progressed, "Clyde Lucas and his California Dons" grew in popularity, releasing records and playing on the radio. The band also recorded background music for some of the early talkies. In September 1938, Paramount Pictures released an 11-minute movie "short" called Lights, Action, Lucas, featuring the band. Other headliner shorts released around this time included Listen to Lucas (1938), Meet the Maestros (1938) and Clyde Lucas and His Orchestra (1939)

== 1940s ==
Gloria Wood, a popular singer from the 1940s through to the 1970s made her first recordings with the Clyde Lucas band. Singles released for Elite Records in 1941 included Sometimes and Somebody nobody knows, with flip sides Rose O'Day and When roses bloom again. Other singles from Elite that year included Shrine of St. Cecelia, I said No and Deep in the Heart of Texas. In 1942 Lucas released a cover of Glenn Miller's A string of pearls, but reviews were not favorable.

The band did not appeal to every musical taste. One radio announcer "accidentally" said "You are listening to the mucous of Clyde Lucas". However, in 1943 Billboard Magazine reported that Lucas had abandoned the schmaltzy California Dons, with its strong violin section, and was now heading a more modern swing ensemble. The band was still heavy on brass, with five saxophones and five other brass instruments besides rhythm and drums. A newcomer to the scene named Loren Helberg was featured as a tenor sax soloist, and the vocalist Teeny Riley had replaced Patty Ross.

The band continued to play in hotels and at balls through the 1940s. Lucas's band played in the July 1941 Police Ball and Reception in Troy, New York. In September 1942 the band was playing at the Hotel Claridge in Memphis, Tennessee and getting good reviews. In September 1943 the band was at the Tune Town Ballroom in St. Louis, Missouri. In December 1945 the band was playing the Biltmore Hotel in Providence, Rhode Island. The band eventually disbanded towards the end of the forties.

== Later life ==
Lucas married Gypsy Cooper, a saxophonist with who played for the Hour of Charm Orchestra, and they moved to Miami in 1946. He spent ten years as the programming director for WTVJ and became a pro golfer in 1960.
