= Rudy Wiedoeft =

American saxophonist (1893–1940)

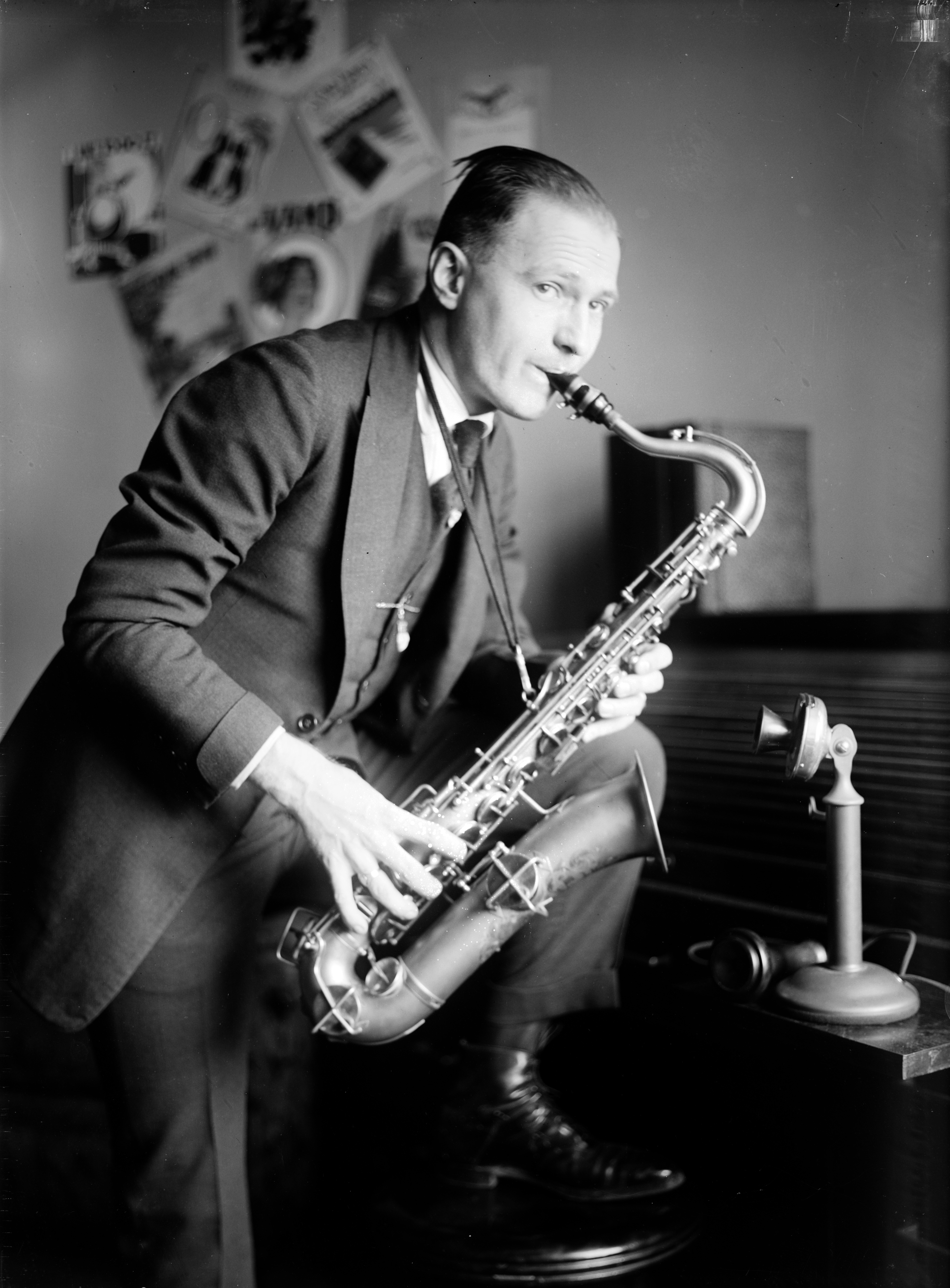
- Wiedoeft, c. 1920

Background information
- Born: Rudolph Cornelius Wiedoeft; January 3, 1893; Detroit, Michigan, U.S.
- Died: February 18, 1940 (aged 47) Flushing, Queens, New York, U.S.
- Genre: Early jazz
- Occupation: Musician
- Instruments: C melody saxophone; alto saxophone; soprano saxophone
- Years active: 1910s–1930s
- Relatives: Herb Wiedoeft (brother)

Rudolph Cornelius Wiedoeft (German: [ˈviː.dœft]; January 3, 1893 – February 18, 1940) was an American saxophonist whose compositions and solos on recordings helped popularize the instrument.

== Biography ==
Born in Detroit, Michigan, the son of German immigrants, Wiedoeft started playing with his family orchestra at a young age, first playing violin, then clarinet. He relocated to New York City and, after a series of successful clarinet recordings with his Frisco Jass Band, switched to saxophone, then still an unusual instrument. He became known as a virtuoso saxophonist during the 1910s, made more than 300 recordings for many different record companies, and did much to popularize the saxophone as an instrument in both the U.S. and overseas. His main instrument was the C melody saxophone, a variety which was immensely popular from the 1910s until about 1930. He also played and recorded sometimes using E♭ alto and B♭ soprano saxophones as well.

Wiedoeft (left) with Rudy Vallée in 1934

His style was noted for very rapid runs of well-articulated notes in between long legato phrases in a ragtime-influenced style. The rapidly articulated notes were made possible by the advanced techniques of double-tonguing and triple-tonguing, similar to those used by brass players and flautists. He was also known for his style of vibrato, which was very wide, or broad, during the later years of his playing. During his earlier years, Wiedoeft's use of vibrato was quite limited. Wiedoeft employed several other extended techniques, such as slap tonguing and "laughing" (altering/bending the pitch of the note) through his horn, which alongside his very distinguishable vibrato, became a part of his musical repertoire. While he incorporated some elements of early jazz into his playing, he remained stylistically a pre-jazz artist. Some of his original compositions were successes, notably "Valse Erica", "Valse Llewellyn", "Saxema", "Saxophobia", and "Sax-o-Phun".

"Saxophobia"
- "Saxophobia" "Saxophobia", Victor 18728-B, 1920
- "Saxophobia" Wiedoeft's 1920 instrumental composition "Saxophobia", with an orchestra conducted by Josef Pasternack

He remained a very popular entertainer into the 1920s and performed regularly by radio, but his style began to sound more and more dated to the public as his career continued into the 1930s. He worked for a while in the band of Rudy Vallée, then for a while in France. From the mid-1930s on, he essentially stopped playing and was involved in several mining investments that were not successful.

Wiedoeft and his wife, Mary, had a difficult relationship partially due to difficulties of maintaining their rather flamboyant lifestyle and alcohol abuse. In 1937, he was nearly killed when he was stabbed by his wife. The couple reconciled, however, and during the same year, Rudy made his last radio performance.

He died in Flushing, Queens, on February 18, 1940, from cirrhosis.

== Legacy ==
Before 1920, Frank Holton & Co. adapted features from existing production model saxophones and marketed them as the "Rudy Wiedoeft Model". However, it is doubtful Wiedoeft actually performed with such instruments.

Several of Wiedoeft's siblings also became professional musicians, the most famous being the West Coast bandleader Herb Wiedoeft (1886–1928).
