= Lloyd French =

American film director (1900–1950)

- Born: January 11, 1900; San Francisco, California, U.S
- Died: May 24, 1950 (aged 50)

Lloyd French (January 11, 1900 – May 24, 1950) was an American director of short films, most of them comedies. His best remembered films are several Laurel and Hardy comedies in the 1930s. He also made several musical short films featuring many bandleaders of the day; in the 1940s he also directed several shorts starring Edgar Kennedy and Leon Errol; he made his last film in 1946.

French was born in San Francisco, California and died in Beverly Hills, California of heart disease.

== Partial Filmography ==
(With Laurel and Hardy):

- That's My Wife (1929)
- The Midnight Patrol (1933)
- Busy Bodies (1933)
- Dirty Work (1933)
- Oliver the Eighth (1934)
