= Technicolor Specials (Warner Bros. series) =

Technicolor Special was a common term used for Hollywood studio produced color short films of the 1930s and 1940s that did not belong to a specified series (as marketed in the trade periodicals).

With the Warner Brothers studio, the key word "special" was applied to those color live-action shorts that ran two reels or roughly 20 minutes in length. Those running longer were dubbed Warner Featurettes. Other series names used occasionally were "Technicolor Broadway Brevities" (briefly in the '30s) and "Technicolor Miniatures" (for a pair of ballet performances filmed in 1941).

== Overview ==
Warner Brothers distinguished their two-reel Technicolor Specials from their many shorter color films, running under ten minutes (or one reel) in length. These included the animated Merrie Melodies and later Looney Tunes, Vitaphone Varieties (in color from 1929–30), E. M. Newman "Colortours", Vitaphone Color Parade, Sports Parade, Technicolor Adventures and Scope Gems, the last series occasionally running longer but distinguished by its use of CinemaScope.

Combined, the studio was able to supply theater owners with enough color short subjects practically on a weekly or bi-weekly basis by the end of the thirties. In fact, only one or two feature films needed to be shot annually in color during the years 1940–47 since there was more than enough presented as "extras" before the main feature attraction. At a time when the studio stopped making features in color, four back-to-back two-reel musicals (over 70 minutes' worth) were made in Burbank, California in the autumn of 1933, with Eddie Cline supervising almost as if he was making a feature film.

1934's Service with a Smile was the first shot in the full Technicolor. Previously a more primitive 2-strip system was used. Two decades later, these were processed under the studio's own Warnercolor system and occasionally dubbed "Warnercolor Specials".

The studio was particularly successful with some recreations of American history during the years 1936–1940, the first being Song of a Nation with Donald Woods playing Francis Scott Key. These kept the costume and set design departments busy and provided major stars like Claude Rains alternative projects to exercise, develop or diversify their acting skills between features. Another sub-series dramatized young men and women (again played by actors on the studio payroll) involved in the different military branches. Such titles as Service with the Colors helped prepare movie-goers for the inevitable conflict overseas and encouraged enlistment. Both series provided enough stock footage for later history lessons like March on America! (stretching from the pilgrim landing on Plymouth Rock through the Japanese attack on Pearl Harbor) and My Country 'Tis of Thee (reusing much of the same footage, but continuing through the war years thanks to recent additions like Beachhead to Berlin).

Likewise, the ambitious mini-musicals of the thirties allowed similar recycling for a trio of forties titles: Musical Movieland, Movieland Magic and Hollywood Wonderland. These only required a "framing scene" with a tour guide showing Hollywood visitors films in production. The production numbers shown were lifted from earlier shorts like Swingtime in the Movies.

By 1942, an increasing number of these were documentary and travelogue subjects. Among the most notable from the post-war crop were a pair of prestigious India travelogues, Soap Box Derby (the first of many trips to the mini-car races in Ohio), Down the Nile (showcasing Egypt post-war), Jungle Terror (covering Hassoldt Davis and his wife's Amazon adventure), The Seeing Eye (covering the Morristown, New Jersey training of dogs for the handicapped), Winter Paradise (John Jay's ski adventure down the Austrian slopes), Thar She Blows! (aboard a whaling ship) and some well-liked scenic tours of Europe filmed by André de la Varre. Edgar Bergen appeared in a comic-travelogue Charlie McCarthy and Mortimer Snerd in Sweden; its director Larry Lansburgh supplied a number of outdoor and animal interest documentary shorts for both Warner Bros. and Walt Disney in the fifties including some Oscar winners.

The later documentaries also benefited greatly from energetic narration (i.e. Marvin Miller also voiced popular radio shows and animated cartoons of the period) and orchestra scores that only a major film studio could provide. Not surprisingly, they continued to do well annually at awards time, with Warner Brothers eventually surpassing Metro-Goldwyn-Mayer in the number of short subject Academy Awards and nominations. Making the Motion Picture Herald lists of top ten money making shorts in 1944-45, the best titles enjoyed a second life as reissues in theaters along with Warner's newer features and shorts, from the mid-'40s through 1967.

== List of titles ==
A full list is provided below, arranged by the year of release (but not necessarily the year filmed). Sometimes a date reviewed by The Film Daily or a copyright date is listed. All run 16 to 22 minutes unless otherwise noted. Since Howard Jackson handled the majority of music scores after 1934, only the William Lava solo efforts are indicated. Gordon Hollingshead produced many titles from Moroccan Nights through Thar She Blows. Cedric Francis took over a key producer in charge after Hollingshead's passing in 1952.

=== 1932-1934 (2-strip system) ===
Title	Major credits	Release, copyright or review date
C'est Paree	Roy Mack	July 23, 1932 (Film Daily review)
Pickin' a Winner (Pick a Winner)	Roy Mack	August 23, 1932 (preview)
Northern Exposure	Roy Mack; Snub Pollard & Sheila Terry	August 23, 1932 (preview)
Hey! Hey! Westerner	Roy Mack; Eddie Nugent	August 23, 1932 (preview)
Tee for Two	Roy Mack; Franklin Pangborn, Esther Howard, Helen Lynd & Eddie Kane	August 31, 1932 (Film Daily review)
Pleasure Island	Roy Mack; Tom Dugan, Richard Powell, Neely Edwards, Hank Mann, Winona Love & Maxine Lewis	October 3, 1932 (Film Daily review)
'Tis Spring	John Francis Dillon (director); Hugh Herbert	© October 28, 1933
Morocco Nights	Eddie Cline (director); Fuzzy Knight, Shirley Ross, Teddy Wolf Orchestra & others	January 6, 1934
Girl Trouble	Eddie Cline (director); Mitchell & Durant	© March 1, 1934
Not Tonight, Josephine	Eddie Cline (director); Frank McHugh, Kitty Kelly & others	© March 2, 1934
Business Is a Pleasure	Eddie Cline (director); Teddy Joyce, Betty Grable, Hobart Cavanaugh & Robert Agnew	© March 17, 1934

=== 1930s (full color) ===
Title	Major credits	Release, copyright or review date	Notes
Service with a Smile	Roy Mack; Leon Errol, Maxine Doyle, Herbert Evans, Marie Wells & Billy Bletcher	July 25, 1934 (preview)	Vitaphone Cavalcade of Musical Comedy Shorts (Warner Archive) DVD
Good Morning, Eve	Roy Mack; Leon Errol, June MacCloy, Vernon Dent, Maxine Doyle	August 5, 1934	Dames & Vitaphone Cavalcade of Musical Comedy Shorts (Warner Archive) DVD
What, No Men!	Ralph Staub (director); El Brendel, Phil Regan & Winifred Shaw	August 22, 1934 (preview)	Nominee for Academy Award for Best Live Action Short Film. Vitaphone Cavalcade of Musical Comedy Shorts (Warner Archive) DVD
Show Kids	Ralph Staub (director); Arthur Aylesworth, Florence Fair & the Meglin Kiddies	January 5, 1935	The Gay Divorcee (Greatest Classic Films Astaire & Rogers 1) DVD
Gypsy Sweetheart	Ralph Staub (director); Margaret Dumont, Winifred Shaw, Phillip Reed & Eddie Shubert	March 30, 1935	Vitaphone Cavalcade of Musical Comedy Shorts (Warner Archive) DVD
Springtime in Holland	Ralph Staub (director); Hobart Cavanaugh, Dorothy Dare, Al Shean & Felix Knight	June 22, 1935	
Romance of the West	Ralph Staub (director); Phil Regan, Bob Nolan, Henry Armetta & Mary Treen	August 3, 1935	
Reg'lar Kids	Ralph Staub (director); Famous Meglin Kiddies	October 19, 1935	
Okay, José	Ralph Staub (director); El Brendel, Julian Riviero, Alberto Sergio & Joan Woodbury	December 7, 1935	Vitaphone Cavalcade of Musical Comedy Shorts (Warner Archive) DVD
Carnival Day	Ralph Staub (director); Henry Armetta, Felix Knight & Joan Barclay	January 11, 1936	Vitaphone Cavalcade of Musical Comedy Shorts (Warner Archive) DVD
King of the Islands	Ralph Staub (director); Winifred Shaw, Warren Hymer & Edward McWade	February 22, 1936	Vitaphone Cavalcade of Musical Comedy Shorts (Warner Archive) DVD
Changing of the Guard	Bobby Connolly (director); Sybil Jason	May 13, 1936 (preview)	Vitaphone Cavalcade of Musical Comedy Shorts (Warner Archive) DVD
Song of a Nation	Frank MacDonald (director); screenplay: Forrest Barnes; Donald Woods, Clare Dodd & Carlyle Moore, Jr.	June 12, 1936 (BoxOffice review date)	
The Sunday Roundup	William Clemens (film director); Dick Foran, Jane Wyman, Linda Perry & others	July 10, 1936	Vitaphone Cavalcade of Musical Comedy Shorts (Warner Archive) DVD
Echo Mountain	Ralph Staub (director); Fred Laurence & Rosalind Marquis	October 30, 1936	Vitaphone Cavalcade of Musical Comedy Shorts (Warner Archive) DVD
Give Me Liberty	B. Reeves Eason (director); story and screenplay: Forrest Barnes; John Litel, Robert Warwick, Nedda Harrington & others	December 3, 1936 (preview)	Academy Award for Best Live Action Short Film. The Charge of the Light Brigade (1936 film) DVD
Under Southern Stars	Nick Grinde (director); story and screenplay: Forrest Barnes; Fred Laurence, Jane Bryan, Fritz Leiber, Sr. & others	February 20, 1937	Black Legion (film) DVD
The Romance of Robert Burns	Crane Wilbur (director); story: Forrest Barnes; Owen King, Linda Mason & Marcia Ralston	April 10, 1937	Hollywood Hotel (film) DVD
A Day at Santa Anita	Bobby Connolly (director); Sybil Jason, Marcia Ralston, Matthew Beard, Bette Davis, Ruby Keeler, Al Jolson, Edward G. Robinson, Olivia de Havilland & others	May 22, 1937	The Jazz Singer & Each Dawn I Die (Greatest Gangster Films James Cagney) DVD
Romance of Louisiana	Crane Wilbur (director); Erville Anderson, Addison Richards & Suzanne Kaaren	July 8, 1937	Gold Diggers of 1937 DVD
Little Pioneer	Bobby Connolly (director); Sybil Jason, Jane Wyman, Carlyle Moore Jr. & others	July 31, 1937	
The Littlest Diplomat	Bobby Connolly (director); Sybil Jason & Lumsden Hare	September 18, 1937	The Life of Emile Zola DVD
The Man Without a Country	Crane Wilbur (director); screenplay: Forrest Barnes, from story by Edward Everett Hale; John Litel, Ted Osborne, Gloria Holden & Holmes Herbert	November 27, 1937	Nominee for Academy Award for Best Live Action Short Film. San Quentin (1937 film) DVD
Romance Road	Bobby Connolly (director); Walter Cassell, Anne Nagel & others	January 26, 1938	The Dawn Patrol (1938 film), The Life of Emile Zola & Vitaphone Cavalcade of Musical Comedy Shorts (Warner Archive) DVD
Out Where the Stars Begin	Bobby Connolly (director); Fritz Field, Evelyn Thaw, Armida (actress), Jeffrey Lynn, Pat O'Brien, Ann Sheridan & others	May 14, 1938	Angels with Dirty Faces & Vitaphone Cavalcade of Musical Comedy Shorts (Warner Archive) DVD
Sons of the Plains	Crane Wilbur (director); Billy and Bobby Mauch	July 30, 1938	
Campus Cinderella	Noel M. Smith (director); Penny Singleton, Johnnie Davis, Anthony Averill & Oscar O'Shea	September 17, 1938	Bringing Up Baby (2-disc) DVD
Declaration of Independence	Crane Wilbur (director); Charles Tedford (story); (Ted Osborne), John Litel, Walter Walker, Rosella Towne, Owen King & Richard Bond	November 26, 1938	Academy Award for Best Live Action Short Film, A Slight Case of Murder DVD
Swingtime in the Movies	Crane Wilbur (director); Fritz Feld, Katherine Kane, Jerry Colonna, Humphrey Bogart, George Brent, the Dead End Boys, John Garfield, Priscilla Lane & others	December 26, 1938	Nominee for Academy Award for Best Live Action Short Film, They Drive by Night (Classic Legends Humphrey Bogart) DVD
Lincoln in the White House	William McGann (director); Frank McGlynn, Sr., Dickie Moore, John Harron & others	January 13, 1939 (preview)	The Old Maid (1939 film) DVD
Sons of Liberty	Michael Curtiz & Crane Wilbur (directors); Claude Rains, Gale Sondergaard, Donald Crisp & Montagu Love	May 20, 1939	Academy Award for Best Live Action Short Film, Dodge City (1939 film) DVD
The Right Way	Crane Wilbur (director); Gabriel Dell	June 26, 1939	
Quiet, Please	Crane Wilbur (director); Fritz Feld, Charles Foy, Larry Williams, Tom Kennedy & Katherine Kane	July 1, 1939	Invisible Stripes DVD
The Bill of Rights	Crane Wilbur (director); Ted Osborne, Vernon Steele, Moroni Olsen & Leonard Mudie	August 19, 1939	Allegheny Uprising (John Wayne Collection) DVD
Ride, Cowboy, Ride	George Amy (director); Dennis Morgan, Cliff Edwards, Maris Wrixon & George Reeves	September 9, 1939	
The Monroe Doctrine	Crane Wilbur (director); Grant Mitchell, Charles Waldron, Sidney Blackmer, Nanette Fabray, George Reeves & James Stephenson	October 21, 1939	Invisible Stripes DVD
The Royal Rodeo	George Amy (director); story: Owen Crump; Cliff Edwards, Scotty Beckett & John Payne	November 25, 1939	The Private Lives of Elizabeth and Essex DVD
Old Hickory	Lewis Seiler (director); story: Owen Crump; Hugh Sothern, Nana Bryant & Victor Kilian	December 23, 1939	Dark Victory Blu-ray

=== 1940s ===
Title	Major credits	Release or copyright date	Notes
Teddy, the Rough Rider	Ray Enright (director); Sidney Blackmer, Pierre Watkin & Theodore von Eltz	February 24, 1940	Academy Award for Best Live Action Short Film, Knute Rockne, All American DVD
The Singing Dude	William C. McGann (director); Dennis Morgan, Lucile Fairbanks & Fuzzy Knight	April 5, 1940	
Cinderella's Feller	William McGann (director); Juanita Quigley, Scotty Beckett & Maris Wrixon	June 8, 1940	Virginia City DVD
Pony Express Days (Wild West Days)	B. Reeves Eason (director); George Reeves, David Bruce, Frank Wilcox & J. Farrell McDonald	July 6, 1940	Torrid Zone DVD
Service with the Colors	B. Reeves Eason (director); Owen Crump (writer); Robert Armstrong, William Lundigan, William T. Orr, Herbert Anderson & George Hayward	August 31, 1940	Nominee for Academy Award for Best Live Action Short Film, City for Conquest (Greatest Gangster Films James Cagney) DVD
The Flag of Humanity	Jean Negulesco (director); Nana Bryant, Fay Helm, John Hamilton, Ted Osborne & others	October 19, 1940	Virginia City (film) DVD
March On, Marines	B. Reeves Eason (director); Dennis Morgan, John Litel & David Bruce	December 14, 1940	
Meet the Fleet	B. Reeves Eason (director); story: Owen Crump; Robert Armstrong, William T. Orr, George Reeves, & Herbert Anderson	December 21, 1940	All This, and Heaven Too DVD
Wings of Steel	B. Reeves Eason (director); story: Owen Crump; Douglas Kennedy, Herbert Anderson, Tom Neal & Ralph Byrd	April 5, 1941	
Here Comes the Cavalry	D. Ross Lederman (director); story: Owen Crump (writer); William Justice & Gary Owen	June 28, 1941	
Carnival of Rhythm	Stanley Martin (director); narrator: Knox Manning; Katherine Dunham & her dance troupe	August 23, 1941	Available on The Bride Came C.O.D. DVD
The Tanks Are Coming	B. Reeves Eason (director); George Tobias, William Justice, Frank Wilcock & Byron Barr	October 4, 1941	Nominee for Academy Award for Best Live Action Short Film, Desperate Journey & Objective, Burma! DVD
The Gay Parisian	Jean Negulesco (director); Ballet Russe de Monte Carlo	December 26, 1941	"Technicolor Miniature"; Nominee for Academy Award for Best Live Action Short Film, The Maltese Falcon DVD
Soldiers in White	B. Reeves Eason (director); Owen Crump (writer); William T. Orr, John Litel & Eleanor Parker	February 7, 1942	They Died with Their Boots On DVD
Spanish Fiesta	Jean Negulesco (director); Ballet Russe de Monte Carlo	May 16, 1942	"Technicolor Miniature" (filmed 1941); In This Our Life DVD
March on America!	Owen Crump (writer); narrator: Richard Whorf	May 16, 1942	In This Our Life DVD
The Pacific Frontier	Frederick Richards (film editor); narrator: Raine Bennett	May 23, 1942	documentary on Hawaii
The Daughter of Rosie O'Grady	Jean Negulesco (director); Patty Hale, Al Shean & Peter Caldwell	July 11, 1942	
Men of the Sky (Under Those Wings)	B. Reeves Eason (director); Owen Crump (writer); Eleanor Parker, Tod Andrews, Don DeFore & Ray Montgomery	July 25, 1942	Across the Pacific DVD
A Ship Is Born	First Motion Picture Unit; Jean Negulesco (director); Owen Crump (writer); music: William Lava; narrator: Knox Manning	October 10, 1942	
The Fighting Engineers	B. Reeves Eason (director); narrator: Knox Manning; Richard Travis	January 2, 1943	
Young and Beautiful	Will Jason (director); music: William Lava; William Haines & Elizabeth Arden (art directors); Gracie Fields, Frieda Inescort & Jinx Falkenburg	March 13, 1943	
Eagles of the Navy	Joe Gosling	April 24, 1943	filmed at Pensacola, Florida training facility
Champions Training Champions	James Bloodworth (director); music: William Lava; narrator: Lou Marcelle	June 26, 1943	for U.S. Navy
Mountain Fighters	B. Reeves Eason (director); narrator: Lou Marcelle	August 7, 1943	filmed at Camp Hale, Colorado
Women at War	Jean Negulesco (director);; music: William Lava; Virginia Christine	October 2, 1943	Nominee for Academy Award for Best Live Action Short Film, Air Force (film) DVD
Behind the Big Top	A. Pam Blumenthal & Van Campen Heilner (producers); André de la Varre (director); narrator: Art Gilmore	November 27, 1943	shot in Sarasota, Florida
Task Force	narrator: Jackson Beck	December 11, 1943	made for the U.S. Coast Guard
Roaring Guns	Jean Negulesco (director); Robert Shayne	February 19, 1944	"Santa Fe Trail" series; Rocky Mountain DVD
A Night in Mexico City	Augustin Delgado (director); James A. Fitzpatrick (narrator)	March 25, 1944	
Wells Fargo Days	Mack V. Wright (director); Dennis Moore (actor)	May 1, 1944	"Santa Fe Trail" series; Rocky Mountain DVD
Winner's Circle	A. Pam Blumenthal & Van Campen Heilner (prodfucers); André de la Varre (director); narrator: Roger Q. Denny	May 6, 1944	profiles Kentucky thoroughbreds
Trial By Trigger	William C. McGann (director); Robert Shayne, Cheryl Walker, Warner Anderson, Ralph Dunn & Henry Sharp	May 27, 1944	"Santa Fe Trail" series; Rocky Mountain DVD
Devil Boats	A. Pam Blumenthal & André de la Varre (producers); Arnold Albert (director); music: William Lava; Warren Douglas	July 22, 1944	demonstrates the production of PT boats.
Musical Movieland	LeRoy Prinz	September 9, 1944	Night and Day DVD
Trailin' West	George Templeton (director); John Spelvin, Elaine Riley & Chill Wills	October 1, 1944	"Santa Fe Trail" series
Let's Go Fishing	André de la Varre (director)	October 21, 1944	
Beachhead to Berlin	Charles Tedford (director); music: William Lava	December 16, 1944	color footage of D-Day
Coney Island Honeymoon	Arnold Albert (director); Warren Douglas & Angela Greene	June 16, 1945	(© December 19, 1944)
America the Beautiful	André de la Varre (director); story: Saul Elkins & Owen Crump (writer); music: William Lava; narrator: Truman Bradley	August 4, 1945	
Orders from Tokyo	narrator: David Griffin	August 18, 1945	filmed in the Philippines
Frontier Days	Jack Scholl (director); Robert Shayne, Dorothy Malone & Rory Mallnson	October 20, 1945	San Antonio (film) DVD
Hawaiian Memories	John D. Craig (director)	© December 27, 1945	
The Forest Commandos	Van Campen Heilner (producer); André de la Varre (director); music: Rex Dunn	January 19, 1946	filmed in Ontario
Movieland Magic	James Kern & Jack Scholl (directors); Mel Torme	March 9, 1946	Deception (1946 film) DVD
Gem of the Ocean	music: William Lava; narrator: Truman Bradley	April 13, 1946	visits wartime Guam
South of Monterrey	Sullivan C. Richardson (director); music: Rex Dunn; narrator: Truman Bradley	© June 30, 1946	Mexico travelogue.
Down Singapore Way	Deane H. Dickason; music: Rex Dunn	July 20, 1946	tour of East Indies (Indonesia)
Men of Tomorrow	Saul Elkins (director); music: William Lava; narrator: Knox Manning	August 24, 1946	(© December 31, 1945); about the Boy Scouts
Sunset in the Pacific	music: William Lava	© December 20, 1946	wartime cameramen are profiled
A Boy and His Dog	LeRoy Prinz & Saul Elkins (directors); music: William Lava; Harry Davenport, Billy Shefield, Russell Simpson & Dorothy Adams	December 24, 1946 (preview)	Academy Award for Best Live Action Short Film
Saddle Up!	Luis Osorno Barona (director)	March 1, 1947	covers horse sports in Mexico
Hollywood Wonderland	Jack Scholl (director)	August 9, 1947	(filmed April 1946); Tycoon DVD
A Day at the Fair	Saul Elkins (director); narrator: Art Gilmore	August 30, 1947	Covers the 1946 centennial state fair of Des Moines, Iowa where the film premiered
Romance and Dance	Luis Osorno Barona (director); narrator: Truman Bradley	August 30, 1947	features various dances of Mexico
King of the Carnival	Saul Elkins (director); narrator: Knox Manning	September 11, 1947	covers a carnival in Topeka, Kansas including Carl J. Sedlmayr's Royal American Show.
Power Behind the Nation	story: Saul Elkins; music: William Lava; narrator: Art Gilmore	October 11, 1947	History of American industry. Business Screen states that Carl Dudley co-produced
Soap Box Derby	Saul Elkins (director); music: William Lava; narrator: Knox Manning	October 18, 1947	Akron, Ohio mini-car races.
Celebration Days	Saul Elkins (director); narrator: Art Gilmore	© December 29, 1947	covers Minneapolis Aquatennial
Calgary Stampede	Saul Elkins & Herman Boxer (directors); music: William Lava; narrator: Art Gilmore	May 29, 1948	covers Stampede Week in Calgary, Alberta. Nominee for Academy Award for Best Live Action Short Film, The Adventures of Don Juan DVD
The Man from New Orleans	Luis Osorno Barona (director); music: William Lava; narrator: Art Gilmore	September 4, 1948	profiles artist William Spratling
My Own United States	DeLeon Anthony (director); music: William Lava; narrator: Truman Bradley	October 16, 1948	
Cradle of the Republic	Carl Dudley (producer/director); music: William Lava; narrator: Art Gilmore	© December 20, 1948	Overview of the New England states
Princely India	Owen Crump (director/writer); music: William Lava; narrator: Lou Marcelle	December 25, 1948	India travelogue
Heart of Paris	Owen Crump (writer); music: William Lava; narrator: Art Gilmore	March 12, 1949	
Drums of India	Owen Crump (writer); music: William Lava; narrator: Truman Bradley	April 15, 1949	
Down the Nile	Owen Crump (writer); music: William Lava; narrator: Art Gilmore	July 30, 1949	Egyptian travelogue
Jungle Terror	Hassoldt Davis & Ruth Staudinger; Owen Crump (writer); music: William Lava; narrator: Martin Gabel	November 5, 1949	covers a 1947-48 trip through French Guiana, additional unused footage can be found in the Smithsonian Archives.
Snow Carnival	André de la Varre & Dick Durrance (directors); story: Owen Crump (writer); narrator: Gary Cooper	December 17, 1949	covers skiing in Aspen, Colorado. Nominee for Academy Award for Best Live Action Short Film

=== 1950s ===
Title	Major credits	Release or copyright date	Notes
Women of Tomorrow	George George, Francis Thompson & John Flory (director/writers); narrator: Art Gilmore	March 15, 1950	(© December 31, 1949); covers Girl Scouts of the USA
Danger Is My Business	Ross Allen (herpetologist); music: William Lava; narrator: Marvin Miller	April 8, 1950	visiting the Everglades with a professional reptile handler
Wish You Were Here	music: William Lava; narrator: Art Gilmore	July 29, 1950	tour of Florida
Charlie McCarthy and Mortimer Snerd in Sweden	Larry Lansburgh (director); Edgar Bergen	September 27, 1950	
My Country 'Tis of Thee	Owen Crump (writer); music: William Lava; narrator: Marvin Miller	December 26, 1950	Nominee for Academy Award for Best Live Action Short Film. Captain Horatio Hornblower R.N. DVD
The Wanderer's Return	André de la Varre (director); story: Owen Crump (writer); narrator: Marvin Miller	December 23, 1950	Tour of the new Israel
The Neighbor Next Door	Owen Crump (writer); music: William Lava; narrator: Marvin Miller	March 17, 1951	Tour of Canada
Stranger in the Lighthouse	Larry Lansburgh (director); narrator: Art Gilmore	May 5, 1951	Tale of a girl and a seal
Enchanted Islands	Owen Crump & Edwin E. Olsen (directors); narrator: Art Gilmore	August 4, 1951	Hawaii
Winter Sports (Winter Wonders)	John Jay; narrator: Art Gilmore	September 8, 1951	Ski reel
The Seeing Eye	Owen Crump (directors); André de la Varre (camera); music: William Lava; narrator: Marvin Miller	December 14, 1951	Nominee for Academy Award for Best Live Action Short Film. A canine view of the New Jersey seeing eye dog institute
Land of the Trembling Earth	Ted & Vincent Saizis (directors); music: William Lava; narrator: Marvin Miller	January 26, 1952	covers Georgia's Okefenokee Swamp
Land of Everyday Miracles	Richard L. Bare & Paul Thoma (directors); narrator: Marvin Miller	March 8, 1952	American inventions and institutions
No Pets Allowed	Crane Wilbur (director); Warren Douglas, Fay Bainter & others	May 31, 1952	
Open Up That Golden Gate	Owen Crump (writer); music: William Lava; narrator: Lou Marcelle	July 19, 1952	San Francisco travelogue
Killers of the Swamp	André de la Varre (director); narrator: Marvin Miller	September 6, 1952	Everglades alligator, rattlesnake and bobcat
Cruise of the Zaca	Errol Flynn & Owen Crump (writer), Howard Hill	December 6, 1952	Travels with the Zaca along Pacific and in Jamaica in 1946-47. The Adventures of Robin Hood (2-disc) DVD
Thar She Blows!	D. Richard Statile (director); story: Owen Crump; music: William Lava; narrator: Art Gilmore	December 25, 1952 (preview)	Five months on a whaling vessel traveling Antarctic waters. Nominee for Academy Award for Best Live Action Short Film
Under the Little Big Top	André de la Varre (director); narrator: Art Gilmore	April 25, 1953	filmed in Sarasota, Florida
America for Me	Jerry Fairbanks (producer); Albert Kelly (director); Ellen Drew, Meg Randall & John Archer	May 30, 1953	
Where the Trade Winds Play	William Whiteman (director); Owen Crump (writer); music: William Lava	July 4, 1953	Tour of Polynesia, Tahiti
Gone Fishin'	Charles Tedford (director); narrator: Art Gilmore	September 12, 1953	
North of the Sahara	André de la Varre (director); script: Owen Crump; narrator: Marvin Miller	November 7, 1953	Tour of Tunisia & Morocco
Don't Forget to Write	André de la Varre (director); story: Owen Crump; music: William Lava; narrator: Art Gilmore	December 5, 1953	Tour of England
Winter Paradise (Alpine Safari)	John Jay (director); story: Owen Crump (writer); music: William Lava; narrator: Art Gilmore	December 26, 1953	skiing in Oberstdorf (Germany) and the Austrian Alps (filmed '51). Nominee for Academy Award for Best Live Action Short Film
Hold Your Horses	André de la Varre (director); story: Owen Crump (writer); narrator: Art Gilmore	March 13, 1954	horse breeding in Argentina
Continental Holiday	André de la Varre (director); story: Owen Crump (writer); music: William Lava; narrator: Marvin Miller	April 9, 1954	European tour utilizing clips from past shorts
Silver Lightning	Edgar Queeny (director); narrator: Paul Prentiss	July 17, 1954	fishing reel
Who's Who in the Zoo	André de la Varre (director)	August 21, 1954	US and European zoos
Mariners Ahoy!	Ray Jewell (director); Owen Crump (writer)	September 6, 1954	girls sail the Yankee with Commander Irving M. Johnson.
In Fourteen Hundred and Ninety-two	André de la Varre (director); story: Owen Crump; music: William Lava; narrator: Marvin Miller	October 9, 1954	covers Puerto Rico, Haiti, Jamaica & the Dominican Republic
Where Winter Is King	André de la Varre (director); narrator: Marvin Miller	December 4, 1954	Austria winter sports
Beauty and the Bull	Larry Lansburgh (director); narrator: Marvin Miller	December 20, 1954	features bullfighter Bette Ford in Mexico. Nominee for Academy Award for Best Live Action Short Film
The Mississippi Traveler	Carl Dudley (producer); Richard Goldstone (director);	March 5, 1955	journey along the river
Wave of the Flag	Carl Dudley (producer); Richard Goldstone (director)	May 14, 1955	touring national monuments to American wars
The Adventures of Alexander Selkirk	Jackson Winter (director);	June 18, 1955	story of a real life Robinson Crusoe
Uranium Fever	Tom McGowan (director); narrator: Vic Perrin	July 16, 1955	
Festival Days	André de la Varre (director); story: Owen Crump; narrator: Marvin Miller	August 13, 1955	shots of Germany, Austria and Italy
The Golden Tomorrow	André de la Varre (director); story: Owen Crump; narrator: Marvin Miller	November 5, 1955	Venezuela
They Seek Adventure	Jerry Fairbanks (producer); Harold D. Schuster (director); cast: Marshall Thompson, Richard Jaeckel & Walter Sande	© January 7, 1956	
Out of the Desert	Jackson Winter (director); narrator: Marvin Miller	February 4, 1956	covers Egypt
Copters and Cows	Tom McGowan (director); narrator: Marvin Miller	March 2, 1956	cattle ranching by helicopter in Vernon, Texas
The Wonders of Araby	André de la Varre (director); story: Owen Crump; narrator: Marvin Miller	June 2, 1956	Tour of the Middle East.
Miracle in the Caribbean	Hamilton Wright (producer); narrator: Marvin Miller	August 25, 1956	Puerto Rico
Playtime Pals	André de la Varre (director); narrator: Johnny Jacobs	October 27, 1956	(9 minutes) Children and sports worldwide
Howdy, Partner!	Tom McGowan (director); Owen Crump (writer); narrator: Johnny Jacobs	November 1956	Las Vegas
Pearls of the Pacific	André de la Varre (director); narrator: Marvin Miller	© March 2, 1957	Philippines
I'll Be Doggone!	André de la Varre (director); narrator: Johnny Jacobs	March 16, 1957	(9 minutes) Covers European dog shows

== See also ==
- List of short subjects by Hollywood studio#Warner Brothers

== Links ==
- "Film Daily archives". The Online Books Page.
- UCLA Film Archives Search (holds copies of many pre-1948 titles)
- Library of Congress search site (holds copies of '50s titles)
- DVD Talk review of '30s shorts in review of Vitaphone Cavalcade of Musical Comedy Shorts
