= Abraham Lincoln (1924 film short) =

1924 American sound short film

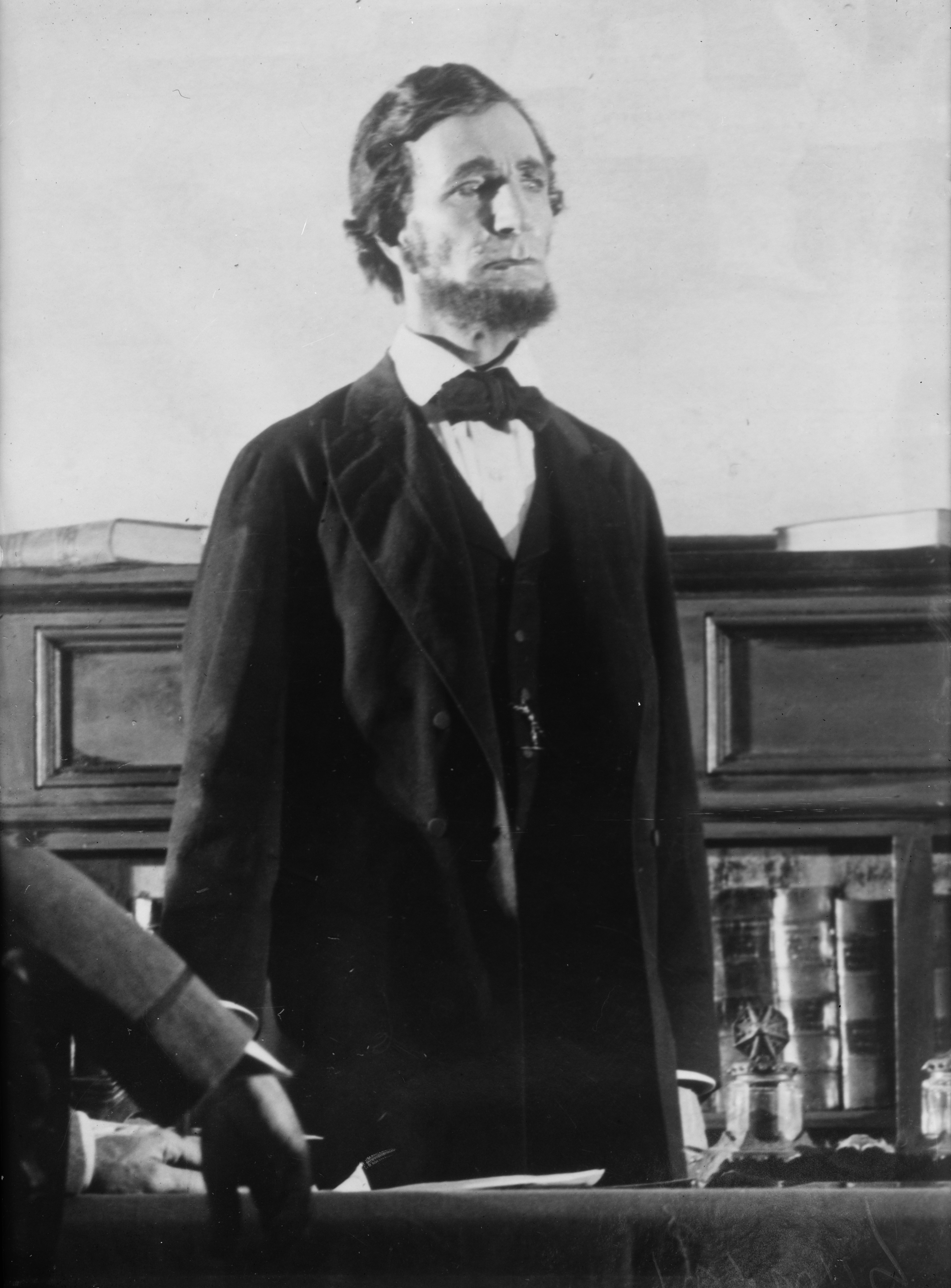
- Frank McGlynn in the Broadway production of Abraham Lincoln (1919)
- Directed by: J. Searle Dawley
- Written by: John Drinkwater (play)
- Produced by: Lee de Forest
- Starring: Frank McGlynn Sr.
- Release date: 1924
- Running time: 20 minutes
- Country: United States
- Language: English

Abraham Lincoln (1924) is a short film made in the Phonofilm sound-on-film process. The film was directed by J. Searle Dawley, produced by Lee de Forest, is based on the 1918 play Abraham Lincoln by John Drinkwater, and stars Frank McGlynn Sr. as Lincoln. McGlynn also played Lincoln in the play on Broadway.

Although no copies of the film appear to have survived, some photographs have been preserved.

In 1923, de Forest and Dawley produced a short Phonofilm, Lincoln, Man of the People, with Edwin Markham reading his poem of that title. In 1925, de Forest produced a Phonofilm, Memories of Lincoln, with 91-year-old Chauncey Depew giving his recollections of meeting Lincoln in person.

== See also ==
- Cultural depictions of Abraham Lincoln
