= The Man Behind the Gun (radio series) =

American radio war drama (1942–1944)

The Man Behind the Gun is an American radio war drama program that was broadcast on CBS October 7, 1942 - March 4, 1944. It won a Peabody Award in 1943 as the outstanding dramatic program on radio.

== Overview ==
The Man Behind the Gun was "designed to tell how the man behind the gun lives, his duties, and the stories behind the weapons he uses". Making members of the audience feel as if they were participating in combat, each episode put the listener in the position of the title character, using second-person narration to create the impression that he or she was in the situation being dramatized.

An excerpt from one episode had the radio audience hearing:

You forget sleep now. Those mortar bursts have shaken you back to life. You work fast in the dark. Boys you laughed with yesterday are sobbing in the mud with pain. In the dark you fill out the EMTs — Emergency Medical Tags.... K.I.A. — Killed in Action. That's the one you hate to make out.

That approach, sometimes called the "you-technique", virtually transported listeners out of their current environments and "into the cockpit of a fighter plan, onto the deck of a destroyer, or into a ditch on the front line". One newspaper columnist described the program's approach to the story as "taking each listener right into the midst of a grim, grimy group of men who do the bloody fighting of the nation at war". Cooperation of the armed forces of the United States helped to ensure the accuracy of the program's content.

The title character varied from episode to episode, with different military services and different ranks of personnel represented. Each episode was based on facts, but names and characteristics were fictitious. Understated scripts portrayed characters as men whom listeners might have known, "boys from down the street", rather than as heroes. Actors' abilities to re-create diverse speech patterns from across the United States added to the realism of the dramas.

== Sponsor ==
Initially broadcast on Wednesdays from 10:30 to 11 p.m. Eastern Time, The Man Behind the Gun was sustaining. Where commercials would have been inserted for a sponsored program, listeners heard public-service announcements such as an emphasis on the need for nurses. Registered nurses were asked to apply for commissions to serve overseas with the Army Medical Corps, where 2,000 nurses a month were needed. Women with no nurses' training were asked to volunteer as nurses' aides to "fill the gaps this war has made in nursing facilities here at home".

The Elgin National Watch Company began sponsoring the program on March 7, 1943. The sponsorship was accompanied by a change in nights, to Sundays, 10:30-11 p.m. E. T. Addition of a sponsor was considered a good sign in that it indicated that the program "will surely be around for a while". When Elgin took a hiatus from sponsorship in the summer of 1943, the program was moved to Saturdays from 7 to 7:30 p.m. E. T. Elgin's sponsorship resumed on September 4, 1943, with the show staying in the Saturday at 7 time slot.

== Personnel ==
Everett Sloane was the initial narrator, with Jackson Beck succeeding him. Actors heard on the program included Larry Haines, Frank Lovejoy, Paul Luther, Myron McCormick, and Bill Quinn. Bernard Herrman directed the music when the series began; he was followed by Nathan Van Cleave. William N. Robson was the producer and director. Writers included Louis Pelletier, David Harmon, Forrest Barnes, Arthur Laurents, Ranald MacDougall, Robert Lewis Shayon, and Allan Sloane.

== Episodes ==
Partial List of Episodes of The Man Behind the Gun
Date	Title	Notes
October 7, 1942	"Bath-tub Charlie"	The title was the slang term for a machine-gun operator who worked within a transparent bulge protruding from a bomber.
October 14, 1942	"The U. K. Run"	From departure in the United States to docking off Britain, the episode related activities of naval ships protecting merchant vessels in a convoy.
November 25, 1942	—	Gunners on an aircraft carrier battled planes attempting to destroy the ship.
January 20, 1943	—	Marines captured Henderson Field and established beachheads on Guadalcanal.
March 7, 1943	—	A case of appendicitis aboard a submarine deep in the Pacific Ocean resulted in a pharmacist mate's removing a fellow sailor's appendix with the use of alcohol from the head of a torpedo, a kitchen knife, spoons, and a tea strainer. The sailor was back on duty 10 days later.
April 25, 1943	"Going Home"	The Coast Guard cutter Campbell fought Nazi submarines for a day, finally ramming one of them.

== Research ==
Hands-on experience was part of the research that added authenticity to the broadcasts. Over one two-week span, MacDougall traveled on a destroyer, "taking bundles of meticulous notes" about his observations. He processed those notes while en route to and from spending time on a training submarine that experienced about eight crash dives. Robson sometimes accompanied MacDougall on research trips, as in a three-week span in October 1942 when they visited New London, Connecticut, to learn about submarines; Fort Knox, Kentucky, to gather information about tanks; and Norfolk, Virginia, to find out about aircraft carriers. Other research ventures took the two men into combat situations.

Robson considered such research to be essential for what he termed "legitimacy" of the broadcasts. He said that soldiers, sailors, and Marines who listened to the program noticed technical errors quickly and were eager to point out such flaws. He flew in bombers, fired military guns, and sailed on military ships to become familiar with the tools and the terminology used in the war. People other than active military personnel also noticed the accuracy of the sounds. John K. Hutchens wrote in The New York Times that the program "reproduces with extraordinary fidelity the sounds and mechanics of war"

By February 1943 Robson had traveled approximately 10,000 miles, spending hundreds of hours in war conditions to be able to relate accurately the experiences of military personnel. McDougall's efforts to achieve accuracy included compiling a dictionary of the way orders were given in each branch of the military.

The program's sound-effects people also visited "Army stations, Navy boot camps, Marine bases, airfields, all sorts of service schools" to ensure that they used appropriate sounds in broadcasts. Robson said that military men would quickly notice if the sound of a wrong-sized gun were used on the air, and they would point out the error if a script had the wrong weapon used in a situation. Sounds compiled for the program ranged from an aircraft carrier's bullhorn to "the sound of the swivel on a troop-carrying plane as paratroopers jump".

== Production ==
The first draft of each script had to be completed no later than a week before the broadcast date to allow military authorities time to check the script's facts and censor it if necessary. A working draft had to be ready by three days prior to broadcast so that Robson could prepare appropriately.

Radio historian Tim DeForest wrote that Robson "was known as an authoritarian — if he wanted something done a certain way, then you'd by golly better do it that way. But the quality of his work during his long career indicates pretty clearly that his way was darn good." Another radio historian, John Dunning, wrote, "Timing was everything: in the battle scenes, the actors, narrator, music, and sound had to be coordinated and cued 'literally on a split-second.'" Such precision required two days' rehearsal, which led to Sloane's leaving the show. He was busy with other programs and told Robson, "I just don't need that much rehearsal", to which Robson replied, "Everett, I know you don't, but I do."

Music was "a vital feature of the show", with the style varying "from Wagner to jive", depending on the mood to be supported. Some episodes' scores were complete original compositions by Van Cleave. Robson's insistence on controlling selection of music resulted in Herrmann's being replaced by Van Cleave.

One studio observer of a broadcast of The Man Behind the Gun compared Robson's directing to a maestro's directing an orchestra, as he used both hands to bring in voices, music, and sound effects at appropriate times. His efforts to enhance the realism of broadcasts included placing two 18-inch speakers in the studio, located so that actors heard sound effects through them but microphones did not pick up those sounds. Robson said, "Now when the guns went off, the actors had to yell to hear themselves. When the planes went off with four motors going, they had to yell to be heard above it, and the actuality was magnificent."

== Critical response ==
A review in the trade publication Variety called the premiere episode "an engrossing show, alive with atmosphere and crammed with action," and added, "It was expertly produced. with excellent sound effects and a number of vibrant performances." The review noted the effectiveness of depiction of chatter among crew members aboard a bomber and commanding officers' instructions to the crew before the flight. It also highlighted "the musical punctuation and the descriptive battle sound effects". A Variety review of a later episode said that the program was "a scintillating example of good writing matched to good direction" and added that it was instructional and inspirational for listeners.

The trade publication Billboard called the program's second episode "a stark yet thrilling account of what may be going on at this very moment in the middle of the Atlantic". The episode reviewed related the story of a sailor in the merchant marine who was rescued after his ship was hit by a torpedo during a convoy. The review cited the seaman's "colorful language" and "casual conversation ... in the midst of the U-boat peril". It said, "The story, acting, sound effects and presentation were uniformly good, and all added up to some pretty effective propaganda." A subsequent review in Billboard, after the program gained a sponsor, indicated that the show had improved, citing integration of commercials in a way that would "whet listeners' appetite for what followed". The review said that the broadcast version of the story (an appendectomy performed by a pharmacist's mate on a submarine while it was beneath the surface in Japanese waters) was better than the version that had already appeared in newspapers. It cited the work of MacDougall, Robson, Beck, and the cast in their respective roles in creating the broadcast version.

Writing in The New York Times, Hutchens praised MacDougall's writing ("terse, colorful, realistic" dialogue "... shot through with hardboiled and honest humor"), Robson's producing and directing, and actors' performances. He pointed out the significance of teamwork between MacDougall and Robson, with "no real division point" where one's contributions ended and the other's began. He concluded, "... like all good theatre on stage or air, [The Man Behind the Gun] has flow and vitality".

== Recognition ==
The Man Behind the Gun received a Peabody Award in 1943 for "outstanding entertainment in drama". The award noted the program's role in "intensifying 'our appreciation of what the men in action are up against'".
