= The Seeing Eye (film) =

1951 film

- Directed by: Owen Crump
- Produced by: Gordon Hollingshead
- Narrated by: Marvin Miller
- Cinematography: André de la Varre
- Distributed by: Warner Bros.
- Release date: December 1951
- Country: United States
- Language: English

The Seeing Eye is a 1951 American short documentary film produced by Gordon Hollingshead in Technicolor as a Technicolor Special about The Seeing Eye, a guide dog training school in Morristown, New Jersey. It was nominated for an Academy Award for Best Documentary Short. The Seeing Eye was preserved by the Academy Film Archive in 2006.

Among previous film short documentaries on the same subject are two other titles sporting the same title:

- Also for Warner Brothers, but produced by Jerome Hillman as part of the Broadway Brevities series, running 19 minutes and released April 5, 1941.
- Produced by Educational Film Exchanges, Inc., supervised by Clinton Wunder, running 10 minutes and released January 17, 1936 as part of the "Treasure Chest" series.
