= Valley of Wanted Men =

1935 film by Alan James

- Directed by: Alan James
- Written by: Peter B. Kyne (story "All for Love"); Barry Barringer (adaptation and screenplay); Forrest Barnes (dialogue)
- Produced by: Maurice Conn (producer)
- Starring: See below
- Cinematography: Arthur Reed
- Edited by: Richard G. Wray
- Production company: Conn Pictures
- Distributed by: Ambassador Pictures
- Release date: October 20, 1935
- Running time: 62 minutes
- Country: United States
- Language: English

Valley of Wanted Men, also known as Wanted Men in the United Kingdom, is a 1935 American Western film directed by Alan James.

== Plot ==
Three dangerous convicts—Larry Doyle, Kelly Dillon, and Mike Masters—escape from the state penitentiary in a daring nighttime breakout. Law enforcement quickly mobilizes a widespread manhunt, broadcasting alerts across the region. Among the escapees is Doyle (LeRoy Mason), a former bank cashier wrongfully convicted of robbery, who now seeks to prove his innocence and expose the real culprit: suave and corrupt financier Ralph Dexter (Walter Miller).

The pursuit leads the convicts to Pleasant Valley, home of the Sanderson Lodge, where Dexter is staying. Unbeknownst to the authorities, Dexter was the true mastermind behind the bank robbery and framed Doyle to cover his tracks. Complicating matters is Dexter’s engagement to Sally Sanderson (Drue Leyton), Doyle’s former sweetheart.

Doyle makes contact with Sally’s younger brother, Slivers (Frankie Darro), who still believes in Doyle’s innocence. Disguised as a ranger, Doyle attempts to elude capture and gather evidence against Dexter, even as Dillon and Masters grow more dangerous and unpredictable.

As the convicts take Sally hostage and retreat to a remote mountain cabin, tensions rise. A final confrontation ensues when Doyle forces Dexter into a showdown, exposing his crimes and locating the stolen money hidden in the hills. With the help of Slivers and sympathetic ranger Fred (Grant Withers), Doyle clears his name.

The film ends with the criminals either dead or apprehended, Dexter under arrest, and Doyle exonerated. Reunited with Sally, Doyle looks forward to a future free from injustice and betrayal.

== Cast ==
- Frankie Darro as Slivers Sanderson
- LeRoy Mason as Larry Doyle
- Russell Hopton as Kelly Dillon
- Grant Withers as Fred (a Ranger)
- Drue Leyton as Sally Sanderson
- Paul Fix as Mike Masters
- Walter Miller as Ralph Dexter
- Fred "Snowflake" Toones as Snowflake
- Al Bridge as Ranger Sergeant Parsons
- William Gould as Prison Warden
- Jack Rockwell as U. S. Marshal
- Slim Whitaker as Deputy
- Frank Rice as Ned (storekeeper)

== Soundtrack ==
- Irene Crane - "Livin' in the Sunshine" (Written by Chantelle Duhig and Louis Duhig)
- Irene Crane - "A Living Room, Kitchen and Bath" (Written by Chantelle Duhig and Louis Duhig)
