= Lincoln in the White House =

1939 film directed by William C. McGann

- Frank McGlynn Sr. (right) as Lincoln in the 1939 short
- Directed by: William McGann
- Written by: Charles Tedford
- Starring: Frank McGlynn, Sr. Dickie Moore
- Cinematography: Wilfred M. Cline; Natalie Kalmus (color)
- Edited by: Everett Dodd
- Music by: Howard Jackson (uncredited)
- Production company: Warner Bros.
- Distributed by: Warner Bros.
- Release date: February 11, 1939
- Running time: 21 minutes
- Country: United States
- Language: English

Lincoln in the White House is a 1939 American biographical short or historical "special" about United States President Abraham Lincoln, highlighting events during his first term of office, from his inaugural speech in 1861 to his delivery of the Gettysburg Address in 1863. Produced by Warner Bros. and directed by William C. McGann, the 21-minute Technicolor film stars Frank McGlynn Sr., a veteran actor who since 1915 had specialized in impersonating Lincoln on both stage and screen.

== Plot ==
"...here is a picture that is not only an honor but a duty for every theater to show...."

— The Film Daily, 1939

The film begins with Lincoln (Frank McGlynn Sr.) delivering part of his presidential inaugural speech in Washington, D.C., on March 4, 1861. The next scene, six weeks later, is in the White House, where the president is talking with his wife Mary (Nana Bryant). Suddenly their young son Tad (Dickie Moore) and Lincoln's assistant John Hay (John Harron) rush in to report that Confederate forces had bombarded Fort Sumter in South Carolina. The president, saddened by the news, kneels with Tad to pray for the nation.

The story moves to December 1862, with Lincoln discussing the importance of the Emancipation Proclamation prior to its release. That scene transitions to July 1863, to Lincoln's cabinet members bickering about the president's war strategy, when news arrives of the Union army's victory at Gettysburg. As the men celebrate, Lincoln comes in to defend again his policies. Later in the White House, the president plays with Tad on the floor before meeting with a Mrs. Scott (Sibyl Harris). She is there to plead for the life of her son, a young soldier who is to be executed for falling asleep while on sentry duty with the Wisconsin infantry at Gettysburg. Lincoln's secretary of war, Edwin Stanton (Raymond Brown), now enters and threatens to resign if the soldier is pardoned. Lincoln calms Stanton and then assures Mrs. Scott he will pardon her son.

The film now advances to November 1863. Tad is seriously ill, and his father, mother, and the attending doctor (Edward LeSaint) worry at his bedside. The president fears for his son's life, but he must depart for Gettysburg to take part in the dedication of the battlefield cemetery there. Once at the town, Lincoln stays in the home of attorney David Wills (Earl Dwire). That evening, while editing his speech for the dedication, the president instructs the army band outside to play "Dixie", a song deeply associated with the American South. A crowd in the street initially objects to the choice but begins cheering when the band performs what Lincoln calls a "mighty fine tune". The next day at the ceremony, as celebrated orator Edward Everett (Gordon Hart) concludes his two-hour speech, Lincoln receives a telegram from Mary informing him that Tad is "much improved", news that noticeably relieves the president. He now stands and delivers his own speech, which lasts less than three minutes. At the end of his brief but historic address, the image of Lincoln's face fades out, gradually replaced by an American flag fluttering in the wind and accompanied musically by a rousing excerpt from the "Battle Hymn of the Republic".

== Cast ==
- Frank McGlynn Sr. as Abraham Lincoln
- Dickie Moore as Tad Lincoln
- John Harron as John Hay, Lincoln's assistant
- Raymond Brown as Secretary of War Edwin Stanton
- Erville Alderson as Secretary of State William H. Seward
- Sibyl Harris as Mrs. Scott
- Nana Bryant as Mary Todd Lincoln (uncredited)
- Earl Dwire as David Wills (uncredited)
- Gordon Hart as Edward Everett (uncredited)
- Edward LeSaint as The Physician (uncredited)

== Production ==
This short is one production in a series of Technicolor two-reel historical "specials" released by Warner Bros. between 1936 and 1940. Four other such color shorts on American history were released by the studio in 1939 after Lincoln in the White House. Their subjects include the Sons of Liberty, the Monroe Doctrine, the Bill of Rights, and Andrew Jackson (under the title Old Hickory).

Costuming is one of the short's "ultra" production values that critics compliment in their 1939 reviews. Milo Anderson, a costumer for Warner Bros. since 1933, was responsible for the wardrobes in Lincoln in the White House. His work on this project is just one of at least 42 films he "attired" for Warner Bros. between 1937 and the latter months of 1939.

Filming the color short was essentially divided into two distinct parts: Wilfrid M. Cline served as chief cinematographer and Natalie Kalmus served as director of Technicolor, a color process that required special patented cameras that studios had to rent from the Technicolor Company. Those rentals also required that a representative from the company's "Advisory Service" be on site to oversee every production's color "palette". Kalmus was the company's representative on Lincoln in the White House. By 1939, the Technicolor process had improved substantially in quality since its first commercial use in Hollywood productions 17 years earlier; nevertheless, filming with the required cameras still demanded numerous and precise adjustments to lighting and careful color selections of set content in order to attain reasonably accurate and visually appealing reproductions of colors on a film's final print. Kalmus therefore worked closely with Milo Anderson in selecting costumes and with Charles Novi, the short's art director, in choosing rugs, curtains, upholsteries, and other set furnishings deemed acceptable to her in both color and tone.

== Release ==
Officially released in 1939 on February 11—the day before Lincoln's birthday in 1809—the film is one example of Hollywood's ongoing interest in the 1930s in portraying "The Great Emancipator". Just between 1935 and 1940, Hollywood studios released no fewer than 17 productions with Lincoln as either the central subject or as an important supporting figure. Previews of this "screen miniature" became available to critics and to audiences at select theaters by mid-January 1939, nearly a full month before the film's official release. Also, rarely were "world premieres" afforded to a short, as with Lincoln in the White House. The Film Daily and other film-industry publications announced in early January that such a premiere would be held in New York City on Lincoln's birthday, the day before the general release.

== Reception ==
When comparing the print media's coverage of feature films and shorts, rarely did newspapers, trade papers, and fan magazines in the 1930s devote equal attention and column space to reviewing the latter. Many publications did so, however, in the case of Lincoln in the White House. The film in 1939 received consistently high praise from critics for its "dignified and magnificent" content, for McGlynn's performance as Lincoln, and, as noted, its production values. Abel Green, editor for the influential New York-based trade paper Variety, published his lengthy reaction to the short after attending a preview the week of January 12. It reads in part:

...A corking cast, canny pacing and ultra production re-creates a cross-section of Lincolniana that's surefire in American theatres, and certain to command respect and attention before any English-speaking audience. The blase Music Hall audience salvoed this film like it was the 4th of July. It's a natural, of course, now amidst the world strife between democratic and demagogic advocates, but at all times it is sound entertainment and forthright Americanism.

In their reviews in 1939, Variety and other trade papers focus considerable attention on the portrayal of the title character. "Frank McGlynn, Sr.," states the Motion Picture Herald, "whose portrayal of the President has become almost second nature to him, plays his part with sympathetic and effective feeling." The Film Daily heaps even greater praise on McGlynn's performance and predicts the production's emotional impact on audiences:

For here is footage aflame with the warming fires of patriotism, and no onlooker with a seed of love for America, its traditions and ideals, can suppress the emotional and prideful thrills which the chosen episodes in the life of Lincoln evoke with irresistible force. Frank McGlynn Sr., renowned for his brilliant portrayals of Lincoln, plays the title role with masterful understanding and finesse....
