= Warner Featurettes =

Warner Featurettes were an imprint for featurettes released by Warner Brothers.

A featurette is a motion picture with a running time between a half hour and 50 minutes in length, too short to be labeled a feature and often considered too long to be labelled a short film.

Warner Brothers released several of these between 1953 and 1964. Although the trade periodicals like The Film Daily and BoxOffice occasionally listed the two-reel "Warner Specials" (actually Technicolor Specials and Broadway Brevities) as "featurettes", the term usually applied to Warner shorts lasting a full half hour or longer.

== Overview ==
A decade earlier, the studio cut down a Technicolor documentary, Pledge to Bataan, initially shown at 54 minutes in 1943, and released it as a 20 minute Technicolor Special on February 3, 1945. At the time, theater exhibitors preferred receiving their short films packaged by series.

By the 1950s, however, the success of Walt Disney and others with such series as the True-Life Adventures made the "extra length" short subject fashionable as a double bill presentation. The terms varied according to references, with a longer than usual Deep Adventure occasionally labeled a feature.

Two titles hosted by Jack Webb of Dragnet fame, 24 Hour Alert and The John Glenn Story, were Academy Award nominees.

Also between 1958 and 1961, Warner Brothers produced four of The Bell System Science Series for television, but utilizing longtime short film director/writer Owen Crump.

== List of titles ==
Title	Major credits	Running time	Release, copyright or review date	Notes
Black Fury	Ted & Vincent Saizis (directors); music: Howard Jackson & William Lava; narrators: John Brown & Marvin Miller	32 minutes	September 9, 1953	Profile of David Da Lie, naturalist and vet in Okefenokee Swamp, Georgia.
Production Report by Jack Warner		25 minutes	March 1955	Technically a promotional
You in Italy		about 40 minutes	June 1955	Made for the U.S. Signal Corps
24 Hour Alert	Mark VII co-production, Cedric Francis (producer); Robert Leeds (director); music: William Lava; hosted by Jack Webb & Art Balinger	31 minutes	December 22, 1955	Profiles jet operations with the US Air Force. Nominee for Academy Award for Best Live Action Short Film
Chasing the Sun	producer: Cedric Francis; André de la Varre (director); Owen Crump & Charles Tedford (writers); music: Howard Jackson	31 minutes	February 1956	Tour of Miami and Silver Springs, Florida
Deep Adventure	producer: Cedric Francis; Scotty Wellbourn (director); Ross Allen, William Fuller & Dottie Lee Phillips; story: Owen Crump (writer); narrator: Johnny Jacobs	46 minutes	May 1957	Sunken treasure adventure shot in Florida
Forbidden Desert	producer: Cedric Francis; Jackson Winter (director); narrator: Marvin Miller; Rafik Shammas	45 minutes	December 21, 1957	Travelogue of Saudi Arabia and biography of John Lewis Burckhardt
Israel	Leon Uris (producer); Sam Zebba (director); music: Elmer Bernstein; narrator: Edward G. Robinson	30 minutes	February 20, 1959	CinemaScope travelogue sponsored by the Israel Bond Organization
A Force of Readiness	William L. Hendricks (producer); narrator: Jack Webb	26 minutes	May 25, 1961	Co-produced by the U.S. marines
The Misery Merchants	Cedric Francis (producer); story: William K. Wells	29 minutes	December 1961	Shot in black & white, documentary for the Arthritis & Rheumatism Foundation
The John Glenn Story	co-produced by National Aeronautics & Space Administration; William L. Hendricks (producer); narrator: Jack Webb	30 minutes	December 1962	Nominee for Academy Award for Best Live Action Short Film
Sea Power	William L. Hendricks (producer)	25 minutes	September 1964	Made for the U.S. marines

== See also ==
- List of American live-action shorts#Warner Bros.
