= Western Gold =

1937 film by Howard Bretherton

- Theatrical release poster
- Directed by: Howard Bretherton
- Screenplay by: Earle Snell; Forrest Barnes
- Based on: Helen of the Old House by Harold Bell Wright
- Produced by: Sol Lesser
- Starring: Smith Ballew; Heather Angel; LeRoy Mason; Howard Hickman; Ben Alexander; Frank McGlynn, Sr. Otis Harlan
- Cinematography: Harry Neumann
- Edited by: Arthur Hilton; Carl Pierson
- Production company: 20th Century Fox
- Distributed by: 20th Century Fox
- Release date: August 27, 1937
- Running time: 57 minutes
- Country: United States
- Language: English

Western Gold is a 1937 American Western film directed by Howard Bretherton and written by Earle Snell and Forrest Barnes. The film stars Smith Ballew, Heather Angel, LeRoy Mason, Howard Hickman, Ben Alexander, Frank McGlynn, Sr. and Otis Harlan. The film was released on August 27, 1937, by 20th Century Fox.

== Plot ==
Bill Gibson is asked if he can stop the holdups of a needed gold shipment, when everyone refuses to take out the shipment due to all the killings, Bill volunteers.

== Cast ==
- Smith Ballew as Bill Gibson
- Heather Angel as Jeannie Thatcher
- LeRoy Mason as Fred Foster
- Howard Hickman as Thatcher
- Ben Alexander as Bart
- Frank McGlynn, Sr. as Abraham Lincoln
- Otis Harlan as Jake
- Victor Potel as Jasper
- Lew Kelly as Storekeeper Ezra
- Al Bridge as Holman
- Tom London as Clem
