= Abraham Lincoln (play) =

John Drinkwater play

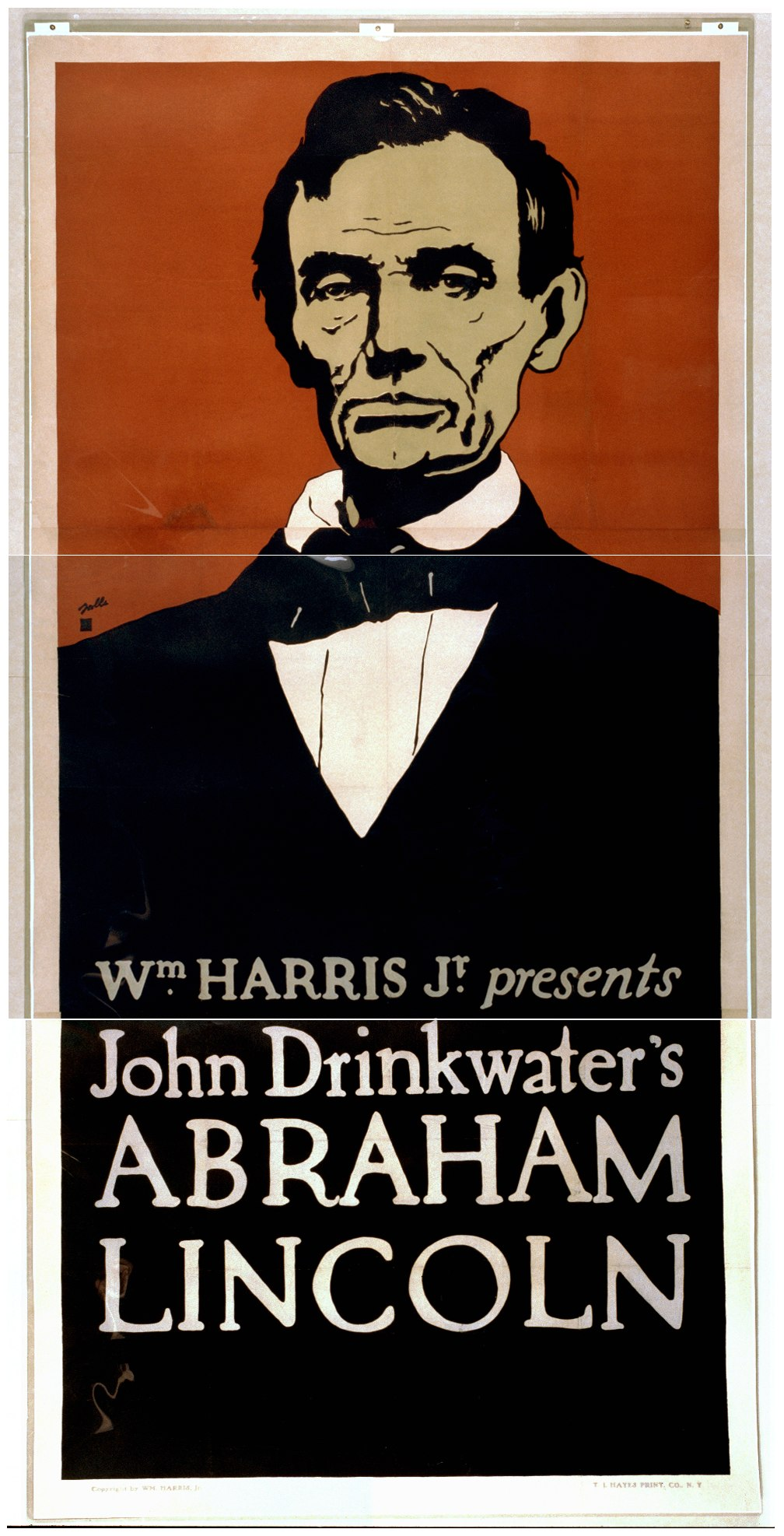
- Poster for the Broadway production (1919)
- Original language: English
- Written by: John Drinkwater

Premiere
- Date: October 1918
- Place: Birmingham Repertory Theatre, Birmingham, England

Abraham Lincoln is a 1918 play by John Drinkwater about the 16th President of the United States. Drinkwater's first great success, it premiered in England in 1918. The 1919 Broadway production starred Frank McGlynn.

== Production ==
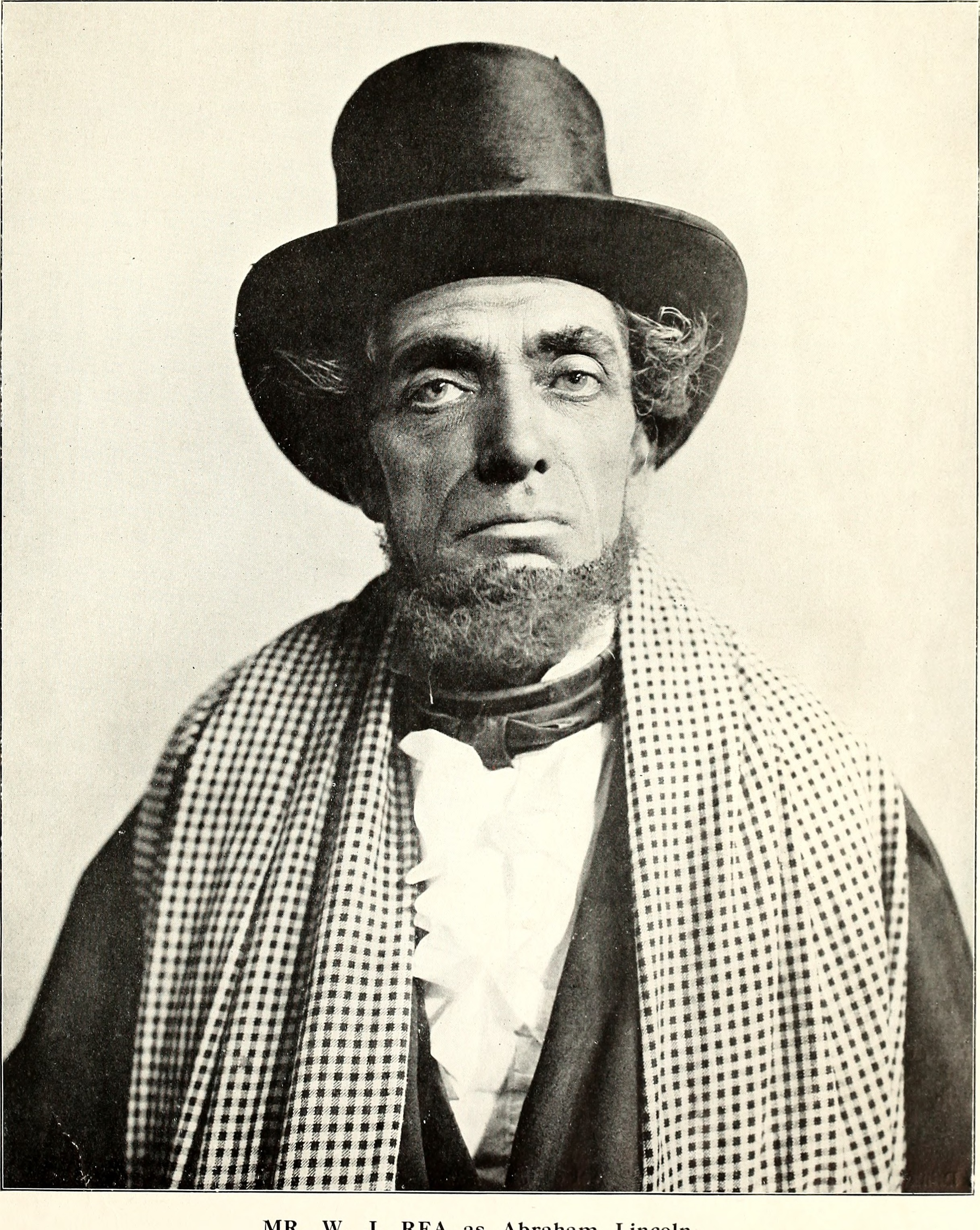
William J. Rea in the London production of Abraham Lincoln

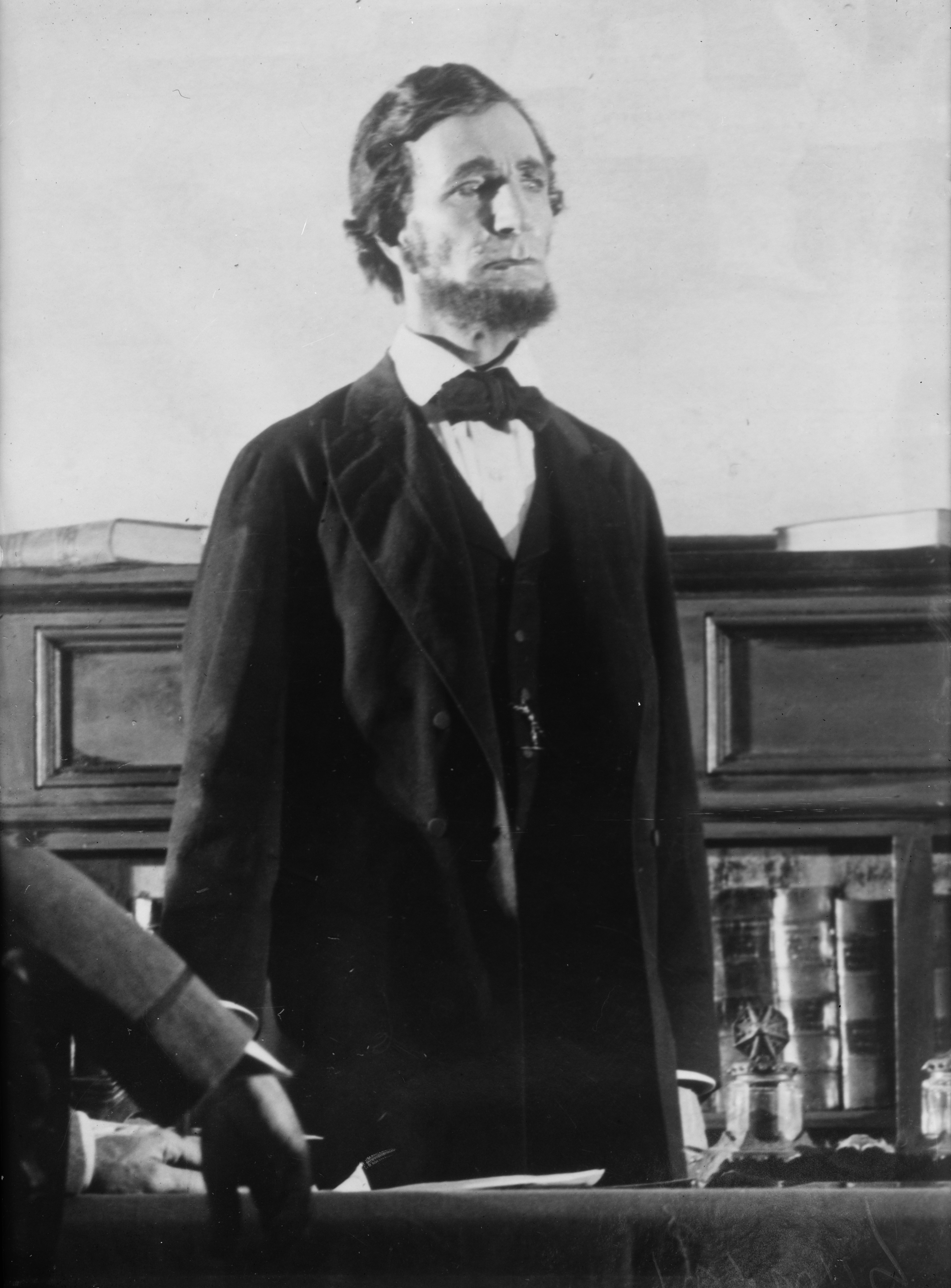
Frank McGlynn in the Broadway production of Abraham Lincoln (1919)

A rare depiction of events in the life of a U.S. President by a British playwright, Abraham Lincoln was a great success in its day. The play covers events in Lincoln's Presidency from his election in 1860 to his assassination, but omits most of the events in his private life.

Abraham Lincoln was first produced in October 1918 at the Birmingham Repertory Theatre, of which John Drinkwater was the artistic director. Arnold Bennett and Nigel Playfair acquired the play and its company for the suburban Hammersmith Playhouse, where Abraham Lincoln became a sensational success with London audiences. Irish actor William J. Rea starred.

Produced by William Harris Jr., the Broadway production of Abraham Lincoln opened December 15, 1919, at the Cort Theatre, and ran for 193 performances. Lester Lonergan directed a cast including the following:

== Broad cast ==
- Leonard Mudie as Chronicler
- Florence Johns as Susan, a Maid
- Winifred Hanley as Mrs. Lincoln
- Frank McGlynn as Mr. Lincoln
- Forrest Davis as William Tucker, a Merchant
- Duncan Cherry as Elias Price, a Lay Preacher
- Penwood Batkins as James MacIntosh, a Journalist
- John S. O'Brien as William H. Seward, Secretary of State
- Charles Fleming as Johnson White, Confederate Commissioner
- William R. Randall as Caleb Jennings, Confederate Commissioner
- Paul Byron as John Hay, Lincoln's Secretary
- Frank E. Jamison as Salmon P. Chase, Secretary of the Treasury
- Herbert Curtis as Simon Cameron, Secretary of War, 1862
- Alfred Moore as Gideon Welles, Secretary of the Navy
- William A. Norton as Burnet Hook, a Member of the Cabinet
- David Landau as Edwin M. Stanton, Secretary of War, 1865
- J. Philip Jerome as Messenger
- Mary Horne Morrison as Mrs. Goliath Blow
- Charles S. Gilpin as William Custis
- Albert Phillips as General Ulysses S. Grant, Commander of the Federal Army
- George Williams as Captain Mallins, Grant's aide-de-camp
- Charles P. Bates as Dennis, an Orderly
- Raymond Hackett as William Scott, a Soldier
- Frank Ginter as General Meade, Field Commander, Federal Forces
- Thomas Irwin as Captain Stone, Meade's aide-de-camp
- James Durkin as General Robert E. Lee, Commander of the Confederate Army
- J. Paul Jones as John Wilkes Booth

== Adaptations ==
In 1924, a two-reel sound film version of the play was filmed by Lee De Forest in his Phonofilm sound-on-film process. Frank McGlynn reprised his Broadway role.

In Czechoslovakia the play was broadcast on radio on November 8, 1937. Directed by Miloslav Jares, the production starred Frantisek Salzer in the role of Abraham Lincoln.

Abraham Lincoln was adapted as the sixth episode of the CBS Radio series The Mercury Theatre on the Air, broadcast August 15, 1938. The cast included Orson Welles (Abraham Lincoln), Ray Collins (Grant), Edward Jerome (General Lee) George Coulouris (Hook), Joseph Cotten (Seward), Carl Frank (Scott), Karl Swenson (Hay), William Alland (Dennis) and Agnes Moorehead (Mrs. Lincoln).

On May 26, 1952, the play was presented on television on the anthology series Studio One. Starring Robert Pastene and Judith Evelyn, the TV adaptation was notable for featuring actor James Dean in the small but significant role of William Scott, a Union soldier court-martialed and condemned to death for falling asleep on watch. The live production survived on kinescope and is available at the Internet Archive.

== Translations ==
- In 1969, Moti BA translated this play in Bhojpuri language.

== See also ==
- Abraham Lincoln (1924 film short), two-reel short film made by Lee DeForest in Phonofilm
