= Give Me Liberty (1936 film) =

1936 film by B. Reeves Eason

- Directed by: B. Reeves Eason
- Written by: Forrest Barnes
- Starring: John Litel; Nedda Harrigan
- Cinematography: W. Howard Greene
- Edited by: Louis Hesse
- Music by: M.K. Jerome, Jack Scholl
- Production company: The Vitaphone Corporation
- Distributed by: Warner Bros. Pictures
- Release date: December 19, 1936
- Running time: 22 minutes
- Country: United States
- Language: English

Give Me Liberty is a 1936 American drama short film directed by B. Reeves Eason. The short covers a short period of time in the life of Patrick Henry, leading to his 1775 "Give me liberty or give me death!" speech before the Second Virginia Convention. The film won an Academy Award at the 9th Academy Awards for Best Short Subject (Color) of 1936.

== Cast ==
- John Litel as Patrick Henry
- Nedda Harrigan as Doxie Henry
- Carlyle Moore Jr. as Captain Milton
- Robert Warwick as George Washington
- George Irving as Thomas Jefferson
- Boyd Irwin as British Commissioner
- Gordon Hart as Anti-Rebel Delegate Speaker
- Myrtle Stedman as Martha Washington
- Shirley Lloyd as Party Guest Giving Patrick a Violin
- Ted Osborne as Randolph Peyton (as Theodore Osborne)
- Carrie Daumery as Party Guest
- Jesse Graves as Moses (Washington's servant)
- Wade Lane as Judge
- Charles Frederick Lindsley as Narrator
- Wilfred Lucas as His Excellency, permitting Henry's arrest
- Jack Mower as Gentleman
- Bancroft Owen as Tom
- Paul Panzer as Man with fur hat
- Sam Rice as Convention delegate extra
- John J. Richardson as Man kneeling to trip the Commissioner
- Cyril Ring as Delegate shouting "Treason! Treason!"
- Lottie Williams as Party guest at the Henrys'
- William Worthington as Pendleton

== See also ==
- List of films about the American Revolution
