= Forrest Barnes =

American radio writer and actor

- Born: William Forest Barnes; June 11, 1905; Chicago, Illinois, U.S.
- Died: October 20, 1951 (aged 46); Salinas, California, U.S.
- Education: Senn High School; Major School of Acting
- Occupations: playwright; radio writer; screenwriter; stage actor
- Spouse: Evelyn Bolster (m. 1936; died 1951)
- Writing career
- Language: English
- Years active: 1927 – 1951

Forrest William Barnes (born William Forest Barnes; July 11, 1905 – October 20, 1951) was an American radio writer, producer and actor, a screenwriter, and a stage actor and director. Perhaps best known for John Barrymore's radio mini-series, Streamlined Shakespeare, Barnes also scripted shows such as Old Gold Hour, Stars Over Hollywood, The Man Behind the Gun, First Nighter, The Alex Templeton Show and Hollywood Playhouse, and as well as a series of historically themed short films produced by Warner Brothers, and the series premiere of the TV variety show, Ford Festival.

== Life and career ==
A native of Chicago, Illinois, Barnes was the youngest of two sons born to Sylvanus Warren Barnes and Louise Hart Blodgett. He attended Senn High School and later the Major School of Acting in Los Angeles.

Beginning in 1932, Barnes worked at radio station KMPC in Beverly Hills, both as an announcer and as the writer and narrator of his own weekly series, Famous Operas. The following year, he was promoted to program manager.

In 1934, Barnes moved to KFWB, where he produced a weekly series of historical plays, The American Parade. In September, Broadcasting reported that he had moved to KFI, as the writer/producer of numerous shows, including his American history series, as well another, simply titled Makers of History.

In January 1936, at KECA in Los Angeles, Barnes directed a live, on-air performance of Othello, in its entirety, featuring Lindsay MacHarrie in the title role and Mary Jane Higby as Desdemona and Bret Morrison as Iago.

In November 1940, Barnes was elected national president of the Radio Writers' Guild.

Throughout his career (extending from the initial stock company tours through his tenure, not quite two decades later, as actor-director of the Palo Alto Community Players), Barnes retained an ongoing commitment to performing, and to live theater. Highlights of that onstage career include portrayals of 'Maxim' de Winter in Rebecca, of the "burnt-out movie director" in Kay Van Riper's Cantina, of "Pat"—to his real-life wife's "Mabel"—in Three Men on a Horse, and of Sheridan Whiteside, the Alexander Woollcott-modeled protagonist of The Man Who Came to Dinner. Reviewing the latter performance, Palo Alto Times critic Dorothy Nichols notes that "Woollcott playing Woollcott doubled the joke in San Francisco, but Forrest Barnes, without reliance on rotundity, makes his own characterization.

He holds the key to Sheridan Whiteside in an unending relish for all sensation, whether a bit of dripping sentimentality, a juicy murder, a genuine love affair, a bold stand, a touch of genius, or a bite of food. [...] Without this gusto he would become an insufferable impertinence, for he belongs to the decade when the calculated insult was the highest form of wit, but with it he is a lovable devil. Barnes' tone of voice on the telephone, his laugh, his eager ear and susceptible eye convey the man's relish of a situation, and his savage ruthlessness is mainly a defense against bores.

As for writing, one particularly intriguing—albeit ultimately unrealized—project was Goodbye Uncle Tom, envisioned as a socially conscious musical reimagining of Harriet Beecher Stowe's Uncle Tom's Cabin, with Barnes assisting Essie Robeson—wife of Paul—in providing the book and conductor/composer David Broekman handling the music. Despite respective 1944 news reports of "an early summer production" and "an upcoming Broadway production" (with erstwhile Orson Welles trouper Maurice Ellis set to star), adaptation evidently proved a lengthier process than anticipated, and the finished product was eventually nixed—as excessively "ponderous"—by producer Herman Shumlin, and the project was ultimately abandoned.

== Political activity ==
During the 1948 U.S. presidential race, Barnes was an outspoken opponent of Harry Truman and supporter of Truman's vice presidential predecessor Henry Wallace. According to a November 1937 Palo Alto Times piece recounting a hotly contested meeting of that city's Democratic Club, Barnes drew "a burst of crackling applause" with his retort to Truman supporters, urging members to opt instead for "a man of stature."

I'm sorry. I cannot go along with the rather hopeless philosophy of Mr. McDonald. I don't want Truman! I don't want his lip service to Roosevelt, and his actions in favor of the men he is supposed to be opposing.

== Personal life and death ==
Beginning on May 30, 1936, and for the remainder of his life, Barnes was married to novelist, actress and—on at least one occasion—onstage co-star, Evelyn Bolster, with whom he would raise three sons, including one from Bolster's previous marriage.

On October 18, 1951, it was reported that a benefit performance was to be staged for Barnes, who had recently contracted poliomyelitis and was "fighting for his life" at Salinas County Hospital. On October 20, the day of the planned fundraiser, Barnes lost that fight. Survived by his wife and children, the late actor was paid a tacit tribute the following month by CBS-TV and two "old friends," Vincent Price and Hans Conried, the respective star and director of Stars Over Hollywood's November 17 broadcast of the Barnes teleplay, "Challenge to Glory".

== Works ==
=== Radio ===
Year	Title	Role	Notes
1932	Famous Operas	Creator, writer, narrator	
1934–	Ladies Laugh Last	Creator, writer, producer	
1935–1936	First Nighter "The King of Shadows"	Writer	
1937	Thrills	Creator, writer	
1937	Streamlined Shakespeare	Creator, writer	Mini-series feat. John Barrymore in six 45-minute adaptations.
1937	The Life of Byron; Ep. 12/13/37	Actor, John Hanson	
1939, 1951	Stars Over Hollywood; Ep. "Breathes There a Man" & "Challenge to Glory"	Writer	
1939	Hollywood Playhouse; Ep. "Broadway Miracle" & "Manhattan Serenade"	Writer	
1939	The Alex Templeton Show	Writer	
1939—1943	The Little Stranger	Creator, writer	Christmas special aired annually on KFI
1941	The Great Gunns	Creator, writer	
1942	Alias John Freedom	Creator, writer	
1942–1944	The Man Behind the Gun	Writer	
1946	This Is My Best; Ep. "For Always"	Writer	

=== Filmography ===
- Valley of Wanted Men (1935)
- Song of a Nation (1936)
- Give Me Liberty (1936)
- Under Southern Stars (1937)
- The Romance of Robert Burns (1937)
- Western Gold (1937)
- The Man Without a Country (1937)
- Ford Festival (1951) Series premiere – Writer
