= Gypsy Sweetheart =

Gypsy Sweetheart (1935)
- Directed by: Ralph Staub
- Written by: Joe Traub
- Produced by: Samuel Sax
- Starring: Eddie Shubert; Phillip Reed; Wini Shaw; Howard C. Hickman; Margaret Dumont; Robert Homans; Fred Kelsey
- Cinematography: William V. Skall Filmed in Technicolor
- Music by: Leo F. Forbstein
- Distributed by: Warner Brothers
- Release date: March 30, 1935
- Running time: 21 minutes
- Country: United States
- Language: English

Gypsy Sweetheart is a 1935 Vitaphone short comedy film released by Warner Brothers on March 30, 1935 that was part of the studio's Broadway Brevities series for the season 1934–1935. It was filmed in full color (three-strip Technicolor). This film featured Wini Shaw as a singer with a group of gypsies who take over a garden party with singing, dancing and general merriment.
