= Wini Shaw =

American actress and singer (1907–1982)

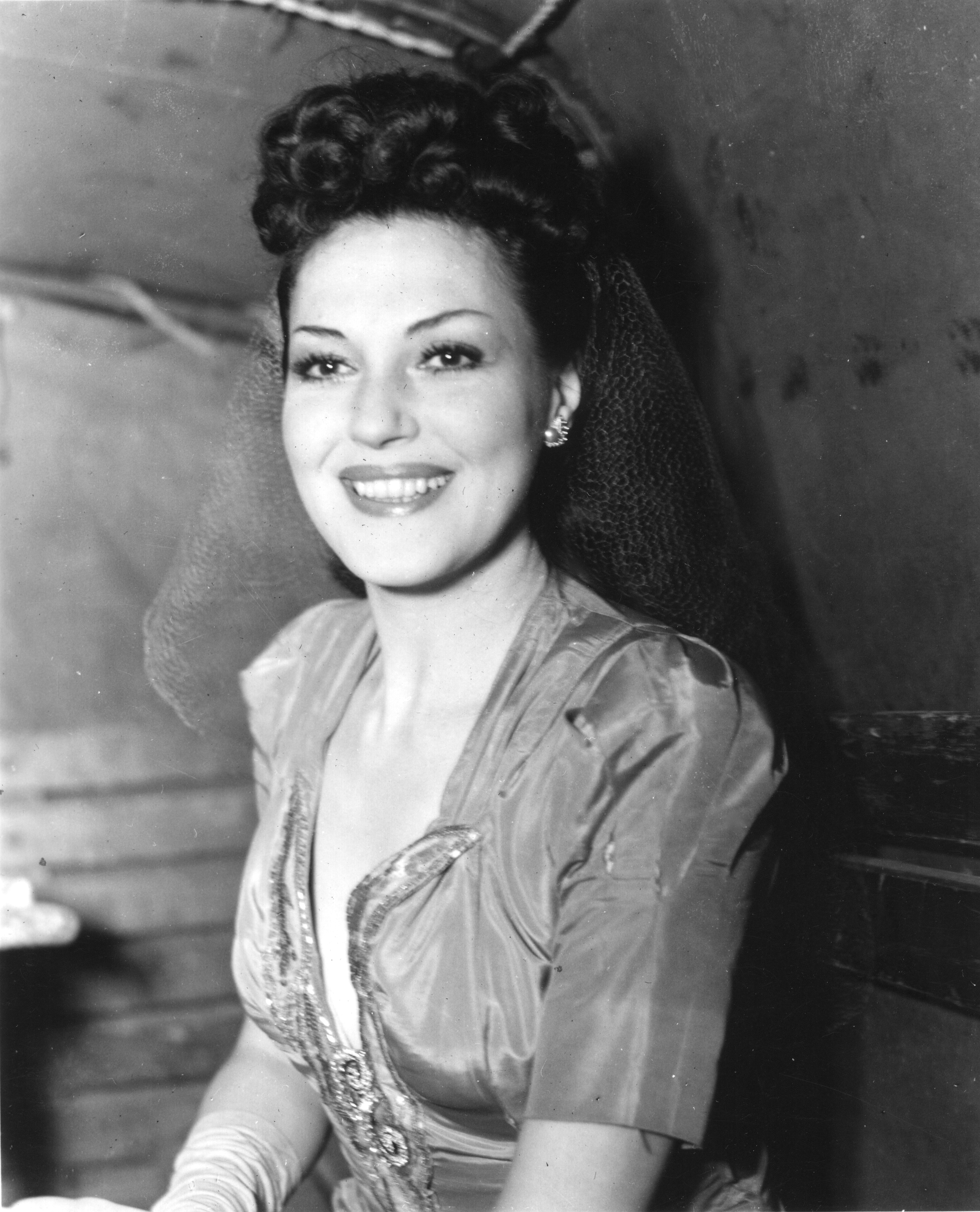
- Shaw on USO tour in 1943
- Born: Winifred Lei Momi; February 25, 1907; San Francisco, California, U.S.
- Died: May 2, 1982 (aged 75); New York City, U.S.
- Other names: Winifred Shaw; Wini O'Malley; Winifred O'Malley
- Occupations: Actress; dancer; singer
- Years active: 1934–1939
- Spouse(s): Leo Cummins (divorced) William O Malley (m. 1955)
- Children: 3

Wini Shaw (c. 1907 – May 2, 1982), sometimes credited as Winifred Shaw, was a 20th century American actress, dancer and singer.

== Early life ==
She was born as Winifred Lei Momi in about 1907 in San Francisco, the youngest of 13 children of Hawaiian descent.

Some sources suggest she was born in 1910, while the Social Security Death Index under her married name Wini O'Malley suggests she was born in 1907.

== Career ==
Shaw began her entertainment career as a child in her parents' vaudeville act and later appeared in a number of Warner Brothers musical films in the 1930s. She is best remembered for introducing the song "Lullaby of Broadway" in the musical film Gold Diggers of 1935 (1935).

Shaw's only recording, with Dick Jurgens and His Orchestra, was "Lullaby of Broadway" and "I'm Goin' Shoppin' with You". Both songs were from the film, and the recording was made on February 28, 1935.

She also sang "The Lady in Red" in the musical film In Caliente (1935) starring Dolores del Río; the song was made famous when cartoon character Bugs Bunny (voiced by Mel Blanc) parodied it in drag.

In 1937 she filmed a complicated duet live on the sound stage with a reciting and speaking Ross Alexander as she sang "Too Marvelous for Words" for the finale of Ready, Willing, and Able.

Shaw appeared in a brief revival of the production of Simple Simon (1931) on Broadway in New York City.

During World War II, she toured service camps and Red Cross clubs for the USO, sometimes as part of the Jack Benny or Larry Adler troupes.

=== Filmography ===
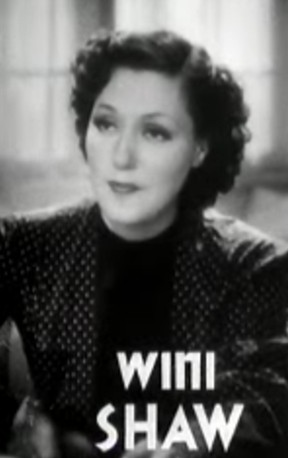
Screenshot from the trailer for the film Smart Blonde (1937)

- Cross Country Cruise (1934), uncredited
- Gift of Gab (1934)
- What, No Men! (1934) short film
- I Believed in You (1934), uncredited
- Million Dollar Ransom (1934)
- Sweet Adeline (1934)
- Three on a Honeymoon (1934)
- Wake Up and Dream (1934)
- Wild Gold (1934)
- Broadway Hostess (1935)
- The Case of the Curious Bride (1935)
- Front Page Woman (1935)
- Gold Diggers of 1935 (1935)
- Gypsy Sweetheart (1935)
- In Caliente (1935)
- Page Miss Glory (1935), uncredited
- The Case of the Velvet Claws (1936)
- Fugitive in the Sky (1936)
- King of the Islands (1936)
- Romance in the Air (1936)
- Satan Met a Lady (1936)
- The Singing Kid (1936)
- Sons o' Guns (1936)
- Melody for Two (1937)
- Ready, Willing, and Able (1937)
- September in the Rain (1937), voice
- Smart Blonde (1937)
- Little Me (1938)
- Rhumba Land (1939)
