= Frank McGlynn Sr. =

American actor

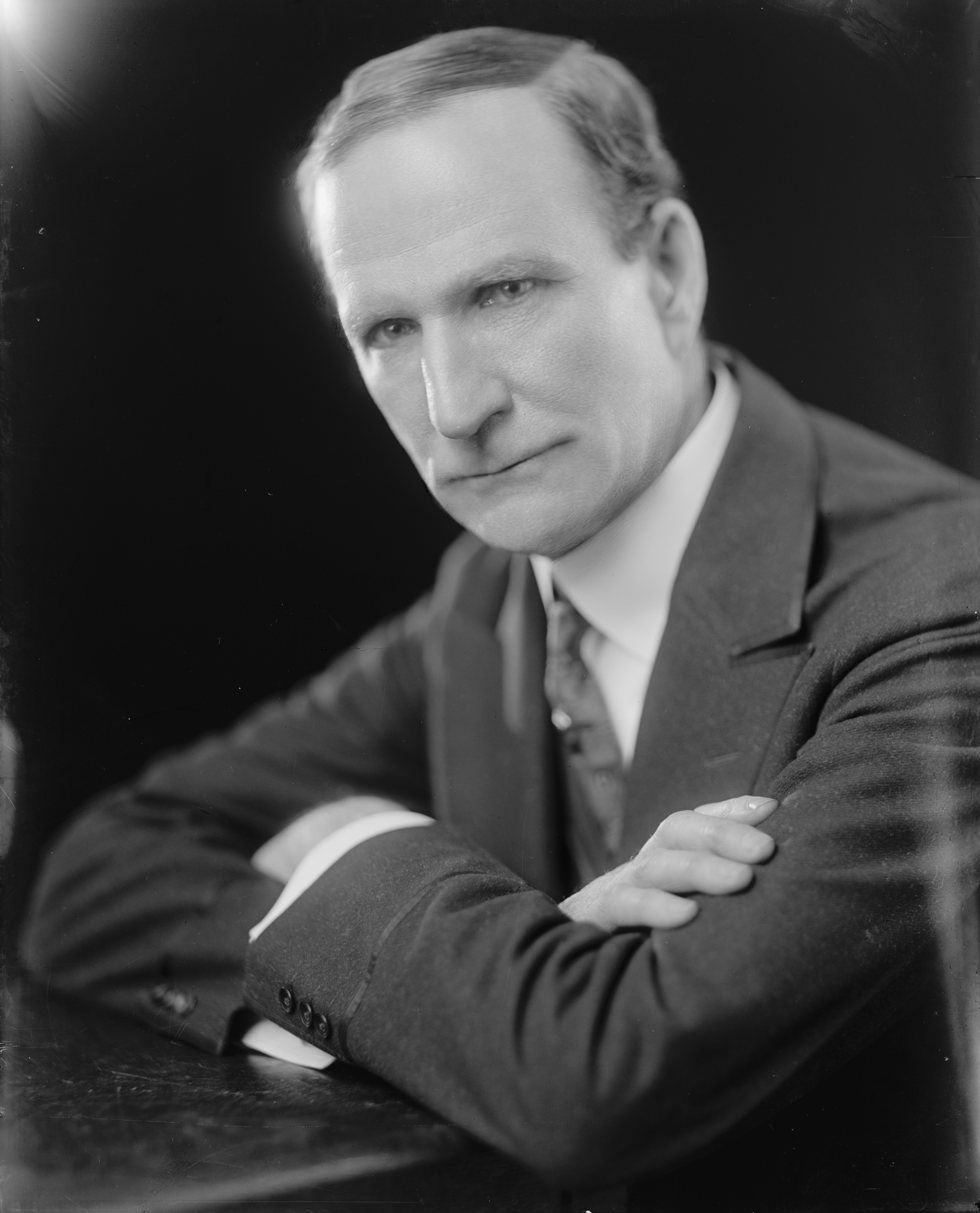
- Born: October 26, 1866; San Francisco, California, U.S.
- Died: May 18, 1951 (aged 84); Newburgh, New York, U.S.
- Occupation: Actor
- Years active: 1911–1947 (film)
- Spouse: Rose (née Sheridan) McGlynn

Frank McGlynn Sr. (October 26, 1866 – May 18, 1951) was an American stage and screen actor who, in a career that spanned more than half a century, is best known for his convincing impersonations and performances as Abraham Lincoln in both plays and films.

== Early life ==
McGlynn was born in 1866 in San Francisco, the eldest of four children of Mary and Frank McGlynn. Federal census records indicate that McGlynn, in addition to having two younger sisters, had a younger brother, George, who died sometime between 1870 and 1880. Those records show too that McGlynn's mother, a native of Australia, immigrated to the United States with her Irish parents around the time of the California Gold Rush. His father, also of Irish ancestry, moved to California and supported the family there as a carpenter and later by working in real estate.

Originally McGlynn studied to be a lawyer. He received his law degree from the University of California, Hastings College of the Law, and was admitted to the bar in 1894.

== Career ==
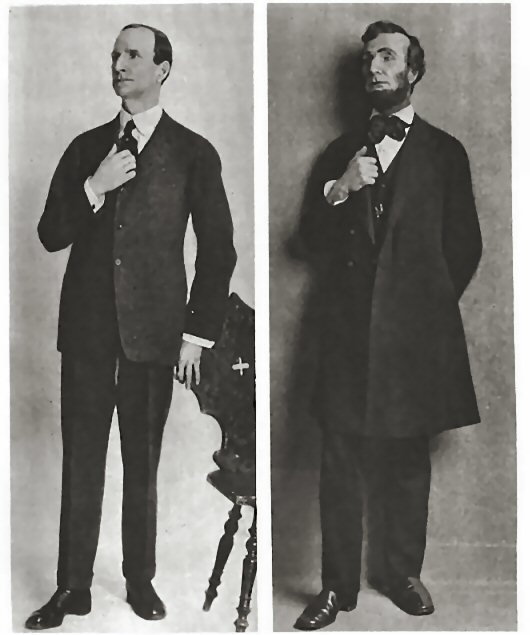
McGlynn as Lincoln in John Drinkwater's play, c. 1920

By 1896, however, McGlynn had turned to a career entirely different from law. That year he began appearing on stage in New York at the Casino Theatre, performing in The Gold Bug, a burlesque musical comedy written by Glen MacDonough with music from Victor Herbert. Later that year McGlynn toured in a road production of Under the Red Robe, a story based on Stanley Weyman's novel that was adapted for the stage by Edward Everett Rose. Over the next two decades McGlynn performed mostly in supporting roles with stock companies and in early silent films.

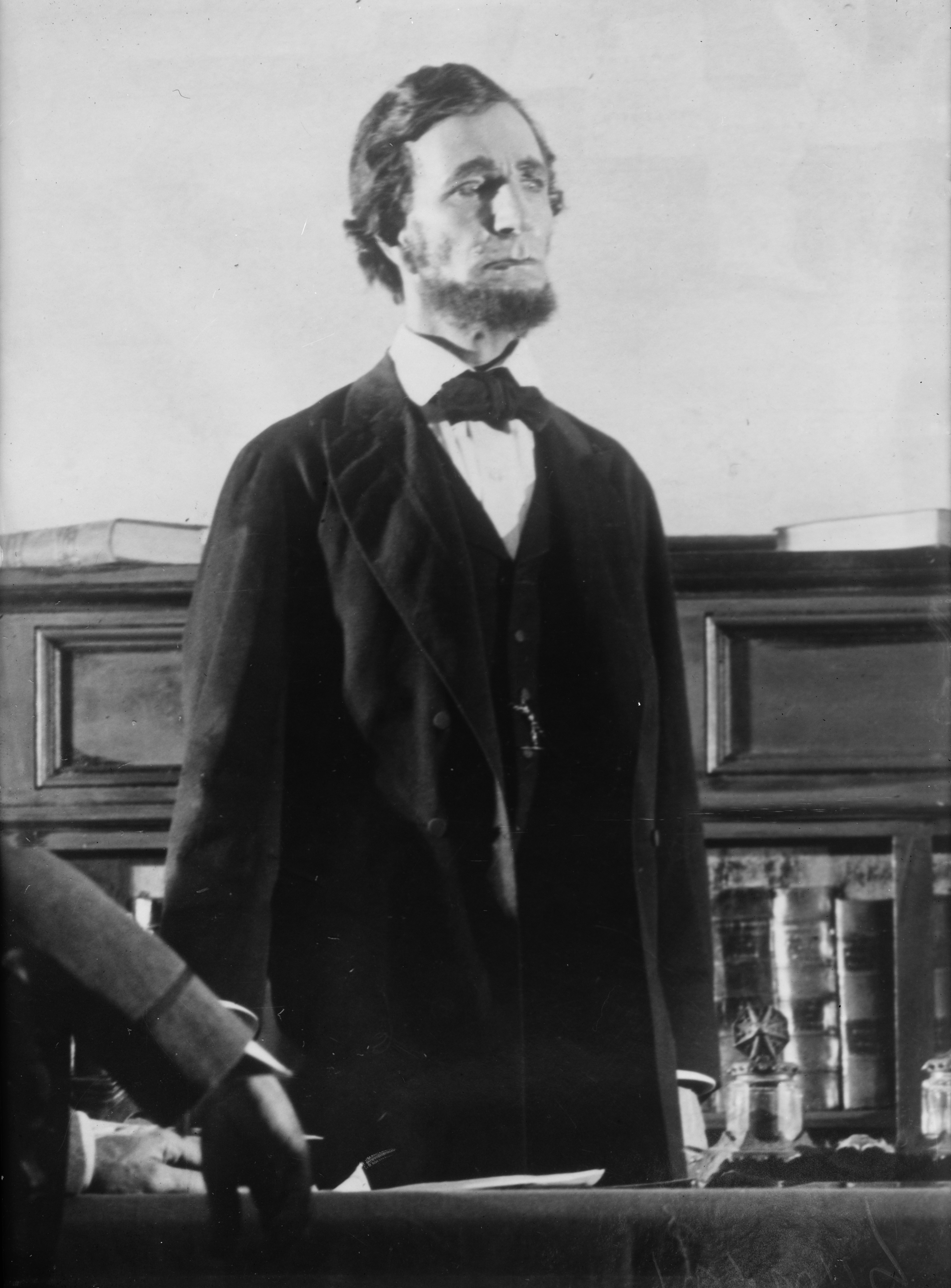
Film still of McGlynn as Lincoln in De Forest's 1924 short

McGlynn's first film role in which he impersonated Abraham Lincoln was in 1915 in The Life of Abraham Lincoln directed by Langdon West for the Edison Studios in New York. Four years later the actor's big break came when, at age fifty-three, the six-foot four-inch actor earned the starring role to portray the former president again in the Broadway production of John Drinkwater's play Abraham Lincoln. That stage production had a run of 193 performances at the Cort Theatre in Manhattan and then toured the country for over two years. In 1924, McGlynn also performed in an excerpt from Drinkwater's play that was actually recorded. Lee de Forest and J. Searle Dawley produced a two-reel short of Abraham Lincoln using De Forest's Phonofilm sound-on-film process. Unfortunately, with the exceptions of some film stills that survive, no full copy or partial reels of that motion picture have been found.

McGlynn went on to play in seven more Broadway plays; his last as Johnnie, in Frankie and Johnnie at the Theatre Republic in 1930. McGlynn's 1919 performance as Lincoln had rejuvenated his film career, which lasted into the late 1940s. In at least ten films he portrayed "The Great Emancipator"; and in one other film, Are We Civilized?, he was cast as an actor named Felix Bockner who in the plot performs as Lincoln.

== Death ==
McGlynn died at the age of eighty-four on May 18, 1951, at his daughter's residence in Newburgh, New York. He was survived by four daughters—Grace, Helen, Virginia, and Mary Rose—and by a son, Reverend Thomas McGlynn. His wife, Rose (née Sheridan), and son, Frank Jr. (also an actor), preceded him in death. He is interred in Glendale's Forest Lawn Memorial Park Cemetery.

== Selected filmography ==
- Who Will Marry Mary? (1913)
- The Pines of Lorey (1914) - John Boyd
- Through Troubled Waters (1915) - Bill Ford
- The Way Back (1915) - Samuel Kingman
- Vanity Fair (1915) - Captain William Dobbin
- Gloria's Romance (1916, Serial) - Gideon Trask
- The Argyle Case (1917) - John Argyle
- The Poor Little Rich Girl (1917) - The Plumber
- The Mad Lover (1917) - Lawyer Robertson
- Rough and Ready (1918) - The Siwash
- The Accidental Honeymoon (1918) - Farmer Perkins
- Why America Will Win (1918) - John F. Pershing
- The Caillaux Case (1918) - Emperor William of Germany
- The A.B.C. of Love (1919) - Innkeeper (uncredited)
- Abraham Lincoln (1924, Short) - Abraham Lincoln
- Good News (1930) - Prof. Kenyon
- The Jazz Cinderella (1930) - Henry Murray
- Min and Bill (1930) - Mr. Southard
- The Great Meadow (1931) - Minor Role (uncredited)
- The Secret 6 (1931) - Judge
- Huckleberry Finn (1931) - Second teacher (uncredited)
- Polly of the Circus (1932) - Head of Parish Board (uncredited)
- The Wet Parade (1932) - Food Control Speaker (uncredited)
- Lady and Gent (1932) - Principal
- Frisco Jenny (1932) - Good Book Charlie (uncredited)
- Employees' Entrance (1933) - The Editor (scenes deleted)
- Hello, Everybody! (1933) - Jonathan Reed
- Unknown Valley (1933) - Head Elder
- Charlie Chan's Greatest Case (1933) - Amos Winterslip
- Massacre (1934) - Missionary
- Search for Beauty (1934) - Rev. Rankin
- Little Miss Marker (1934) - Doc Chesley
- Are We Civilized? (1934) - Felix Bockner and Lincoln
- Wild Gold (1934) - Thompson the Storekeeper (uncredited)
- Belle of the Nineties (1934) - Justice of the Peace (uncredited)
- Lost in the Stratosphere (1934) - Col. Worthington
- The Mighty Barnum (1934) - Barnum's Butler (uncredited)
- Folies Bergère de Paris (1935) - Joseph
- It's a Small World (1935) - Snake Brown Jr.
- Goin' to Town (1935) - Judge (uncredited)
- The Roaring West (1935, Serial) - Jinglebob Morgan
- Outlawed Guns (1935) - Jingles
- Captain Blood (1935) - Rev. Ogle
- The Littlest Rebel (1935) - Abraham Lincoln
- It's Up to You (1936)
- The Prisoner of Shark Island (1936) - President Abraham Lincoln
- The Trail of the Lonesome Pine (1936) - Preacher (uncredited)
- These Three (1936) - Judge (uncredited)
- For the Service (1936) - Jim LaMont
- Hearts in Bondage (1936) - Abraham Lincoln
- Parole! (1936) - A.R. Patton (uncredited)
- The Last of the Mohicans (1936) - David Gamut
- King of the Royal Mounted (1936, Serial) - Henry Dundas
- North of Nome (1936) - U. S. Marshal
- The Plainsman (1936) - Abraham Lincoln (prologue)
- Career Woman (1936) - Sheriff Duncan
- The Great Barrier (1937) - Sir John Macdonald - Prime Minister of Canada
- That I May Live (1937) - Dr. Curtis (uncredited)
- Parnell (1937) - Pat Hogan (uncredited)
- Sing and Be Happy (1937) - Sheriff
- Saratoga (1937) - Ed Kenyon (uncredited)
- Broadway Melody of 1938 (1937) - Boardinghouse Resident (uncredited)
- Western Gold (1937) - Abraham Lincoln
- Sudden Bill Dorn (1937) - Cap Jinks
- Wells Fargo (1937) - Abraham Lincoln
- The Bad Man of Brimstone (1937) - Minister at Wedding (uncredited)
- The Adventures of Tom Sawyer (1938) - Minister (uncredited)
- The Lone Ranger (1938, Serial) - Lincoln [Ch. 1] (deleted scene)
- The Girl of the Golden West (1938) - Pete - Gambler (uncredited)
- Lincoln in the White House (1939, Short) - Lincoln
- Love Affair (1939) - Orphanage Superintendent (uncredited)
- Second Fiddle (1939) - Lincolnesque Actor (uncredited)
- The Honeymoon's Over (1939) - Thin Man
- The Mad Empress (1939) - President Abraham Lincoln
- Boom Town (1940) - Deacon
- Third Finger, Left Hand (1940) - Judge Holman (uncredited)
- A Girl, a Guy and a Gob (1941) - Panky
- Sergeant York (1941) - Mountaineer (uncredited)
- Three Girls About Town (1941) - Josephus Wiegal
- Marry the Boss's Daughter (1941) - Hoffman
- Syncopation (1942) - Simon Goodwill (uncredited)
- In Old California (1942) - Old Miner (uncredited)
- Delinquent Daughters (1944) - Judge Craig
- Rogues' Gallery (1944) - Blake
- I Was a Criminal (1945) - Prison Warden
- Slightly Scandalous (1946) - Graves (uncredited)
- Trail Street (1947) - Tim McKeon (uncredited)
- Hollywood Barn Dance (1947) - Pa (Hiram) Tubb
