= What, No Men! =

1934 film

What, No Men?
- Directed by: Ralph Staub
- Written by: Joe Traub; Paul Gerard Smith
- Starring: El Brendel; Wini Shaw; Phil Regan
- Cinematography: Ray Rennahan
- Edited by: Jack Killifer
- Music by: Sammy Fain; Irving Kahal
- Distributed by: Warner Bros. Vitaphone
- Release date: January 5, 1934
- Running time: 21 minutes
- Country: United States
- Language: English

What, No Men? is a 1934 American short comedy film directed by Ralph Staub and starring El Brendel, Wini Shaw, and Phil Regan. It was filmed in Technicolor. In 1934, it was nominated for an Academy Award for Best Short Subject (Comedy) at the 7th Academy Awards.

== Cast ==
- El Brendel as Gus Olson, gas utility representative
- Phil Regan as Policeman
- Wini Shaw as Saloon Owner
