= Leslie Hutchinson =

Grenada-born singer and musician (1900–1969)

- Hutch in the 1930s

Background information
- Also known as: "Hutch"
- Born: Leslie Arthur Julien Hutchinson; 7 March 1900; Gouyave, Grenada, British Windward Islands
- Died: 18 August 1969 (aged 69) Hampstead, London, England
- Genres: Cabaret
- Occupation: Singer
- Instrument: Piano
- Spouse: Ella Byrd (died 1958)

Leslie Arthur Julien Hutchinson (7 March 1900 – 18 August 1969), known as "Hutch", was a Grenada-born singer and musician who was one of the biggest cabaret stars in the world during the 1920s and 1930s.

== Early life ==
Born in Gouyave, Grenada, in 1900, when it was part of the British Windward Islands, to George Hutchinson and Marianne (née Turnbull), Hutch took piano lessons as a child.

In 1916, he moved to New York while still in his teens. He originally emigrated to study for a degree in medicine as he had won a place due to his high aptitude, but instead he began playing the piano and singing in bars.

== Career ==
In New York City, Hutch joined a black band led by Henry "Broadway" Jones, who often played for white millionaires such as the Vanderbilt. In 1924, Hutch left America for Paris, where he had a residency in Joe Zelli's club and became a friend and lover of Cole Porter.

Encouraged by Edwina Mountbatten, he moved to England and opened at the Café de Paris in London on 19 January 1927 as part of a double act with his friend, the black tenor Opal Cooper. The two men made a record together ("Moonlight on the Ganges" and "Because I Love You") and they also appeared in variety at the Holborn Empire. Hutchinson went on to be the second pianist in the pit in the Rodgers and Hart musical, One Dam' Thing After Another, which opened at the London Pavilion on 20 May 1927. He had moved from the Café de Paris to another London club, Chez Victor, in February 1927 (this time without Cooper) and after an extended spell there, he transferred to the Devonshire Restaurant in November 1927. Hutchinson soon became the darling of society and the population in general. Hutch was a favourite singer of the then Prince of Wales (later King Edward VIII). Hutch was a major star in Britain during the 1920s and 1930s, and was, for a time, the highest paid star in the country. He was regularly heard on air with the BBC, with one of his biggest hits, his version of "These Foolish Things". Hutchinson soon became embittered by being frequently obliged to enter parties via the servant's entrance, in spite of his popularity.

Hutch recorded several of Cole Porter's songs, including "Begin the Beguine" and Porter's list song "Let's Do It, Let's Fall in Love", to which he supposedly made up some 70 new verses.

Hutch was "one of the first stars in Britain" to volunteer to entertain the troops at home and abroad during World War II, but he received no formal recognition for his service, and his name would never appear in any Honours list.

== Discography ==
Hutch was a busy recording artist in the 1930s and 40s. His final recording, made just before his death, was for Morgan Records and was the LP "The Magic That Was Hutch".

== Personal life ==
He married Ella Byrd, a woman of African, English, and Chinese ancestry, in 1923 or 1924 in New York City. Their daughter, Lesley Bagley Yvonne, was born on 9 April 1926. He fathered seven further children with six different mothers. Gordon was born in August 1928, Gabrielle in September 1930, Jennifer in October 1939, Gerald and Chris in 1948, and Graham (Chris's full brother) in 1953, and Emma in April 1965.

In 1930, one of Hutch's mistresses, British debutante Elizabeth Sperling, was discovered to be pregnant. Her family tried to hush up the affair, hastily marrying Sperling off to an army officer Col Arthur Corbett, and attempting to pass off the child as his. When the child was born, however, and discovered to be of mixed race, Corbett refused to acknowledge her as his own. She (Gabrielle) was put up for adoption and Sperling's outraged father, the former diplomat Rowland Sperling sued Hutch.

Hutch is rumoured to have had a lengthy affair with Edwina Mountbatten, Countess Mountbatten of Burma. The rumour scandalised the British upper classes, becoming the subject of tabloid news, and an embarrassment to Mountbatten's royal in-laws. The Mountbattens sued the tabloids for libel. As a result of the scandal, Hutch was shunned by many of his former patrons, and his career was effectively over.

Other reported mistresses were the Hollywood actresses Tallulah Bankhead and Merle Oberon.

Hutch may have been bisexual and was alleged to have had relationships with Cole Porter and Ivor Novello.

== Death ==
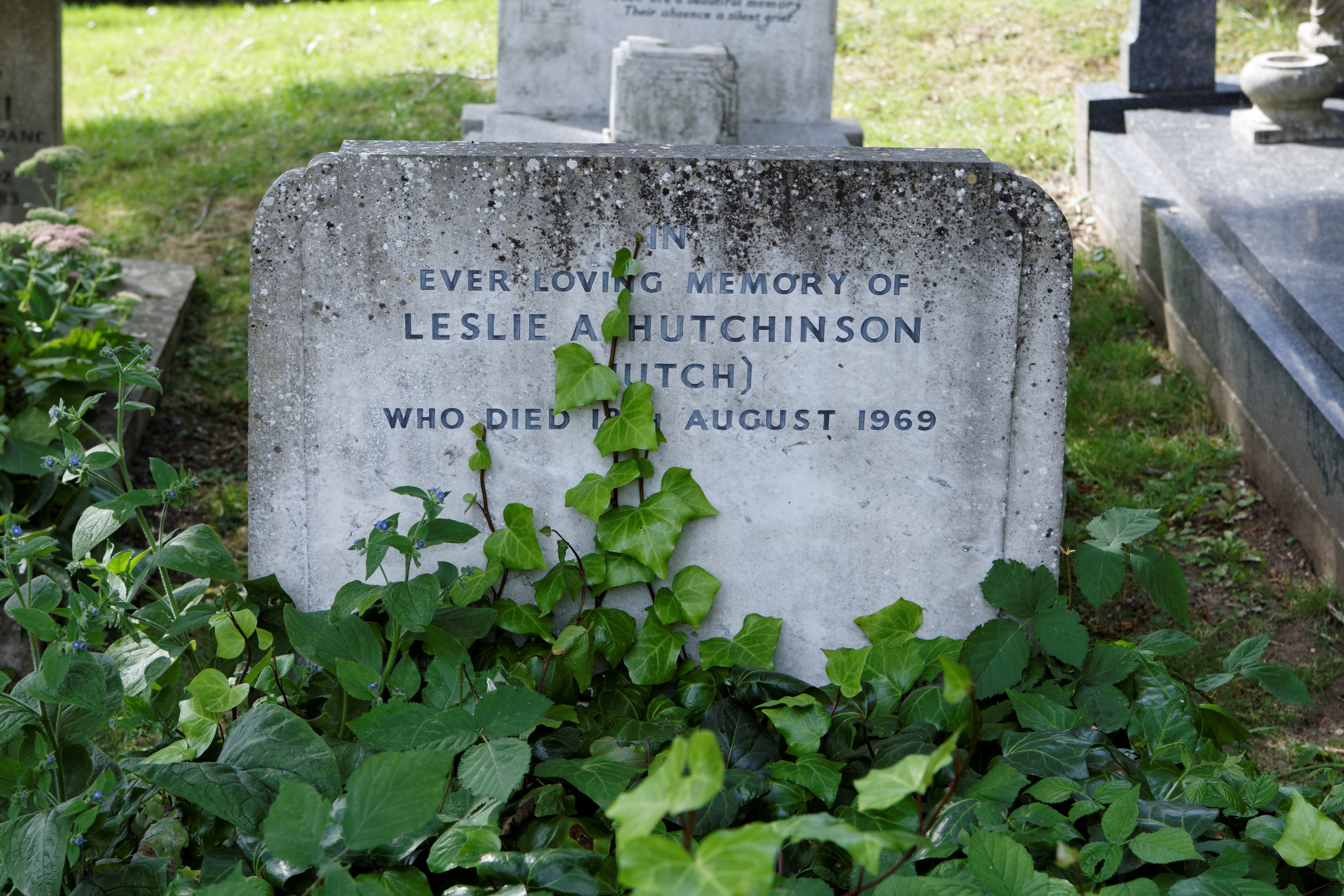
Hutchinson's grave in Highgate Cemetery

Leslie Hutchinson suffered from ill-health in his later years and died at New End Hospital, Hampstead in London from pneumonia on 18 August 1969. Forty-two people attended his funeral on 22 August 1969 at the Parish Church of St. John, Hampstead.

== Legacy ==
On 12 October 2012, an English Heritage blue plaque in commemoration of Hutch was unveiled by his daughter Gabrielle Markes at 31 Steele's Road, Belsize Park, his home from 1929 to 1967.

The "scandalous" character Jack Ross on the British series Downton Abbey, played by Gary Carr, may be based on Hutchinson.

In November 2016, Hutch was featured in episode four of the BBC series Black and British: A Forgotten History, titled The Homecoming, presented by historian David Olusoga. On the occasion of the programme, a plaque was unveiled by two of his children, Gabrielle and her half-brother Chris, in the presence of extended family at Mayfair restaurant Quaglino's, where he used to perform later in his career.

== Filmography ==
- Actor
  - Big Business (1930) – pianist
  - Beloved Imposter (1936) – pianist
  - Happidrome (1943)
  - Brass Monkey aka Lucky Mascot (1948) – Hutch (as Leslie A. Hutchinson)
  - The Treasure of San Teresa (1959) – Hutch, piano player at Billie's
- Soundtrack
  - Big Business (1930) – performs "Always Your Humble Slave"
  - Brass Monkey (1948) – performs "To-Morrow's Rainbow"
- As self
  - Cock o' the North (1935)
  - Starlight (TV series, 1936)

== Cultural references ==
- Kenneth Williams regularly performed impersonations of Hutchinson,
- Flanders and Swann referenced him in the closing verse of "Song of Reproduction" (from At the Drop of a Hat): "With a tone control at a single touch / I can make a Caruso sound like Hutch".
- On 25 November 2008, Channel 4 TV in the UK showed a documentary on his life called High Society's Favourite Gigolo.
- The musical play Hutch opened at the Riverside Studios on 14 May 2013; written by Joe Evans, adapted from the biography by Charlotte Breese, and featuring the music of Cole Porter.
- The character Jack Ross in the ITV drama Downton Abbey, written by Julian Fellowes, is based on Leslie Hutchinson.
- A National Scandal, a play by Eddie Lewisohn about Hutch and Lady Edwina Mountbatten, with Paul Hazel as Hutch and Bethany Blake as Edwina, opened Upstairs at The Gatehouse in Highgate, London, in October 2018.
