= Sylvester Lewis =

American jazz musician

Sylvester Lewis (October 19, 1908 in Kansas City, Missouri – 1974 in New York City) was an American jazz trumpeter.

Lewis played locally as a college student in Kansas City in the 1920s. His first major tour was with a traveling revue called Shake Your Feet, where he met Herbie Cowens; he then joined Cowens's own group, playing at the Rockland Palace in New York City in 1928. He also recorded with Jelly Roll Morton in New York. After a stint with Aubrey Neal (1929–30), Lewis joined Claude Hopkins's band, playing with him from 1930 to 1936 and recording with him extensively between 1932 and 1935.

After leaving Hopkins, Lewis performed in Billy Butler's orchestra for the theater show Rhapsody in Black and played in Noble Sissle and Eubie Blake's Shuffle Along in 1941. He led his own band for troop tours of the Pacific during World War II, and recorded with Roy Eldridge in 1946 after his discharge. He began studying the Schillinger system in the late 1940s, but gave up music entirely after 1949 and spent the rest of his life working for the New York City Subway.
