= Herbert Cowans =

American jazz musician

Herbert "Kat" Cowans or Cowens (May 24, 1904 – January 23, 1993) was an American jazz drummer born in Texas.

Cowans worked as a shoeshine boy as a child. His first professional engagement as a drummer was with the Satisfied Five, a local Texas ensemble. After moving to Wichita Falls, he played in Frenchy's New Orleans Jazz Band, then worked with Charlie Dixon. He quit Dixon's ensemble to finish high school while still in his teens. He played in theater orchestras early in the 1920s, then moved to New York City to play with Cleo Mitchell in the Shake Your Feet revue. Following this, he did work with the Kansas City Blackbirds, Jimmy Cooper's Black and White Revue, and Eubie Blake in addition to leading his own band (which included Sylvester Lewis among its members).

In the 1930s Cowans played with Fats Waller and Stuff Smith, and joined Eddie Heywood's band for recordings behind Billie Holiday in 1941. He worked with Garvin Bushell in 1942, then played in the pit orchestra for the Broadway show The Pirate. Cowans led a USO band in 1943, touring military bases worldwide, then led small ensembles for several decades thereafter. He also worked with Louis Metcalfe in 1963. He worked with USO again in East Asia in the 1970s, then retired to Dallas.
