= James Gant =

British actor

- Born: James Alexander Gant; Saffron Walden, Essex, England
- Occupations: Actor singer
- Years active: 2009–present

James Alexander Gant (born 7 April 1988) is an English actor and singer best known for performing in Musical Theatre in the West End, London.

== Personal life ==
Gant attended Saffron Walden County High School in Saffron Walden, was a company member of Youth Music Theatre UK and ultimately completed his professional acting training at Mountview Academy of Theatre Arts in 2010. His first professional role was in the musical Evita on the UK and International Tour in 2009/10. In 2018 he married West End actress Sophie Feek, with whom he has three children.

== Work in Theatre ==
Gant has performed on stage in the United Kingdom for nearly 10 years. Notable productions in which he has appeared include Les Misérables, Oliver!, Titanic (musical), Jekyll and Hyde (musical), and Grand Hotel. Most recently, he played Death opposite Zoe Doano in Death Takes a Holiday at the Charing Cross Theatre in London and then he starred in Julian Fellowes new musical The Wind in the Willows at the London Palladium, UK. Gant appeared in Twelfth Night and A Christmas Carol in Stratford-upon-Avon from Nov 2017 and Feb 2018.

=== Theatre credits ===
Year	Role	Production	Theatre	Director
2020–present	Auctioneer u/s The Phantom of the Opera	The Phantom of the Opera	Her Majesty's Theatre and UK Tour	Harold Prince
2020	Mr Smythe	A Christmas Carol	Dominion Theatre	Shaun Kerrison
2018 - 2019	Etches	Titanic	UK and International Tour	Thom Southerland
2018–2019	Leroy	Violet	West End, London	Shuntaro Fujita
2018	Manservant/Police Inspector	Twelfth Night	Royal Shakespeare Company	Chris Luscombe
2017	George/Father	A Christmas Carol	Royal Shakespeare Company	Rachel Kavanaugh
2017	Death	Death Takes a Holiday	West End, London	Thom Southerland
2016/2017	Mr Hedgehog	The Wind in the Willows	UK Tour and London Palladium	Rachel Kavanaugh
2016	Etches	Titanic	Charing Cross Theatre	Thom Southerland
2016	Geographer	The Little Prince	Emirates Palace	Simon Lee
2016	Mr Bumble	Oliver!	Curve Theatre, Leicester	Paul Kerryson
2013/15	Courfeyrac u/s Jean Valjean & Javert	Les Miserables	Queen's Theatre	Trevor Nunn
2012	Landlord	Oliver!	UK tour	Lawrence Connor
2011	Poole	Jekyll & Hyde	UK tour	Martin Connors
2010	Ensemble	Evita	UK and International Tour	Bob Thomson
