= Henry A. Jones =

Henry A. Jones may refer to:

- Henry A. Jones (1888–1948), the birth name of American singer and musical theatre actor Broadway Jones
- Henry Arthur Jones (1851–1929), English dramatist
