= The Eighty-Six Years of Eubie Blake =

The 86 Years of Eubie Blake

Studio album by Eubie Blake
- Released: 1969
- Recorded: December 26, 1968 – March 12, 1969
- Genre: Ragtime
- Label: Columbia

Eubie Blake chronology
Golden Reunion in Ragtime (1962)	The 86 Years of Eubie Blake (1969)	Ragtime Concert (1973)

Professional ratings
Review scores
Source	Rating
AllMusic	4.5/5 stars

The 86 Years of Eubie Blake is a 1969 studio album by ragtime pianist Eubie Blake and marks a reunion for Blake with his longtime collaborator, Noble Sissle. The album was recorded in three sessions, the first on December 26, 1968, followed by two more on February 6, and March 12, 1969.

In 2006 the Library of Congress selected The Eighty-Six Years of Eubie Blake for inclusion in the National Recording Registry based on its cultural, artistic or historical significance.

== Track listing ==
Track	Song title	Composer
1.	"Dream Rag"	Jesse Pickett
2.	"Semper Fidelis"	John Philip Sousa
3.	"Tricky Fingers"	Eubie Blake
4.	"Troublesome Ivories"	Blake
5.	"Chevy Chase"	Blake
6.	"Brittwood Rag"	Blake
7.	"Spanish Venus"	Luckey Roberts
8.	"As Long As You Live"	Bernie Hanighen, Johnny Mercer
9.	"Memories of You"	Blake, Andy Razaf
10.	"Charleston Rag"	Blake
11.	"Maple Leaf Rag"	Scott Joplin
12.	"Stars and Stripes Forever"	Sousa
13.	"Shuffle Along Medley" (feat. Noble Sissle)	Blake
14.	"I'm Just Wild About Harry"	Blake, Noble Sissle
15.	"Blue Rag in 12 Keys"	Blake
16.	"Eubie's Boogie"	Blake, Sissle
17.	"Poor Jimmy Green"	
18.	"Baltimore Todolo"	Blake, Sissle
19.	"Poor Katie Red"	Blake
20.	"Kitchen Tom"	Blake
21.	"Medley: Bleeding Moon / Under the Bamboo Tree"	
22.	"It's All Your Fault" (feat. Noble Sissle)	Blake, Sissle, Nelson
23.	"Medley: Charleston / Old-Fashioned Love / If I Could Be With You"	Zoltan Fabian, James P. Johnson
24.	"You Were Meant For Me" (feat. Noble Sissle)	Nacio Herb Brown, Arthur Freed
25.	"Dixie Moon"	Blake, Sissle
26.	"Blues, Why Don't You Let Me Alone?"	Blake/Arthur Porter

== Personnel ==
- Eubie Blake, piano
- Noble Sissle, vocals
