= The Wind in the Willows (2016 musical) =

- Original musical poster
- Music: George Stiles
- Lyrics: Anthony Drewe
- Book: Julian Fellowes
- Basis: The Wind in the Willows by Kenneth Grahame
- Premiere: 8 October 2016: Theatre Royal, Plymouth
- Productions: 2016 UK Tour; 2017 West End; 2018 Royal Tunbridge Wells

The Wind in the Willows is a musical written by Julian Fellowes, with music and lyrics by George Stiles and Anthony Drewe, based on the 1908 novel of the same name, written by Kenneth Grahame. The musical received its world premiere at the Theatre Royal in Plymouth in October 2016, before transferring to The Lowry in Salford and the Mayflower Theatre in Southampton. The following year the production transferred to the West End's London Palladium, where it was filmed for cinema broadcast.

== Background ==
In December 2011, it was revealed that a musical adaption of the 1908 novel The Wind in the Willows was being worked on by Julian Fellowes with music and lyrics to be penned by George Stiles and Anthony Drewe. The trio first worked together on the musical Mary Poppins. In November 2013, a Crowdfunding exercise was launched to raise ten percent of the show's £6.5m budget, with a view to opening the show in London in 2015. Ultimately more than 10% was raised by that means, totalling one million pounds.

The musical has a book by Downton Abbey creator Fellowes, based on the 1908 novel The Wind in the Willows by Kenneth Grahame and is directed by Rachel Kavanaugh, with design by Peter McKintosh, lighting design by Howard Harrison and sound design by Gareth Owen. The show features an original score by George Stiles and lyrics by Anthony Drewe. Open auditions were held in April 2016.

== Production history ==
=== UK tour (2016) ===
The musical made its world premiere at the Theatre Royal Plymouth from 8 to 22 October 2016, before heading to the Lowry Theatre Salford from 27 October to 6 November 2016 and the Mayflower Theatre Southampton from 10 to 20 November 2016. The cast included Rufus Hound as Toad, David Birrell as Badger, Fra Fee as Mole, Thomas Howes as Rat, Neil McDermott as Chief Weasel and Sophia Nomvete as Mrs Otter.

=== West End (2017) ===
On 8 November 2016, it was announced that the musical would transfer into the West End at the London Palladium, with previews beginning 17 June, with the opening night scheduled for 29 June 2017. Whilst always a limited run, the planned closing night of 9 September 2017 was brought a week earlier to 2 September 2017 due to disappointing ticket sales. Hound and McDermott reprised their roles as Toad and Chief Weasel, and were joined by Simon Lipkin as Rat, Craig Mather as Mole, Denise Welch as Mrs Otter and Gary Wilmot as Badger.

During the West End run the musical was filmed by BroadwayHD, with direction by Tim van Someren. In 2018, it was released in UK cinemas over the Easter period, and was added to BroadwayHD online in August 2018. This filmed production was also made available on the musical's official website to rent, in March 2020.

=== Other productions ===
Opening 13 December 2018, professional regional theatre company Trinity Theatre successfully produced a short three-week revival run of the show which was briefly extended with extra performance dates due to its popularity. Susan Elkin reviewed the production positively, awarding it four stars and describing the show as "in pretty good hands with Trinity Theatre Productions". BroadwayWorld lists the cast as featuring "Alastair Brown, Alexandra Burns, Ashton Charge, Benjamin Stone, Brook Adams, Ian Chaplin, Jamie Scott-Smith, Lewis Mariot, Harriet Doyle, Luke Simnett, Matthew West, Sara Louisa Parry and Scarlett Leigh Fawcett". The production closed 6 January 2019.

An intimate revival was presented by the Turbine Theatre from 21 to 25 July 2021, directed by Sasha Regan with choreography by James Bennett and musical direction by Olivia Wormald. Casting included Tom Duern, Evelyn Hoskins, Josh Coley, Idriss Kargbo, Matthew Jay Ryan, Michael Burgen, Jade Marvin and Emma Ralston. The production toured to Latitude Festival where it was one of the top 10 highlights of the year.

== Plot ==
=== Act I ===
With the arrival of spring, Mole loses patience with spring cleaning ("Spring"). He leaves his underground home for the river, where he meets Rat (a water vole), who spends all his days on the river. Rat takes Mole for a ride in his rowing boat ("Messing About in a Boat"). After this, he shares his picnic and an enduring friendship is born. Mrs. Otter gate crashes the friend's picnic looking for her daughter Portia, who often wanders off in search of food. Rat and Mrs Otter warn Mole about the inhabitants of the Wild Wood and tell him of wise but solitary Badger who lives there. Mr. Toad is rich, jovial, friendly and kind-hearted, but aimless and conceited; he regularly becomes obsessed with current fads, only to abandon them abruptly. His current fad is boating, and he speeds by the picnic on a wager-boat ("Speed is of the Essence").

The swallows arrive to herald the beginning of summer ("One Swallow Does Not a Summer Make"). Mole and Rat visit Toad Hall at Mr. Toad's invitation. Having recently given up boating, Mr. Toad's current craze is his horse-drawn caravan, which he invites the reluctant Rat and willing Mole to join him on ("The Open Road"). Parked at the roadside for an overnight stop, a passing motor car scares the horse, flipping over the caravan. Although Rat and Mole are upset, Mr. Toad becomes infatuated with motor cars. In his new racer, he terrorises his neighbours, particularly a family of nervous Hedgehogs ("The Hedgehog's Nightmare"). The animals are both fascinated and dismayed about the new craze, which he enthuses about before crashing his car ("The Amazing Mr Toad").

Autumn draws near. Determined to save Mr Toad from himself, Mole insists Rat and he venture into the Wild Wood to call on the support of Badger. When Rat refuses, Mole ventures on the scary road alone. Pursued by the Chief Weasel and his Wild Wooders, Mole only escapes when Rat has a change of heart ("The Wild Wooders"). However, the two become lost as the piles of leaves obscure the path ("Autumn"). When Mole injures himself on a boot scraper, Rat realises they have accidentally stumbled on Badger's doorstep. As Badger invites them in, Chief Weasel tells his gang of Wild Wooders of his plot to steal Toad Hall so they can live the good-life. Portia, still looking for food, is kidnapped by the gang ("The Wild Wooders Reprise").

Inside Badger's house, Mole and Rat convince Badger to come to Mr. Toad's aid ("A Friend is Still a Friend"). The trio arrive at Toad Hall to find that Mr. Toad has ordered a new car after his crash and decide to guard him in his bedroom until he learns some sense. Mrs Otter arrives, begging the friends to help her find Portia. Mole guards Mr Toad whilst Rat and Badger join the search. Feigning illness, Mr. Toad escapes Toad Hall, and steals a beautiful new car ("Toad's Escape"). However, the car owner and police catch him in the act ("Stop Thief").

Arrested for his theft, a court scene takes place with the Wild Wooders as the jury, making sure that Mr Toad is imprisoned so they can take over Toad Hall. Without showing much remorse, Toad recalls what happened in his grandiose manner while Rat, Mole and Badger try and convince him to show some remorse for his crime. The scene ends with Mr. Toad being sentenced to twenty years in jail, to his dismay ("As if in a Dream").

=== Act II ===
With Toad in prison, the Wild Wooders have taken over Toad Hall and are fattening up Portia for a feast to come ("We're Taking Over the Hall"). In prison, Mr Toad gains the sympathy of the Gaoler's Daughter, who helps him to escape disguised as a washerwoman ("To Be a Woman"). Walking through the Wood, Rat and Mole discuss the imprisonment of their friend when they come across Mole's home. Having realised that Mole hasn't returned since the day he left his Spring cleaning, the friends have a humble feast, while Mole speaks fondly of his home ("A Place to Come Back To"). After this, some wassailing mice visit as is familiar to Mole, wishing well to the animals of the forest ("The Wassailing Mice"). As the song ends, Badger bursts in to inform Rat and Mole that Mr Toad has escaped prison. Knowing the Wild Wooders will torture and kill Toad if he attempts to enter Toad Hall, the trio set out to find him first.

Mr. Toad, pursued by the police, begins his escape. He boards a railway engine manned by a sympathetic driver. As the law catches up, Toad is kicked off the train, and, still disguised as a washerwoman, comes across a horse-drawn barge. The barge's owner gives Toad a lift in exchange for Mr Toad's services as a washerwoman. After botching the wash, Mr Toad gets into a fight with the barge-woman, and gets thrown overboard. Soaked, Mr Toad flags down a passing car, which happens to be the one he stole earlier. The car owner, not recognising Mr Toad in his disguise, permits him to drive the car. Once behind the wheel, he is possessed by his former passion and drives furiously. He reveals his identity to the car owner, and in the ensuing struggle, the car crashes ("The Greatest Great Escape").

Badger discovers Toad at the doors of Toad Hall. Badger and friends tell Mr Toad that Toad Hall has been taken over by weasels and stoats from the Wild Wood and even worse, that Portia is trapped inside. After Mole convinces two guards that an attack on the Hall is imminent, Badger announces that he knows of a secret tunnel into Toad Hall through which the enemies may be attacked ("Hush!"). Badger, Mrs Otter, Rat, Mole and Mr Toad enter via the tunnel and pounce upon the unsuspecting Wild Wooders who are holding a celebratory party and about to cook Portia ("The Fight"). The friends celebrate their victory over the intruders. It's spring once again, and the animals are working hard, while Rat and Mole quite happily row on the river together - they are both content in having one another's company over the adventures Toad has. Mr Toad holds a party to mark his return, but his big entrance on an airplane (or, in some productions, on a jet pack) indicates that he hasn't changed his ways at all ("Finale").

== Musical numbers ==
Act I

- "Spring" – Portia, Mole and Company
- "Messing About in a Boat" – Mole & Ratty
- "Speed is of the Essence" – Mrs Otter, Ratty & Mole
- “Messing About in a Boat (Reprise)” – Mole & Ratty
- "One Swallow Does Not a Summer Make" – Swallows
- “Toad's Big Entrance” - Toad, Company
- "The Open Road" – Toad, Ratty, Mole & Horse
- "Speed is of the Essence (Reprise)" – Toad
- "The Hedgehog's Nightmare" – Hedgehogs
- "The Amazing Mr. Toad" – Toad, Hedgehogs & Company
- "The Wild Wooders" – Chief Weasel, Sheryl Stoat, Lesser Weasel & Company
- "Autumn" – Fieldmice
- “The Wild Wooders (Reprise)” – Company
- "A Friend is Still a Friend" – Badger, Mole & Ratty
- "Toad's Escape" – Toad & Car Driver
- "As if in a Dream" – Toad, Magistrate, Chief Weasel, Mrs. Hedgehog, Mole, Ratty, Badger, Mrs Otter, Lesser Weasel & Company

Act II

- “We're Taking Over the Hall” – Chief Weasel, Sheryl Stoat, Lesser Weasel & Company
- “To Be a Woman” – Toad & Gaoler's Daughter
- “A Place to Come Back To” – Mole
- “The Wassailing Mice” – Mice & Company
- “The Greatest Great Escape” – Toad, Badger, Mole, Ratty, Engine Driver, Magistrate, Horse, Bargewoman, Car Driver, Prison Guard, Policeman & Company
- “We're Taking Over the Hall (Reprise)” – Stoat 1 & Stoat 2
- “Hush!” – Badger, Toad, Mole, Ratty, Chief Weasel & Mrs Otter
- “The Fight” – Toad, Chief Weasel, Badger, Mole, Ratty, Portia, Mrs. Otter, Stoat 1, Stoat 2 & Company
- “Finale” - Mole, Ratty, Badger, Toad, Portia, Chief Weasel, Mrs. Otter & Company

=== Original London Cast Recording ===
The Original London Cast Recording was released on 30 June 2017 by Sony Masterworks Broadway and features 20 tracks.

== Characters and original cast ==
The characters and original cast:

Character	UK tour	West End
Character	2016	2017
Toad	Rufus Hound	Rufus Hound
Mole	Fra Fee	Craig Mather
Ratty	Thomas Howes	Simon Lipkin
Badger	David Birrell	Gary Wilmot
Chief Weasel	Neil McDermott	Neil McDermott
Mrs Otter	Sophia Nomvete	Denise Welch
Lesser Weasel / Fieldmouse	Dylan Mason	Joshua Gannon
Mrs. Hedgehog / Gaolers Daughter	Jenna Boyd	Jenna Boyd
Mr. Hedgehog	James Gant	James Gant
Magistrate	Adam Vaughan	Adam Vaughan
Car Driver	Graham Lappin	James Gant
Train Driver	Adam Vaughan	Chris Aukett
Bargewoman	Emma Odell	Denise Welch
Head Chorister Fieldmouse	Michael Larcombe	Michael Larcombe
Horse	Courtney Bowman	Natalie Woods
Horse / Swallow / Fieldmouse	Abigail Brodie	Abigail Brodie
Swallow / Fieldmouse	Bethany Linsdell	Bethany Linsdell
Rabbit Butler	Evan James	Evan James
Cheryl Stoat / Swallow	Karli Vale	Rosanna Bates
Dance Captain/Prison Guard	Ryan Pidgen	Ryan Pidgen
Scared Weasel	Jorell Coiffic-Kamall	Jorell Coiffic-Kamall
Scared Stoat	Nicole Deon	Nicole Deon
Swing	Patrick Sullivan	Joel Baylis
Swing	Georgie Westall	Georgie Westall
Sentry Stoat	Rakesh Boury	
Portia	Holly Willock	Emilie du Leslay

== Awards and nominations ==
=== Original Production ===
Year	Award Ceremony	Category	Nominee	Result	Ref
2017	Manchester Theatre Awards	Best Musical		Nominated	
2017	Manchester Theatre Awards	Best Actor in a Visiting Production	Rufus Hound	Won	
