= Broadway Jones (performer) =

American performer and nightclub owner

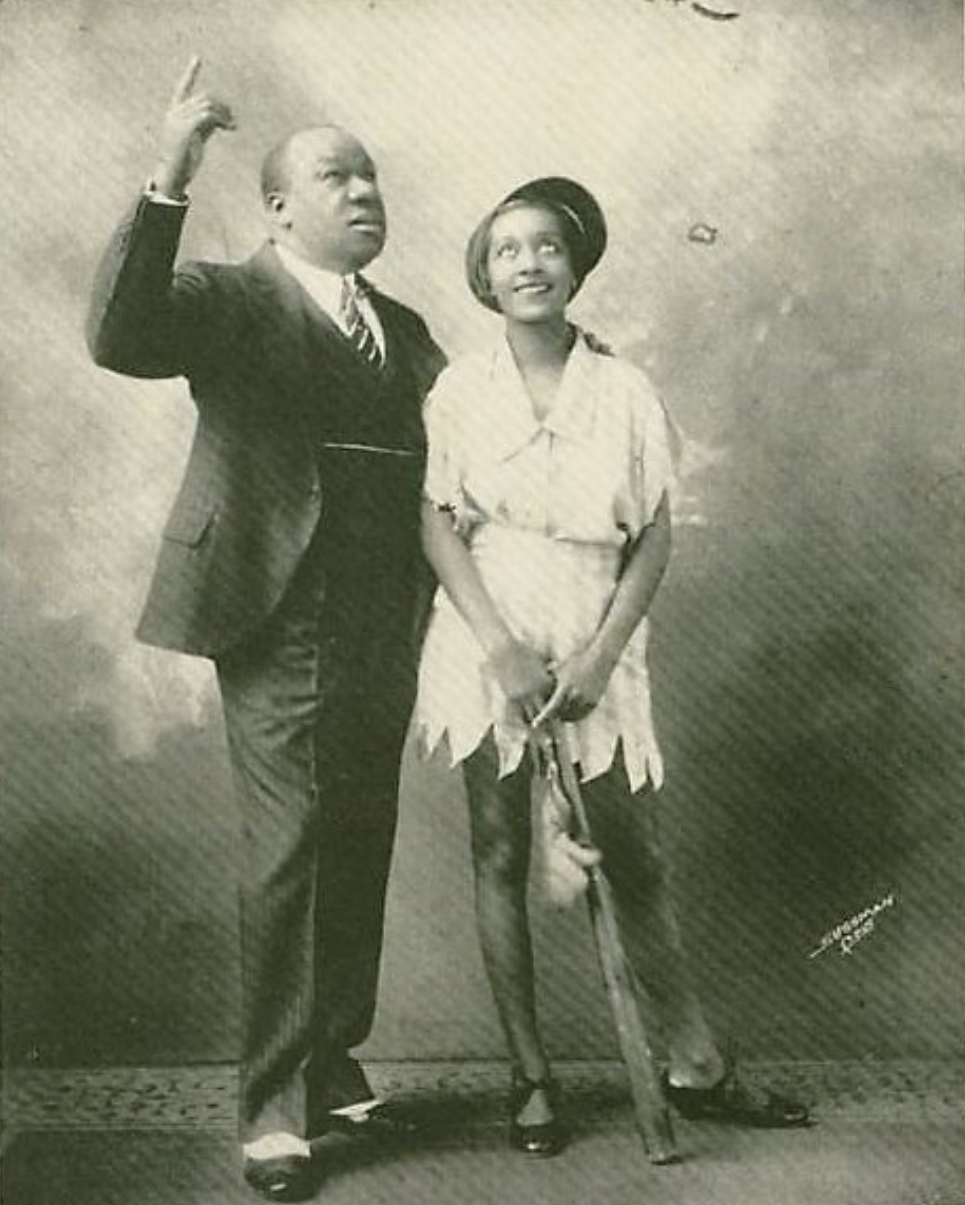
Broadway Jones (left) in a 1928 press photo for Shuffle Along Jr.

Henry A. "Broadway" Jones (April 11, 1888 – November 14, 1948), was an American singer, musical theatre actor, drummer, band leader, comedian, and nightclub owner. As a vocalist he was known for his performances of jazz music and spirituals. He had a career as a singer, actor, and comedian in vaudeville, night clubs, and on Broadway during the first half of the twentieth century.

A native of Florida, Jones began his career as a jazz drummer and singer in Jacksonville where he was active as early as 1912. By 1915 he was working as a band leader in New York City. He became a well-known musical figure during the Harlem Renaissance where he operated a jazz nightclub in the 1920s. He was a popular performer in Palm Beach, Florida, where he sang regularly from 1915 into the late 1920s, including annual engagements at the Royal Poinciana Hotel. A baritone with a rich, large voice, the song "Ol' Man River" from Oscar Hammerstein II and Jerome Kern's Show Boat (1927) was originally created with him as the intended vocalist. He was offered the role of Joe in the original cast of the musical but declined the part.

Jones was a performing partner of Eubie Blake during World War I, and again during the late 1920s and early 1930s. The pair performed together in jazz clubs, hotels, theaters, and other venues, including performing in numerous musical revues in vaudeville and on tour. Together the pair created the vaudeville revue Shuffle Along Jr. (1928), a distilled version of Blake and Sissle's landmark 1921 musical Shuffle Along. They also performed in the Broadway musical Blackbirds of 1930.

Alone, Jones starred in James P. Johnson's short-lived Broadway musical Sugar Hill (1931). In the mid-1930s he performed at the Cotton Club, on Broadway, and on tour in the Cotton Club revues created by Cab Calloway. From 1938 to 1940 he was a member of Clarence Tisdale's Tisdale Trio, and afterward performed in his own group, the Broadway Jones Trio, whose membership also included vocalist Opal Cooper. At the very end of his career he worked in partnership with the jazz pianist Earres Prince. Having never retired, he died while traveling with Prince on tour in 1948 at the age of 60.

== Early life and career ==
The son of Harry J. Jones and Mary Jones (née Mix), Henry A. Jones was born in Fernandina, Florida on April 11, 1888. His father was a farmer, and he spent his childhood working on the family farm rather than attending school. He never learned to read or write.

Jones worked as both a singer and drummer in his early career. He began working as a musician in Florida. He was active as a performer in Jacksonville when he met and befriended the singer, composer, and actor Clarence Muse in 1912. Muse encouraged Jones to relocate from Florida to New York City, and he ultimately made his way to New York by obtaining employment as a ship's steward. By 1915 he was living in New York City and working regularly at the Clef Club in Harlem as a jazz musician where he earned the nickname "Broadway" because he was always dressed in sharp-looking suits. He also led his own dance band that performed in venues across the city and on Long Island.

== Early work with Eubie Blake, Palm Beach, and Harlem ==
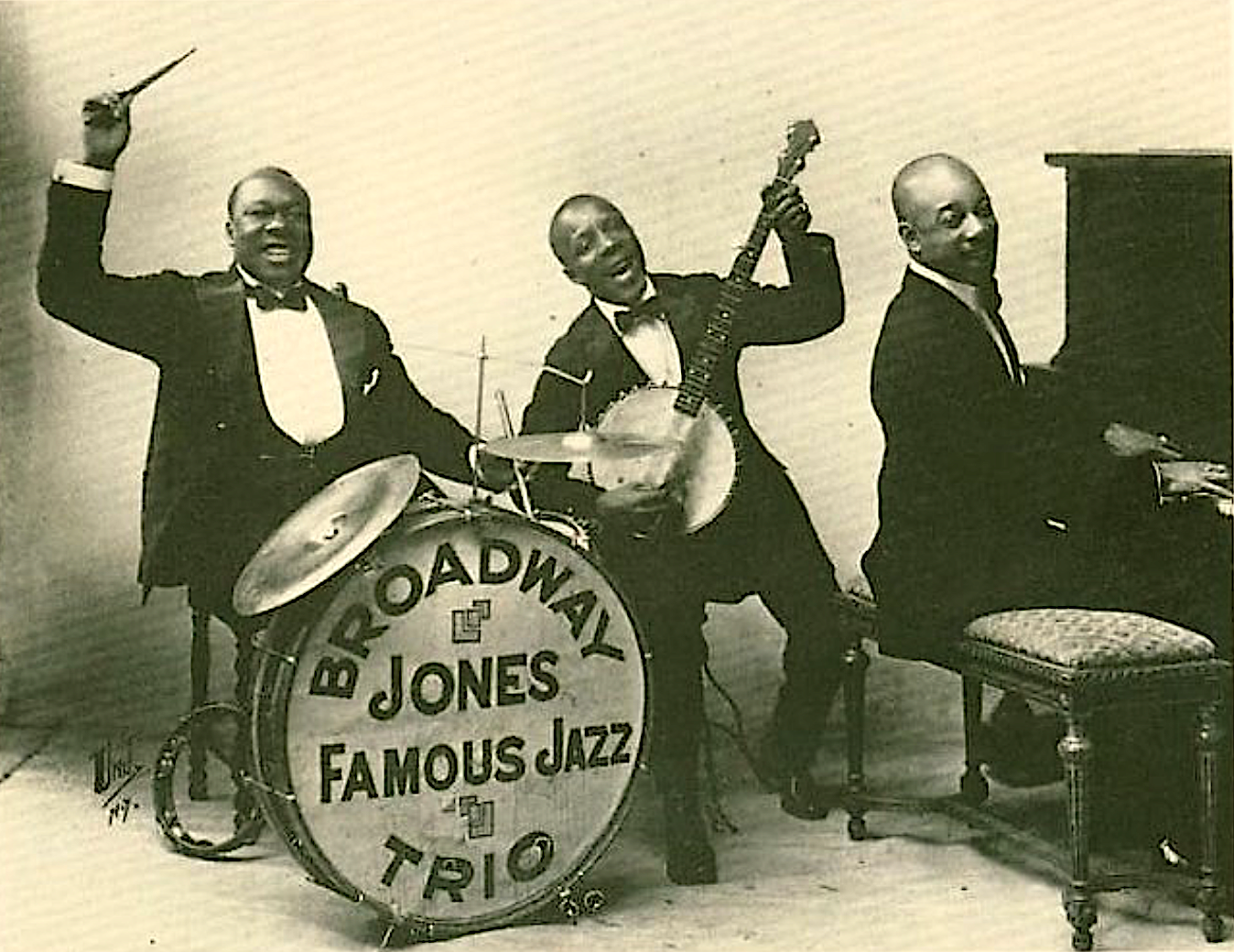
c. 1918 photograph of the Broadway Jones Trio. Jones is at the drums with Jessie Wilson as the banjoist and Eubie Blake at the pianist.

During World War I Jones worked as a performing partner with pianist Eubie Blake, initially performing together in restaurants. It is possible, but not certain, that he was the drummer in records made by the Eubie Blake Trio for Pathé Records during the war years. In 1918 Jones and Blake formed an act which toured in vaudeville with Jones working primarily as a singer. After the war, Blake's partnership with Jones ceased amicably and Blake took up a new partnership with Noble Sissle.

Jones had recurring annual touring engagements at the Royal Poinciana Hotel in Palm Beach, Florida, from 1915 into the late 1920s. He was very popular with the high society crowd in Palm Beach, and was also hired to perform at many private parties organized by that city's wealthy elite. Lyricist Oscar Hammerstein II heard Jones sing at one of these parties not long before the creation of the 1927 musical Show Boat which Hammerstein crafted with composer Jerome Kern. Later, Kern also traveled to Florida to hear Jones sing among other Black performers. Impressed with his rich baritone voice, they created the song "Ol' Man River" with Jones specifically in mind for the role of Joe. Jones was offered the part for the original Broadway production, but felt the salary he was offered was too low. Negotiations fell apart and the part of Joe was given to another performer.

In 1921 Jones recorded the songs "Baltimore Buzz" and "Dah's Gwinter Be er Landslide" for the Victor Talking Machine Company, but they never were released. That same year he starred in Spencer Williams's musical revue Put and Take which premiered at New York City's The Town Hall in September 1921. He became a well known figure in the upper social circles in Harlem during the Harlem Renaissance, and was a frequent performer at the parties and entertainments organized by socialite A'Lelia Walker.

In 1923 Jones opened a nightclub in Harlem at 65 West 129th Street near the intersection of 129th and Lenox Avenue that was known variously as the Broadway Jones Supper Club, the Broadway Jones Club, the Broadway Jones Rendezvous, and The Bamville Club. Eubie Blake was one of the musicians who played with some regularity at the club, and the Hotel Ponciana Orchestra also performed there. For a time Fletcher Henderson was pianist in the club's resident band. Other musicians who played in Jones's band at the club included banjo player Elmer Snowden; saxophonist and clarinetist Harry Carney; saxophonists Ernie Bullock and Alex Jackson; cornetist Horace Holmes; tuba and bass player Bob Ysaguirre; and trumpeter Gene Aiken, who was the brother of Gus Aiken. Snowden became temporary director of the band when Jones was engaged with performances elsewhere; and he notably hired Count Basie to play in the group as one of Basie's early professional gigs.

Jones, however, was a poor businessman, and he ultimately closed his club in 1924 after declaring bankruptcy. It was then taken over by the management of Bleich and Weber and was re-named Club Tennessee. It re-opened with Broadway Jones still performing at the club with the Hotel Ponciana Orchestra in a program headlined by singer Mamie Smith.

== Reunion with Blake ==
1927 sheet music for song "Ol' Man River" which was originally written for Jones, and which he performed with Blake as part of their act.

After several years of not performing together, Jones and Blake reunited in November 1927 for performances at Loew's State Theatre after the latter's partnership with Noble Sissle had dissolved. After this, Jones invited Blake to join him in his engagement at the Royal Poinciana Hotel in February 1928. This began a second long term period of collaboration between the two performers.

Jones and Blake put together their own theatre troupe which toured in a show called Shuffle Along Jr., a distilled version of Blake's earlier 1921 Broadway musical Shuffle Along that the two men crafted together. The cast included some of the original ensemble performers from the earlier Broadway production. Other performers included singer and dancer Katie Crippen and her partner Dewey Brown; jazz vocalist Hilda Perleno; and the nightclub performer and band leader Mae Diggs. The production played first in Paterson, New Jersey before having a run at Proctor's Theatre in Manhattan. It then toured in vaudeville's Orpheum Circuit to popular success, but poor business management made it a financial failure.

In 1929 Jones and Blake joined with Fanchon and Marco to tour in that couple's show California Capers, a work part of Fanchon and Marco's musical revue series Oddities Idea which featured a large chorus of girls. The duo performed in comedic sketches in the show in addition performing songs; one of which featured Jones singing "Ol' Man River". After this, they returned to New York City for performances at the Lafayette Theatre in Harlem in late 1929, and in December of that year made four recordings together with RCA Victor. These included the song "My Fate Is In Your Hands" by Fats Waller, and two songs by Blake: "Dissatisfied Blues", and "House Rent Lizzie". The fourth song, "Marching Home", included a vocal duet sung by Jones and Blake.

In January 1930 the Jones and Blake act was engaged once again at the Lafayette Theatre to perform a fifteen-minute comedy and music sketch in the musical revue Birth of Syncopation. It was directed by Lawrence Deas who had choreographed the original Broadway production of Shuffle Along. They performed together as a duo in several other vaudeville revues in 1930, one of which was Shaky Feet. They had particular success in a 1930 revue produced by Will Morrissey, but a decision to no longer allow racially mixed casts in the Orpheum Circuit put an end to further opportunities of this kind.

Jones and Blake rebounded by joining the Broadway cast of the 1930 version of Lew Leslie's Blackbirds musical revue series. Jones portrayed the stereotype Sambo character in the production, and his featured solo in this work was the spiritual "Roll, Jordan, Roll" which he performed with a choir led by Cecil Mack. Without Blake, Jones returned to Broadway in December 1931 as Gyp Penrose in James P. Johnson's short lived musical Sugar Hill. His songs in that musical included "Hanging Around Yo’ Door" and "Hot Harlem".

In 1931 Jones and Blake were once again performing in Fanchon and Marco's musical revue. Around this time Jones formed a band in which Blake was the pianist; the group toured through 1932 and possibly into 1933. Financial pressures of the Great Depression led Jones to disband the group. The duo later reunited briefly in the mid 1930s for concerts of "more refined" music which they performed with the Monarch Symphonic Band; an orchestra based in Harlem.

== Later life and career ==
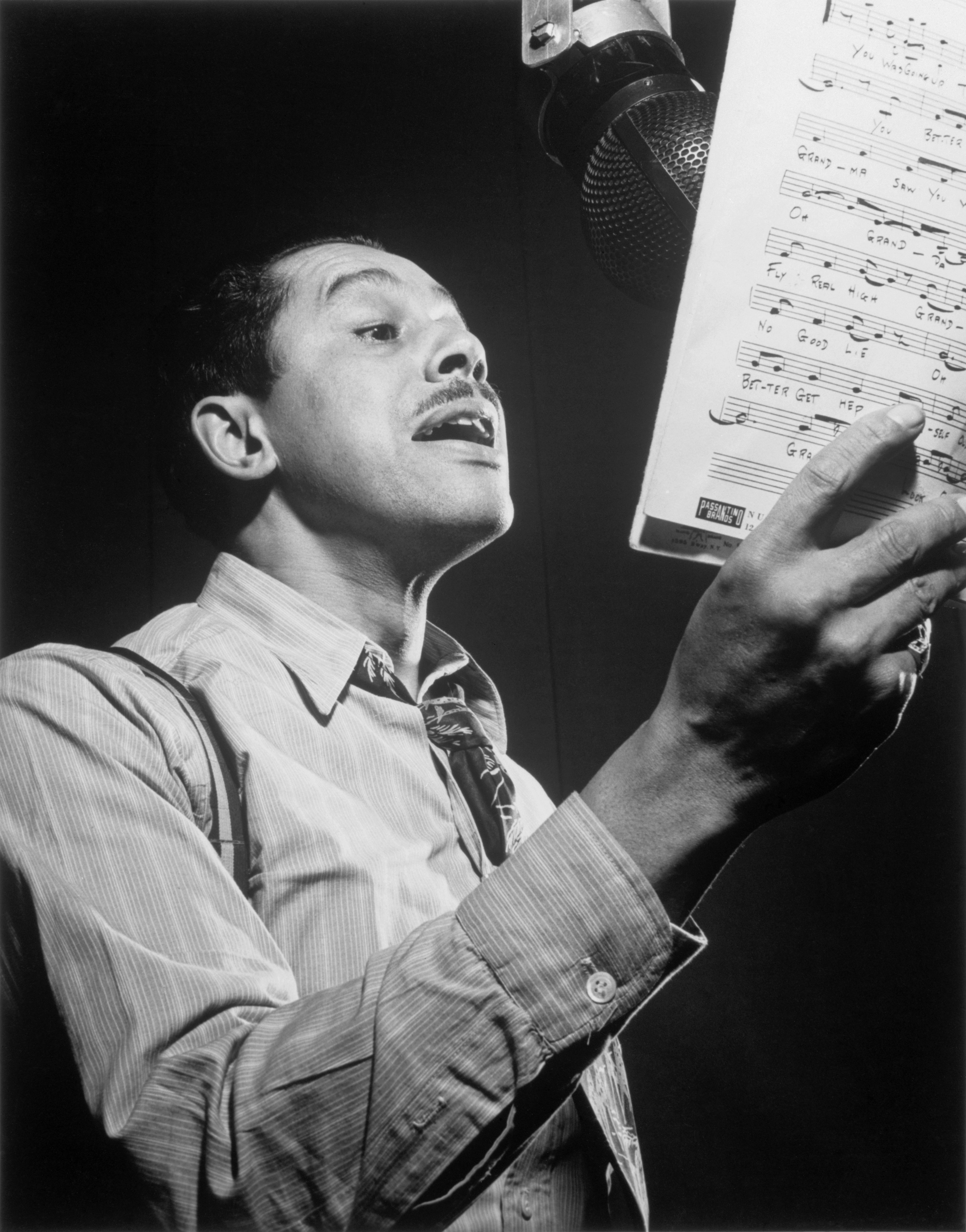
Cab Calloway in whose Cotton Club revue Jones performed in 1936

In 1936 Jones was engaged at the Cotton Club as a performer in Will Vodery and Cab Calloway's revue Cotton Club Parade. Just prior to this engagement he had toured nationally in Calloway's Cotton Club revue. The 1936 Cotton Club Parade was the most lavish Cotton Club revue during its thirteen year history, and included a run on Broadway. Its cast was led by Calloway and Bill Robinson.

Jones became a member of Clarence Tisdale's Tisdale Trio during its final years, performing with that group as early as 1938. It was active as late as 1940 with Tisdale, Jones, and the pianist Carroll Boyd as the group's final lineup. In 1942 and 1943 he was performing in night clubs in New York with his group, the Broadway Jones Trio. The trio consisted of Jones, fellow singer Opal Cooper, and pianist Freddie Brown who also sang in addition to playing the keyboard.

Jones died in Weatherly, Pennsylvania, on November 14, 1948, at the age of 60. His death from a heart attack occurred aboard a train which had just left Hazleton, Pennsylvania, bound for New York City. He was traveling with his current music collaborator, the jazz pianist Earres Prince, at that time; with the pair having just completed a week of performance at Chic Sacco's in Hazleton.
