= Broadway Theatre (53rd Street) =

Broadway theater in Manhattan, New York

- Universal's Colony Theatre; B.S. Moss's Broadway Theatre; Earl Carroll's Broadway Theatre; Ciné Roma
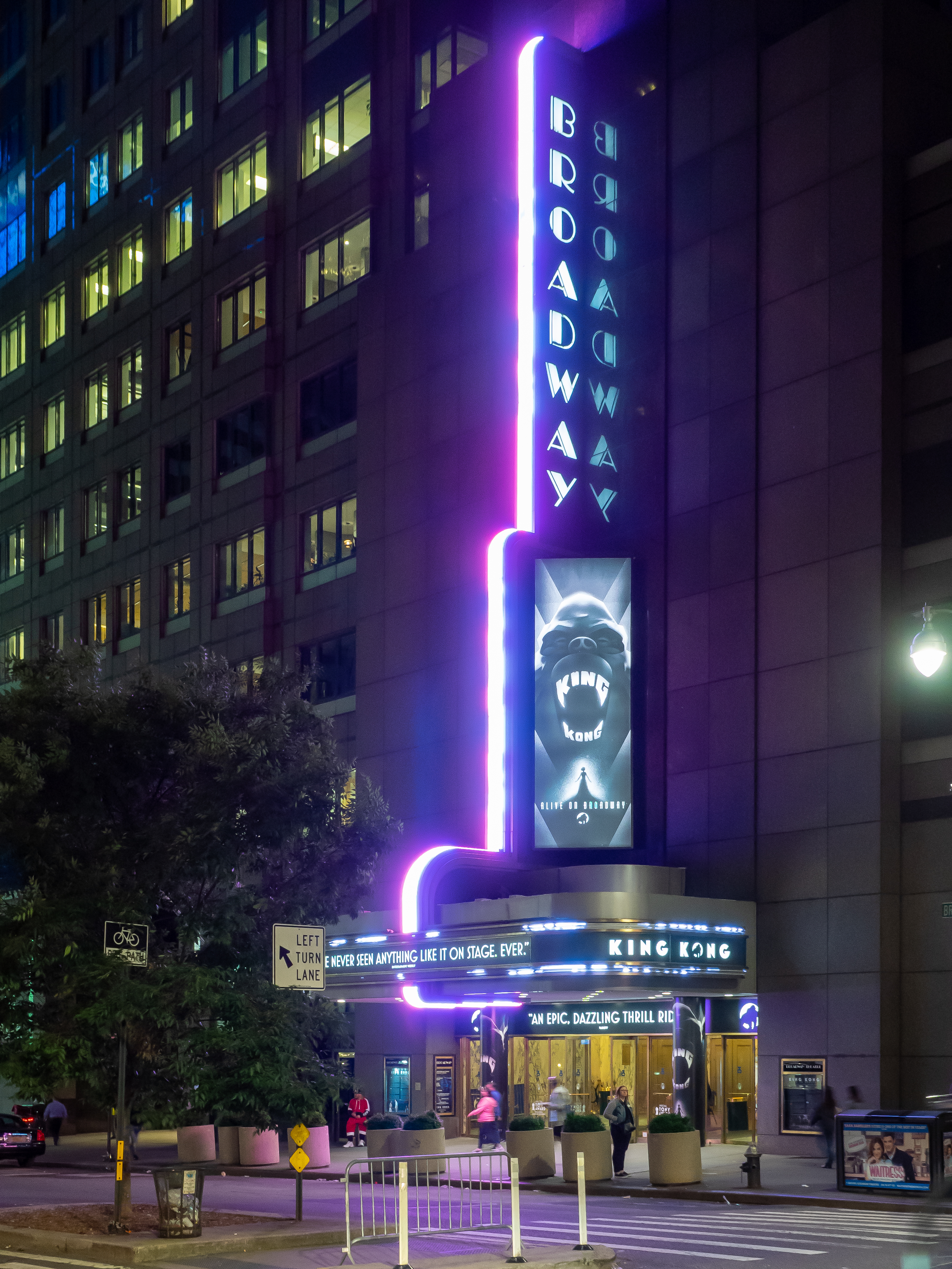
- The Broadway Theatre in 2019, playing King Kong
- Interactive map of Broadway Theatre
- Address: 1681 Broadway; Manhattan, New York; United States
- Coordinates: 40°45′48″N 73°58′59″W
- Owner: The Shubert Organization
- Capacity: 1,763
- Type: Broadway
- Production: The Great Gatsby

Construction
- Opened: December 25, 1924 (101 years ago)
- Rebuilt: 1930; 1986
- Years active: 1924–1930, 1947, 1952–1953 (movie theater); 1930–present (Broadway theater)
- Architect: Eugene De Rosa

Website
- www.shubert.nyc/theatres/broadway

The Broadway Theatre (formerly Universal's Colony Theatre, B.S. Moss's Broadway Theatre, Earl Carroll's Broadway Theatre, and Ciné Roma) is a Broadway theater at 1681 Broadway (near 53rd Street) in the Theater District of Midtown Manhattan in New York City, New York, U.S. Opened in 1924, the theater was designed by Eugene De Rosa for Benjamin S. Moss, who originally operated the venue as a movie theater. It has approximately 1,763 seats across two levels and is operated by The Shubert Organization. The Broadway Theatre is one of the few Broadway theaters that is physically on Broadway.

The Broadway's facade was originally designed in the Italian Renaissance style and was made of brick and terracotta. The modern facade of the theater is made of polished granite and is part of the office building at 1675 Broadway, completed in 1990. The auditorium contains an orchestra level, one balcony, and box seats. The modern design of the auditorium dates to a 1986 renovation, when Oliver Smith redecorated the theater in a reddish color scheme. The office building is cantilevered above the auditorium.

B.S. Moss's Colony Theatre opened on Christmas Day 1924 and was originally leased to Universal Pictures Corporation. Moss renovated the venue for legitimate shows and reopened it as the Broadway Theatre on December 8, 1930. The theater had several operators over the next decade, and it switched between hosting legitimate shows, movies, and vaudeville. Lee Shubert and Clifford Fischer took over the Broadway Theatre in December 1939, and the Shubert family bought the theater in 1940. Since then, the Broadway has largely been used as a legitimate theater, though it was briefly used for movies in 1947 and in 1952–1953. The Broadway was extensively rebuilt in the late 1980s. Over the years, it has hosted many long-running musicals that have transferred from other theaters, as well as other long-lasting shows such as Evita, Les Misérables, and Miss Saigon.

== Description ==
=== Buildings ===
The Broadway Theatre is at the southwest corner of Broadway and 53rd Street in the Theater District of Midtown Manhattan in New York City, New York, U.S. It is one of the few active Broadway theaters that are physically on Broadway. (Note: The Winter Garden Theatre also has its main entrance on Broadway. The Palace Theatre had an entrance on Broadway until 2018, when it closed for renovation; its new entrance will be on 47th Street.)

==== Original structure ====
Its original exterior was designed in the Italian Renaissance style and was made of brick and terracotta. The exterior contained a double-height electric sign. The original building covered 15,000 square feet (1,400 m^{2}); there was 1,150 square feet (107 m^{2}) of office space above the theater's lobby and two stores on Broadway. In addition, there was a wrought-iron ticket booth. There were 18 exits, allowing it to be evacuated within three minutes. Due to the presence of the now-demolished Sixth Avenue elevated line on 53rd Street, the theater had soundproof double doors on that street.

==== Current building ====
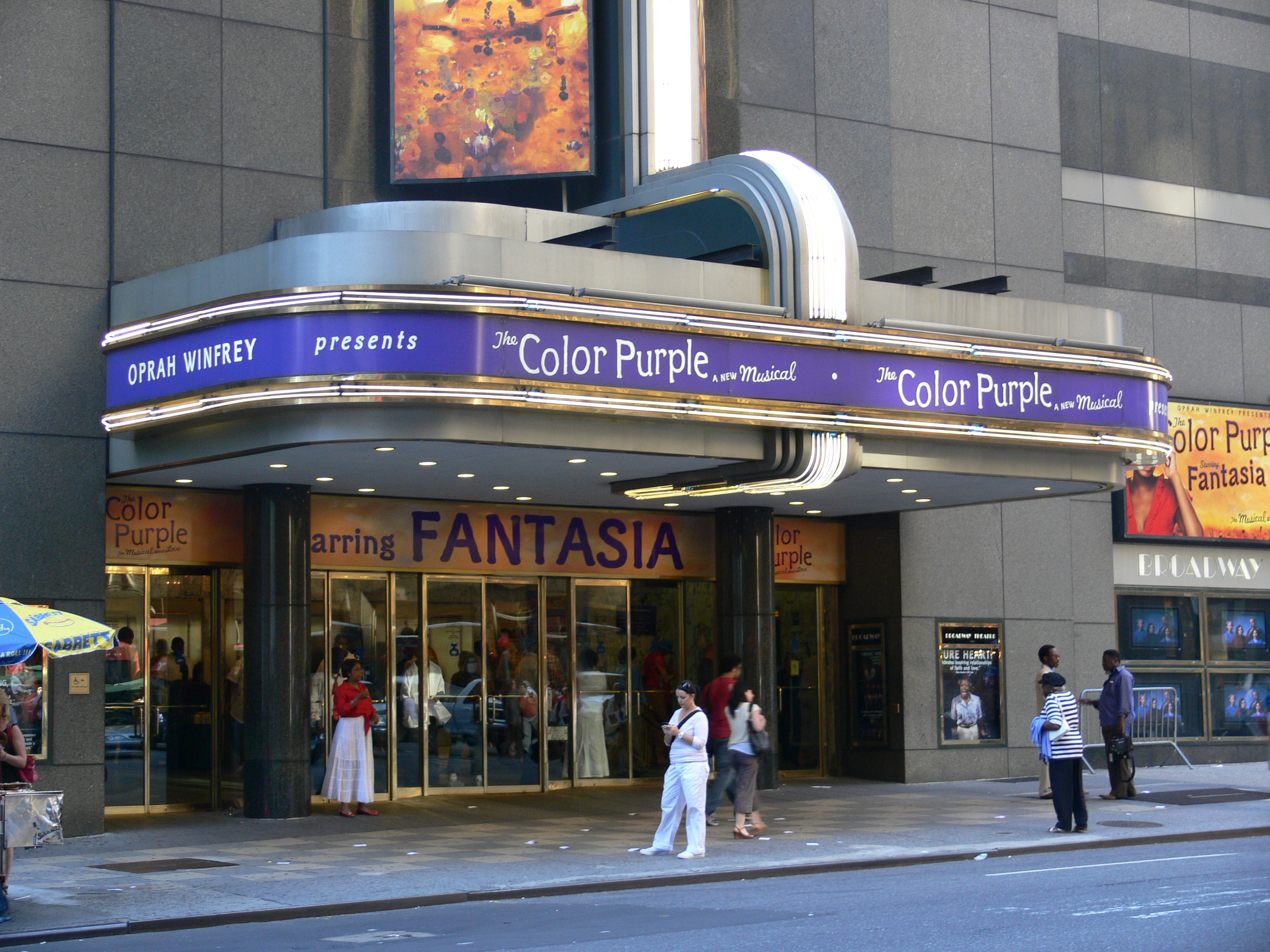
Entrance, showing The Color Purple

The modern facade of the theater (which has its own address at 1681 Broadway) is part of the 1675 Broadway office building, completed in 1990. The facade of 1675 Broadway, designed by Fox & Fowle, consists of polished granite in deep-green and greenish-gray hues. The seven-story facade on Broadway, which contains the entrance, was refaced in a similar material, with contemporary and Art Deco-style decorations. There is an Art Deco marquee in front of the theater as well. The massing consists of several horizontal and vertical setbacks, inspired by the massing of 30 Rockefeller Plaza. The lower stories have recessed windows; the upper-story windows are surrounded by flame-finished granite panels, which give the impression of depth. When 1675 Broadway was constructed, the theater's air rights were used to increase the height of the office building.

The office building's seventh and eighth stories contain large trusses above the theater, which cantilever the upper stories over the theater at a depth of 45 feet (14 m). There are six trusses spanning the theater from north to south; the largest truss weighs 200 short tons (180 long tons; 180 t). The office building's ninth and tenth stories each contain 28,000 square feet (2,600 m^{2}) of space, while the next ten stories each contain 24,000 square feet (2,200 m^{2}). The upper floors taper to 16,000 square feet (1,500 m^{2}). The building has 35 stories and 750,000 square feet (70,000 m^{2}) in total. There was mixed architectural commentary of the current building's design. Although Paul Goldberger called the building "exceptionally handsome, even dignified", another critic described the structure as "unpleasantly monolithic".

=== Auditorium ===
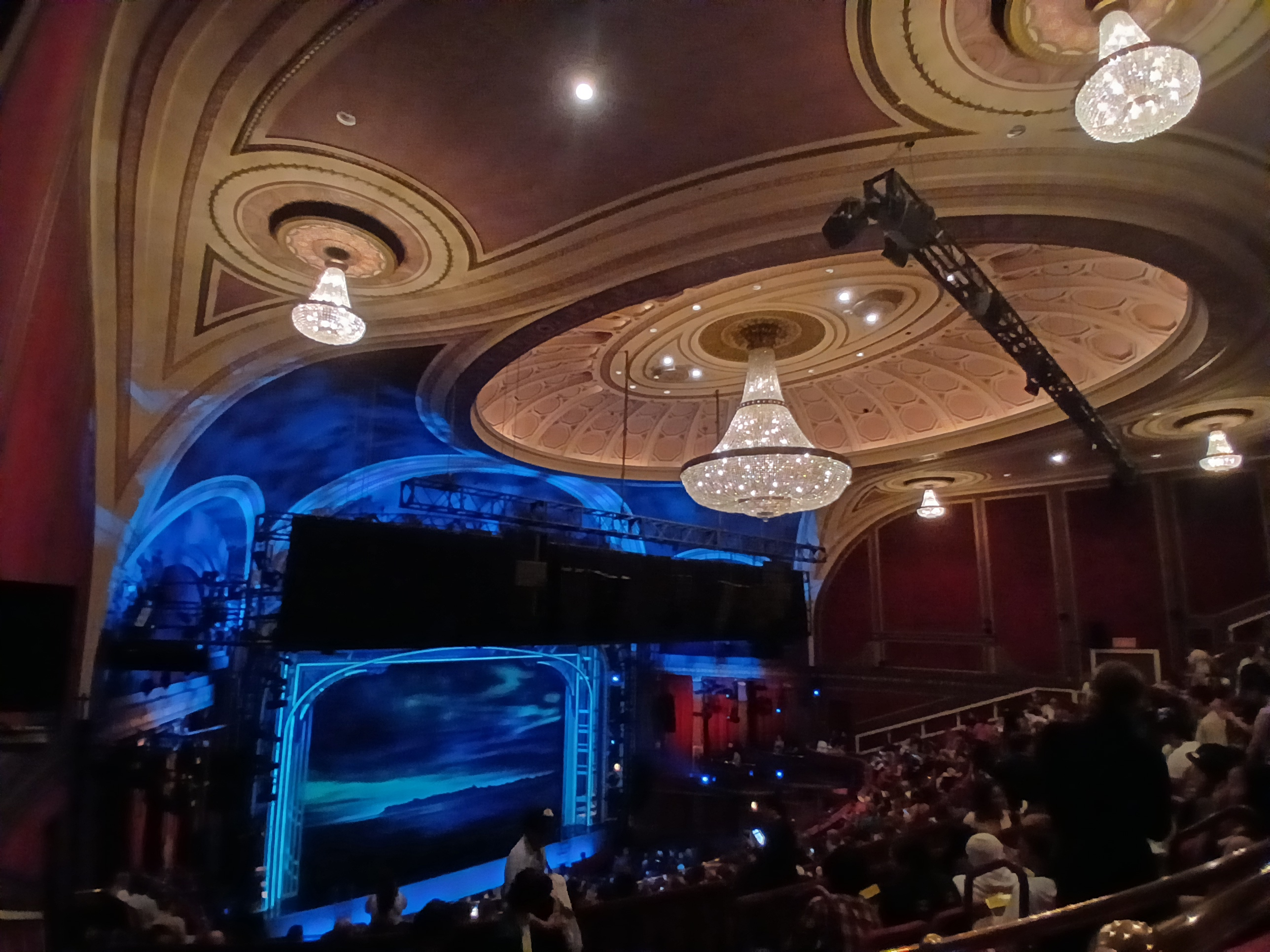
The auditorium interior

The Broadway Theatre has an orchestra, one mezzanine-level balcony, and boxes. According to the Shubert Organization, the theater has 1,763 seats. Meanwhile, Ken Bloom describes the theater as having 1,765 seats; The Broadway League gives a contrasting figure of 1,761 seats; and Playbill cites 1,738 seats. The physical seats are divided into 909 seats in the orchestra, 250 at the front of the mezzanine, 584 at the rear of the mezzanine, and 20 in the boxes. In the early 20th century, the theater had 2,500 seats. When the theater opened, the balcony level was carried by a 40-short-ton (36-long-ton; 36 t) girder, supported solely by the side walls. This allowed the entire theater to be a column-free space.

The Broadway Theatre was decorated ornately with marble and bronze. The color scheme was largely composed of gold, white, bronze, and gray decorations. One critic described the theater as having pink and gold decorations, crystal lighting, and soft carpets. In the mid-20th century, the theater was repainted in a blue color scheme, which set designer Oliver Smith likened to "a coal mine". Smith redecorated the theater in a reddish color scheme in 1986, since he felt red was the "color that arouses emotion". At the front of the theater was an organ that could be raised or lowered, as well as a projector in the orchestra pit. In the 2000s, the Broadway's orchestra pit was one of the largest in a Broadway theater.

The proscenium opening measures about 46 feet 6 inches (14.17 m) wide and 27 feet (8.2 m) tall. The depth of the auditorium to the proscenium is 54 feet 3 inches (16.54 m), while the depth to the front of the stage is 57 feet 4 inches (17.48 m). The stage was originally 20 feet (6.1 m) deep, but it was expanded in 1930 to 55 feet (17 m) deep by 90 feet (27 m) wide. Following these modifications, the stage also had three lifts. There were dressing rooms for 200 performers, as well as space for up to 50 stage crew members. The Broadway has long been a popular theater for producers of musicals because of its large seating capacity, and the large stage. Successful shows in smaller theaters have frequently transferred to the Broadway Theatre.

== History ==
Times Square became the epicenter for large-scale theater productions between 1900 and the Great Depression. Manhattan's theater district had begun to shift from Union Square and Madison Square during the first decade of the 20th century. From 1901 to 1920, forty-three theaters were built around Broadway in Midtown Manhattan. Additionally, movie palaces became common in the 1920s between the end of World War I and the beginning of the Great Depression. The Colony Theatre, as the current Broadway Theatre on 53rd Street was originally known, was developed as a movie palace by B. S. Moss, who had previously operated the now-demolished Broadway Theatre on 41st Street.

=== Development and early years ===
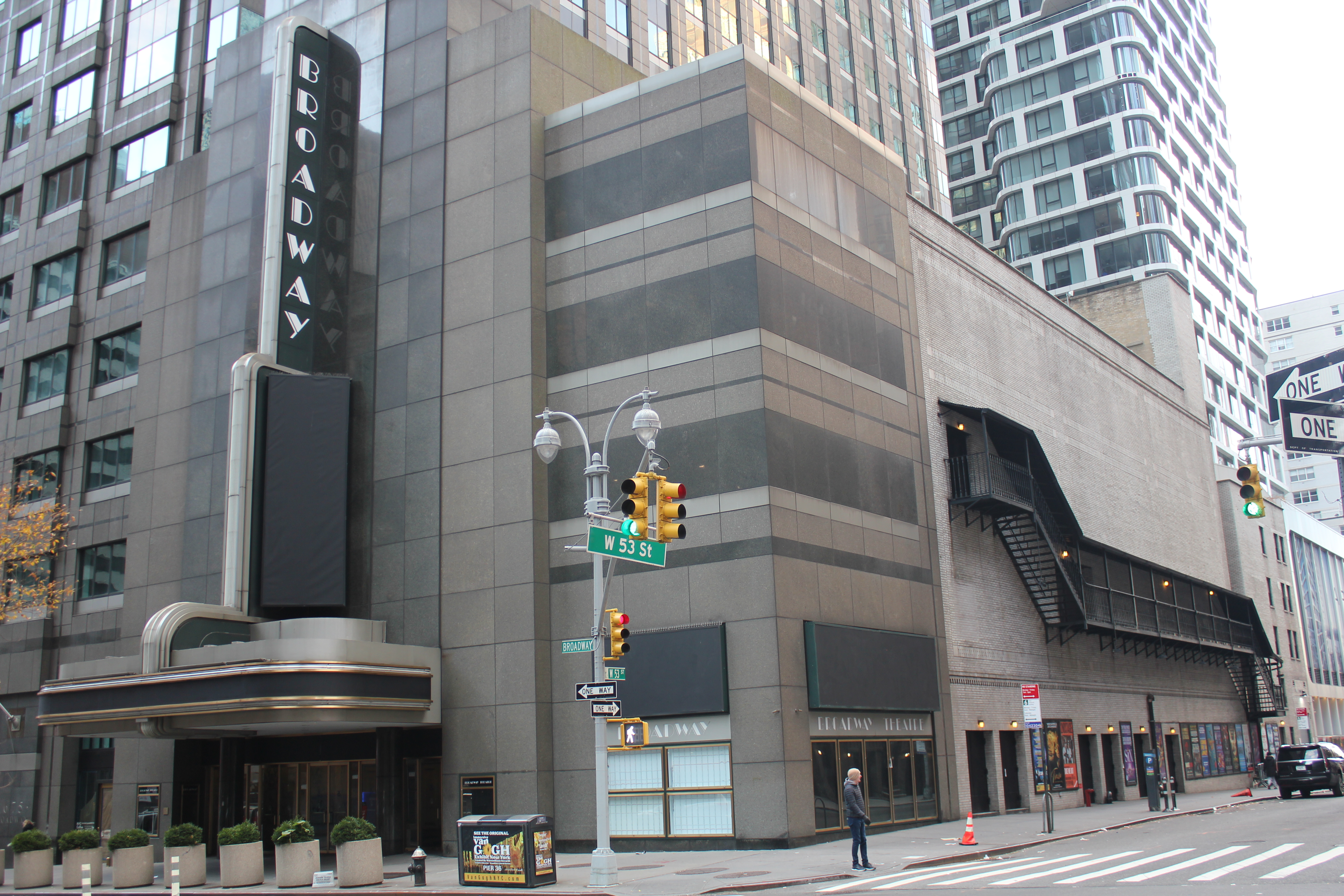
View of the Broadway Theatre as seen across Broadway and 53rd Street

In 1923, the Neponsit Building Company acquired the five-story Standard Storage Warehouse and three dwellings at the corner of Broadway and 53rd Street. That July, Eugene de Rosa filed plans for a theater and office building on the site, which was to cost $350,000. The site measured 56 feet (17 m) on Broadway and 112 feet (34 m) on 53rd Street, with a wing extending 18 feet (5.5 m) along 52nd Street. The theater was to be used for vaudeville and films. By mid-1924, Moss was developing the theater, which still had no name. Moss announced in mid-December 1924 that the theater would be named the Colony, and Edwin Franko Goldman was hired to lead the Colony's orchestra. The theater cost $2 million to complete and was originally leased to Universal Pictures Corporation.

B. S. Moss's Colony Theatre opened on December 25, 1924, with the film The Thief of Bagdad. Soon after the theater opened, Moss installed an automated air-cooling system in the theater. The Colony began screening movies during early mornings in October 1925, starting with The Freshman. In its early years, the Colony screened Universal films such as Friendly Enemies, A Woman's Faith, The Flaming Frontier, and The Cat and the Canary. Additionally, the theater hosted a weekly "lingerie revue" with fashion models. Moss left the vaudeville business in late 1927, retaining the Colony as his only theater.

In early 1928, WABC announced that it would begin broadcasting concerts from the venue on Sundays. After the film We Americans flopped in April 1928, the Colony closed temporarily, and Moss considered leasing it for vaudeville. Theatrical operator Florenz Ziegfeld Jr. was negotiating to lease the Colony that June, but he initially balked because he considered the $225,000 annual rent to be too expensive. By that August, Ziegfeld had tentatively agreed to lease the Colony for musical productions and renovate the theater. Meanwhile, the Colony resumed screenings during late 1928. Among those were Steamboat Willie, screened that November as the first Mickey Mouse cartoon to be released to the public, and a documentary about the New York Stock Exchange, screened that December.

=== Alternating live shows and film ===
==== 1930s ====
Moss took back the Colony Theatre in February 1930 and announced that he would begin hosting musicals there. He expanded the Colony into an adjacent parcel; according to The New York Times, "the theatre was gutted until only its four walls remained." The auditorium was also expanded to 2,000 seats. The venue became Moss's Broadway Theatre, since that name had been freed up by the demolition of the old Broadway Theatre on 41st Street. The Broadway's first legitimate show, The New Yorkers by Cole Porter, opened on December 8, 1930; at the time, it was the largest Broadway theater. Moss claimed that the theater would only host shows with "a price scale that is within the reach of every man's pocketbook", but tickets for The New Yorkers cost up to $5.50, which during the Great Depression was unaffordable for many people. The New Yorkers closed in May 1931, after which the theater stood dark for several months.

In September 1931, Moss announced that he would simultaneously present musical revues and talking pictures at the Broadway for twelve weeks. The theater then reverted to live shows. Moss sold the theater in July 1932 to Amalgamated Properties Inc. The same year, Earl Carroll took over the theater, which was renamed Earl Carroll's Broadway Theatre. The Broadway hosted The Earl Carroll Vanities, which featured Milton Berle, Helen Broderick, and Harriet Hoctor and ran for 11 weeks. By February 1933, Associated Artists Productions was hosting an opera series at the Broadway. Stanley Lawton then leased the theater, and the Broadway began showing vaudeville that November. The theater once again hosted opera performances in 1934. The Broadway's next legitimate show was the operetta The O'Flynn, which opened in December 1934 and closed after a week. The Broadway Theatre was leased to the Chasebee Theatre Corporation in August 1935 as part of a receivership proceeding against the Prudence Company.

The theater then switched once more to showing films, reopening as B. S. Moss's Broadway Theatre on October 12, 1935. The Broadway screened double features accompanied by short stage shows. The vaudevillian Gus Edwards leased the Broadway in March 1936 and renamed the theater Gus Edwards' Sho-Window. Edwards began showing vaudeville at the Broadway the next month, but it only lasted for two weeks. The Nuvo Mondo Motion Pictures Corporation then leased the Broadway Theatre in February 1937. The venue was renamed the Ciné Roma and began showing Italian films. Lee Shubert and Clifford Fischer took over the Broadway Theatre in December 1939, renovating the theater to accommodate the Folies Bergère revue, which only ran until February 1940.

==== 1940s and early 1950s ====
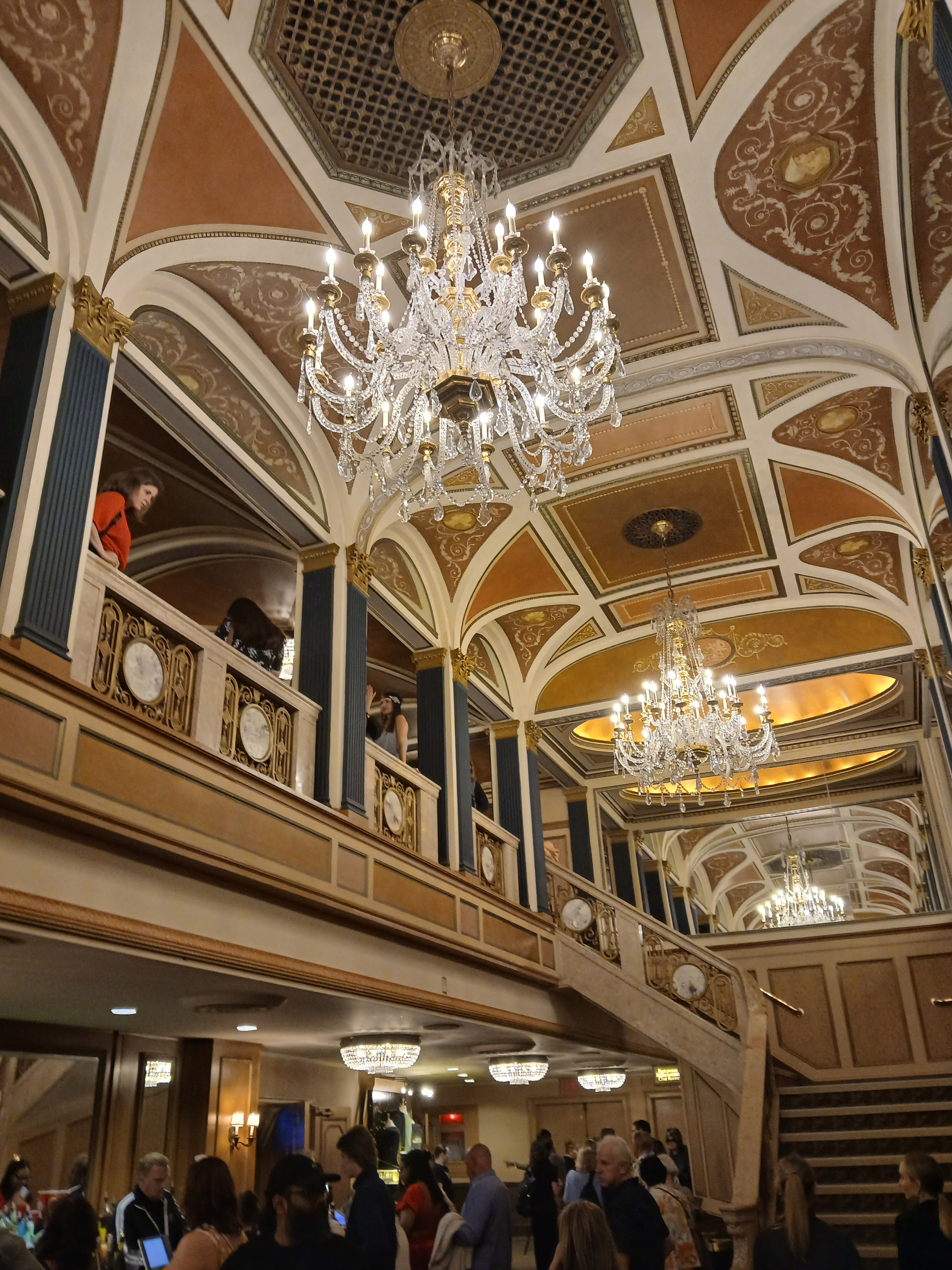
Interior of the lobby

The Broadway then hosted long-running musicals that had transferred from other theaters, beginning with Rodgers and Hart's Too Many Girls in April 1940. To raise money for British soldiers during World War II, Walt Disney showed his feature film Fantasia in November 1940; it was the first Disney film rendered in Fantasound, an early stereo system. This was followed in 1942 by the Irving Berlin musical This Is The Army; a season of productions from the New Opera Company; and a transfer of the comedy My Sister Eileen. In 1943, the Broadway hosted the musical Lady in the Dark, the operetta The Student Prince, and performances by the San Carlo Opera Company in repertory. The same year, theatrical operator Michael Todd reneged on a plan to lease the Broadway, and the Yaw Theatre Corporation took over the theater. The Shubert family's Trebuhs Realty Company acquired the Broadway in July 1943. That December, Billy Rose brought his operetta Carmen Jones to the Broadway Theatre; it ran for 503 performances.

The play The Tempest and the musical Memphis Bound! had brief runs in 1945, followed by a transfer of Up in Central Park that June, which lasted nine months. In mid-1946, the Shuberts acquired the 25-foot-wide (7.6 m) plot at the corner of Broadway and 53rd Street; the theater building had already been extended into the corner lot, but that part of the theater had previously been leased from the landowner. Also in 1946, the Broadway hosted transfers of the operetta Song of Norway and the play A Flag Is Born; a season of ballet; and Duke Ellington and John La Touche's musical Beggar's Holiday.

After Beggar's Holiday closed in March 1947, United Artists leased the Broadway as a movie theater, paying $5,000 a week for one year. The first film UA screened at the theater was Charlie Chaplin's Monsieur Verdoux that April. The Broadway Theatre was unprofitable and closed in July 1947 due to lack of films, but it reopened in September for the New York premiere of the banned film The Outlaw starring Jane Russell. The Cradle Will Rock relocated to the Broadway in early 1948, followed the same year by a limited repertory engagement by the Habimah Players, a three-week concert series, and a transfer of High Button Shoes. The Spanish revue Cabalgata opened at the theater in July 1949, running for three months.

The Katherine Dunham Company performed at the Broadway in 1950, followed by Olsen and Johnson's musical Pardon Our French, which flopped after 100 performances. In 1951, the Broadway hosted transfers of the musical Where's Charley? and the play The Green Pastures, as well as a limited engagement of the musical Oklahoma!. Mae West's Diamond Lil had a brief run later that year. It was followed in early 1952 by Kiss Me, Kate, ANTA's version of Four Saints in Three Acts and the all-Black revue Shuffle Along. Lee Shubert leased the theater in mid-1952 to Cinerama Productions, which added a wide screen for Cinerama films. The Broadway reopened as a Cinerama theater on September 30, 1952, with the film This Is Cinerama, which transferred to the Warner Theatre in February 1953. The venue returned to legitimate use in June 1953, hosting the final performances of the long-running musical South Pacific.

=== Exclusive use as legitimate theater ===
==== Late 1950s to 1970s ====
Les Ballets de Paris and dancer José Greco performed at the theater in 1954, and the operetta The Saint of Bleecker Street opened there at the end of the year. The Broadway hosted several live engagements in late 1955, including those by dancer Antonio, the Comédie-Française, the Katherine Dunham Company, and the Azuma Kabuki Troupe. Next was the musical Mr. Wonderful with Sammy Davis Jr., which opened in March 1956 and had 383 performances. The musical Shinbone Alley lasted for one month in early 1957, and The Most Happy Fella transferred to the Broadway later the same year. The Broadway hosted another short-lived musical in 1958, The Body Beautiful. This was followed the same year by Ballets de Paris, the Ballet Español, the Théâtre National Populaire, and the Old Vic. In addition, the Broadway hosted the Bolshoi Theatre's version of West Side Story in early 1959. The Broadway was refurbished before the opening of Jule Styne and Stephen Sondheim's musical Gypsy in May 1959.

The theater hosted several musicals from 1960 to 1962, as well as the American Ballet Theatre in 1961 and Martha Graham's dance troupe in 1962. The musical Tovarich with Vivien Leigh and Jean-Pierre Aumont opened in 1963, as did the Obratsov Russian Puppet Theatre and the Noël Coward musical The Girl Who Came to Supper. The Broadway then hosted the Folies Bergère and the revue Zizi with Zizi Jeanmaire in 1964. The musical Baker Street and the play The Devils were staged in 1965, followed the next year by another musical, A Time for Singing. The Lincoln Center Theater's production of the musical Annie Get Your Gun moved to the Broadway in September 1966, and the musical Funny Girl came at the end of the year. The Harkness Ballet performed at the Broadway for three weeks in late 1967, and the Kander and Ebb musical The Happy Time ran for 286 performances in 1968. This was followed by transfers of the musicals Cabaret and Mame from other theaters.

In late 1969, the Shuberts proposed razing the Broadway and constructing a skyscraper with a theater at its base. The project would use a zoning bonus that allowed office-building developers to erect theaters in exchange for additional office space. The New York City Planning Commission approved a zoning permit for the planned 43-story building in May 1970. The project would include a three-level, 1,800-seat theater as well as a shopping arcade between 52nd and 53rd Street. The Shuberts postponed this plan indefinitely in 1971 due to declining demand for office space. Meanwhile, the musical Purlie opened at the Broadway in March 1970. It was followed by Fiddler on the Roof, which transferred to the Broadway in December 1970 and became the longest-running Broadway show just before its closing in 1972. The theater also hosted the 26th Tony Awards in April 1972. The Broadway was renovated at a cost of $100,000 prior to the opening of the musical Dude in October 1972. The show lasted for only two weeks, and the theater's original layout was restored.

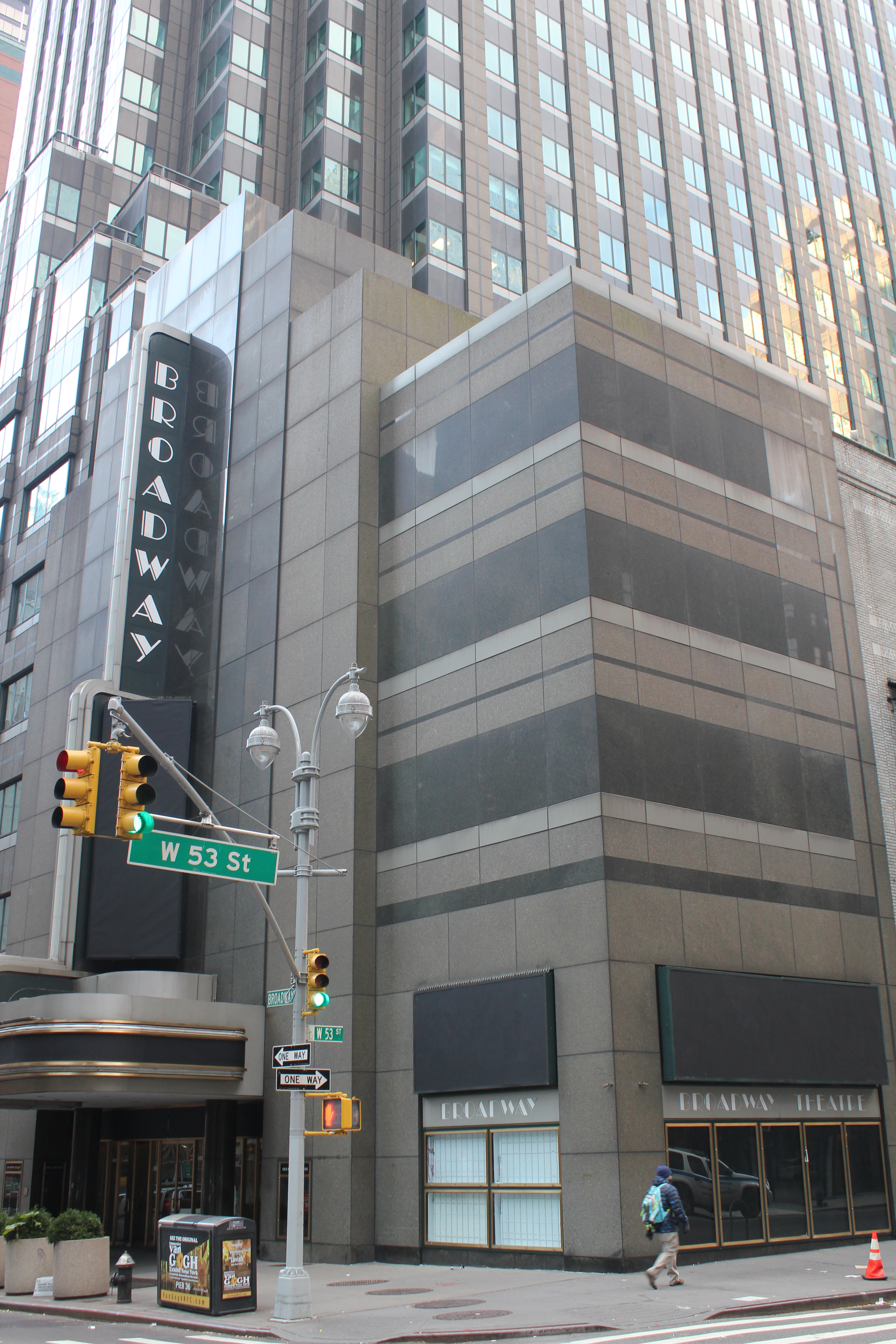
The Broadway Theatre, seen from the base of 1675 Broadway

The Chelsea Theater Center's version of the operetta Candide opened in March 1974 and ran for close to two years. The theater's capacity was reduced to 900 seats to accommodate the production. This was followed in July 1976 by a version of the musical Guys and Dolls with an all-Black cast; it lasted until the next February. Greek singer Nana Mouskouri then performed at the Broadway in April 1977. Another all-Black musical, The Wiz, moved to the Broadway in mid-1977 and stayed for one-and-a-half years. The musical I Remember Mama had been booked at the Broadway, but it was relocated to make way for the musical Saravá, which opened in March 1979 and flopped after four months. That September saw the opening of Andrew Lloyd Webber and Tim Rice's musical Evita, which lasted 1,568 performances over the next four years.

==== 1980s and 1990s ====
By the early 1980s, the Shuberts were looking to sell adjacent land, though they did not want to demolish the theater. The New York City Landmarks Preservation Commission (LPC) had started considering protecting the Broadway as a landmark in 1982, with discussions continuing over the next several years. The same year, the city government had enacted a law providing zoning bonuses for large new buildings in West Midtown. Following the rezoning, the Shubert Organization leased the Broadway's 40,000-square-foot (3,700 m^{2}) site to the Rudin Organization, which constructed the 1675 Broadway office building on the site in the late 1980s. The musical Zorba with Anthony Quinn opened in October 1983 and ran for nearly a year. It was followed in November 1984 by the musical The Three Musketeers, which only lasted nine performances. In 1985, the Broadway hosted a revival of Rodgers and Hammerstein's musical The King and I; this was the last Broadway appearance of Yul Brynner, who had starred in the musical's original 1951 run.

The Shuberts renovated the Broadway's interior for $8 million prior to the April 1986 opening of the musical Big Deal, which flopped after 70 performances. Elvis Costello hosted a rock concert that October, and the popular musical Les Misérables opened at the Broadway in March 1987. While the LPC commenced a wide-ranging effort to grant landmark status to Broadway theaters in 1987, the Broadway was among the few theaters for which the LPC denied either exterior or interior landmark status. (Note: Only the Broadway, Nederlander, and Ritz theaters were denied both interior and exterior landmark status. Several other theaters had either their exterior or interior landmark status rejected, but not both. Hearings for several theaters on 42nd Street were deferred to 2016, when they were rejected.) It was also the Shuberts' only Broadway theater that was not designated as a landmark. The theater's exterior was renovated with the construction of 1675 Broadway. The musical Miss Saigon was booked for the theater in early 1990, forcing the relocation of Les Misérables. Miss Saigon opened in April 1991, running at the Broadway for 4,095 performances through January 2001. During the 1990s and 2000s, The Late Show With David Letterman (produced at the nearby Ed Sullivan Theater) often taped pranks in front of the Broadway's 53rd Street facade, which was soon filled with show posters.

==== 2000s to present ====
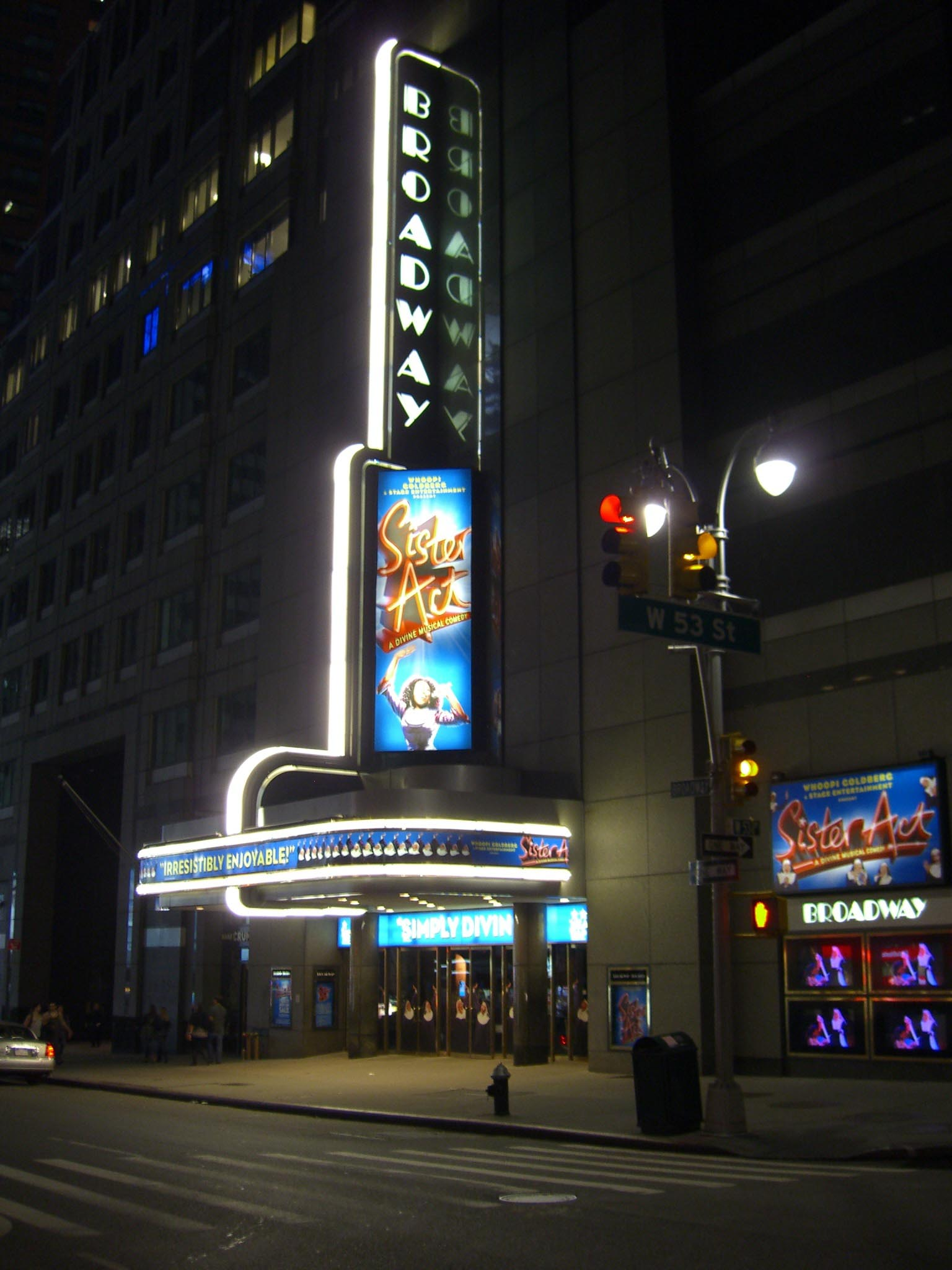
The Broadway Theatre during the run of Sister Act, c. 2011

The Broadway's first new production of the 2000s was the musical Blast!, which opened in April 2001 and ran for 180 performances. Robin Williams hosted his Robin Williams: Live on Broadway comedy show at the Broadway in 2002, winning several Emmy Awards. The opera La Bohème opened the same year and ran for 228 performances, followed in 2003 by John Leguizamo's one-man show Sexaholix. The musical Bombay Dreams had 284 performances in 2004, and the musical The Color Purple then opened in December 2005, running for 910 performances until early 2008. The acrobatic show Cirque Dreams had a limited run at the Broadway in mid-2008, and Shrek The Musical opened at the end of that year, running for 441 performances.

The musical Promises, Promises was revived in 2010 for 291 performances, followed the next year by the original production of the musical Sister Act, which had 561 performances. Frankie Valli and the Four Seasons also performed at the Broadway in late 2012. Subsequently, the theater hosted Douglas Carter Beane's version of Cinderella, which opened in 2013 and ran for 770 performances over the next two years. The musical Doctor Zhivago had a short run in mid-2015, but a revival of Fiddler on the Roof was more successful, opening at the end of 2015 and running for a full year. Another revival to play at the Broadway was Miss Saigon, which opened in 2017 and ran for ten months. The theater then hosted the Rocktopia rock concert in early 2018, followed the same year by the musical King Kong, which had 324 performances.

The Broadway hosted yet another revival, West Side Story, which opened in February 2020. The theater closed on March 12, 2020, due to the COVID-19 pandemic, and the revival of West Side Story closed permanently. The Broadway reopened on April 11, 2022, with the musical The Little Prince, which ran for one month. This was to have been followed in late 2022 by a series of concerts performed by rock band Weezer, but the concerts were canceled in August 2022 because of poor ticket sales. The musical Here Lies Love opened at the theater in July 2023 and closed after four months. The musical The Great Gatsby opened at the Broadway in April 2024.

== Notable productions ==
Productions are listed by the year of their first performance.This list only includes Broadway shows; it does not include films presented at the theater.

=== 1930s to 1990s ===
Notable productions at the theater
| Opening year | Name | Refs. |
|---|---|---|
| 1930 | The New Yorkers | |
| 1932 | Troilus and Cressida | |
| 1932 | Earl Carroll's Vanities | |
| 1940 | Too Many Girls | |
| 1940 | Mamba's Daughters | |
| 1942 | This Is The Army | |
| 1942 | Ballet Imperial, The Fair at Sorochinsk | (Note: These productions were performed in repertory.) |
| 1942 | La Vie Parisienne | |
| 1942 | My Sister Eileen | |
| 1943 | Lady in the Dark | |
| 1943 | The Student Prince | |
| 1943 | Artists and Models (1943) | |
| 1943 | Carmen Jones | |
| 1945 | The Tempest | |
| 1945 | Memphis Bound! | |
| 1945 | Up in Central Park | |
| 1946 | Song of Norway | |
| 1946 | A Flag Is Born | |
| 1946 | Beggar's Holiday | |
| 1948 | The Cradle Will Rock | |
| 1948 | Four productions by the Habimah Players | (Note: Including The Dybbuk, The Golem, Oedipus Rex) |
| 1948 | High Button Shoes | |
| 1949 | Cabalgata | |
| 1949 | As the Girls Go | |
| 1949 | South Pacific | |
| 1950 | Katherine Dunham and Her Company | |
| 1951 | Where's Charley? | |
| 1951 | The Green Pastures | |
| 1951 | Oklahoma! | |
| 1951 | Diamond Lil | |
| 1952 | Kiss Me, Kate | |
| 1952 | Four Saints in Three Acts | |
| 1952 | Shuffle Along (1952) | |
| 1954 | The Saint of Bleecker Street | |
| 1956 | Mr. Wonderful | |
| 1957 | Shinbone Alley | |
| 1957 | The Most Happy Fella | |
| 1958 | The Body Beautiful | |
| 1958 | Three productions by The Old Vic | (Note: Twelfth Night, Hamlet, King Henry V) |
| 1959 | West Side Story | |
| 1959 | Gypsy | |
| 1960 | The Music Man | |
| 1961 | Fiorello! | |
| 1961 | Kean | |
| 1962 | My Fair Lady | |
| 1962 | I Can Get It for You Wholesale | |
| 1963 | Tovarich | |
| 1963 | The Girl Who Came to Supper | |
| 1965 | Baker Street | |
| 1965 | The Devils | |
| 1966 | A Time for Singing | |
| 1966 | Annie Get Your Gun | |
| 1966 | Funny Girl | |
| 1968 | The Happy Time | |
| 1968 | Cabaret | |
| 1969 | Mame | |
| 1970 | Purlie | |
| 1970 | Fiddler on the Roof | |
| 1972 | Dude | |
| 1974 | Candide | |
| 1976 | Guys and Dolls | |
| 1977 | Nana Mouskouri on Broadway | |
| 1977 | The Wiz | |
| 1979 | Evita | |
| 1983 | Zorba | |
| 1984 | The Three Musketeers | |
| 1985 | The King and I | |
| 1986 | Big Deal | |
| 1987 | Les Misérables | |
| 1991 | Miss Saigon | |

=== 2000s to present ===
Notable productions at the theater
| Opening year | Name | Refs. |
|---|---|---|
| 2001 | Blast! | |
| 2002 | Robin Williams: Live on Broadway | |
| 2002 | La Boheme | |
| 2004 | Bombay Dreams | |
| 2005 | The Color Purple | |
| 2008 | Cirque Dreams | |
| 2008 | Shrek The Musical | |
| 2010 | Promises, Promises | |
| 2011 | Sister Act | |
| 2012 | Frankie Valli and the Four Seasons on Broadway | |
| 2013 | Cinderella | |
| 2015 | Doctor Zhivago | |
| 2015 | Fiddler on the Roof | |
| 2017 | Miss Saigon | |
| 2018 | King Kong | |
| 2020 | West Side Story | |
| 2022 | The Little Prince | |
| 2023 | Here Lies Love | |
| 2024 | The Great Gatsby | |

== See also ==
- List of buildings and structures on Broadway in Manhattan
- List of Broadway theaters
