= Hilda Perleno =

American singer

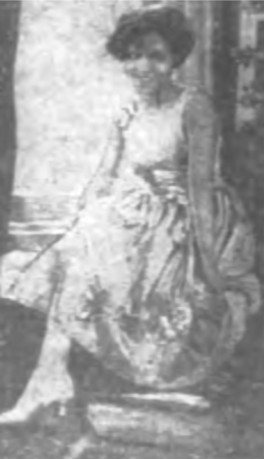
Hilda Perleno, 1926

Hilda Perleno was an American blues and jazz singer, known for her Broadway appearances in the 1920s and 1930s.

== Biography ==
Hilda Eugeana Perleno was a native of East St. Louis, Illinois, and attended the music conservatory at Howard University between 1918 and 1922. Her first role as a performer was as a chorus girl in the 1924 production In Bamville, which was renamed and opened on Broadway in September 1924 as The Chocolate Dandies. In 1925–6, she found work as a first soprano for the Harlem Production Company.

In 1927 she recorded Donald Heywood's "Mango Lane" and "Susanne", singing a duet with Dan Michaels as the composer accompanied them on the piano. In March 1927, she appeared opposite Berlena Banks and Jesse Shipp in the Negro musical comedy Lucky Sambo at the La Salle Theatre in Chicago. Perleno, along with Amanda Randolph, was one of the Three Dixie Songbirds in the production. She had been appearing in the production since 1925. Perleno, along with Blanche Calloway, Anna Freeman, Byron Jones, Lew Keene and Evelyn Keyes performed in the 1928 show Keep Shufflin' by Miller & Lyles at the Erlanger Theater, Chicago. Perleno made regular radio appearances on WCGU in 1928; at times she was joined by Donald Heywood.

In April 1929, Perleno appeared in the ensemble for Messin' Around, and in June, at the Royale Theatre, she had a minor role as Sheila Nesbit in the play Bamboola. Perleno sang in the numbers "Ace of Spades", "Tampico Tune" and "Shoutin Sinners" in the musical.

In 1930, Perleno appeared in Hot Rhythm, and in April 1930 she appeared alongside Margaret Simms, Allen Virgel and Valaida Snow in a production of Shuffle Along in Werba's Brooklyn Theatre. By 1931, Perleno was one of the featured performers for Ed Smalls' Club Paradise Revue. Smalls, the owner of Smalls Paradise, produced regular revues for the club featuring the Smalls' Paradise permanent cast of entertainers. He commissioned original music for the revues, which were performed both at the club and also at local theaters. Jackie "Moms" Mabley was also one of those featured when the revue played at The Harlem Alhambra.

In April 1937, she appeared supporting Ella Fitzgerald and the Chick Webb Orchestra during their one-week engagement at the Apollo Theater in New York City.
