= The Little Prince (musical) =

The Little Prince is a theatrical production based on Antoine de Saint-Exupéry’s 1943 story The Little Prince that features dance, circus arts, video production and acrobatics. Tournié and Mouron began adapting the show for the stage in 2018. The show is directed and choreographed by Anne Tournié and ran in Paris, Dubai and Sydney before arriving on Broadway in spring 2022. The Sydney engagement marked the city's first major international production since the COVID-19 lockdown.

Cast included Lionel Zalachas as the Little Prince, co-director Chris Mouron as The Narrator, Aurélien Bednarek as The Aviator together with a large ensemble cast. The Broadway production was slated to run from March through August at the Broadway Theatre but on April 26, it announced it would close on May 8 after receiving poor reviews.
