= Shuffle Along =

All-Black hit Broadway show, 1920s and '30s

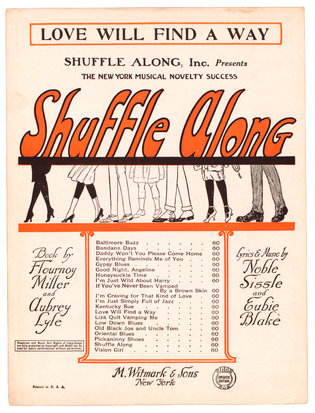
- Sheet music for "Love Will Find a Way", a song from the show
- Music: Eubie Blake
- Lyrics: Noble Sissle
- Book: F. E. Miller; Aubrey Lyles
- Productions: 1921 Broadway; 1933 Broadway sequel 1952 Broadway sequel 2016 Broadway adaptation

Shuffle Along is a musical composed by Eubie Blake, with lyrics by Noble Sissle and a book written by the comedy duo Flournoy Miller and Aubrey Lyles. One of the most popular all-Black hit Broadway shows, it was a landmark in African-American musical theater, credited with inspiring the Harlem Renaissance of the 1920s and '30s.

The show premiered at the 63rd Street Music Hall in 1921, running for 504 performances, a remarkably successful span for that decade. It launched the careers of Josephine Baker, Adelaide Hall, Florence Mills, Fredi Washington and Paul Robeson, and was so popular it caused "curtain time traffic jams" on West 63rd Street.

A 2016 adaptation, Shuffle Along, or, the Making of the Musical Sensation of 1921 and All That Followed, focused on the challenges of mounting the original production as well as its lasting effects on Broadway and race relations.

== Background ==
The show's four writers were African-American Vaudeville veterans who first met in 1920 at an NAACP benefit held at the newly opened Dunbar Theatre in Philadelphia. None had ever written a musical, or even appeared on Broadway. Promoters were skeptical that a black-written and produced show would appeal to Broadway audiences. After finding a small source of funding, Shuffle Along toured New Jersey and Pennsylvania. However, with its limited budget, it was difficult to meet travel and production expenses. Cast members were rarely paid, and were "trapped out of town when the box-office receipts could not cover train fare". The budget was so low that cast members had to wear damaged and worn leftover costumes from other shows. For some time, the entire set could fit in one taxicab, and was transported between theaters by that means (Krasner 244). When the show returned to New York about a year later, during the recession of 1920–1921, the production owed $18,000 and faced strong competition on Broadway in a season that included Florenz Ziegfeld's Sally and a new edition of George White's Scandals. It was able to book only a remote theater on West 63rd Street with no orchestra pit. In the end, however, the show earned $9 million from its original Broadway production and three touring companies, an unusual sum in its time.

"I'm Just Wild About Harry"
Instrumental version of "I'm Just Wild About Harry" recorded on May 17, 1922. Duration 3:54.

Miller and Lyles wrote thin, jokey dialogue scenes to connect the songs: "The plot of ... Shuffle Along was mainly to allow an excuse for the singing and dancing." Miller and Lyles also wore blackface in Shuffle Along. In the 21st century, this may seem unfathomable and offensive; however, the "audiences understood" the "makeup" only "suggested a portrayal of broad comedic characters". The use of blackface was simply a starting point, not the finish line. Miller and Lyles used the context they were given to captivate and appeal to audiences; however, they maintained their voices rather than resorting to typically exaggerated blackface characterizations. For instance, "rather than entirely embrace the lingering vestiges of minstrelsy” the duo "found ways to alter the formula". Their act initially appeared to imitate traditional minstrelsy; however, the characters they created were clever, complex, and defied traditional stereotypes.

The plot of Shuffle Along was based on Miller's and Lyles's previous play, The Mayor of Dixie (Bordman 624), and in Shuffle Along, they incorporated "their well-beloved characters that they had been playing for years in vaudeville". Breaking with minstrel tradition, the principal characters wore tuxedos, conveying their dignity. In minstrel shows, characters in tuxedos and blackface typically played the “Zip Coon” type, a stock character which mocked black people who were free from slavery (Harold 75). Shuffle Along rejected this image by presenting its characters as community-oriented men seeking to run for mayor of their city. Furthermore, Miller believed "that the only way to put Negro performers into white theatres with any kind of dignity was through musical comedy".

The musical drew repeat audiences due to its jazzy music styles, a modern, edgy contrast to the mainstream song-and-dance styles audiences had seen on Broadway for two decades. The show's dancing and 16-girl chorus line were more reasons why the show was so successful. According to Time magazine, Shuffle Along was the first Broadway musical that prominently featured syncopated jazz music, and the first to feature a chorus of professional female dancers. It introduced musical hits such as "I'm Just Wild about Harry"; "Love Will Find a Way", the first African American romantic musical duet on a Broadway stage; and "In Honeysuckle Time". It launched or boosted the careers of Josephine Baker, Paul Robeson, Florence Mills, Fredi Washington and Adelaide Hall, and contributed to the desegregation of theaters in the 1920s, giving many black actors their first chance to appear on Broadway. Once it left New York, the show toured for three years and was, according to Barbara Glass, the first black musical to play in white theaters across the United States. Its appeal to audiences of all races, and to celebrities such as George Gershwin, Fanny Brice, Al Jolson, Langston Hughes and critic George Jean Nathan, helped unite the white Broadway and black jazz communities and improve race relations in America.

Composer and lyricist duo Noble Sissle and Eubie Blake created the revolutionary music of Shuffle Along. They incorporated music and visual spectacle with the preexisting narrative to create a unique show. While stereotypes were indeed present, Sissle and Blake worked "within a parallel performance form" replacing "the negative stereotypes… with a vastly more positive image." The musical score was also used to create an exceptional show. Eubie Blake's score was a way to demonstrate his "command of every important genre of contemporary commercial" music without disguising "his individuality or race." His genius used classical musical styles to complement the uniqueness of African-American music, creating a distinctly novel sound. In addition to presenting refined subject matter, the music of Shuffle Along expressed the African-American masteries of music and performance.

== Plot ==
Two dishonest partners in a grocery store, Sam Peck and Steve Jenkins, both run for mayor in Jimtown, USA. They agree that if either wins, he will appoint the other his chief of police. Steve wins with the help of a crooked campaign manager. He keeps his promise and appoints Sam chief of police, but they begin to disagree on petty matters. They resolve their differences in a long, comic fight. As they fight, their opponent for the mayoral position, virtuous Harry Walton, vows to end their corrupt regime ("I'm Just Wild about Harry"). Harry gets the people behind him and wins the next election, as well as the lovely Jessie, and runs Sam and Steve out of town

== Songs ==
Act I

- "Election Day" - Chorus
- "I'm Simply Full of Jazz" - Ruth Little and Syncopation Steppers
- "Love Will Find a Way" - Jessie Williams and Harry Walton
- "Bandana Days" - Alderman and Company
- "Sing Me to Sleep, Dear Mammy" - Harry Walton and Board of Aldermen
- "(In) Honeysuckle Time (When Emmaline Said She'd Be Mine)" - Tom Sharper
- "Gypsy Blues" - Jessie Williams, Ruth Little and Harry Walton

Act II

- "Shuffle Along" - Jimtown Pedestrians and Traffic Cop
- "I'm Just Wild About Harry" - Jessie Williams and Jimtown Sunflowers
- "Syncopation Stenos" - Mayor's Staff
- "Good Night Angeline" - Board of Aldermen
- "If You Haven't Been Vamped by a Brownskin, You Haven't Been Vamped at All" - Steve Jenkins, Sam Peck and Jimtown Vamps
- "Uncle Tom and Old Black Joe" - Uncle Tom and Old Black Joe
- "Everything Reminds Me of You" - Jessie Williams and Harry Walton
- "Oriental Blues" - Tom Sharper and Oriental Girls
- "I Am Craving for That Kind of Love"/ "Daddy (Won't You Please Come Home)" - Ruth Little
- "Baltimore Buzz" - Tom Sharper and Jimtown's Jazz Steppers
- "African Dip" - Steve Jenkins and Sam Peck

== Original production ==
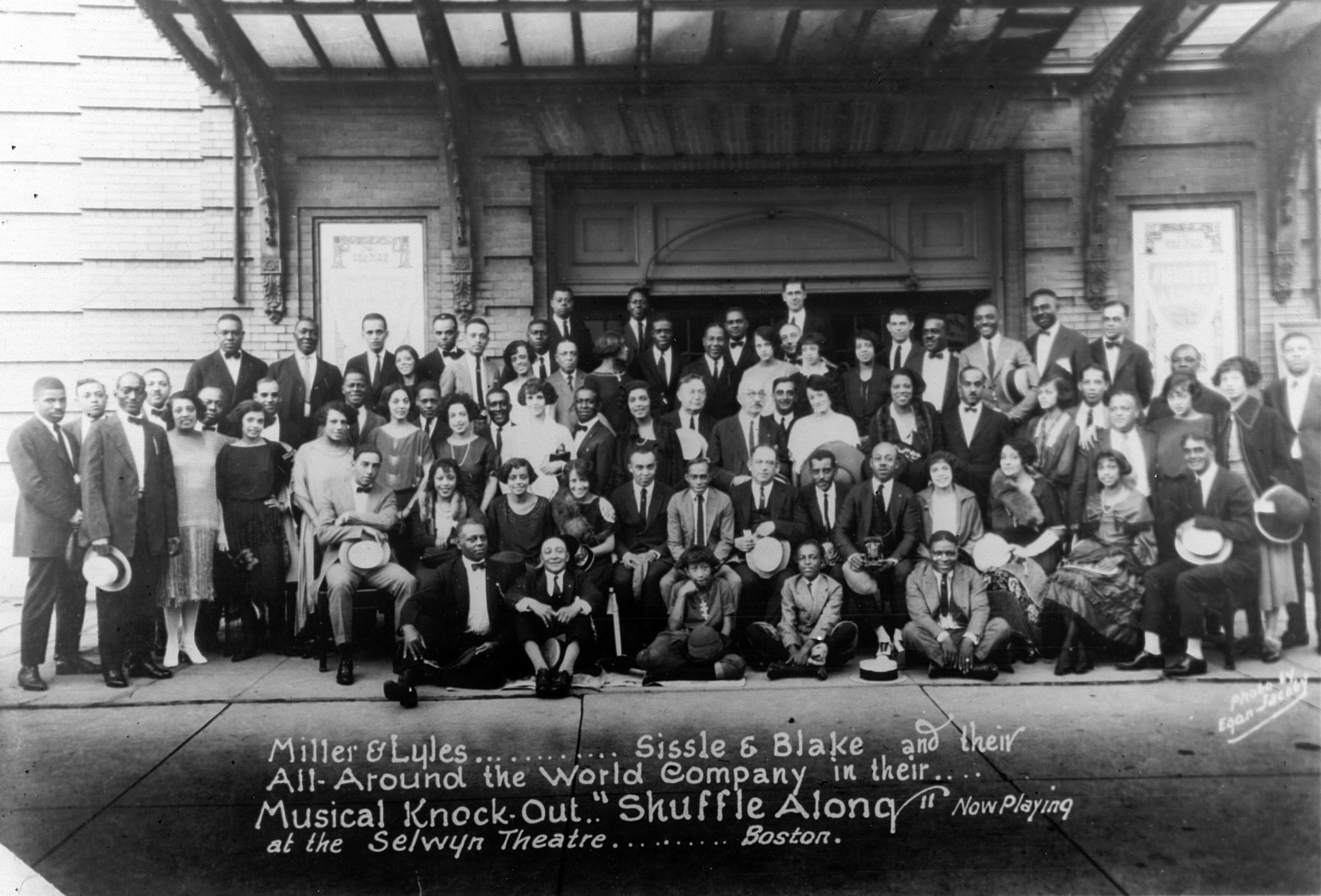
Photo of the cast and crew, early 1920s

The show premiered on Broadway at the 63rd Street Music Hall on May 23, 1921, and closed on July 15, 1922, after 504 performances. Directed by Walter Brooks, with Eubie Blake playing the piano, the cast included Lottie Gee as Jessie Williams, Adelaide Hall as Jazz Jasmine, Gertrude Saunders as Ruth Little, Roger Matthews as Harry Walton, and Noble Sissle as Tom Sharper. Saunders was later replaced by Florence Mills. Josephine Baker, who was deemed too young at the age of 15 to be in the show, joined the touring company in Boston, and then joined the Broadway cast when she turned 16. Bessie Allison's first professional performance was in Shuffle Along. The orchestra included William Grant Still and Hall Johnson. The musical toured successfully throughout the country up to 1924.

The show was made up of an entirely African American cast and creative team and ran for, “504 performances, generated multiple traveling companies, and sparked the careers of several acclaimed performers” such as Florence Mills and Josephine Baker.

== Historical effect and response ==
The show was "the first major production in more than a decade to be produced, written and performed entirely by African Americans." According to the Harlem chronicler James Weldon Johnson, Shuffle Along marked a breakthrough for the African-American musical performer and "legitimized the African-American musical, proving to producers and managers that audiences would pay to see African-American talent on Broadway." Black audiences at Shuffle Along sat in orchestra seats rather than being relegated to the balcony. It was the first Broadway musical to feature a sophisticated African-American love story, rather than a frivolous comic one.

According to theatre historian John Kenrick, "Judged by contemporary standards, much of Shuffle Along would seem offensive ... most of the comedy relied on old minstrel show stereotypes. Each of the leading male characters was out to swindle the other." Nevertheless, the African-American community embraced the show, and performers recognized the importance of the show's success to their careers. "Shuffle Along was one of the first shows to provide the right mixture of primitivism and satire, enticement and respectability, blackface humor and romance, to satisfy its customers".

After Shuffle Along, nine African-American musicals opened on Broadway between 1921 and 1924. In 1928, Lew Leslie's Blackbirds of 1928, starring Adelaide Hall and Bill "Bojangles" Robinson, became the longest running all-black show on Broadway (up to that point), running for 518 performances. In 1929, Harlem, a drama by Wallace Thurman and William Rapp, introduced the Slow Drag, the first African-American social dance to reach Broadway. However, the success of the show set limits on the black-themed shows that followed. "Any show that followed the characteristics of Shuffle Along could usually be assured of favorable reviews or at least a modest audience response. Yet, if a show strayed from what had become the standard formula for the black musical, disastrous reviews became almost inevitable. ... The result of this critical stranglehold on the black musical was that ... black authors and composers prepared shows within extremely narrow constraints." Nevertheless, scholar James Haskins stated that Shuffle Along "started a whole new era for blacks on Broadway, as well as a whole new era for blacks in all creative fields." Loften Mitchell, author of Black Drama: The Story of the American Negro in the Theatre, credited Shuffle Along with launching the Harlem Renaissance, as did Langston Hughes.

President Harry Truman chose the show's song "I'm Just Wild About Harry" for his campaign anthem.

The story in Shuffle Along also presented a romance between two Black characters that was presented as equal to that of a white romance in other Broadway shows. "Negroes had never been permitted romance before on the stage" and there was real fear that people would respond harshly (Blake 152). The song "Love Will Find A Way” portrayed the love between these two characters and was well received by audiences despite the initial concerns. This was a huge step in Black entertainment, that “song was really the first of its kind" but was widely accepted (Blake 152). Shuffle Along was able to break away from the status quo for Black stage productions of its time.

Previous Black drama that was popular in America during the early 1900s had impacts on most African American shows. Many Negro stereotypes had been developed by white directors that had "parodied from carefully selected aspects of real African American Life" (Hay 16). These stereotypes were enjoyed by white audiences and became expected when going to a show with an African American character. This mix of "reality and make-believe was that in each case the latter quality reinforced the former" creating absurdly comedic black characters and situations (Hay 17). Shuffle Along was not immune to these influences. At the end of the show the community apprehends the two corrupt political candidates who were stealing from their own grocery to fund their campaign against each other throughout the story. Unfortunately, "the tomfoolery overshadows the election of a reform candidate" and the audience forgets the “theme of crime does not pay” (Hay 20).

== Subsequent productions ==
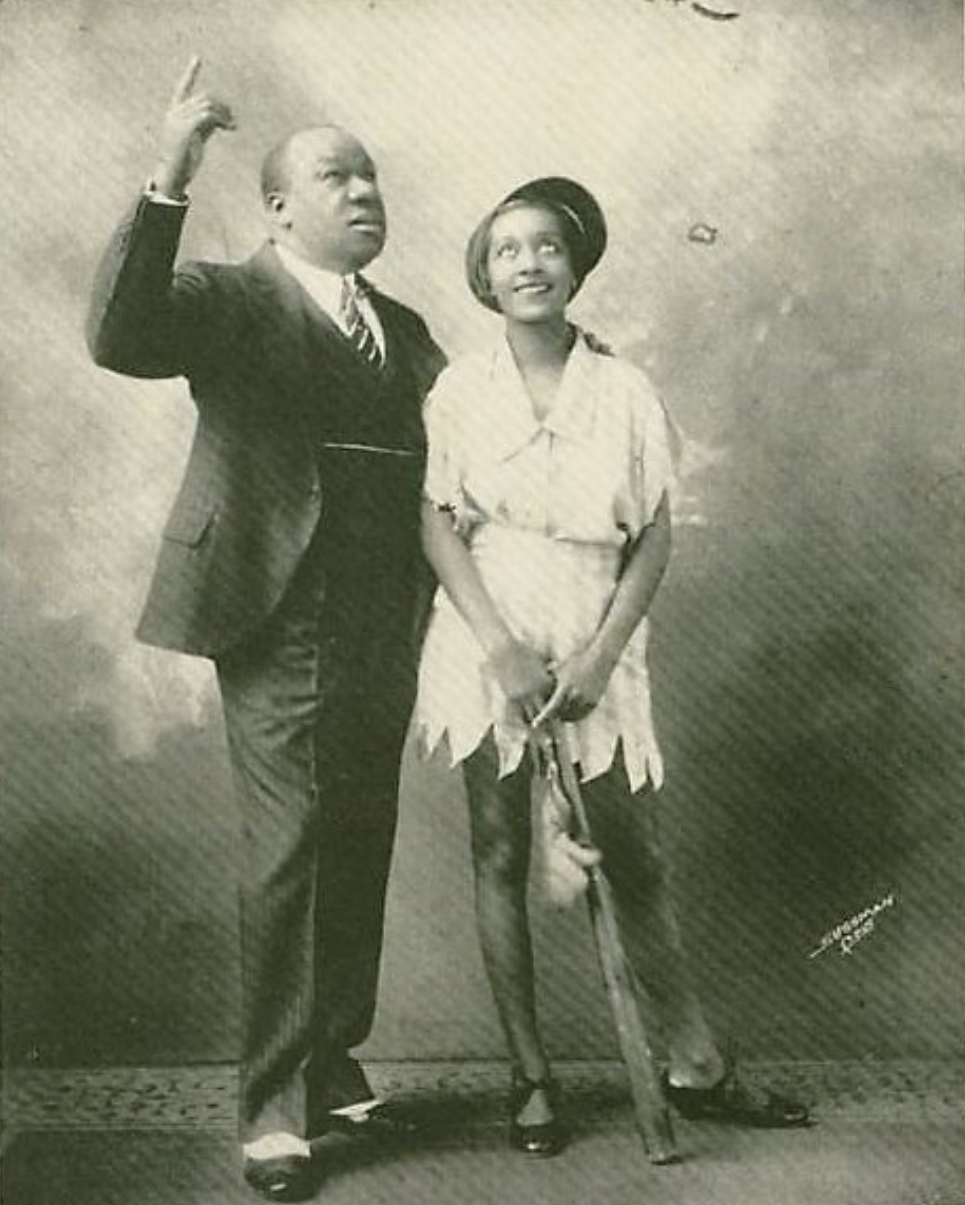
Broadway Jones (left) in a 1928 press photo for Shuffle Along Jr.

In 1927 Blake and Sissle's partnership came to end when Sissle left for Europe, and Blake re-formed a collaboration with his old partner Broadway Jones at that time. Together, Blake and Jones crafted a distilled version of Shuffle Along entitled Shuffle Along Jr. which began touring in vaudeville's Orpheum Circuit in 1928. Several of the chorus members from the original Broadway cast were in this tour. In addition to Blake and Jones, principle performers included singer and dancer Katie Crippen and her partner Dewey Brown; jazz vocalist Hilda Perleno; and the nightclub performer and band leader Mae Diggs.

Two Broadway revivals were staged, unsuccessfully, in 1933 and 1952, with the latter including additional music by Joseph Meyer.

At the Mansfield Theatre, from December 26, 1932, to January 7, 1933, starring Sissle, Blake, Miller, Mantan Moreland, and Bill Bailey: the production closed after 17 performances. Despite its quick closure in New York City, the revival began touring, including a young Nat King Cole in the cast, eventually ending in Los Angeles in 1937.

During World War II, Sissle and Blake adapted and performed Shuffle Along for USO shows, with an ensemble that included pianist and vibraphonist Sylvester Lewis.

After opening at the Broadway Theatre on May 8, 1952, Shuffle Along closed after four performances. Starring Sissle, Blake, Avon Long, and Thelma Carpenter, and choreographed by Henry LeTang, this incarnation was recorded in an abridged form by RCA Victor, combined with selections from Blackbirds of 1928.

== Adaptations ==
An excerpt of Shuffle Along, the musical fight between the two leading characters, was made into a short talkie film by Warner Bros. in the late 1920s. This footage was discovered in the studio's archives in 2010, along with another similar short featuring Miller and Lyles. The two shorts, "The Mayor of Jimtown" (1928) and "Jimtown Cabaret" (1929), had been previously misfiled.

The 1978 musical review Eubie! repurposed over a dozen songs from Shuffle Along.

A 2016 stage adaptation Shuffle Along, or, the Making of the Musical Sensation of 1921 and All That Followed featured the original music from Shuffle Along and other songs by its creators, with a book written by George C. Wolfe based on the original by Miller and Lyles and historical events. The show focuses on the challenges of mounting the 1921 Broadway production of Shuffle Along, its success and aftermath, including its effect on Broadway and race relations. The production opened on Broadway in April 2016 at the Music Box Theatre, directed by Wolfe, and choreographed by Savion Glover. The cast starred Audra McDonald as Lottie Gee, Brian Stokes Mitchell as Miller, Billy Porter as Lyles, Brandon Victor Dixon as Blake and Joshua Henry as Sissle. While the adaptation received ten nominations at the 2016 Tony Awards, the production took home no prize, and subsequently closed on July 24.

== Sources ==
- Bordman, Gerald, and Thomas S. Hischak. The Oxford Companion to American Theatre. Oxford University Press, 2011.
- Gaines, Caseen (2021). Footnotes: the Black artists who rewrote the rules of the Great White Way. Naperville: Sourcebooks. ISBN 9781492688815
- Glass, Barbara S. (2012). African American Dance, an Illustrated History, MacFarland & Company, Inc., Jefferson, North Carolina, and London. ISBN 978-0-7864-7157-7
- Haskins, James (2002). Black Stars of the Harlem Renaissance. John Wiley and Sons. ISBN 0-471-21152-4
- Hill, Errol (1987). The Theater of Black Americans. Hal Leonard Corporation. ISBN 0-936839-27-9
- Carney Smith, Jessie, ed. (1996). Notable Black American Women. Detroit, Michigan: Gale Research Inc. ISBN 0-8103-9177-5.
- Harold, Claudrena N. (2018). New Negro Politics in the Jim Crow South. University of Georgia Press.
- Krasner, David (2004). A Beautiful Pageant: African American Theater, Drama, and Performance in the Harlem Renaissance, 1910-1927. Palgrave Macmillan.
- Williams, Iain Cameron (2003). Underneath a Harlem Moon: The Harlem to Paris Years of Adelaide Hall, Continuum. ISBN 0826458939
- Wintz, Cary D., ed. (2007). Harlem Speaks: A Living History of the Harlem Renaissance, Naperville: Sourcebooks. ISBN 978-1-4022-0436-4
