= Opal Cooper =

African American actor and singer (1889–1974)

Opal D. Cooper (1889 – 1974) was an African American musician and performer. Though little remembered today, in the years immediately after World War I, Cooper "was a singer, pianist and actor who experienced marginal success in the United States and parts of Europe during the 1920s and 1930s."

== Early life and career ==
Opal Cooper was born to Louis and Ellen Cooper in Cromwell, Kentucky on February 3rd, 1881. His family moved to Chicago, Illinois, and by the time he was in his late teen years, Opal became a professional tenor soloist. He performed in many concerts and recitals, his first appearance being in the musical comedy called Darkydom in 1915. Cooper continued to make a name for himself as he was in other plays and concerts, where critics described him as "large" and "robust". He would also enlist into the US Army where he served as a drum major for 807 Pioneer International Band during World War I. He eventually rose to the ranking of a sergeant, and after he was discharged in 1919, he resided in Europe where he joined the American Legion in Paris.

== Later Life ==
Cooper travelled and performed throughout Europe, and he also visited India. Because of the lack of work due to World War II, Cooper returned to the US where he resided in and played at clubs in New York. Opal Cooper played with many different bands across his career, including James Reese Europe's Octette of Singers and Players, Five Red Devils (in which he played with Sam Richardson, Creighton Thompson, and Sidney Bechet), Seth Weeks Jazz Band, and the International Four, as well as a band with both DeKoven Thompson and Creighton Thompson, two of his cast mates from Darkydom. In 1949, Cooper married Cora Outten, and they moved to the Bronx in the late 1960s. To support him and his wife, Cooper became a taxi driver, which was his occupation until he died in 1974.

Personal and professional papers relating to him are held in the Opal Cooper collection at the Schomburg Center for Research in Black Culture, New York Public Library.
