= Eubie Blake =

American jazz pianist (1887–1983)

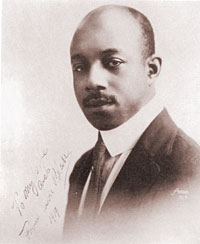

Background information
- Born: James Hubert Blake; February 7, 1887; Baltimore, Maryland, U.S.
- Died: February 12, 1983 (aged 96) New York City, U.S.
- Genres: Jazz, popular, ragtime
- Occupations: Composer, musician
- Instrument: Piano
- Labels: Emerson, Victor, Columbia

James Hubert "Eubie" Blake (February 7, 1887 – February 12, 1983) was an American pianist and composer of ragtime, jazz, and popular music. Blake began his career in 1912, and during World War I he worked in partnership with the singer, drummer, and comedian Broadway Jones. After the war he began a collaboration with Noble Sissle with whom he wrote Shuffle Along (1921), one of the first Broadway musicals written and directed by African Americans. When his collaboration with Sissle ended in 1927, he resumed a partnership with Jones which lasted until either 1932 or 1933. He reunited with Sissle briefly for Shuffle Along of 1933, and later the pair worked together in the United Service Organizations during World War II. Blake's compositions included such hits as "Bandana Days", "Charleston Rag", "Love Will Find a Way", "Memories of You" and "I'm Just Wild About Harry". The 1978 Broadway musical Eubie! showcased his works, and in 1981, President Ronald Reagan awarded Blake the Presidential Medal of Freedom.

== Early years ==
James Hubert Blake was born on February 7, 1887, at 319 Forrest Street in Baltimore, Maryland, to Emily "Emma" Johnstone and John Sumner Blake, who worked as a stevedore on the Baltimore Docks. Both of his parents were previously enslaved, and he was the only one of their children to survive childhood.

Blake claimed in later life to have been born in 1883, but records published beginning in 2003—U.S. Census, military, and Social Security records and Blake's passport application and passport—uniformly give his birth year as 1887.

== Music ==
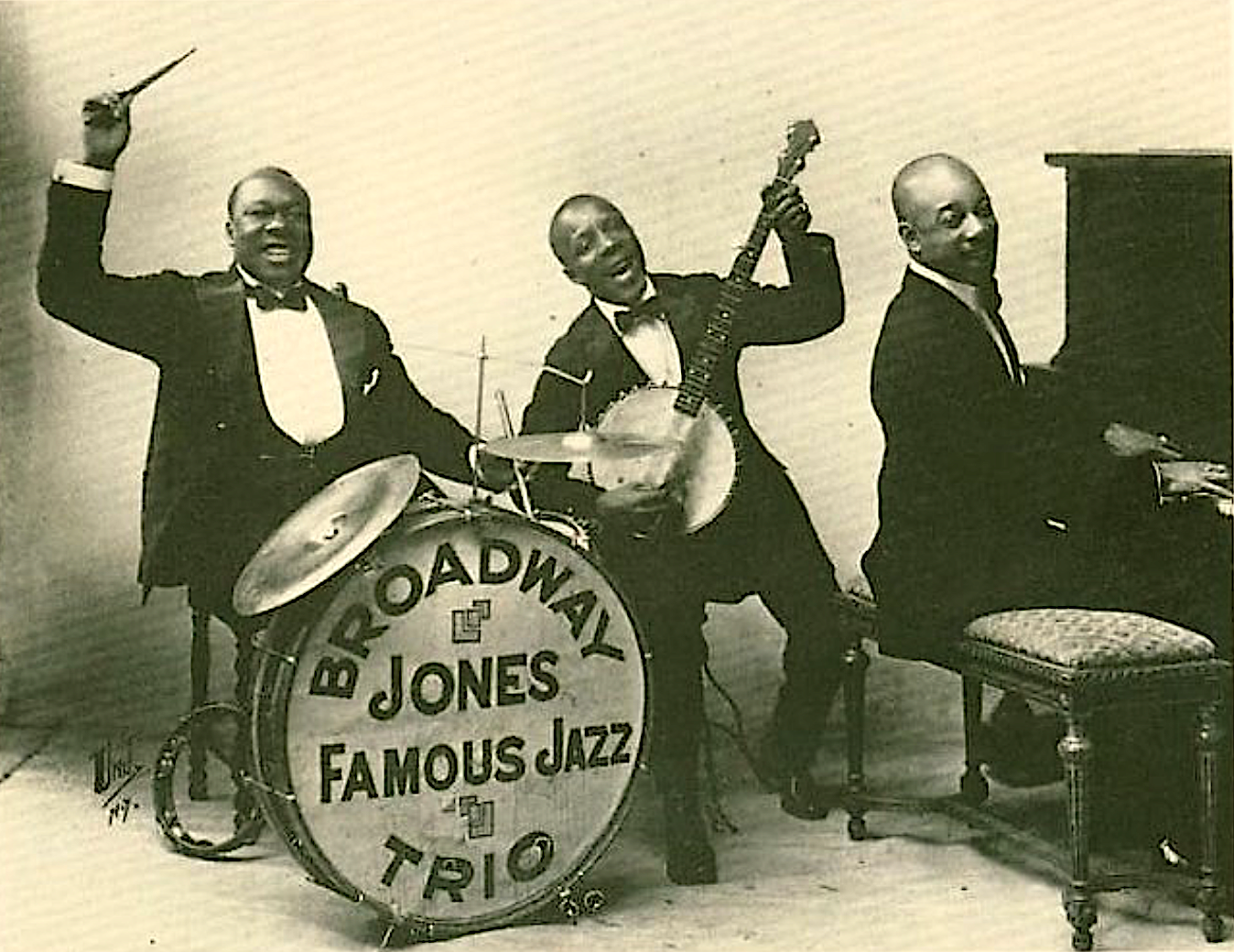
Broadway Jones Trio c. 1918: Broadway Jones on drums, Jessie Wilson on banjo and Blake on piano

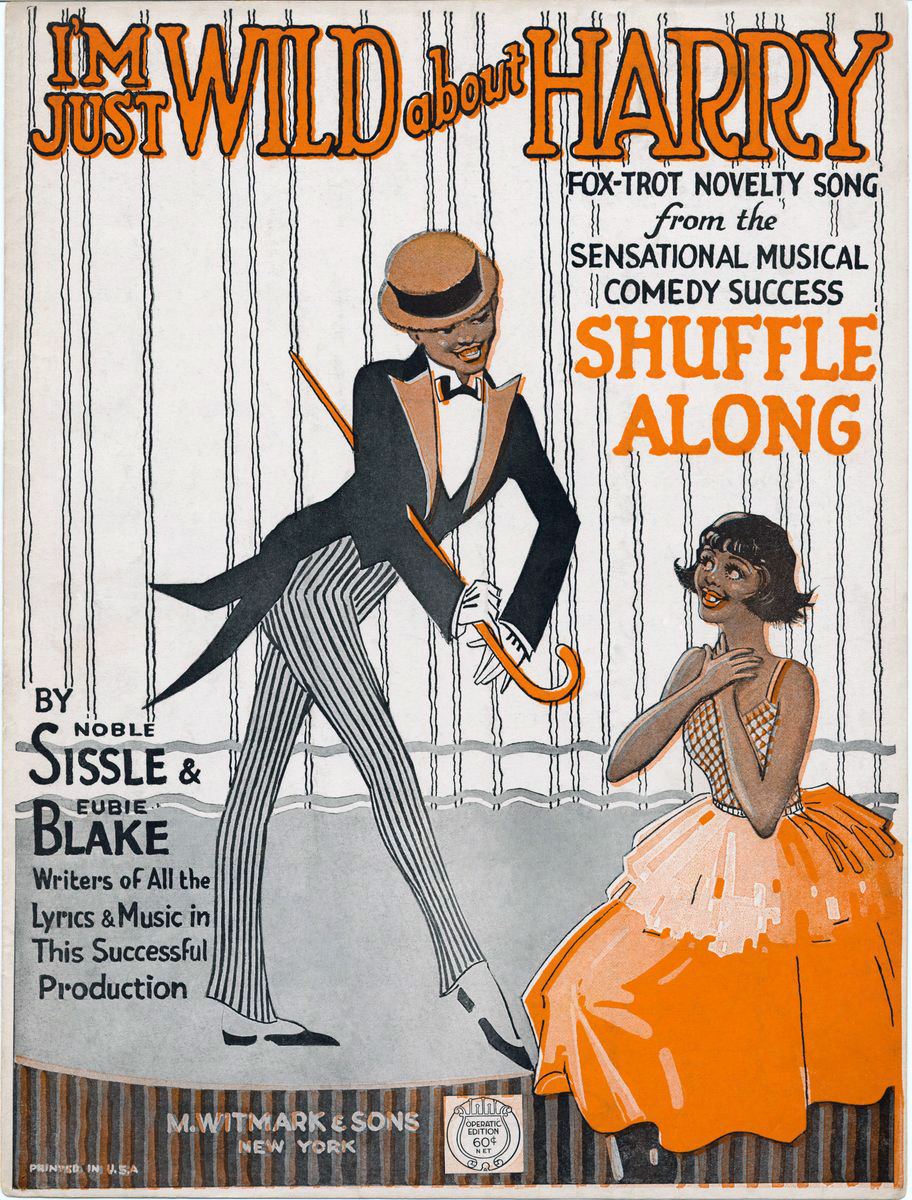
Sheet music for "I'm Just Wild About Harry", from Shuffle Along, by Blake and Noble Sissle, 1921

Blake's musical training began when he was four or five. While out shopping with his mother, he wandered into a music store, climbed onto the bench of an organ, and started "foolin' around". When his mother found him, the store manager told her: "The child is a genius! It would be criminal to deprive him of the chance to make use of such a sublime, God-given talent." The Blakes purchased a pump organ for US$75.00, making payments of 25 cents a week. When Blake was seven, he received music lessons from a neighbor, Margaret Marshall, an organist for the Methodist church. At age 15, without his parents' knowledge, he began playing piano at Aggie Shelton's Baltimore bordello. Blake gained his first big break in the music business in 1907, when world champion boxer Joe Gans hired him to play the piano at Gans's Goldfield Hotel, the first "black and tan club" in Baltimore. Blake played at the Goldfield during the winters from 1907 to 1914, and spent his summers playing clubs in Atlantic City. During this period, he also studied composition in Baltimore with Llewellyn Wilson.

According to Blake, he also worked the medicine show circuit and was employed by a Quaker doctor. He played a melodeon strapped to the back of the medicine wagon. He stayed with the show only two weeks, however, because the doctor's religion did not allow the serving of Sunday dinner.

Blake said he composed the melody of "Charleston Rag" in 1899, when he would have been only 12 years old. He did not commit it to paper until 1915, when he learned musical notation.

In 1912, Blake began playing in vaudeville with James Reese Europe's Society Orchestra, which accompanied Vernon and Irene Castle's ballroom dance act. The band played ragtime music, which was still quite popular. He made his first recordings in 1917, for the Pathé record label and for Ampico piano rolls. In the 1920s he recorded for the Victor and Emerson labels, among others. His 1917 Pathé records billed as the Eubie Blake Trio possibly were made with Broadway Jones as the drummer. Jones, who was primarily a vocalist and comedian but had a background as the leader of a dance band, was Blake's performing partner during World War I. After having already formed a music partnership, the duo created a vaudeville music and comedy act which they toured in 1918. Blake later became a regular performer at a Harlem nightclub owned by Jones in 1923–1924.

Shortly after World War I, Blake ceased his partnership with Jones and formed a vaudeville musical act, the Dixie Duo, with performer Noble Sissle. After vaudeville, they began work on a musical revue, Shuffle Along, which incorporated songs they had written, and had a book written by F. E. Miller and Aubrey Lyles. When it premiered in June 1921, Shuffle Along became the first hit musical on Broadway written by and about African Americans. It also introduced hit songs such as "I'm Just Wild About Harry" and "Love Will Find a Way". Rudolf Fisher insisted that Shuffle Along "had ruined his favorite places of African-American sociability in Harlem" due to the influx of white patrons. Its reliance on "stereotypical black stage humor" and "the primitivist conventions of cabaret," in the words of Thomas Brothers, made the show a hit, running for 504 performances with three years of national tours.

In 1923, Blake made three films for Lee de Forest in de Forest's Phonofilm sound-on-film process: Noble Sissle and Eubie Blake, featuring their song "Affectionate Dan"; Sissle and Blake Sing Snappy Songs, featuring "Sons of Old Black Joe" and "My Swanee Home"; and Eubie Blake Plays His Fantasy on Swanee River, featuring Blake performing his "Fantasy on Swanee River". These films are preserved in the Maurice Zouary film collection in the Library of Congress collection. Blake also appeared in Warner Brothers' 1932 short film Pie, Pie Blackbird with the Nicholas Brothers, Nina Mae McKinney and Noble Sissle. That year, he and his orchestra also provided most of the music for the film Harlem Is Heaven.

In 1927 Blake's partnership with Noble Sissle came to an end when Sissle relocated to Europe. He resumed a collaboration with Broadway Jones beginning with performances at Loew's State Theatre in November 1927. Blake then joined Jones for an extended engagement at the Royal Poinciana Hotel in Palm Beach, Florida where Jones had often performed since 1915. The pair then formed their own theatre troupe, and toured a new show in vaudeville's Orpheum Circuit called Shuffle Along Jr. after the earlier musical with some of the same performers from the earlier work. The duo then performed together in numerous musical revues in the early 1930s; including touring ones led by Fanchon and Marco and the Broadway musical revue Blackbirds of 1930. Blake also played in a band founded by Jones until either 1932 or 1933 when financial pressures during the Great Depression led Jones to end the collaboration. The pair later reunited briefly in the mid 1930s for performances with the Monarch Symphonic Band in Harlem.

In 1932 Blake resumed working with Sissle for a brief period as the authors and stars of the musical revue Shuffle Along of 1933. It failed to make a profit during the hard times of the depression. They would not work together again until World War II when they reunited to work together in the United Service Organizations. Their earlier 1921 song "I'm Just Wild About Harry" became the theme song for Harry S. Truman during his campaign leading up to the 1948 United States presidential election.

== Later life ==
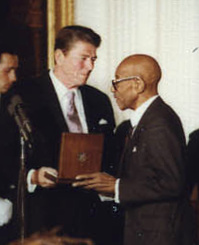
Blake receiving the Presidential Medal of Freedom from Ronald Reagan (1981)

In July 1910, Blake married Avis Elizabeth Cecelia Lee, proposing to her in a chauffeur-driven car he hired. They met around 1895, when they attended Primary School No. 2 at 200 East Street in Baltimore. In 1910, Blake brought his bride to Atlantic City, New Jersey, where he had already found employment at the Boathouse nightclub.

In 1938, Avis was diagnosed with tuberculosis. She died later that year, at the age of 58. Of his loss, Blake said, "In my life I never knew what it was to be alone. At first when Avis got sick, I thought she just had a cold, but when time passed and she didn't get better, I made her go to a doctor and we found out she had TB ... I suppose I knew from when we found out she had the TB, I understood that it was just a matter of time."

While serving as bandleader with the USO during World War II, he met Marion Grant Tyler, the widow of violinist Willy Tyler. They married in 1945. A performer and businesswoman, she became his valued business manager until her death in 1982. In 1946, Blake retired from performing and enrolled in New York University, where he studied the Schillinger System of music composition, graduating in two and a half years. He spent the next two decades using the Schillinger System to transcribe songs that he had memorized but had never written down.

In the 1970s and 1980s, public interest in Blake's music was revived following the release of his 1969 retrospective album The Eighty-Six Years of Eubie Blake.

Blake was a frequent guest of The Tonight Show Starring Johnny Carson and Merv Griffin. He was featured by leading conductors, such as Leonard Bernstein and Arthur Fiedler. In 1977 he played Will Williams in the Jeremy Kagan biographical film Scott Joplin. By 1975, he had been awarded honorary doctorates from Rutgers, the New England Conservatory, the University of Maryland, Morgan State University, Pratt Institute, Brooklyn College, and Dartmouth. On October 9, 1981, he received the Presidential Medal of Freedom from President Ronald Reagan.

Eubie!, a revue featuring Blake's music, with lyrics by Noble Sissle, Andy Razaf, Johnny Brandon, F. E. Miller and Jim Europe, opened on Broadway in 1978. It was a hit at the Ambassador Theatre, where it ran for 439 performances. It received three nominations for Tony Awards, including one for Blake's score. The show was filmed in 1981 with the original cast members, including Lesley Dockery, Gregory Hines and Maurice Hines.

Blake performed with Gregory Hines on the television program Saturday Night Live on March 10, 1979 (season 4, episode 14).

== Death ==
Blake continued to play and record until his death, on February 12, 1983, in Brooklyn, five days after events celebrating his purported 100th birthday (which was actually his 96th birthday).

He was interred in Cypress Hills Cemetery in Queens. His headstone, engraved with the musical notation of "I'm Just Wild About Harry", was commissioned by the African Atlantic Genealogical Society.

Blake was reported to have said, on his birthday in 1979, "If I'd known I was going to live this long, I would have taken better care of myself", but this has been attributed to others and has appeared in print at least as early as 1966.

== Honors and awards ==
- 1969: Nomination for a Grammy Award for The Eighty-Six Years of Eubie Blake in the category of "Best Instrumental Jazz Performance, Small Group or Soloist with Small Group"
- 1974: Doctor of Fine Arts, Rutgers University
- 1978: Doctor of Fine Arts, University of Maryland
- 1980: George Peabody Medal, Johns Hopkins University
- 1981: Presidential Medal of Freedom, October 9, 1981, awarded by President Ronald Reagan
- 1982: Doctor of Music, Howard University
- 1984: A joint resolution designating February 7, 1984, as "Eubie Blake Day" was introduced in the U.S. Congress
- 1995: United States Postal Service stamp issued in his honor
- 1995: Induction into the American Theatre Hall of Fame, New York City
- 1998: James Hubert Blake High School in Cloverly, Maryland
- 2006: The album The Eighty-Six Years of Eubie Blake (1969) was included by the National Recording Preservation Board in the Library of Congress' National Recording Registry. The board annually selects songs that are "culturally, historically, or aesthetically significant."

== Selected discography ==
"I'm Just Wild About Harry"
Instrumental version of "I'm Just Wild About Harry" recorded May 17, 1922. Duration 3:54

- Victor Orchestra – Chevy Chase Fox Trot (1914), Victor
- Victor Military Band – Bugle Call Rag (1916), Victor
- Eubie Blake and His Shuffle Along Orchestra – Bandana Days (1921), Victor
- Paul Whiteman Orchestra – I'm Just Wild About Harry (1922), Victor
- Bert Lown and the Hotel Biltmore Orchestra – Loving You the Way I Do (1930), Victor
- Duke Ellington, Dick Robertson, and the Cotton Club Orchestra – Memories of You (1930), Victor
- Louis Armstrong and the Cotton Club Orchestra – You're Lucky to Me (1930), Okeh
- Eubie Blake – The Eighty Six Years of Eubie Blake (1969), Columbia

== See also ==
- African American musical theater
- Black and tan clubs
- Age fabrication
- Black and Blue (musical)
- List of ragtime composers
