= 1933 in music =

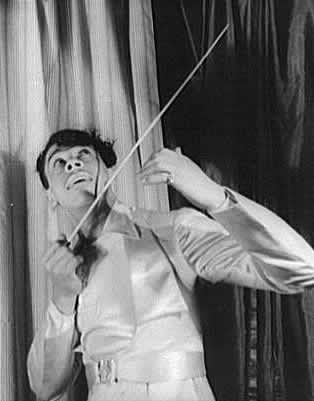
Swing band leader Cab Calloway in 1933

This is a list of notable events in music that took place in the year 1933.

== Specific locations ==
- 1933 in British music
- 1933 in Norwegian music

1933 USA pop songs

== Specific genres ==
- 1933 in country music
- 1933 in jazz

== Events ==
- January 23 – Béla Bartók's Piano Concerto No. 2 receives its première in Frankfurt.
- February – Billie Holiday is "discovered" singing at Monette's club in Harlem.
- March 6 – Nicolas Slonimsky conducts the world première of Edgard Varèse's Ionisation at Carnegie Hall in New York City.
- June – No. 1 Rhythm Club, a pioneering jazz club, opens in Regent Street, London.
- June 12 – Florence Price's Symphony In E Minor is premièred by the Chicago Symphony Orchestra, the first composition by an African American woman to be played by a major orchestra.
- July 16 – John Jacob Niles hears the fragments of song in Appalachia that he adapts as the folk hymn "I Wonder as I Wander" completed on October 4 and first performed on December 19.
- Dec 31 – Leo Reisman and Fred Astaire have teamed up for the year's best-selling record, "Night and Day", which Victor reports has sold 22,811 copies (in the Depression-era market).
- The National Association for American Composers and Conductors is founded by Henry Hadley.
- Perry Como begins singing with the Freddie Carlone orchestra.
- Gorni Kramer forms his first jazz band.
- John Serry, Sr. performs as the first on stage concert accordion soloist at the Radio City Music Hall.
- Georges Bizet's Symphony in C is rediscovered in the library of the Conservatoire de Paris.

== Published popular music ==
- "After All, You're All I'm After" words: Edward Heyman music: Arthur Schwartz. Introduced by John Ball in the play She Loves Me Not.
- "Ah, But Is It Love?" w. E. Y. Harburg m. Jay Gorney. Introduced by Lillian Miles and Roger Pryor in the film Moonlight And Pretzels
- "Annie Doesn't Live Here Any More" w. Joe Young & Johnny Burke m. Harold Spina
- "Are You Makin' Any Money?" w.m. Herman Hupfeld. Introduced by Lillian Miles in the film Moonlight And Pretzels
- "Beautiful Girl" w. Arthur Freed m. Nacio Herb Brown. Introduced in the film Stage Mother.
- "Bei Mir Bist Du Schoen" w.(English language) Sammy Cahn & Saul Chaplin (Yiddish) Jacob Jacobs m. Sholem Secunda
- "Black Moonlight" w.m. Arthur Johnston & Sam Coslow. Introduced by Kitty Kelly in the film Too Much Harmony.
- "Blue Jazz" m. Gene Gifford
- "Blue Lou" w.m. Edgar Sampson & Irving Mills
- "Blue Prelude" w.m. Joe Bishop & Gordon Jenkins
- "Boulevard of Broken Dreams" w. Al Dubin m. Harry Warren
- "Build a Little Home" w. Al Dubin m. Harry Warren. Sung by Eddie Cantor in the film Roman Scandals.
- "By a Waterfall" w. Irving Kahal m. Sammy Fain. Introduced by Ruby Keeler and Dick Powell in the film Footlight Parade.
- "Carioca" w. Gus Kahn & Edward Eliscu m. Vincent Youmans. Introduced by Etta Moten in the film Flying Down to Rio.
- "Close Your Eyes" w.m. Bernice Petkere
- "Coffee in the Morning, Kisses in the Night" w. Al Dubin m. Harry Warren
- "The Day You Came Along" w.m. Arthur Johnston & Sam Coslow
- "Deep Purple" (When The Deep Purple Falls) w. Mitchell Parish m. Peter De Rose. Lyrics added in 1938.
- "Did You Ever See a Dream Walking?" w. Mack Gordon m. Harry Revel
- "Dinner at Eight" w. Dorothy Fields m. Jimmy McHugh
- "Doin' the Uptown Lowdown" w. Mack Gordon m. Harry Revel. Introduced by Frances Williams with Abe Lyman & his Orchestra in the film Broadway Thru a Keyhole
- "Don't Blame Me" w. Dorothy Fields m. Jimmy McHugh
- "Down the Old Ox Road" w. Sam Coslow m. Arthur Johnston
- "Drop Me Off in Harlem" w. Nick Kenny m. Duke Ellington
- "Dusty Shoes" w. E. Y. Harburg m. Jay Gorney. From the film Moonlight And Pretzels
- "Easter Parade" w.m. Irving Berlin
- "Everything I Have Is Yours" w. Harold Adamson m. Burton Lane
- "Experiment" w.m. Cole Porter
- "Flying Down to Rio" w. Edward Eliscu & Gus Kahn m. Vincent Youmans. Introduced by Fred Astaire in the film Flying Down to Rio
- "Forty-Second Street" w. Al Dubin m. Harry Warren
- "Gimme a Pigfoot (And a Bottle of Beer)" w.m. Coot Grant, Wesley Wilson
- "Give Me Liberty or Give Me Love" w. Leo Robin m. Ralph Rainger. Introduced by Claudette Colbert in the film Torch Singer
- " Gotta Get Up and Go to Work" w.m. Herman Hupfeld. From the film Moonlight and Pretzels
- "A Guy What Takes His Time" w.m. Ralph Rainger. Introduced by Mae West in the film She Done Him Wrong.
- "Happy as the Day Is Long" w. Ted Koehler m. Harold Arlen
- "Harlem on My Mind" w.m. Irving Berlin. Introduced by Ethel Waters in the musical As Thousands Cheer.
- "Heat Wave" w.m. Irving Berlin. Introduced by Ethel Waters in the revue As Thousands Cheer. Performed by Marilyn Monroe in the 1954 film There's No Business Like Show Business.
- "Hey, Young Fella" w. Dorothy Fields m. Jimmy McHugh
- "Honeymoon Hotel" w. Al Dubin m. Harry Warren. Introduced by Dick Powell and Ruby Keeler in the film Footlight Parade
- "How Could We Be Wrong?" w.m. Cole Porter. Introduced by Gertrude Lawrence in the musical Nymph Errant
- "How's Chances?" w.m. Irving Berlin, Introduced by Marilyn Miller and Clifton Webb in the musical As Thousands Cheer
- "A Hundred Years from Today" w. Ned Washington & Joe Young m. Victor Young
- "Hustlin' and Bustlin' for Baby" w.m. Harry M. Woods
- "I Cover the Waterfront" w. Edward Heyman m. John Green
- "I Found a New Way to Go to Town" Dubois, Ellison, Harvey
- "I Just Couldn't Take It Baby" w. Mann Holiner m. Alberta Nichols
- "I Like Mountain Music" w. James Cavanaugh m. Frank Weldon
- "I Took My Harp to a Party" w. Desmond Carter m. Noel Gay
- "I Wanna Be Loved" w. Edward Heyman & Billy Rose m. John Green
- "I'm No Angel" w.m. Gladys Du Bois, Ben Ellison & Harvey O. Brooks
- "I'm Satisfied" w. Mitchell Parish m. Duke Ellington
- "Inka Dinka Doo" w.m. Jimmy Durante & Ben Ryan
- "Isn't It a Pity?" w. Ira Gershwin m. George Gershwin. Introduced by George Givot and Josephine Houston in the musical Pardon My English
- "Isn't It Heavenly" w. E. Y. Harburg m. Joseph Meyer
- "It Isn't Fair" w.m. Richard Himber, Frank Warshauer & Sylvester Sprigato
- "It's Only a Paper Moon" w. E. Y. Harburg & Billy Rose m. Harold Arlen
- "It's the Talk of the Town" w. Marty Symes & Al J. Neiburg m. Jerry Livingston
- "I've Found the Right Girl" w.m. Stanley Lupino & Noel Gay
- "I've Got the World on a String" w. Ted Koehler m. Harold Arlen
- "I've Got to Sing a Torch Song" w. Al Dubin m. Harry Warren
- "Keep Young and Beautiful" w. Al Dubin m. Harry Warren
- "The Last Round-Up" w.m. Billy Hill
- "Lazybones" w.m. Johnny Mercer & Hoagy Carmichael
- "Learn to Croon" w. Sam Coslow m. Arthur Johnston
- "Let's Begin" w. Otto Harbach m. Jerome Kern. Introduced by George Murphy in the musical Roberta.
- "Let's Fall in Love" w. Ted Koehler m. Harold Arlen
- "Let's Make Love Like the Crocodiles" w. E. Y. Harburg m. Jay Gorney. From the film Moonlight and Pretzels
- "Lorelei" w. Ira Gershwin m. George Gershwin Introduced in the musical Pardon My English by Johnny Stewart, Gerry Martin and ensemble.
- "Love Locked Out" w. Max Kester m. Ray Noble
- "Love Me" w. Ned Washington m. Victor Young
- "Maria Elena" w. (Eng) S. K. Russell m. Lorenzo Barclelata
- "The Moment I Saw You" w.m. Noel Gay
- "Moonlight and Pretzels" w. E. Y. Harburg m. Jay Gorney. From the film Moonlight and Pretzels
- "Moonstruck" w. Sam Coslow m. Arthur Johnston
- "My Hat's on the Side of My Head" w.m. Harry M. Woods & Claude Hurlburt
- "My Little Grass Shack in Kealakekua, Hawaii" w.m. Billy Cogswell, Tom Harrison & Johnny Noble
- "My Moonlight Madonna" w. Paul Francis Webster m. William Scotti
- "My Shawl" w. (Eng) Stanley Adams (Sp) Pedro Berrios m. Xavier Cugat
- "My Song Goes 'Round the World" w.m. Hans May, Ernst Neubach & Jimmy Kennedy
- "Not for All the Rice in China" w.m. Irving Berlin
- "Nymph Errant" w.m. Cole Porter
- "Oceans of Time" w. Douglas Furber, Clifford Grey & Greatrex Newman m. Johnny Green
- "Old Father Thames" w.m. Raymond Wallace & Betsy O'Hogan
- "Old Man Harlem" w.m. Rudy Vallee & Hoagy Carmichael
- "On the Trail" w. Harold Adamson m. Ferde Grofe
- "One Morning in May" w. Mitchell Parish m. Hoagy Carmichael
- "Oodles of Noodles" m. Jimmy Dorsey
- "Pettin' in the Park" w. Al Dubin m. Harry Warren
- "I'm Popeye The Sailor Man" w.m. Sammy Lerner
- "The Physician" w.m. Cole Porter
- "The Pig Got Up and Slowly Walked Away" w.m. Benjamin Hapgood Burt
- "Remember My Forgotten Man" w. Al Dubin m. Harry Warren
- "Roll Up the Carpet" w. Raymond Klages m. Raymond Klages, Al Goodhart & Al Hoffman
- "Shadow Waltz" w. Al Dubin m. Harry Warren
- "Shanghai Lil" w. Al Dubin m. Harry Warren
- "She Loves Me Not" w. Edward Heyman m. Arthur Schwartz from the musical She Loves Me Not
- "Shuffle Off to Buffalo" w. Al Dubin m. Harry Warren
- "Smoke Gets in Your Eyes" w. Otto Harbach m. Jerome Kern
- "Snowball" w.m. Hoagy Carmichael
- "Solomon" w.m. Cole Porter from the musical Nymph Errant
- "Song of Surrender" w. Al Dubin m. Harry Warren
- "Sophisticated Lady" w. Mitchell Parish & Irving Mills m. Duke Ellington
- "Stormy Weather" w. Ted Koehler m. Harold Arlen
- "Supper Time" w.m. Irving Berlin. Introduced by Ethel Waters in the revue As Thousands Cheer
- "Sweetheart Darlin'" w. Gus Kahn m. Herbert Stothart. Introduced by Marion Davies in the film Peg o' My Heart
- "Tangmalangaloo" w. Patrick Hartigan m. Stephen Moreno
- "Temptation" w. Arthur Freed m. Nacio Herb Brown
- "Thanks" w. Sam Coslow m. Arthur Johnston
- "There's a Cabin in the Pines" w.m. Billy Hill
- "There's a Little Bit of You in Every Love Song" w. E. Y. Harburg m. Sammy Fain. From the film Moonlight and Pretzels
- "There's Something About a Soldier" w.m. Noel Gay
- "They Call Me Sister Honky Tonk" w.m. Gladys DuBois, Ben Ellison & Harvey O. Brooks
- "Tony's Wife" w. Harold Adamson m. Burton Lane
- "The Touch of Your Hand" w. Otto Harbach m. Jerome Kern
- "Twenty Million People" w. Sam Coslow m. Arthur Johnston from the film Hello, Everybody!
- "We'll All Go Riding on a Rainbow" Harry M. Woods
- "We'll Make Hay While the Sun Shines" w. Arthur Freed m. Nacio Herb Brown
- "We're in the Money" w. Al Dubin m. Harry Warren introduced by Ginger Rogers in the film Gold Diggers of 1933
- "Weep No More, My Baby" w. Edward Heyman m. John Green. Introduced by Billy House and Una Vilon in the musical Murder at the Vanities
- "When It's Lamp Lighting Time in the Valley" w.m. Joe Lyons, Sam C. Hart & The Vagabonds
- "When You Were the Girl on the Scooter" w. Mack Gordon m. Harry Revel. Introduced by Constance Cummings & Eddie Foy Jr. with Abe Lyman & his Orchestra in the film Broadway Thru a Keyhole
- "White Jazz" m. Gene Clifford
- "Who's Afraid of the Big Bad Wolf?" w. Frank Churchill & Ann Ronell m. Frank Churchill
- "Yesterdays" w. Otto Harbach m. Jerome Kern
- "You Are My Past, Present and Future" w. Mack Gordon m. Harry Revel. Introduced by Russ Columbo in the film Broadway Thru a Keyhole
- "You Gotta Be a Football Hero" w.m. Al Lewis, Al Sherman & Buddy Fields
- "You Ought to See Sally on Sunday" w.m. Harry M. Woods
- "Young and Healthy" w. Al Dubin m. Harry Warren
- "Your Mother's Son-In-Law" w. Mann Holiner m. Alberta Nichols
- "You're My Thrill" w. Sidney Clare m. Jay Gorney
- "You've Got Me Crying Again" w. Charles Newman m. Isham Jones

== Top popular recordings 1933 ==
There were many talented writers, producers and performers in the music industry during 1933, but record sales were very low, although higher than 1932, and work was hard to find. Most of the records released came from Radio Corporation of America (Victor) and American Record Corporation (ARC), through its premium (Brunswick label, and its discounted "dime store" labels (Perfect, Vocalion, Oriole, Banner, Melotone, Romeo, and Conqueror), with a trickle from Columbia (that would completely disappear by mid-1934). Four of the top five records paired one of the label's top vocalists (Fred Astaire, Bing Crosby and Al Bowlly) with a headline band (Reisman (Victor), Lombardo (Brunswick) and Ray Noble (Victor). Victor also featured Howard Arlen, composer of "Stormy Weather" as vocalist with house band Reisman. This tactic was extremely successful in stimulating sales in the depressed economic conditions.

The top popular records of 1933 listed below were compiled from Joel Whitburn's Pop Memories 1890–1954, record sales reported on the "Discography of American Historical Recordings" website, and other sources as specified. Numerical rankings are approximate, there were no Billboard charts in 1933, the numbers are only used for a frame of reference.

Rank	Artist	Title	Label	Recorded	Released	Chart positions
1	Leo Reisman and His Orchestra, vocal refrain by Fred Astaire	"Night and Day"	Victor 24193	November 22, 1932	January 13, 1933	US Billboard 1933 #1, US #1 for 10 weeks, 18 total weeks, Grammy Hall of Fame 2004, Jazz Standards 1932, 22,811 sales reported by Victor was top-selling record for 1933.
2	George Olsen and His Music (vocal Joe Morrison)	"The Last Roundup"	Columbia 2791-D	July 11, 1933	July 20, 1933	US Billboard 1933 #2, US #1 for 9 weeks, 24 total weeks
3	Leo Reisman and His Orchestra, vocal refrain by Harold Arlen	"Stormy Weather"	Victor 24262	February 28, 1933	April 7, 1933	US Billboard 1933 #3, US #1 for 8 weeks, 19 total weeks
4	Ray Noble and his New Mayfair Orchestra, vocal refrain by Al Bowlly	"Love Is the Sweetest Thing"	Victor 24333	September 8, 1932	June 1933	US Billboard 1933 #4, US #1 for 5 weeks, 16 total weeks
5	Guy Lombardo and His Royal Canadians with Bing Crosby	"You're Getting to Be a Habit with Me"	Brunswick 6472	January 12, 1933	February 1933	US Billboard 1933 #5, US #1 for 4 weeks, 14 total week
6	Paul Whiteman and His Orchestra, vocal refrain by Irene Taylor	"Willow Weep for Me"	Victor 24187	November 17, 1932	December 17, 1932	US Billboard 1933 #6, US #2 for 2 weeks, 7 total weeks, Jazz Standards 1932, 8,292 sales (second highest total 1933).
7	Ethel Waters	"Stormy Weather"	Brunswick 6564	May 3, 1933	May 1933	US Billboard 1933 #7, US #1 for 3 weeks, 11 total weeks, Added to National Recording Registry 2004, Grammy Hall of Fame 2003
8	Ray Noble and His New Mayfair Dance Orchestra, vocal refrain by Al Bowlly	"The Old Spinning Wheel"	Victor 24357	May 10, 1933	June 1933	US Billboard 1933 #8, US #1 for 3 weeks, 22 total weeks
9	Ted Lewis and His Band	"Lazybones"	Columbia 2786-D	June 22, 1933	July 1933	US Billboard 1933 #9, US #1 for 4 weeks, 11 total weeks
10	Bing Crosby	"Shadow Waltz"	Brunswick 6599	June 13, 1933	June 30, 1933	US Billboard 1933 #10, US #1 for 2 weeks, 8 total weeks
11	Don Bestor and His Orchestra	"Forty-Second Street"	Victor 24253	February 26, 1933	March 1933	US Billboard 1933 #11, US #1 for 3 weeks, 12 total weeks
12	Eddy Duchin and His Orchestra	"Did You Ever See a Dream Walking"	Victor 24477	December 1, 1933	December 13, 1933	US Billboard 1933 #12, US #1 for 3 weeks, 6 total weeks, Grammy Hall of Fame 1998
13	Guy Lombardo and His Royal Canadians	"The Last Round-up"	Brunswick 6662	September 27, 1933	October 1933	US Billboard 1933 #13, US #1 for 3 weeks, 8 total weeks
14	Duke Ellington And His Famous Orchestra	"Sophisticated Lady"	Brunswick 6600	May 16, 1933	June 3, 1933	US Billboard 1933 #14, US #1 for 5 weeks, 15 total weeks, Grammy Hall of Fame 2007
15	Bing Crosby	"Thanks"	Brunswick 6643	August 27, 1933	September 1933	US Billboard 1933 #15, US #2 for 2 weeks, 7 total weeks
16	Bing Crosby with Guy Lombardo and His Royal Canadians	"Young and Healthy"	Brunswick 6472	January 12, 1933	February 1933	US Billboard 1933 #16, US #2 for 2 weeks, 7 total weeks
17	Guy Lombardo and His Royal Canadians	"Stormy Weather (Keeps Rainin' All the Time)"	Brunswick 6550	April 12, 1933	April 1933	US Billboard 1933 #17, US #2 for 4 weeks, 10 total weeks
18	Eddy Duchin and His Orchestra	"Night And Day"	Brunswick 6445	January 5, 1933	January 17, 1933	US Billboard 1933 #18, US #2 for 3 weeks, 8 total weeks, Grammy Hall of Fame 1998
19	Bing Crosby	"Just an Echo in the Valley"	Brunswick 6454	March 10, 1933	March 31, 1933	US Billboard 1933 #19, US #2 for 2 weeks, 11 total weeks
20	Duke Ellington And His Famous Orchestra	"Stormy Weather (Keeps Rainin' All the Time)"	Brunswick 6600	May 16, 1933	June 3, 1933	US Billboard 1933 #20, US #1 for 5 weeks, 15 total weeks, Grammy Hall of Fame 2007
21	Don Bestor and His Orchestra	"The Last Round-Up"	Victor 24391	August 28, 1933	March 1933	US Billboard 1933 #21, US #2 for 2 weeks, 10 total weeks
22	Don Bestor and His Orchestra	"Who's Afraid Of The Big Bad Wolf?"	Victor 24410	October 4, 1933	October 1933	US Billboard 1933 #22, US #2 for 2 weeks, 8 total weeks
23	Guy Lombardo and His Royal Canadians	"Annie Doesn't Live Here Anymore"	Brunswick 6662	August 27, 1933	October 1933	US Billboard 1933 #23, US #2 for 2 weeks, 8 total weeks
24	Guy Lombardo and His Royal Canadians	"Did You Ever See a Dream Walking"	Brunswick 6713	November 27, 1933	December 1933	US Billboard 1933 #20, US #2 for 2 weeks, 7 total weeks

== Classical music ==
=== Premieres ===
Composer	Composition	Date	Location	Performers
Chávez, Carlos	Sinfonía de Antígona	December 15, 1933	Mexico City	Mexico Symphony – Chávez
Dallapiccola, Luigi	Partita	January 22, 1933	Florence, Italy	Pasini / Teatro Comunale Orchestra – Gui
Kodály, Zoltán	Dances of Galánta	October 23, 1933	Budapest, Hungary	Budapest Philharmonic Society Orchestra – Dohnányi
Messiaen, Olivier	Fantaisie burlesque	February 8, 1933	Paris, France	Casadesus
Revueltas, Silvestre	Janitzio	December 8, 1933	Mexico City	Mexico Symphony – Revueltas
Shostakovich, Dmitri	Piano Concerto No. 1	October 15, 1933	Leningrad, Soviet Union	Shostakovich / Leningrad Philharmonic – Stiedry
Shostakovich, Dmitri	Preludes for piano	May 24, 1933	Leningrad, Soviet Union	Shostakovich

=== Compositions ===
- Kurt Atterberg – A Varmland Rhapsody
- Benjamin Britten – A Boy Was Born
- Carlos Chávez –
  - Sinfonía de Antígona (Symphony No. 1)
  - Soli Ifor oboe, clarinet, trumpet, and bassoon
- Aaron Copland – Short Symphony
- Paul Creston – Seven Theses for piano
- Luigi Dallapiccola – Partita
- Havergal Brian – Symphony No. 4 in C major 'Das Siegeslied'
- Gustav Holst – Lyric Movement
- Zoltán Kodály – Dances of Galánta
- Gian Francesco Malipiero
  - Sette Invenzioni, for orchestra
  - Symphony No. 1
  - Steel, film score
- Igor Markevitch – Psaume for soprano, female chorus and orchestra
- Xavier Montsalvatge – Tres Impromptus
- Silvestre Revueltas –
  - Esquinas, revised version, for orchestra
  - Janitzio, for orchestra
  - Ocho por radio, for chamber ensemble
  - El renacuajo paseador
  - Toccata (sin fuga), for violin and chamber orchestra
  - Troka
- Arnold Schoenberg –
  - Concerto for Cello and Orchestra (after Monn)
  - Concerto for String Quartet and Orchestra (after Handel, Concerto Grosso, op. 6, no. 7)
  - Drei Lieder, op. 48
- Dmitri Shostakovich – Piano Concerto No. 1
- Igor Stravinsky – Perséphone

== Opera ==
- Aaron Avshalomov – The Twilight Hour of Yan Kuei Fei
- Joseph Canteloube – Vercingétorix
- Louis Gruenberg – The Emperor Jones
- Gian Francesco Malipiero – La favola del figlio cambiato
- Richard Strauss – Arabella (1 July, Sächsisches Staatstheater, Dresden)
- Alexander Zemlinsky – Der Kreidekreis (14 October, Zürich Opera House)

== Film ==
- Leigh Harline – The Night Before Christmas (1933 film)
- Dmitri Shostakovich – The Tale of the Priest and of His Workman Balda (film)
- Max Steiner – King Kong (1933 film)
- Max Steiner – Morning Glory (1933 film)

== Musical theatre ==
- As Thousands Cheer (Music and lyrics: Irving Berlin, book: Moss Hart). Broadway revue opened at the Music Box Theatre on September 30 and ran for 400 performances
- Ball At The Savoy (Music: Paul Abraham, lyrics and book: Oscar Hammerstein II). London production opened at the Drury Lane Theatre on September 8 and ran for 96 performances.
- Bezauberndes Fräulein (Music and libretto: Ralph Benatzky). Musical comedy opened at the Volkstheater, Vienna on May 24.
- Command Performance London production opened at the Saville Theatre on October 17 and ran for 31 performances
- Gay Divorce (Music and lyrics: Cole Porter, book: Dwight Taylor). London production opened at the Palace Theatre on November 2 and ran for 180 performances
- Give Me a Ring London production opened at the Hippodrome on June 22 and ran for 239 performances.
- He Wanted Adventure London production opened at the Saville Theatre on March 28 and ran for 152 performances
- Melody – music by Sigmund Romberg. Broadway production opened at the Casino Theatre on February 14, 1933.
- Murder at the Vanities – music by Victor Young. Broadway production opened at the New Amsterdam Theatre on September 8 and moved to the Majestic Theatre on November 6 for a total run of 207 performances
- Music in the Air London production opened at His Majesty's Theatre on May 19 and ran for 275 performances
- Nice Goings On London production opened at the Strand Theatre on September 13 and ran for 221 performances
- Nymph Errant (Music and lyrics: Cole Porter, book: Romney Brent). London production opened at the Adelphi Theatre on October 6 and ran for 154 performances
- Pardon My English Broadway production opened at the Majestic Theatre on January 20 and ran for 43 performances
- Roberta (Music: Jerome Kern, lyrics and book: Otto Harbach). Broadway production opened at the New Amsterdam Theatre on November 18 and ran for 295 performances
- Shady Lady, Broadway production at the Shubert Theatre on July 5, 1933 and ran for 20 performances.
- That's a Pretty Thing (Music: Noel Gay, lyrics: Desmond Carter, book: Stanley Lupino) London production opened at Daly's Theatre on November 22 and ran for 103 performances

== Musical films ==
- 42nd Street, starring Warner Baxter, Bebe Daniels, George Brent, Ruby Keeler, Una Merkel, Ginger Rogers and Dick Powell
- Adorable, starring Janet Gaynor, Henry Garat and C. Aubrey Smith. Directed by William Dieterle.
- Adventures on the Lido, starring Alfred Piccaver, S. Z. Sakall and Nora Gregor, directed by Richard Oswald, with music by Bronislau Kaper
- Aunt Sally, starring Cicely Courtneidge and Sam Hardy and featuring Debroy Somers and his Band. Directed by Tim Whelan.
- A Bedtime Story, starring Maurice Chevalier, Helen Twelvetrees, Edward Everett Horton and Baby LeRoy.
- A Song Goes Round the World, starring Joseph Schmidt
- Bitter Sweet, starring Anna Neagle, Fernand Gravey and Ivy St Helier
- Born Lucky, starring Talbot O'Farrell and René Ray
- Broadway Thru a Keyhole starring Constance Cummings, Russ Columbo, Paul Kelly, Eddie Foy Jr., Blossom Seeley, Gregory Ratoff and Texas Guinan and featuring Frances Williams with Abe Lyman & his Orchestra. Directed by Lowell Sherman.
- College Humor released July 5, starring Bing Crosby, Jack Oakie, Mary Carlisle, George Burns, Gracie Allen and Mary Kornman.
- Dancing Lady starring Joan Crawford, Clark Gable, Franchot Tone and Robert Benchley and featuring Fred Astaire, Art Jarrett and Nelson Eddy.
- Facing the Music, starring Stanley Lupino and José Collins
- Flying Down to Rio released December 22, starring Dolores del Río, Gene Raymond, Ginger Rogers and Fred Astaire.
- Footlight Parade, starring James Cagney, Joan Blondell, Ruby Keeler and Dick Powell
- Going Hollywood released December 22, starring Marion Davies and Bing Crosby
- Gold Diggers of 1933, starring Warren William, Joan Blondell, Aline MacMahon, Ruby Keeler, Dick Powell and Ginger Rogers
- The Good Companions, starring Jessie Matthews, Edmund Gwenn and John Gielgud
- Happy, starring Stanley Lupino, Laddie Cliff, Will Fyffe and Harry Tate.
- Hello, Everybody!, starring Kate Smith, Randolph Scott and Sally Blane. Directed by William A. Seiter.
- I Am Suzanne, starring Lilian Harvey, Gene Raymond and Leslie Banks. Directed by Rowland V. Lee.
- Let's Fall in Love, starring Edmund Lowe, Ann Sothern and Art Jarrett
- Melody Cruise, starring Charles Ruggles. Phil Harris and Helen Mack
- Moonlight And Pretzels released August 1, starring Leo Carrillo and Mary Brian
- My Weakness starring Lilian Harvey, Lew Ayres, Charles Butterworth, Sid Silvers and Harry Langdon. Directed by David Butler.
- Roman Scandals starring Eddie Cantor, Ruth Etting, Gloria Stuart, David Manners and Edward Arnold. Directed by Frank Tuttle.
- Sitting Pretty starring Jack Oakie, Jack Haley, Ginger Rogers, Thelma Todd and The Pickens Sisters
- Take A Chance starring James Dunn, Cliff Edwards, June Knight, Lillian Roth, Charles "Buddy" Rogers and Marjorie Main.
- This Week of Grace starred Gracie Fields
- Too Much Harmony released on September 23, starring Bing Crosby, Jack Oakie and Kitty Kelly.
- Torch Singer starring Claudette Colbert, Ricardo Cortez and Lyda Roberti
- The Way to Love starring Maurice Chevalier, Ann Dvorak and Edward Everett Horton. Directed by Norman Taurog.

== Births ==
- January 17 – Dalida, French-born Italian singer (died 1987)
- January 18 – Ray Dolby, American inventor of the Dolby System (died 2013)
- January 20 – Ronald Townson, American pop singer and actor (The 5th Dimension) (died 2001)
- January 23 – Chita Rivera, American actress, dancer and singer (died 2024)
- January 27 – Anna Green, English soprano
- January 28 – Helena Tattermuschová, Czech soprano (died 2025)
- January 29 – Sacha Distel, French singer (died 2004)
- February 7 – Stuart Burrows, Welsh operatic tenor (died 2025)
- February 8 – Elly Ameling, Dutch soprano
- February 10 – Faramarz Payvar, Iranian composer and santur player (died 2009)
- February 17 – Bobby Lewis, American R&B singer (died 2020)
- February 18 – Yoko Ono, Japanese artist, wife of John Lennon and mother of Sean Lennon
- February 21 – Nina Simone, American soul singer (died 2003)
- February 22 – Katharine, Duchess of Kent, British patron of music
- March 9 – Lloyd Price, rock singer-songwriter (died 2021)
- March 13 – Mike Stoller, songwriter
- March 14 – Quincy Jones, arranger (died 2024)
- March 15 – Roy Clark, country musician (Hee Haw) (died 2018)
- March 25 – Wee Willie Harris, rock singer/performer (died 2023)
- March 28 – Tete Montoliu, jazz pianist (died 1997)
- April 12 – Montserrat Caballé, operatic soprano (died 2018)
- April 14
  - Buddy Knox, singer-songwriter (died 1999)
  - Morton Subotnick, American electronic composer
- April 19 — Jayne Mansfield, US actress and singer (d. 1967)
- April 24 – Freddie Scott, songwriter and singer (died 2007)
- April 25 – Jerry Leiber, songwriter (died 2011)
- April 26 – Ilkka Kuusisto, Finnish composer (died 2025)
- April 29 – Rod McKuen, songwriter (died 2015)
- April 30 – Willie Nelson, country singer-songwriter
- May 3 – James Brown, soul singer (died 2006)
- May 21 – Maurice André, trumpeter (died 2012)
- May 22 – Don Estelle, actor and singer (died 2003)
- May 29 – Helmuth Rilling, choral conductor (died 2026)
- June 17 – Christian Ferras, violinist (died 1982)
- June 18 – Colin Brumby, Australian composer and conductor (died 2018)
- June 22 – Libor Pešek, conductor (died 2022)
- June 26 – Claudio Abbado, Italian conductor (died 2014)
- July 1 – Felix Ayo, Spanish-born Italian violinist (died 2023)
- July 4 – La Prieta Linda, Mexican singer and actress
- July 15 – Julian Bream, English classical guitarist and lutenist (died 2020)
- July 23 – Bert Convy, American entertainer (died 1991)
- July 27 – Nick Reynolds, American folk musician (The Kingston Trio) (died 2008)
- July 29 – Anne Rogers, English actress, singer and dancer
- August 8 – Joe Tex, American soul singer-songwriter (died 1982)
- August 11 – Tamas Vasary, Hungarian pianist (died 2026)
- August 15
  - Bobby Helms, American country singer (died 1997)
  - Rita Hunter, British operatic soprano (died 2001)
  - Bill Pinkney, American R&B singer (The Drifters) (died 2007)
- August 17 – Mark Dinning, American singer (died 1986)
- August 21 – Janet Baker, English operatic mezzo-soprano
- August 25 – Wayne Shorter, American jazz saxophonist and composer (died 2023)
- September 1 – Conway Twitty, American country singer (died 1993)
- September 8
  - Asha Bhosle, Indian singer
  - Fresia Saavedra, Ecuadorian singer/songwriter (died 2024)
- September 14 – Harve Presnell, American actor and singer (died 2009)
- September 15 – Rafael Frühbeck de Burgos, Spanish conductor (died 2014)
- September 17 – Dorothy Loudon, American singer (died 2003)
- September 18 – Jimmie Rodgers, American pop singer (died 2021)
- September 25 – Ian Tyson, Canadian singer (Ian & Sylvia) (died 2022)
- October 10 – Daniel Massey, star of musical theatre (died 1998)
- October 17 – The Singing Nun (died 1985)
- October 21 – Georgia Brown, English actress and singer (died 1992)
- October 27 – Floyd Cramer, pianist (died 1997)
- November 3 – John Barry, film score composer (died 2011)
- November 6 – Joseph Pope, singer (The Tams) (died 1996)
- November 16 – Garnett Mimms, soul singer
- November 23 – Krzysztof Penderecki, composer (died 2020)
- November 26 – Robert Goulet, singer and actor (died 2007)
- November 29 – John Mayall, blues musician (died 2024)
- December 6 – Henryk Górecki, Polish composer (died 2010)
- December 13 – Wayne Bennett, American blues guitarist (died 1992)
- December 31 – Pedro Ignacio Calderón, Argentine conductor (died 2026)

== Deaths ==
- January 6 – Vladimir de Pachmann, pianist (born 1848)
- January 10 – Roberto Mantovani, violinist (born 1854)
- January 12 – Václav Suk, violinist, conductor and composer (born 1861)
- January 16 – Willy Burmester, violinist (born 1869)
- January 18 – Oskar Zawisza, priest and composer (born 1878)
- January 23 – Albert "Sonny" Cunha, musician, composer and bandleader (born 1879)
- February 12 – Henri Duparc, composer (born 1848)
- February 17 – Toktogul Satylganov, improvising poet and singer (born 1864)
- February 18 – Arnold Mendelssohn, composer and music teacher (born 1855)
- March 26 – Eddie Lang, jazz musician (born 1902)
- April 4 – Ewald Straesser, composer (born 1867)
- April 9 – Sigfrid Karg-Elert, composer (born 1877)
- April 12 – Lola Artôt de Padilla, operatic soprano (born c.1876)
- May 10 – Selma Kurz, operatic soprano (born 1874)
- May 26 – Jimmie Rodgers country singer, "The Singing Brakeman" (born 1897)
- June 19 – Yossele Rosenblatt, cantor and composer (born 1882)
- June 24 – Matilda Sissieretta Joyner Jones, operatic soprano and vaudeville singer (born 1869)
- July 6 – Robert Kajanus, conductor and composer (born 1856)
- July 14 – Raymond Roussel, author and pianist (born 1877)
- July 15 – Freddie Keppard, jazz musician (born 1890)
- July 26 – Charles Tindley, gospel music composer (born 1851)
- August 3 – Arthur Collins, singer (born 1864)
- August 14 – Eugen Haile, singer and composer (born 1873)
- August 29 – Georgi Conus, composer (born 1862)
- September 7 – Marcel Journet, operatic bass (born 1867)
- September 10
  - Adrian Ross, English lyricist (born 1859)
  - Giuseppe Campari, opera singer and racing driver (born 1892) (in a motor racing accident)
- October – Joan Winters, Broadway dancer (born 1909) (murdered)
- October 6 – Zakaria Paliashvili, composer (born 1871)
- October 16 – Maurice Renaud, operatic baritone (born 1860)
- October 23 – Orville Harrold, operatic tenor (born 1878)
- October 27 – Julius Klengel, cellist (born 1859)
- November 3 – William Lavin, tenor (born 1864)
- December 1 – Blind Blake, blues musician (born c. 1893)
- December 7 – Jan Brandts Buys, composer (born 1868)
- date unknown – Manuel Torre, flamenco singer (born 1878)
