= Patti Pickens =

American performer

Patti Pickens (1917 – November 16, 1995) was an American performer.

Pickens was born in Macon, Georgia. With her sisters Jane Pickens and Helen Pickens, she performed as part of the Pickens Sisters in the 1930s. They also appeared in the short comedy film 20,000 Cheers for the Chain Gang.

Pickens was in the musical Thumbs Up! staged from December 1934 into 1935. Pickens appeared on the cover of the September 1936 issue of Popular Songs Magazine. She married Robert Simmons of the Revelers in 1937.

She retired from show business in the 1950s to raise her family. She returned to the stage in the 1970s.

Pickens died in 1995.

== Filmography ==
- 20,000 Cheers for the Chain Gang (1933)
- Sitting Pretty (1933)
- Rambling 'Round Radio Row #7 (1933)
