= Did You Ever See a Dream Walking? =

"Did You Ever See a Dream Walking?" is a popular song, introduced by Art Jarrett in the 1933 film Sitting Pretty.

The music was written by Harry Revel, the lyrics by Mack Gordon. The song was originally published in 1933 and there were charted versions in the USA that year by Eddy Duchin (#1 in the charts), Guy Lombardo (#2), Bing Crosby (#5), and Meyer Davis (#6). Since then, there have been many covers of the song, including Henry Hall's 1933 cover, Al Bowlly with Ray Noble and his Orchestra (1933), Matt Monro (1957), Dorothy Lamour (1957), Michael Holliday (1959), Max Bygraves (1960), and a version by Frankie Avalon for the 1960 album Summer Scene. Bing Crosby re-recorded the song as part of a medley on his album On the Sentimental Side (1962).

== In popular culture ==
- An instrumental version was part of the musical score by Clarence Wheeler in the 1946 George Pal Puppetoon Together in the Weather starring Punchy and Judy. Appears in The Puppetoon Movie produced and directed by Arnold Leibovit.
- An instrumental version is used in the 1934 Popeye cartoon A Dream Walking.
- The Bing Crosby version of the song was used as a plot point in the 1988 film Lady in White.
- The Bing Crosby version of the song was used in the end credits of A Nightmare on Elm Street 2: Freddy's Revenge.
- The Bing Crosby version of the song was used in Pennies from Heaven (1981)
- The Bing Crosby version of the song was used in The Locusts (1997)
- The Gene Austin version of the song was featured in the 1999 film The Green Mile.
- A version of the song performed by Sunny Gale was featured in the 2009 film Precious: Based on the Novel "Push" by Sapphire.
- In the fan film The Confession of Fred Krueger, the character of Freddy sings it to himself, while starting a fire.
- In the Laverne & Shirley episode: "Why Did the Fireman..." (Season 5, Episode 18 – original air date: February 4, 1980), Laverne sings the first line of this song when thinking about her fireman boyfriend, who dies in a fire just before proposing marriage to her.
