= Kazuhiro Morita =

Japanese composer and arranger (born 1952, died 2021)

Kazuhiro Morita (森田一浩 or Morita Kazuhiro, born 1952 in Tokyo; died 2021) was a Japanese composer and arranger.

Morita studied with Yoshio Hasegawa at the Tokyo University of the Arts. He is known as an arranger, reworking pieces like Appalachian Spring by Aaron Copland, Galánta Dances by Zoltán Kodály, Don Juan and an excerpt from Salome by Richard Strauss, The Miraculous Mandarin by Béla Bartók, Symphony No. 1 by Gustav Mahler, the second suite from the ballet Daphnis et Chloé by Maurice Ravel and the Rhapsody on a Theme of Paganini by Sergei Rachmaninoff. He is also noted for his arrangements of anime scores (including Castle in the Sky, Princess Mononoke, and Kiki's Delivery Service) and his original compositions. He taught at Shobi University.

From 1991 to 1994, he served as a member of the Japan Band Clinic Committee. Since 2015, he has also been selected as a member of the selection committee for the All Japan Wind Orchestra Competition. He died on August 25, 2021, from multiple myeloma.

== Works ==
Band

- Pop Step March
- Serenade
- Flower Clock
- Fanfare I
- Mana in October
- Canticle of the South

Chamber works

- Aubade for clarinet ensemble
- Bagatelles on the name of Bach for clarinet ensemble
- Kumamoto Folk Tunes for clarinet ensemble
- Pele for clarinet quartet
- Rumba sequence for clarinet quartet
- Elegia, Ritmica and Sambo-Ostinato for clarinet ensemble
- Terpsichore I for brass octet
