= Supper Time =

1933 song by Irving Berlin, introduced by Ethel Waters

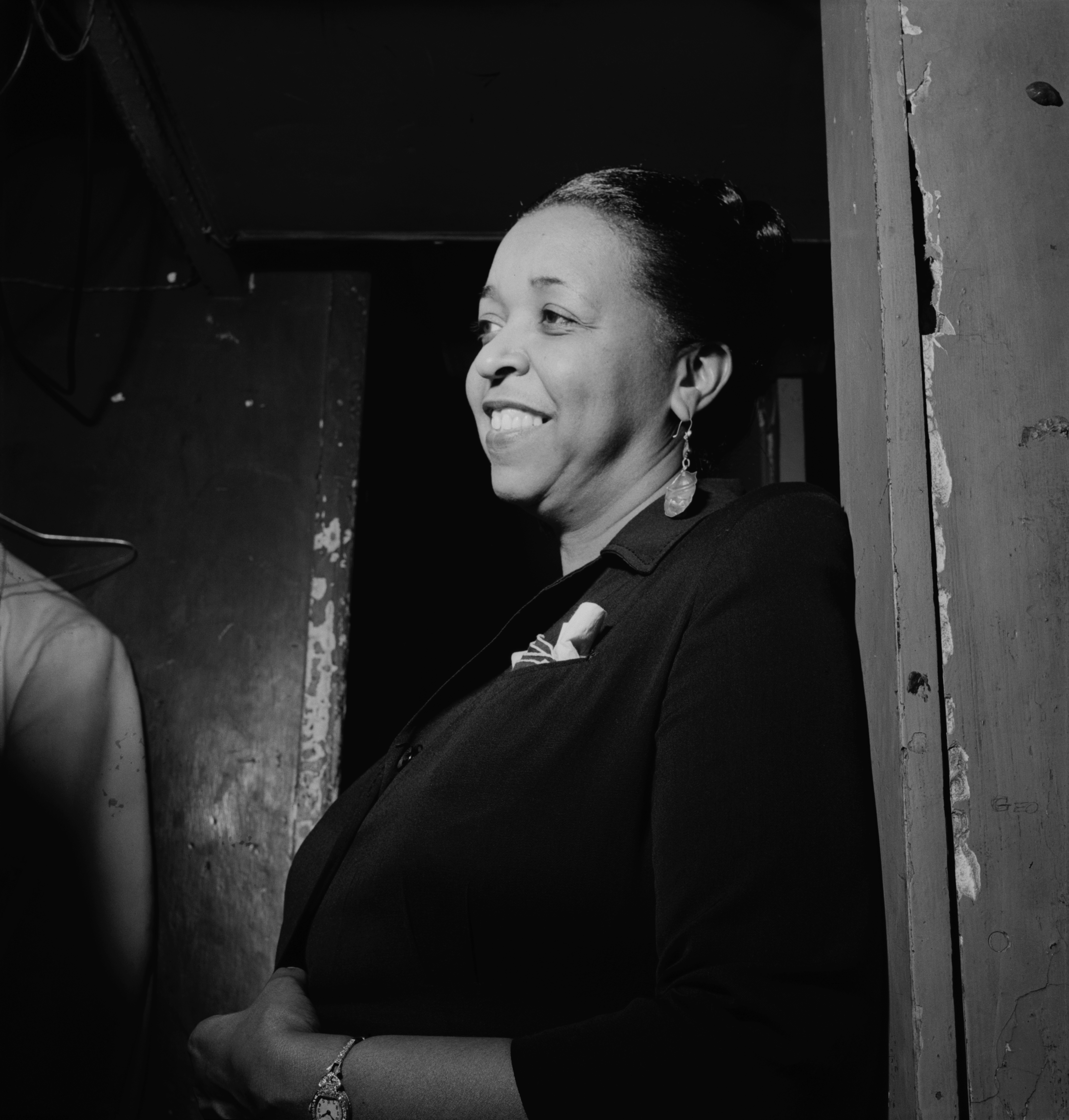

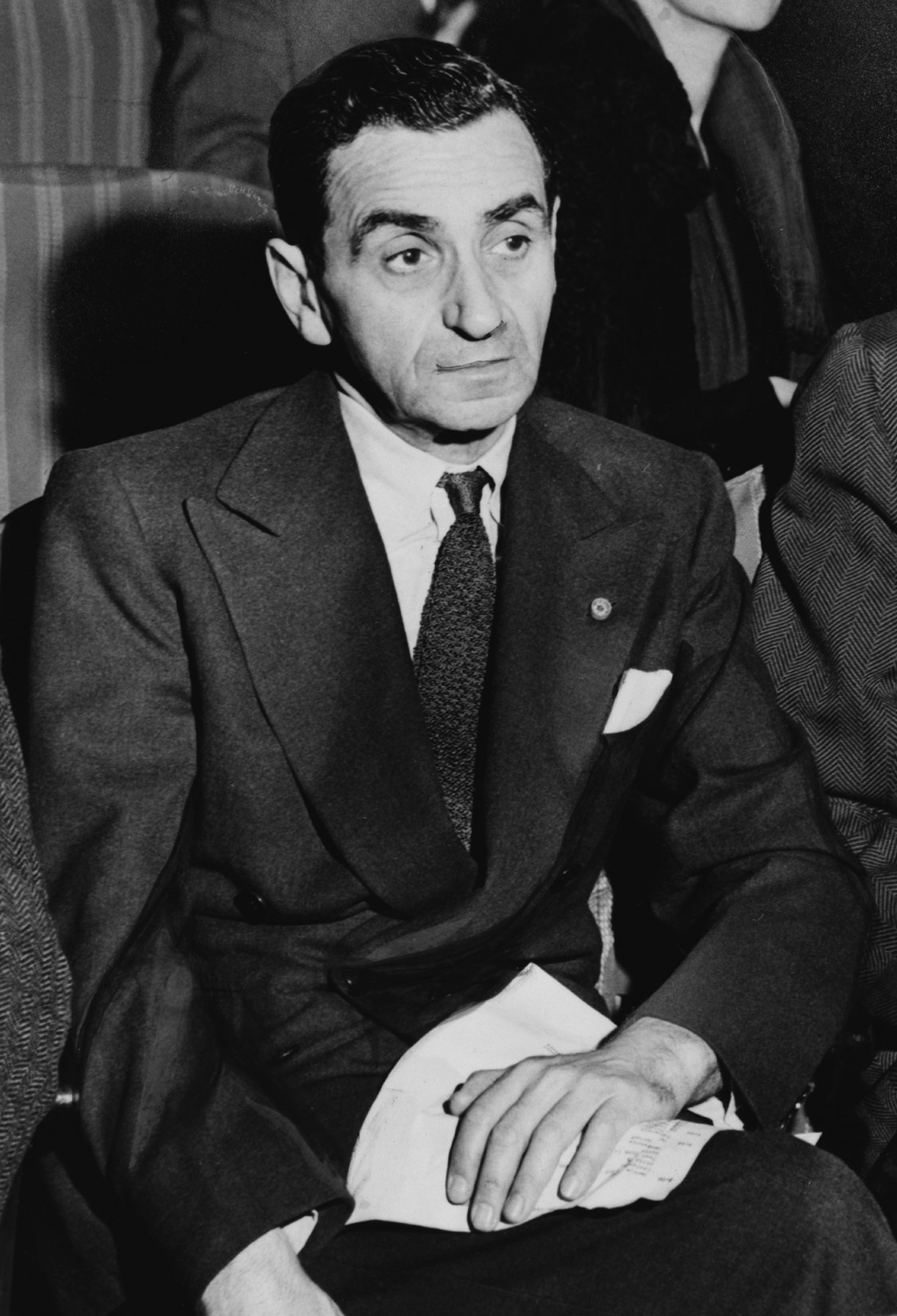
Ethel Waters and Irving Berlin in the 1940s

"Supper Time" is a popular song written by Irving Berlin for the 1933 musical As Thousands Cheer, where it was introduced by Ethel Waters. The song is about racial violence inspired by a newspaper headline about a lynching.

== History ==
Berlin wrote the musical As Thousands Cheer with the librettist Moss Hart in Bermuda. Berlin's biographer, Laurence Bergreen, described it as "the best work he had ever done for the stage" and consisting of "nothing but hits". The score included the songs "Easter Parade", "Harlem on My Mind", "Heat Wave" and "How's Chances?" in addition to "Supper Time". The musical was a satirical revue of recent events that had made news headlines with parodies of President Herbert Hoover, John D. Rockefeller Jr., Barbara Hutton, Noël Coward, Edward, Prince of Wales, and Joan Crawford and Douglas Fairbanks Jr.

=== Context and composition ===
Berlin first met Waters in the spring of 1933 during her headlining appearances at the Cotton Club in Harlem. Berlin was immediately impressed by Waters and wanted her for As Thousands Cheer. Water's subsequent performance in As Thousands Cheer marked the first time that a black woman had ever starred in a Broadway musical. "Supper Time" was introduced by Waters as the second song of Act II of the musical. The song followed "Metropolitan Opening" a sketch about the economic woes of patrons at New York's Metropolitan Opera during the recent Great Depression. Waters was depicted on stage standing next to a table in a shack set in the Southern United States. The headline "Unknown Negro Lynched By Frenzied Mob" accompanied the song. Bergreen described the "Supper Time" as a "magnificently understated lament of the wife of the victim who must tell her children that they will never see their father again". Bergreen felt that the song was not a protest song as Berlin had "so personalized and muted the incendiary racial aspects of the event that what the song lost in bite it gained in universality". Waters said of the song that "If one song can tell the whole tragic history of a race, "Supper Time" was that song. In singing it I was telling my comfortable, well-fed, well-dressed listeners about my people...those who had been slaves and those who were now downtrodden and oppressed." Waters said that Berlin had "...wanted to do something dramatic to feel, to bring home to the people as a whole about the cruelty of mob violence". Berlin told Waters that he wanted her to "...show the agony of the family that's left behind" after a lynching and Waters felt that "...anything I do I can take a reference from my personal life". In performing the song Waters drew on her experience of staying with a family in Macon in Georgia. A man of the family had been lynched shortly before Waters' arrival in Macon and she spoke of the fact that "nothing was said, but oh the grief that, you know, and the fear. ...you never sensed the pall that comes over it. Oh, it was just—you could feel it. You didn't see nothing. This is an actual fact. I don't know if I can express it the way that I would without the Lord's help". Berlin later said that people told him he was "crazy to write a dirge like that", but felt that the satirical musical required a serious song. The song was inspired by the lynching of an African-American man in Florida that Berlin had read about.

Jeffrey Magee writing in Irving Berlin's American Musical Theater in 2014 felt that the extended bridge and the return to the principal phrase of "Supper Time" marked a "stroke of songwriting genius" with the repetition of the word 'Lord' forming the melodic peak of the song.

=== Reception ===
At the tryout for As Thousands Cheer at the Forrest Theatre in Philadelphia, three of the musical's stars, Helen Broderick, Marilyn Miller, and Clifton Webb, refused to take a bow at the end of the show with Waters. Berlin told the three that as a result there would be no bows at the next performance, and they subsequently bowed with Waters at the next performance. Miller and Webb also complained to the producer of the musical, Sam H. Harris about the presence of "Supper Time" in the score as it jarred with their light-hearted song "Society Wedding". Harris insisted that the song would remain.

Some reviewers were critical of the song. Wolcott Gibbs writing for the New Yorker described himself as "mildly distressed" by "Supper Time" as it "definitely seemed to belong somewhere else...In Mr Harris's safe, possibly". John Mason Brown, reviewing the show for the New York Post wrote that "I do wish Miss Waters would find another song to take the place of "Supper Time", which neither fits her gifts nor fits into the general scheme of things...".

In June 2026, CBS News included the song in its list of the 250 essential American songs of the past 250 years.

== Notable recordings ==
- Artie Shaw with Helen Forrest on his Artie Shaw Album (1939)
- Ella Fitzgerald - Ella Fitzgerald Sings the Irving Berlin Songbook (1958)
- Oscar Peterson - from the album Oscar Peterson Plays the Irving Berlin Songbook (1959)
- Barbra Streisand from the album People (1964).
- Judy Garland - from The Judy Garland Show episode 26 that aired on 29 March 1964
- Carola Standertskjöld from the album Carola & Heikki Sarmanto Trio (recorded 1966, issued 2004)
- Nancy Wilson - But Beautiful (1969)
- Judy Holliday - Holliday with Mulligan (1980)
- June Christy - Through the Years (1995), Cool Christy (2002)
- Audra McDonald from the album Happy Songs (2002)
