= 1933 in British music =

This is a summary of 1933 in music in the United Kingdom.

== Events ==
- December – Edward Elgar, knowing he is suffering from cancer and does not have time to complete his Third Symphony, tells William Henry Reed: "Don't let them tinker with it, Billy – burn it!"

== Popular music ==
- "My Lucky Day" and "Happy Ending" by Harry Parr-Davies, performed by Gracie Fields.

== Classical music: new works ==
- Arnold Bax – Symphonic Scherzo
- Arthur Bliss – Viola Sonata
- Benjamin Britten – A Boy Was Born
- Rebecca Clarke – The Tiger
- Eric Coates – London Suite.
- Gustav Holst
  - Brook Green Suite
  - Lyric Movement
- Ralph Vaughan Williams – A London Symphony (revised)

== Film and incidental music ==
- Bretton Byrd – Friday the Thirteenth
- Colin Wark
  - Song of the Plough
  - Doss House

== Musical theatre ==
- 22 November – That's a Pretty Thing (Music: Noel Gay Lyrics: Desmond Carter Book: Stanley Lupino) opens at Daly's Theatre and runs for 103 performances.

== Musical films ==
- Aunt Sally, starring Cicely Courtneidge and Sam Hardy and featuring Debroy Somers and his Band. Directed by Tim Whelan.
- Bitter Sweet, directed by Herbert Wilcox, starring Anna Neagle and Fernand Gravey
- Facing the Music, directed by Harry Hughes, starring Stanley Lupino, José Collins and Nancy Brown
- The Good Companions, directed by Victor Saville, starring Jessie Matthews and Edmund Gwenn
- Happy, directed by Frederic Zelnik, starring Stanley Lupino, Dorothy Hyson, Laddie Cliff and Will Fyffe.
- That's a Good Girl, starring Jack Buchanan, Elsie Randolph|

== Births ==
- 20 January – Gerry Monroe, singer (died 1989)
- 7 February – Stuart Burrows, operatic tenor (d. 2025)
- 14 February – James Simmons, poet, literary critic and songwriter (died 2001)
- 22 February – Katharine, Duchess of Kent, patron of music (d. 2025)
- 1 March – Gerry Bron, record producer and manager (d. 2012)
- 6 March – Dolly Collins, folk musician, arranger and composer (died 1995)
- 14 April – Shani Wallis, actress and singer
- 21 April – Ian Carr, jazz musician, composer, writer, and educator (died 2009)
- 22 May – Don Estelle, actor and singer (died 2003)
- 30 May – Michael Garrick, jazz pianist and composer (died 2011)
- 10 June — Ian Campbell, folk singer (died 2012)
- 15 July – Julian Bream, guitarist and lutenist
- 23 July – Bernard Roberts, pianist (died 2013)
- 29 July – Anne Rogers, actress, singer and dancer
- 15 August – Rita Hunter, operatic soprano (died 2001)
- 21 August – Dame Janet Baker, operatic mezzo-soprano
- 23 August – Ian Fraser, Emmy-nominated composer, conductor, arranger and music director (died 2014)
- 10 October – Daniel Massey, star of musical theatre (died 1998)
- 21 October – Georgia Brown, actress and singer (died 1992)
- 3 November – John Barry, film composer (died 2011)
- 23 November – John Sanders, organist, conductor and composer (died 2003)
- 10 December – Don Charles, singer and record producer (died 2005)
- 30 December – Andy Stewart, singer (died 1993)

== Deaths ==
- 3 March – Robert Radford, bass singer, 58
- 15 April – Ernest Bucalossi, British-Italian light music composer and arranger, 73
- 26 April – Francesco Berger, pianist and composer, 98
- 10 September – Adrian Ross, English lyricist, 73

== See also ==
- 1933 in British television
- 1933 in the United Kingdom
- List of British films of 1933
