= Beautiful Girl (Bing Crosby song) =

1933 popular song

Song by Bing Crosby with Lennie Hayton and his Orchestra
- Published: 1933 by Robbins Music Corp.
- Recorded: September 27, 1933
- Genre: Jazz; American Dance Music; Traditional Pop
- Length: 3:20
- Label: Brunswick 6694
- Composer: Nacio Herb Brown
- Lyricist: Arthur Freed

"Beautiful Girl" is a song with music by Nacio Herb Brown and lyrics by Arthur Freed, first published in 1933. It was originally written for the Metro-Goldwyn-Mayer film Stage Mother (1933) and appeared the same year in another MGM production – Going Hollywood (1933), where it was sung by Bing Crosby, whose rendition charted in the US at number 11 for 3 weeks.

== Background ==
"Beautiful Girl" was introduced by a vaudeville singer and actor Sam Ash in a pre-Code Metro-Goldwyn-Mayer motion picture Stage Mother (1933). It appeared in a show sequence, where it was danced to by Maureen O'Sullivan. The original arrangement and orchestration of the song was made by Jack Virgil and was conducted by Lou Silvers. The master recording of Ash's version was on August 7, 1933. (Note: The original recording remained unreleased until 2002, when it became part of a Deluxe 50th Anniversary Edition of Singin' in the Rain soundtrack.)

The first commercial recording of "Beautiful Girl" however, was made by Freddy Martin and his Orchestra on September 20, 1933. A version recorded a week later by Bing Crosby with Lennie Hayton's Orchestra became a hit, charting at number 11 on Billboard for 3 weeks. Released in December the same year Going Hollywood (1933) contained another interpretation of the song by Crosby, in a different key.

According to the labels on shellac records, the target dance for "Beautiful Girl" is the foxtrot.

Re-arranged by Roger Edens and Conrad Salinger, the song appeared in a musical film Singin' in the Rain (1952). Under the direction of returning Lennie Hayton, it was sung by Jimmie Thompson during the "Beautiful Girl Montage" segment.

== Renditions ==
Date	Main recording artist	Vocalist	Notes	Ref.
August 7, 1933	Sam Ash		Soundtrack recording for Stage Mother (1933).	
September 20, 1933	Freddy Martin and his Orchestra	Terry Stand	First commercial recording of the song.	
September 26, 1933	Harry Reser and his Eskimos	Jimmy Brierly		
September 27, 1933	Bing Crosby		Featuring Lennie Hayton and his Orchestra.	
October 3, 1933	Bernie Cummins and his New Yorkers	Walter Cummins		
October 4, 1933	Ozzie Nelson and his Orchestra	Ozzie Nelson		
October 11, 1933	Don Bestor and his Orchestra	Neil Buckley		
January 4, 1934	Paul Whiteman and his Orchestra	Bob Lawrence	Live recording for the Kraft Music Hall radio program.	
June 8, 1951	Jimmie Thompson		Soundtrack recording for Singin' in the Rain (1952).	

== Charts ==
Chart (1933)	Peak position
US Billboard	11
