= 1933 in British television =

This is a list of events related to British television in 1933.

== Events ==
- 21 April – The first television revue, Looking In, is shown on the BBC. The first four minutes of this programme survive on a Silvatone record, an early method of home video recording.
- September – BBC Television Policy, Rumours and Facts is published.

== Births ==
- 10 January – Anton Rodgers, actor (died 2007)
- 12 January – Michael Aspel, journalist and television presenter
- 15 January – Frank Bough, journalist and television presenter (died 2020)
- 18 January – David Bellamy, botanist, author, broadcaster and environmental campaigner (died 2019)
- 6 February – Leslie Crowther, television comedian and game show host (died 1996)
- 22 February – Sheila Hancock, actress
- 6 April – Dudley Sutton, actor (died 2018)
- 11 April – Derek Martin, actor (EastEnders) (died 2026)
- 16 April – Joan Bakewell, broadcaster
- 24 April – Claire Davenport, actress (died 2002)
- 30 April – Dickie Davies, television presenter (died 2023)
- 14 May – Siân Phillips, Welsh actress
- 15 May – Shirley Dynevor, Welsh actress (died 2023)
- 23 May – Joan Collins, actress
- 25 May – Biddy Baxter, children's television producer (died 2025)
- 2 August – Tom Bell, actor (died 2006)
- 21 August – Barry Norman, film critic (died 2017)
- 18 September – David McCallum, actor (died 2023)
- 25 September – Eric Chappell, sitcom writer (died 2022)
- 30 September – Barbara Knox, actress
- 10 October – Daniel Massey, actor (died 1998)
- 3 November – Jeremy Brett, actor (died 1995)
- 13 December – Brian Elliott (Patton Brothers), comedy performer
- 22 December – Richard Whitmore, newsreader

== See also ==
- 1933 in British music
- 1933 in the United Kingdom
- List of British films of 1933
