= Jane Pickens =

American singer

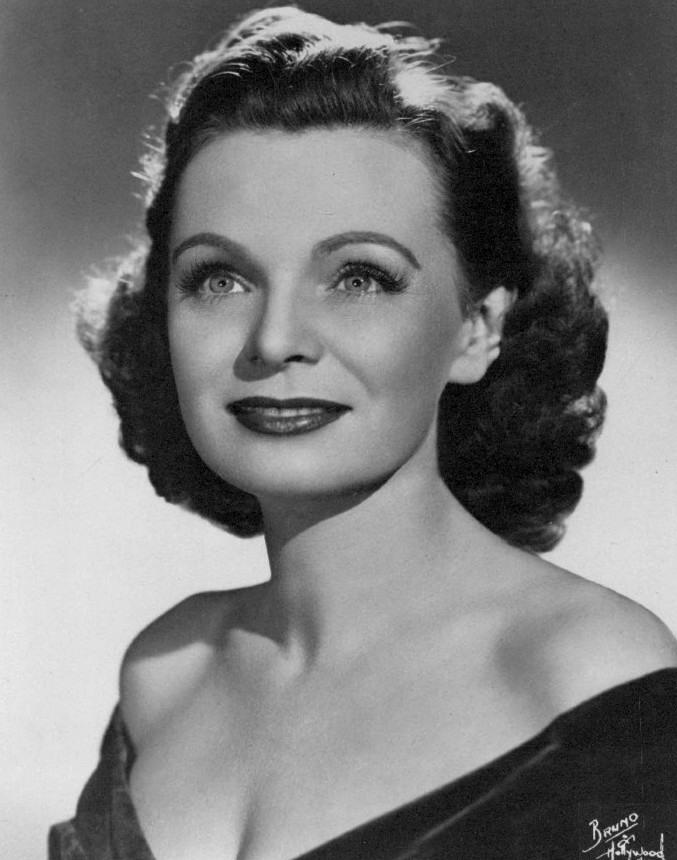
- Jane Pickens circa 1940s to early 1950s
- Born: August 10, 1907; Macon, Georgia
- Died: February 21, 1992 (aged 84); Newport, Rhode Island
- Other names: Jane Pickens Langley; Jane Pickens Hoving
- Spouse(s): Russell A. Clark or Clarke (1928 - ?); William C. Langley (1954 - ?); Walter Hoving (1977-1989, his death)
- Children: 1

Jane Pickens Hoving (August 10, 1907 – February 21, 1992) was an American singer on Broadway, radio and television for 20 years and later an organizer in numerous philanthropic and society events. She was the musical leader of the Pickens Sisters, a trio born on a Georgia plantation that reached national stardom in the 1930s with its own radio show, concert tours, and records.

== Pickens Sisters ==
The daughters of Mr. and Mrs. P.M. Pickens, the Pickens sisters, Grace, Jane, Helen, and Patti, were born in Macon, Georgia, and grew up there and in Atlanta. Beginning when the girls were ages 4, 6 and 8, their parents taught them to harmonize. Their father, a cotton broker, played the piano and their mother sang.

At first the sisters sang for friends, then at churches and schools. The family moved to Park Avenue in Manhattan in 1932, and a test recording for Victor made such an impression with radio executives that they hired the sisters unseen. Promoted as "Three Little Maids From Dixie", they appeared in Thumbs Up on Broadway and in the movie Sitting Pretty.

Signed to Victor as Victor's answer to the popular Brunswick recording artists the Boswell Sisters, they recorded 25 sides for Victor from early 1932 until late 1934. Their records had a much more novel quality than the harder jazz-styled Boswell Sisters' records. Also, signed with Victor records in 1932 the Three X Sisters, had a two- and three-part harmonizer approach, similar, yet were radio miked in with sweet/swingy bands.

The Pickens group earned $1 million in five years but dissolved when two sisters left to get married and a fourth, Grace, who was the group's manager, also departed. Grace married U.S. District Attorney John T. Cahill. Patti married radio actor Bob Simmons. In 1948 she had a radio program in Bethlehem, Pennsylvania.

== Education ==
Of the sisters Jane Pickens, who arranged the group's numbers, was the most serious about music. She studied at the Curtis Institute in Philadelphia and the Fontainebleau in France and won fellowships at the Juilliard School where she studied voice with Anna Eugénie Schoen-René. She studied for two years with Marcella Sembrich, a Polish coloratura soprano.

== Career ==
Picken's professional debut was uncredited when she sang on radio station WSB during a vacation while she was a student at Curtis Institute. The announcer introduced her as Miss Incognito because she didn't know whether authorities at the school would be pleased about her performing on radio.

She sang in the Ziegfeld Follies of 1936 in a cast that included Fanny Brice and Gypsy Rose Lee. In 1940 she played opposite Ed Wynn in Boys and Girls Together on Broadway. Brooks Atkinson's review said she had "a most attractive voice."

Pickens' other Broadway credits included Music in the Air (1951).

Pickens's first formal concert was in Chillicothe, Missouri, on February 15, 1949. She said that she had trained for concerts, but her life had taken a different direction, going back to her singing with her sisters and continuing with her work on radio. She had performed in concert settings before that night, but other performers were involved in each of those occurrences.

Pickens pursued her music career alone and had wide-ranging success, from musical comedy to opera and nightclub engagements. She had the American Melody Hour on CBS radio and the Jane Pickens Show on NBC radio, as well as a program on ABC television.

In 1954, Pickens appeared in a 15-minute ABC television musical series, The Jane Pickens Show, which was replaced in the spring by The Martha Wright Show.

She frequently performed benefits for charitable causes, including events for orphans, hospitals, youths, veterans and the disabled. When her career tapered off in the late 1950s, she turned to running hundreds of fund-raising affairs. Among her favorite causes were the Salvation Army and research into heart disease and cerebral palsy, a condition that afflicted her daughter.

== Personal ==
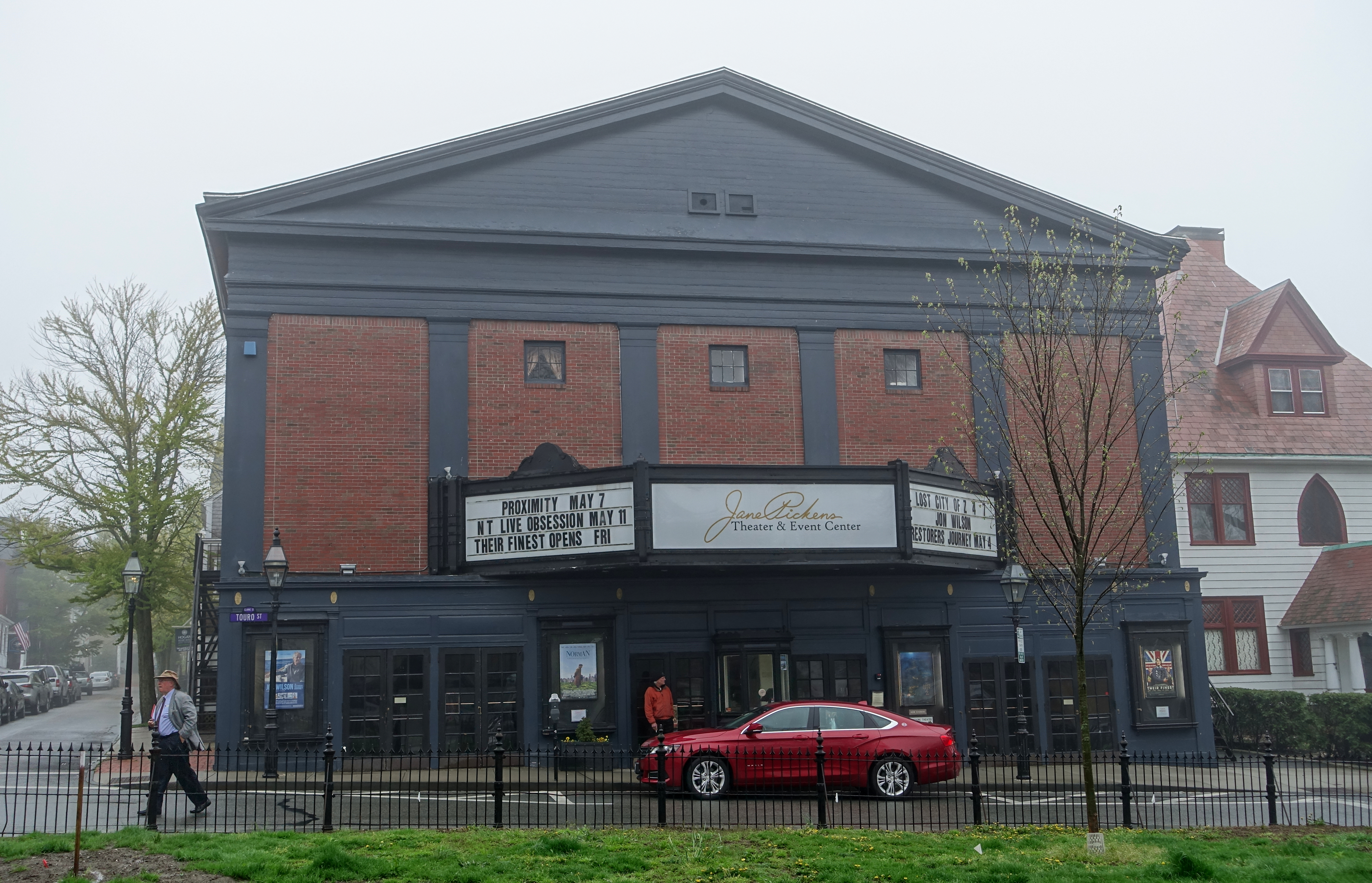
The Jane Pickens Theater in Newport

On June 6, 1928, at the age of 20, Pickens married Russell A. Clark (or Clarke). They had a daughter. The marriage ended in divorce.

Pickens's obituary in The New York Times said, "She became a noted figure at balls and other society events in New York City, Long Island and Newport." She married William C. Langley, a Wall Street broker, on March 26, 1954, in Westbury, Long Island. Following Langley's death, she married businessman Walter Hoving. He died in 1989.

Pickens's obituary in The New York Times said, "In 1972 she ran as the Republican-Conservative challenger to United States Representative Edward I. Koch in the Silk Stocking district on the East Side of Manhattan."

Pickens also painted. "I love to paint crystal," she said. Flowers were her favorite subject, roses in particular. She exhibited in galleries and sold dozens of paintings for charity.

She was 83 years old when she died of heart failure in Newport, Rhode Island, on February 21, 1992. She also had a home on Park Avenue in Manhattan.

== Recognition ==
In November 1949 Pickens received New York University's Annual Award Pickens for her "superb achievements in the musical and entertainment fields in general and for her stirring performance in Regina." The Jane Pickens Theater, a one-screen arthouse cinema that is the only remaining movie theater in Newport, was renamed after her in 1974. Pickens and her sister Patti performed at the dedication ceremony.
