= Arthur L. Jarrett =

American actor

- Born: Arthur Samuel Sullivan; February 11, 1884; Boston, Massachusetts, U.S.
- Died: June 12, 1960 (aged 76); New York, New York, U.S.
- Occupations: Actor, screenwriter
- Years active: 1914-1950
- Spouse: Mary Powers
- Children: 2, including Art Jarrett
- Relatives: William Jarrett (Cousin)

Arthur Samuel Jarrett (February 5, 1884 – June 12, 1960), often billed as Arthur L. Barrett was an American screenwriter and film actor. He wrote for 70 films between 1932 and 1947. He also appeared in 12 films between 1914 and 1950.

== Early life and career ==
Born Arthur Samuel Sullivan on February 5, 1884, in Boston, Massachusetts, Jarrett was the eldest of six children born to Elizabeth (née Ford) and Welsh-born actor Daniel Jarrett Sullivan. He began his stage career in the 1890s. He performed on stage in A Royal Rival in 1902. He also appeared in the touring company of Abie's Irish Rose in 1944 and on Broadway in The Bad Seed at the Coronet Theatre in 1955.

Jarrett worked in vaudeville on the Keith and Orpheum circuits, and he worked in films for Thomas H. Ince.

== Personal life and death ==
In 1906, Jarrett married actress Mary "Mae" Powers. They had a daughter and a son, singer Art Jarrett. He died of a heart attack on June 12, 1960 at his home in New York City, aged 76.
