= Brook Green Suite =

1933 composition by Gustav Holst

Gustav Holst's Brook Green Suite, H. 190, was written in 1933 for St Paul's Girls' School junior orchestra for strings and consists of 3 movements.

Holst wrote the suite while in hospital in the year before he died. The intention was to create a piece easy enough to play for younger members of the orchestra that is not simply a watered down version aimed at younger players or simple orchestrations of keyboard pieces.

The name is thought to originate from Brook Green, the place of his wedding to his wife Isobel in 1901, or because of the close proximity of the Brook to the school, but most obviously arises from the location of the school on Brook Green in Hammersmith, London. The piece is composed in a more traditional idiom than most of his later pieces.

== Structure ==
The movements are:

1. Prelude
2. Air
3. Dance

The first movement, the Prelude, is based on the C major scale, with the cellos covering 2 octaves of the scale.

The composer used music resembling English folk melody with harmony in the second movement, the Air, but it is not based on a traditional folk piece. The structure is reminiscent of the counterpoint of Lyric Movement, also written in 1933, which has full enharmonic relations but remains austere.

The final movement, the Dance, is based on a melody heard by Holst while in Sicily. The piece also originally contained a fourth movement, a Gavotte, which was removed after the first informal performance in 1934, the last concert Holst attended.

In early 1929, Holst heard a tune during a puppet show and he utilised it in the last movement.
