= The Jane Pickens Show (radio program) =

American radio music series (1948–1957)

The Jane Pickens Show is an American old-time radio music program that was broadcast in three distinct segments, one from 1948 to 1949, the second from 1951 to 1955; and the last (also known as Pickens Party) from 1955 to 1957. All three were broadcast on NBC. Perkins also had a program in 1933 on the NBC-Red network.

== 1948-1949 version ==
Jack Kilty was Jane Pickens's singing partner in this series, which debuted on July 4, 1948, at 5:30 p.m. Eastern Time. He was replaced by Bob Houston in 1949. The content was a mixture of then-current songs and music from the past. Norman Cloutier led the orchestra, Phil Leeds provided comedy, and the Jack Allison Sextette furnished additional music. Robert K. Adams was the producer, Edwin L. Dunham was the director, and Edward Eager was the writer. Robert Warren was the announcer.

The program differed from other shows in that it was almost entirely musical, "all of it is performed in song — announcements, song cues, introductions, and even to a lesser extent, the commercials". The program was sustaining. Beginning on July 27, 1948, it was moved to Tuesdays at 9 p.m. E. T. The November 7, 1948, episode featured recognition of Pickens, who was named Radio Flower Queen of National Flower week. During that broadcast Kilty sang "Bouquet of Roses", the official song of the National Florists Association. People in the studio audience received corsages of Pickens roses, a new variety that was named for the singer.

In late 1948, Pickens began making changes on the program. On the December 19, 1948, episode she sang the show's first operatic aria. On January 9, 1949, Paul Winchell was a guest. The series ended on August 22, 1949, so that Pickens could focus her efforts on a musical version of the play The Little Foxes, with rehearsals scheduled to begin on September 5, 1949.

Initially the program was broadcast on Tuesdays from 8:30 to 9 p.m. Eastern Time with Tums as the sponsor. From October 24, 1948, to March 20, 1949, it was on Sundays at 5 p.m. E. T. on a sustaining basis. It returned on Mondays from 9:30 to 10 p.m. E. T. from July 4, 1949, to August 22, 1949.

=== Critical response ===
In a review in The New York Times Jack Gould called the show "a pleasant and crisply produced summer program". He wrote that Pickens and Kilty performed songs as they were written, "avoiding the excessive stylization which so often obscures the melody". Gould suggested improvements in two aspects of the program — better comedy material and replacement of singing introductions to songs with straightforward introductions by the announcer.

The trade publication Billboard described the program's content as "smooth listening". Its review complimented the selection of songs and Pickens's and Kilty's "ability to render a ballad faithfully without twisting it into something hardly recognizable". It complimented Leeds's talent as a comedian but said that he was hampered by having "second-rate material". Overall, the review said that the show was better than many of its genre.

== 1951-1955 version ==
This version occupied various time slots, some of them 15 minutes long and some 30 minutes. Vermont was the featured state on the April 18, 1951, episode. In early 1952, Perkins was in Europe for a month on a trip that combined work and vacation. While there she recorded interviews with European celebrities. Alfred Drake substituted for her on the program while she was away. Dr. Frank Black conducted the orchestra for the 1951-1955 series. In January 1953, Knickerbocker Beer became the full sponsor of the program.

== 1955-1957 version (Pickens Party) ==
The third version, 15 minutes long and known as Pickens Party, debuted on December 3, 1955, and was broadcast on Saturdays at 6:45 p.m. E. T. until April 13, 1957.
