= Martha Wright (actress) =

American actress and singer

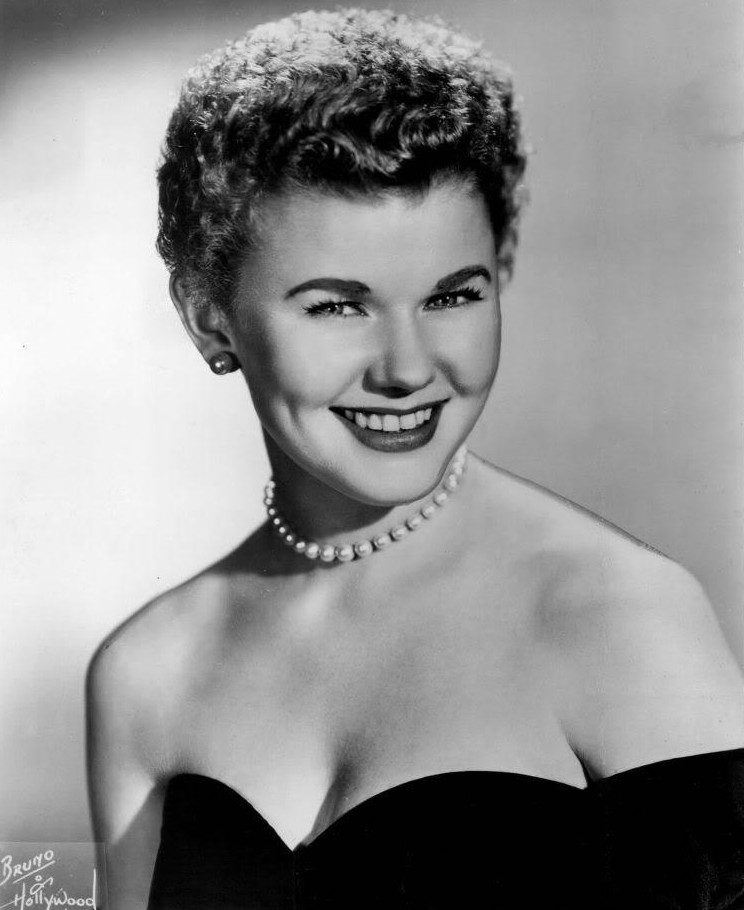
- Wright in 1955
- Born: Martha Lucile Wiederrecht; March 23, 1923; Seattle, Washington, U.S.
- Died: March 1, 2016 (aged 92); Newburyport, Massachusetts, U.S.
- Occupations: Actress, singer
- Years active: 1943–1983

Martha Wright (born Martha Lucile Wiederrecht; March 23, 1923 – March 1, 2016) was an American actress and singer best known for her performances on Broadway and on television.

A native of Seattle, Wright sang on the radio and played roles in musical theatre and opera as a teenager. She moved to New York City and debuted on Broadway by age 21, where she soon found success as Mary Martin's replacement in both South Pacific and The Sound of Music. She also continued to sing on the radio. From the mid-1950s Wright also performed on television, including in her own show. By the late 1960s she had curtailed her performances but returned for a few engagements in the 1970s and 1980s.

== Early life and career ==
Wright was born in Seattle, Washington to Frederick Wiederrecht, a plumber, electrician and handyman, who was also a tenor, and Lucile Wright (c. 1900–1976). She was raised in Duvall, Washington, where she began to study singing and piano with her maternal grandmother, Cora Wright (1874–1951), a pianist, singer and music teacher. Wright moved to Seattle in her teens and graduated from Franklin High School. At the age of seventeen, Wright began to sing on the radio in and around Seattle and attended the University of Washington for two years. Wright also began to sing opera at the same time, including in Mozart's The Abduction from the Seraglio and The Magic Flute. She then joined a touring company in the chorus of Up in Central Park.

Moving to in New York City, Wright began to sing on RKO-WOR Radio with its orchestra in 1947, with Sylvan Levin conducting. She soon became the understudy for Florence George as Désirée Artôt in the operetta Music in my Heart, with music by Pyotr Ilyich Tchaikovsky. Wright took over the role from the ailing George in out-of-town tryouts and created the role on Broadway (1947–48). Brooks Atkinson of The New York Times wrote of her performance: "One of the virtues is Martha Wright, the soprano. She at least appreciates the quality of last night's principal composer, and she has the voice and the training to put color into the music she is singing." Other early Broadway roles included Carol in the musical ghost story Great to Be Alive! (1950). She also appeared in supper clubs, including The Palmer House Hilton in Chicago, and came to the attention of Rodgers and Hammerstein, who cast her as Nellie Forbush in South Pacific (1951–54), to replace Mary Martin in the role. She played it for 1,047 performances, until it closed on Broadway, and then toured in the role. She then began to appear on television in The Eyes Have It and a CBS variety show called Three's Company and other programs. The New York Times called Wright "A coloratura soprano who personified the pert appeal of a 1950s ingénue".

She was married twice, first to T. W. "Teddy" Baumfeld, who helped manage her career. After they divorced, she married George J. Manuche Jr., a former U.S. Air Force pilot and owner of Mike Manuche's Restaurant in Manhattan, in 1955. In 1961, she again replaced Mary Martin in a Broadway role, Maria in The Sound of Music. She then performed in non-musical productions such as Mary, Mary at The National Theatre in Washington, D.C. She also continued to sing on the radio for WCBS in her own daily show for several years and recorded several albums such as Censored: Martha Wright Sings Cole Porter, Irving Berlin, Rodgers and Hart, and Others (Jubilee, 1956) and Love, Honor and All That Jazz: Songs for After the Honeymoon Is Over (RCA Victor, 1960). She also appears on Firestone Presents Your Christmas Favorites (1964) with Gordon MacRae, Franco Corelli, and Roberta Peters. On television, she appeared on The Bell Telephone Hour several times and in her own 15-minute series, The Martha Wright Show, which aired in 1954 on Sunday evenings on ABC opposite Ronald W. Reagan's General Electric Theater on CBS. She also appeared on The Ed Sullivan Show and The Tonight Show with Jack Paar. In 1961, she appeared in a Stephen Sondheim biographical special on CBS in their series The American Musical Theatre. She performed a solo act around the U.S. at venues such as The Cocoanut Grove nightclub at The Ambassador Hotel, Los Angeles. She was a World's Fair Ambassadress in Seattle in 1962.

== Later years ==
By the late 1960s, Wright had four children and had retired to raise her family. She had three daughters, Maria Manuche, Jayvie Anderson and Jenny Vellante; and a son, Michael Manuche. In 1964, however, she appeared on the NBC live broadcast of Cole Porter – An All-Star Tribute. She also appeared in Bell Telephone Hour telecasts with Duke Ellington and Maureen O'Hara.

Nearly every year from 1961 to 1989, Wright sang the "National Anthem" at home games of the New York Giants. In 1978, Wright returned to concert singing in A Tribute to Rodgers and Hart at the 92nd Street Y in Manhattan and A Tribute to Rodgers and Hammerstein the same year. In 1980, she performed The Sounds of Rodgers and Hammerstein at The King Cole Room in the St. Regis New York hotel in New York City, followed, in 1983, by A Salute to Burton Lane and E. Y. Harburg at the 92nd Street Y.

Wright and her husband retired to Massachusetts. He died in 2013. Wright died at the age of 92 in Newburyport, Massachusetts in 2016.
