= The Martha Wright Show =

American TV musical series and American radio musical series

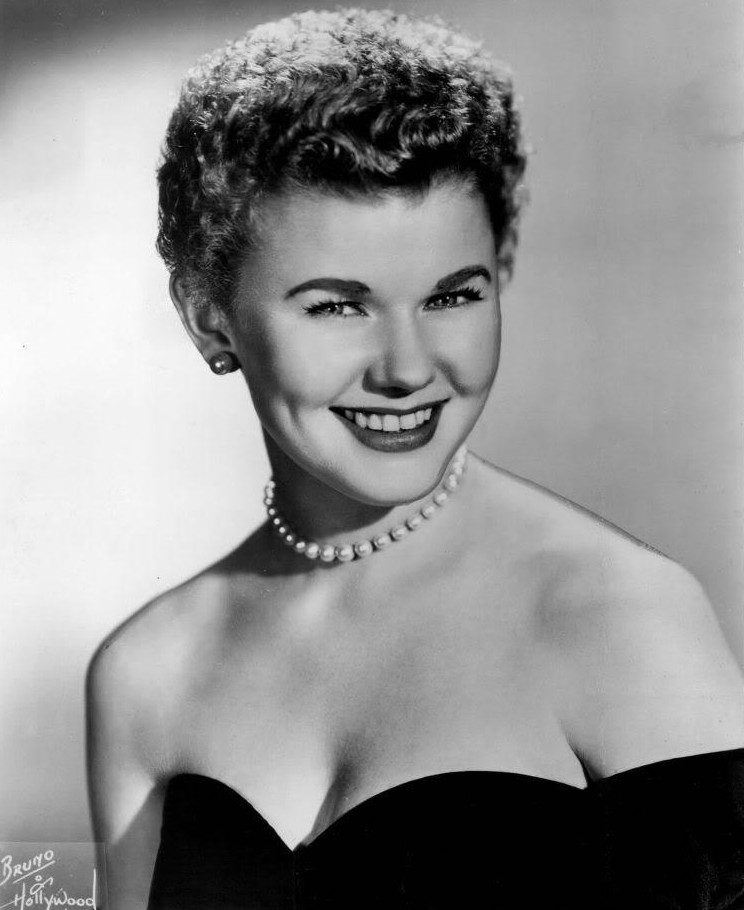
- Also known as: The Packard Showroom
- Country of origin: United States
- Original language: English

Original release
- Network: ABC
- Release: April 18 – December 5, 1954

The Martha Wright Show is the name of both an American television musical program (also known as The Packard Showroom) that was broadcast on ABC from April 18, 1954, through December 5, 1954, and a radio program that was broadcast on WCBS beginning in late 1954.

== Television ==
The Martha Wright Show replaced The Jane Pickens Show in April 1954. Pickens's program replaced Wright's show in July 1954, and in September 1954 Wright's program again replaced Pickens's. Singer Martha Wright starred in the quarter-hour program. Norman Paris played the piano, with trumpeter Bobby Hackett providing additional music. Hackett initially led a combo; when the show returned in September, he led a full orchestra.

=== Production ===
The Martha Wright Show was broadcast on Sundays from 9:15 to 9:30 p.m. Eastern Time. Fred Heider and Cort Steen were the initial producer and director, respectively. During the show's hiatus, they went to work on another program; when it returned, Matt Harlib filled both roles. Packard canceled the program when it decided to sponsor TV Reader's Digest, which debuted on January 17, 1955. The time slot vacated by Packard and the Wright program was taken by Ceba Incorporated for a new show.

=== Critical response ===
Harry MacArthur wrote in The Evening Star that The Martha Wright Show was "a pleasant if not precisely exciting musical interlude". MacArthur complimented Hackett's trumpet playing and wrote that Wright "can sing a song with proper respect for both melody and lyrics."

The trade publication Variety described the program as "a pleasant and simple quarter-hour of good music, unencumbered by a lot of production trappings and concentrating strictly on the music." It also complimented the performances of Wright, Hackett, and Paris.

== Radio ==
The Martha Wright Show radio program was broadcast weekday mornings on WCBS Radio. The program began shortly before Wright's TV show ended. Wright was primarily a disc jockey, playing records by artists such as Leroy Anderson, Don Cornell, Eddie Fisher, and Kitty Kallen, but she occasionally sang with piano accompaniment by Hal Hastings. Walter Cheetam was the director. Initially the show was on from 9:30 to 10 a.m. E. R.; in May 1959 it was moved to the 10-11 a.m. E. T. slot. A review in Variety said that Wright was "bright and personable" and complimented her work as a disc jockey and as a singer.
