= Trigger Pals =

1939 film

- Theatrical release poster
- Directed by: Sam Newfield
- Written by: George H. Plympton; Ted Richmond
- Produced by: Philip N. Krasne
- Starring: See below
- Cinematography: Jack Greenhalgh
- Edited by: S. Roy Luby
- Distributed by: Grand National Pictures
- Release date: January 13, 1939
- Running time: 55 minutes
- Country: United States
- Language: English

Trigger Pals is a 1939 American Western film directed by Sam Newfield.

== Cast ==
- Art Jarrett as Lucky Morgan
- Lee Powell as Stormy
- Al St. John as Fuzzy
- Dorothy Fay as Doris Allen
- Ted Adams as Harvey Kent
- Nina Guilbert as Minnie Archer
- Stanley Blystone as Steve
- Ernie Adams as Pete
- Earl Douglas as Henchman Jake
- Frank LaRue as Rancher Gates
- Ethan Allen as Sheriff
- Carl Mathews as Hank
