= 1933 in country music =

This is a list of notable events in country music that took place in the year 1933.

== Events ==
sales grew approximately 15% over 1932

== Top Hillbilly (Country) Recordings ==
The following songs were extracted from records included in Joel Whitburn's Pop Memories 1890-1954, record sales reported on the "Discography of American Historical Recordings" website, and other sources as specified. Numerical rankings are approximate, they are only used as a frame of reference.

Rank	Artist	Title	Label	Recorded	Released	Chart Positions
1	Gene Autry and Jimmy Long	"The Yellow Rose Of Texas"	Melotone 12700	March 1, 1933	June 5, 1933	US Hillbilly 1933 #1
2	Gene Autry	"The Last Round-Up"	Melotone 12832	October 9, 1933	November 1933	US BB 1933 #133, US #12 for 1 week, 3 total weeks, US Hillbilly 1933 #2
3	Jimmie Rodgers	"Peach-Pickin’ Time Down in Georgia"	Victor 23781	August 15, 1932	April 7, 1933	US Hillbilly 1933 #3
4	Tex Ritter	"Rye Whiskey"	Melotone 12664	February 14, 1933	June 11, 1933	US Hillbilly 1933 #4
5	Jimmie Rodgers	"Blue Yodel No. 12 (Barefoot Blues)"	Victor 24456	May 17, 1933	June 27, 1933	US Hillbilly 1933 #5
6	The Allen Brothers	"Lightning Bug Blues"	Victor 23805	December 5, 1932	January 1933	US Hillbilly 1933 #6
7	Jimmie Rodgers	"No Hard Times - Blue Yodel"	Victor 23751	August 15, 1932	February 1933	US Hillbilly 1933 #7, 4,258 sales
8	Gene Autry and Jimmy Long	"Cowboy's Heaven"	Melotone 12652	March 1, 1933	April 1933	US Hillbilly 1933 #8
9	Jimmie Davis and Rubye Blevins (Patsy Montana)	"Jealous Lover"	Victor 23778	November 4, 1932	March 24, 1933	US Hillbilly 1933 #9
10	Rambling Red Foley with the Cumberland Ridge Runners	"The Lone Cowboy"	Melotone 12718	April 11, 1933	June 1933	US Hillbilly 1933 #10
11	Jimmie Rodgers	"Gambling Barroom Blues"	Victor 23766	August 16, 1932	February 24, 1933	US Hillbilly 1933 #11
12	Rambling Red Foley with the Cumberland Ridge Runners	"Single Life Is Good Enough For Me"	Melotone 12718	April 11, 1933	June 1933	US Hillbilly 1933 #12
13	Jimmie Rodgers	"Miss the Mississippi and You"	Victor 23736	August 29, 1932	December 22, 1932	US Hillbilly 1933 #13, 3,791 sales
14	Carter Family	"The Church in the Wildwood"	Victor 40317	October 13, 1932	March 24, 1933	US Hillbilly 1933 #14
15	Jimmie Rodgers	"Blue Yodel No. 11 (I’ve Got a Gal)"	Victor 23796	November 27, 1929	June 1933	US Hillbilly 1933 #15
16	Bing Crosby	"The Last Round-Up"	Melotone 12832	October 9, 1933	November 1933	US BB 1933 #20, US #2 for 2 weeks, 5 total weeks, US Hillbilly 1933 #16
17	Cumberland Ridge Runners with John Lair	"Sally's Not The Same Old Sally"	Perfect 12914	April 11, 1933	September 1933	US Hillbilly 1933 #17
18	Jimmie Rodgers	"Mississippi Delta Blues"	Victor 23816	May 24, 1933	July 28, 1933	US Hillbilly 1933 #18
19	Jimmie Rodgers	"I’m Free (From the Chain Gang Now)"	Victor 23830	May 17, 1933	September 8, 1933	US Hillbilly 1933 #19
20	Gene Autry and Jimmy Long	"Answer To Twenty-One Years"	Melotone 12690	March 1, 1933	August 1933	US Hillbilly 1933 #20

== Births ==
- March 10 – Ralph Emery, radio and television personality. (died 2022)
- April 15 – Roy Clark, singer and multi-instrumentalist, host of television's Hee Haw (died 2018).
- April 30 – Willie Nelson, songwriter and key member of the 1970s "outlaw" movement.
- September 1 – Conway Twitty, singer-songwriter who successfully defected from 1950s rock music career to become a giant in the country genre from the 1960s through the early 1990s (died 1993).
- September 3 – Tompall Glaser, member of Tompall & the Glaser Brothers and leading member of the 1970s "outlaw" movement (died 2013).
- October 27 – Floyd Cramer, session pianist who had a series of hits in his own right (died 1997).
- November 21 – Jean Shepard, legendary female vocalist of the 1950s–1970s and a longtime Grand Ole Opry favorite (died 2016).

== Deaths ==
- May 26 – Jimmie Rodgers, 35, "The Singing Brakeman" who became country music's first bona fide superstar (tuberculosis).
