= The Pig Got Up and Slowly Walked Away =

Song
- Published: 1933
- Songwriter: Benjamin Hapgood Burt
- Composer: F. W. Bowers

"The Pig Got Up and Slowly Walked Away" is a 1933 temperance-themed joke song with music by F. W. Bowers and lyrics by Benjamin Hapgood Burt.

The song has been recorded by a number of artists including Frank Crumit (1934), Johnny Bond (1966), Jim Croce (1975), Sam Hinton, Rudy Vallée, Harry Belafonte, Clinton Ford and Acker Bilk.

It was also sung by Fozzie Bear in episode 209 of The Muppet Show.
