= As Thousands Cheer =

1933 musical

- As Thousands Cheer 1998 cast
- Music: Irving Berlin
- Lyrics: Irving Berlin
- Book: Moss Hart
- Productions: 1933 Broadway

As Thousands Cheer is a revue with a book by Moss Hart and music and lyrics by Irving Berlin, first performed in 1933. The revue contained satirical sketches and witty or poignant musical numbers, several of which became standards, including "Heat Wave", "Easter Parade" and "Harlem on my Mind". The sketches were loosely based on the news and the lives and affairs of the rich and famous, as well as other prominent personalities of the day, such as Joan Crawford, John D. Rockefeller Jr., Noël Coward, Josephine Baker, and Aimee Semple McPherson.

== History ==
The revue was a successor to the creators' Face the Music and was Marilyn Miller's last stage appearance before her death. It was also the first Broadway show to give an African-American star, Ethel Waters, equal billing with whites.

Moss Hart said that he and Irving Berlin did not want to write the typical revue with "blackout sketches" and musical numbers, and they had the idea of doing a topical revue "right off the front pages of the newspapers." Berlin deferred his own fees as composer, lyricist, and theater owner, keeping the cost of the show to a "restrained" $96,000.

== Synopsis ==
Each of the 21 scenes was preceded by a related newspaper headline, and the sketches poked fun at a wide variety of subjects, including the marital woes of Barbara Hutton, Gandhi, and British royalty. The weather report was turned into a song ("Heat Wave"). Other notable scenes include President and Mrs. Hoover leaving the White House, with the President giving his cabinet a Bronx cheer; "Supper Time", an African-American woman's lament for her lynched husband; John D. Rockefeller refusing to accept Radio City Music Hall as a birthday gift; commercials interrupting the singing during a Metropolitan Opera broadcast (P.D.Q. Bach later did this); a hotel staff falling under the influence of Noël Coward; and a fictional Supreme Court decision that says musicals cannot end with reprises, resulting in a new number, "Not for All the Rice in China" (satirizing Barbara Hutton's relationship with Alexis Mdivani), as a finale.

== Musical Numbers ==
=== Prologue ===
- Man Bites Dog - Jerome Cowan, Harry Stockwell, Company

=== Act I ===
- "How's Chances?" — Marilyn Miller, Clifton Webb
- "Heat Wave Hits New York" — Ethel Waters
- "Debts (Majestic Sails at Midnight)" — Helen Broderick, Leslie Adams, Jerome Cowan, Hal Forde, Harry Stockwell
- "Lonely Heart" and Dance - Harry Stockwell, Letitia Ide, Jose Limon
- "The Funnies" — Marilyn Miller
- "To Be or Not to Be"† — Ethel Waters
- "Easter Parade" — Marilyn Miller, Clifton Webb

=== Act II ===
- "Metropolitan Opera Opening" - Entire Company
- "Supper Time" — Ethel Waters
- "Shuffle Off to Buffalo (Gandhi Goes on Hunger Strike)" – Helen Broderick, Clifton Webb
- "Revolt in Cuba" - Letitia Ide, Jose Limon
- "Our Wedding Day" — Marilyn Miller, Clifton Webb
- "Harlem on My Mind" — Ethel Waters
- "Not for All the Rice in China" — Marilyn Miller, Clifton Webb

† Omitted from 1998 revival

== Productions ==
In James Kaplan’s biography of Berlin he writes

“The show had a successful tryout at Philadelphia’s Forrest Theatre in early September, although opening night was marred by an ugly incident all too in tune with the times: the stars Clifton Webb, Marilyn Miller, and Helen Broderick refused to take a bow with Ethel Waters. To his everlasting credit, Berlin told the three that of course he would respect their feelings – only in that case there needn’t be any bows at all.

“They took their bows with Waters at the next show.”

Irving Berlin: New York Genius, on page 147

The revue opened on Broadway at the Music Box Theatre on September 30, 1933, and became a hit, running for 400 performances, which was rare during the Great Depression. It was staged by Hassard Short with choreography by Charles Weidman. The musical starred Helen Broderick, Marilyn Miller, Clifton Webb and Ethel Waters, and featured José Limón as the lead dancer.

In 1934, Dorothy Stone took over the roles played by Miller.

A revision of the show, titled Stop Press, opened at the Adelphi Theatre in London on February 21, 1935. It dropped some of Berlin's songs and added several songs by Arthur Schwartz and Howard Dietz, and one, "How Can I Hold You Close Enough", by Johnny Green, Yip Harburg and Edward Heyman.

The Drama Department presented the revue at the off-Broadway Greenwich House Theater from June 2, 1998, through June 14, 1998. Directed by Christopher Ashley with musical staging by Kathleen Marshall, the cast included Kevin Chamberlin, Judy Kuhn, Howard McGillin, Paula Newsome, Mary Beth Peil and B. D. Wong. Reviews were extremely positive. The show has had a number of other revivals both in the U.S. and internationally.
