= Going Hollywood =

1933 film

- Theatrical release poster
- Directed by: Raoul Walsh
- Screenplay by: Donald Ogden Stewart
- Story by: Frances Marion
- Produced by: Walter Wanger
- Starring: Marion Davies; Bing Crosby
- Cinematography: George J. Folsey
- Edited by: Frank Sullivan
- Music by: Lennie Hayton
- Production companies: Cosmopolitan Productions; Metro-Goldwyn-Mayer
- Distributed by: Loew's Inc.
- Release date: December 22, 1933 (U.S.)
- Running time: 78 minutes
- Country: United States
- Language: English
- Budget: $914,000
- Box office: $962,000

Going Hollywood is a 1933 American pre-Code musical film directed by Raoul Walsh and starring Marion Davies and Bing Crosby. It was written by Donald Ogden Stewart based on a story by Frances Marion. The film was released by Metro-Goldwyn-Mayer on December 22, 1933.

== Plot ==
An infatuated school-teacher, Sylvia Bruce, follows Bill Williams, a popular crooner, to Hollywood where he is to make a picture. On board the train she obtains a job as maid to Bill's French fiancée and leading lady, Lili Yvonne, and meets the film's director, Conroy, and promoter, Baker. On arrival in Hollywood she is befriended by Jill and shares her rooms.

At the Independent Art Studio in Hollywood, where the film is being made, Lili's temperament and lack of talent cause Conroy much concern. Eventually, after losing her temper with a blackfaced Sylvia who pretends to be a fan asking for another star’s autograph, Lili refuses to continue unless Sylvia is removed from the studio. She is persuaded to stay and production continues with her singing "Cinderella's Fella" but Conroy is still not satisfied and an angry Lili walks out. Sylvia impersonates Lili's version of the song and ends with an imitation of Lili's tantrums. Lili returns in time to hear Sylvia and there is a brawl in which Lili gets a black eye. Baker, who has also heard Sylvia, intervenes by firing Lili and engaging Sylvia for the part.

Baker asks Sylvia to accompany him to a party but withdraws when Bill expresses his own interest in her. Bill takes Sylvia to dinner and the party but a quarrel ensues and she accuses him of insincerity. Bill deserts the film and goes with Lili to Tijuana where, drinking heavily, he receives a telephone call from the studio with the ultimatum that if he does not return they will get a replacement. Lili advises him to let them do so and suggests that they fly together to New York and on to Paris. Sylvia finds him and pleads for him to come back to the studio but returns without him.

In Hollywood there is difficulty with the player chosen to replace Bill and eventually Bill finally appears at the Studio to rejoin Sylvia in the film's closing sequence to sing "Our Big Love Scene".

The song "Beautiful Girl" is sung by Crosby at the beginning of the film before his departure for Hollywood when technicians arrive to record it. When he boards the train at Grand Central Terminal there is a big production number where he and the chorus sing "Going Hollywood". He also sings a few lines of "Just an Echo in the Valley". Crosby is also heard singing "Our Big Love Scene" on the radio when Jill is showing Sylvia her apartment. "We'll Make Hay While the Sun Shines" is a dream-sequence production number with thunderstorm effects at the Studio and is featured by Crosby, Davies, chorus and dancers. An impersonation act by The Radio Rogues is also filmed at the studio and includes imitations of Kate Smith ("When The Moon Comes Over The Mountain"). Russ Columbo ("You Call It Madness But I Call It Love"), Morton Downey ("Remember Me?") and Rudy Vallee ("My Dime Is Your Dime"). Crosby sings "After Sundown" at the party.

== Cast ==
- Marion Davies as Sylvia Bruce
- Bing Crosby as Bill "Billy" Williams
- Fifi D'Orsay as Lili Yvonne
- Stuart Erwin as Ernest Pratt Baker, producer
- Ned Sparks as Mr. Bert Conroy, director
- Patsy Kelly as Jill Barker
- Bobby Watson as Jack Thompson, press agent
- Sam McDaniel as Rasputin, train porter
- The Three Radio Rogues as group performing imitations:
  - Eddie Bartell
  - Jimmy Hollywood
  - Henry Taylor

== Soundtrack ==
The film's original songs were written by the team of Nacio Herb Brown (music) and Arthur Freed (lyrics).

- "Going Hollywood" (Brown / Freed) sung by Bing Crosby at the railroad station
- "Our Big Love Scene" (Brown / Freed) sung by Bing Crosby
- "Beautiful Girl" (Brown / Freed) sung by Bing Crosby
- "Just an Echo in the Valley" (Harry M. Woods / Jimmy Campbell / Reg Connelly) sung by Bing Crosby
- "We'll Make Hay While the Sun Shines" (Brown / Freed) sung by Bing Crosby, Marion Davies and chorus
- "Cinderella's Fella" (Brown / Freed) sung by Fifi D'Orsay, reprised by Marion Davies
- "Happy Days Are Here Again"
- "When the Moon Comes over the Mountain" sung by Jimmy Hollywood imitating Kate Smith
- "You Call It Madness (But I Call It Love)" (Russ Columbo / Con Conrad / Gladys Dubois / Paul Gregory) sung by Henry Taylor imitating Russ Columbo
- "Remember Me" (Jack O'Brien / Gus Kahn) sung by Jimmy Hollywood imitating Morton Downey
- "My Time Is Your Time" (Eric Little / Leo Dance) sung by Jimmy Hollywood imitating Rudy Vallée
- "After Sundown" (Brown / Freed) sung by Bing Crosby
- "Temptation" (Brown / Freed) sung by Bing Crosby.
  - "Temptation" was an early film attempt to fit a song into the story. It was performed dramatically by Crosby while drinking absinthe in a bar at Tijuana.

Crosby recorded some of the songs for Brunswick Records and "Temptation", "We'll Make Hay While the Sun Shines" and "Beautiful Girl" reached the charts of the day peaking at Nos. 3, 8 and 11 respectively.

== Production ==
Donald Ogden Stewart wrote the film for Marion Davies, who he called "an awfully good comedienne". He felt she and Bing Crosby "did a very good job together. She had a real hoydenish, don’t-give-a-damn feeling about her, and it came across on the screen. She was a good mimic, and she loved to make fun of people; but mainly she loved to have fun."

== Release ==
Going Hollywood was released on home video in May 1993. Warner released it on DVD in July 2013.

== Reception ==
The New York Times welcomed the film.

Blended properly with the holiday humors, Going Hollywood has enough basic liveliness to produce a sprightly and jocular mood at the Capitol. The overwhelming magnitude of the latter-day musical picture is gratefully absent from this one. It is warm, modest and good-humored. Bing Crosby has a manner and a voice, both pleasant, and the songs that Nacio Brown and Arthur Freed provide have a tinkle and a lilt. From the competent routine sentiments of “Our Big Love Scene” and the pleasing little pastoral lyric “We’ll Make Love When It Rains” they range down to that brooding song which Mr. Crosby, loaded with whisky and sorrow, sings across a Mexican bar while the glamorous Miss Davies is far away.

Variety' s reaction was mixed:

Pretentious musical with class in every department but one. It has names, girls and good music, but its story is weak from hunger and the script will prevent a big click. Fair is its rating. ... Marion Davies is starred and Bing Crosby featured, but Crosby will draw the bulk of what this one gets. Other assets are the music, the fact that it’s good, and that it has girls and plenty of them. .. From start to finish Crosby is constantly singing. It must be good singing because it doesn’t get tiresome, despite that it's laid on so heavy. ... At least three songs in the generally excellent score, as played by Lennie Hayton’s orchestra, sound promising. With Crosby there to sing ‘em the songs get a break, too.

TV Guide called it "fluffy fun" with a "literate and amusing screenplay". A reviewer on Turner Classic Movies praised Crosby's singing and said that his voice never falters. Jamie S. Rich of DVD Talk rated it 3.5/5 stars and wrote, "Going Hollywood is almost the perfect Hollywood movie musical cliché."

== Box office ==
The film grossed a total (domestic and foreign) of $962,000: $620,000 from the U.S. and $342,000 elsewhere resulting in a loss of $269,000.

== Radio adaptation ==
Going Hollywood was presented on Musical Comedy Theater December 10, 1952. The one-hour adaptation starred Denise Darcel, Andy Russell, and Mary McCarty.
