= Frances Williams (composer) =

Composer and conductor (1904–1978)

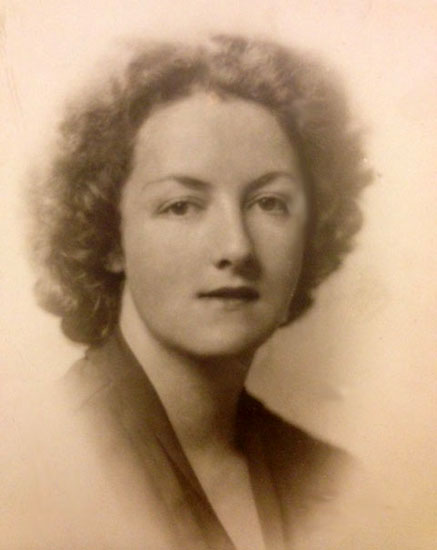
- Born: Elizabeth Frances Williams; 1904; Waunfawr, Caernarvonshire, Wales
- Died: 1978 (aged 73–74)
- Education: Juilliard Graduate School
- Occupations: Composer; conductor
- Spouse: Hugh Eric Davies (m. 1932)

Frances Williams (1904–1978) was a composer and conductor, particularly known for her choral works. She was born in Waunfawr in Caernarvonshire, Wales. In 1913, she emigrated to the United States with her family who settled in Seattle, Washington.

== Biography ==
Born Elizabeth "Lizzie" Frances Williams to parents Richard R Williams (1881–1927) and Katherine "Kate" Wright, née Owen (1884–1963). She was educated at the Cornish School of Music in Seattle, where she studied with Calvin Brainard Cady and Anna Brant Dall; holding scholarships in piano and in composition. She proceeded to Juilliard Graduate School, where she held fellowships in composition with Rubin Goldmark and in piano with James Friskin. She went on to have a career as a composer and conductor. She was a member of the National Association of Composers and of the Board of Governors of The Musicians' Club of New York.

Williams married Hugh Eric Davies (1905–1984) on 26 March 1932, in New York, but continued to use her maiden name professionally.

== Works ==
Williams was the composer of many published works, but she is best known for her setting for SATB and piano of words by Marjorie Elliott, "Let there be music". Other works include "To the Dawn" for festival chorus with orchestra, "Night" for women's voices, "Step Lightly o'er the Hallows" (for men and women's voices), "Praise the Lord, ye Heavens Adore Him", satb accompanied (1956), "The Day thou gavest", satb a capella (1951), "Be thou exalted O God" (Pss 57, 11, 66, 4, 8, 9) (1950) and "Holy Lord of All" (Welsh Chorale) TTBB.

She was a frequent conductor at Cymanfaoedd Canu (Welsh hymn-singing festivals) in the United States, including both sessions at the National Gymanfa Ganu held in Chicago in 1972. In 1961, she was awarded the Hopkins Medal of the St. David’s Society of the State of New York for her distinguished contributions to music. She was a member of Cymdeithas Emynau Cymru (Welsh Hymn Society) and contributed a number of reviews to its Journal. She was appointed by the WNGGA (Welsh National Gymanfa Ganu Association) as Chair of the editorial committee for its Jubilee Edition of the WNGGA Hymnal, which was published in 1979, but she died before this task was completed.
