= The Jane Pickens Show =

American radio and TV musical series

The Jane Pickens Show is the title of an American musical television series which aired January 31, 1954 - September 5, 1954, on ABC and a radio program broadcast on NBC from 1948 to 1949 and again from 1951 to 1957.

== TV series ==
The music program aired in 15-minute time slots and starred popular radio singer Jane Pickens with the backup vocal group The Vikings. The show was broadcast on Sundays, initially from 9:15 to 9:30 p.m. Eastern Time. In April 1954 it was moved to 6:30-6:45 p.m., and in July 1954 it was returned to its original time.

Music programs aired in 15-minute time-slots were a common type of show on the then-"Big 4" U.S. networks, with many popular singers such as Dinah Shore, Eddie Fisher, Perry Como etc. doing such series. They typically ran for 12–13 minutes excluding the ads, and many accompanied the evening news, which in those days was also 15-minutes.

=== Episode status ===
Four episodes are held by the UCLA Film and Television Archive.

== Radio ==
The Jane Pickens Show began on NBC radio on June 29, 1948, as a summer program. It returned on October 24, 1948, running until March 20, 1949, and returned again on July 4, 1949, ending on August 22, 1949. A longer run began on February 5, 1951, and continued until June 12, 1955. The show's final radio run (also known as Pickens Party) began on December 3, 1955, and ended on April 13, 1957.

Besides Pickens, Jack Kilty was heard regularly on the show in 1948 and Bob Houston was a regular in 1949. Robert Warren was the announcer in 1948. Norman Cloutier led the orchestra in 1948–49. Edwin L. Dunham was the program's director.

=== Critical response ===
The trade publication Variety described the premiere of the 1948 series as "a pleasant, unpretentious newcomer to radio" and complimented the singing of Pickens and Kilty.
