= Art Jarrett =

American singer (1907–1987)

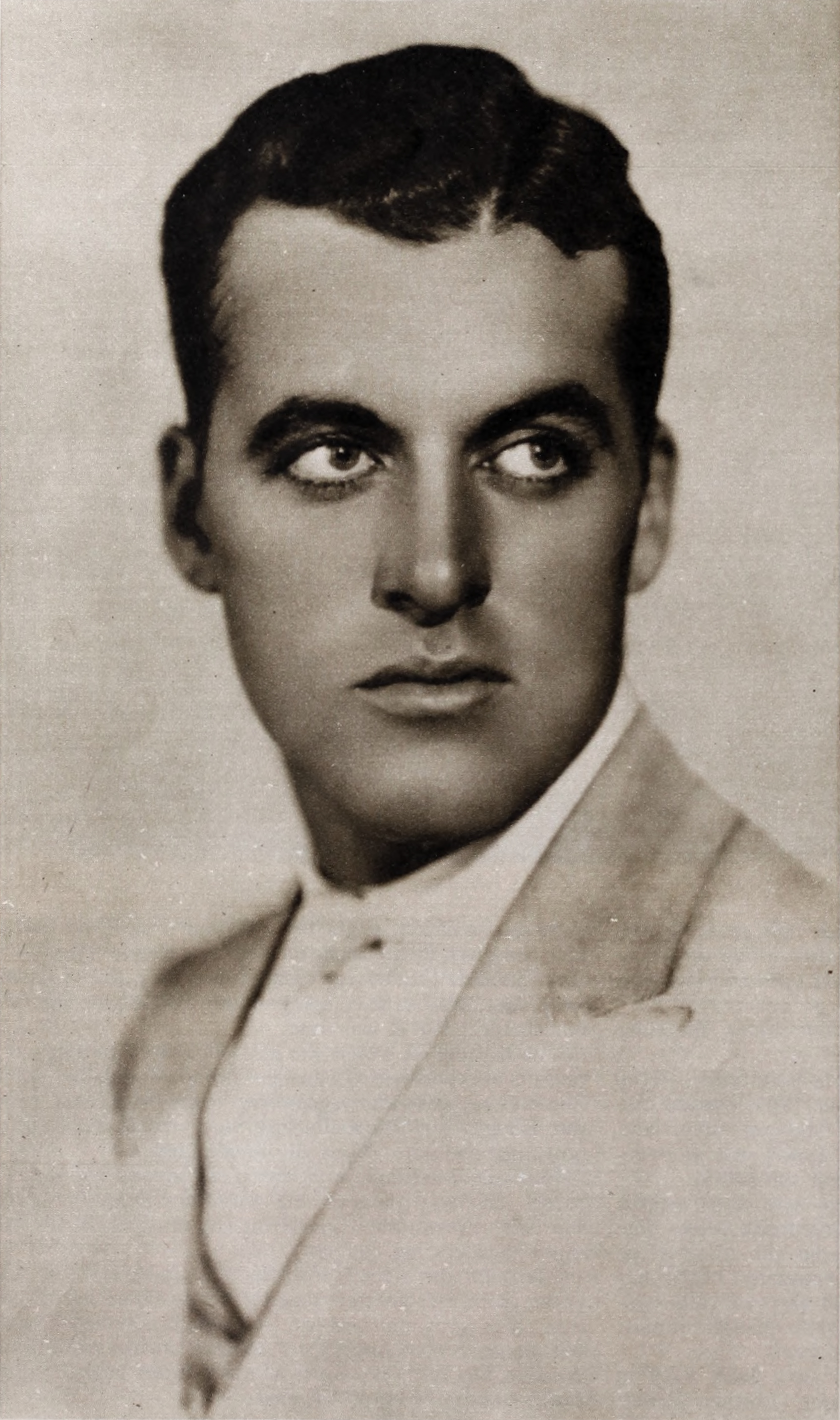
- Jarrett c. 1932

Background information
- Born: Arthur L. Jarrett Jr. July 20, 1907; Brooklyn, New York, U.S.
- Died: July 23, 1987 (aged 80) Los Angeles, California, U.S.
- Occupations: Singer, actor, and bandleader
- Labels: Victor; Brunswick

Art Jarrett in Popular Melodies (1933)

Arthur L. Jarrett Jr. (July 20, 1907 – July 23, 1987) was an American singer, bandleader and actor during the 1930s and 1940s. He was the son of stage actor and playwright Arthur L. Jarrett Sr. (1884–1960).

== Early career ==
Near the end of the 1920s into the 1930s, Jarrett was a member of the dance orchestras of Earl Burtnett, Ted Weems, Jimmie Noone, and Red Nichols, playing banjo, guitar, and trombone as well as singing. He recorded for Victor and Brunswick. He also recorded a handful of vocals for Isham Jones in 1931. His high tenor voice made him popular in feature films and shorts. He had a record year in 1933, introducing such songs as "Everything I Have is Yours" from Dancing Lady, "Did You Ever See a Dream Walking?" from Sitting Pretty, and "Let's Fall in Love" from the movie of the same name.

Jarrett also performed in vaudeville.

== Bandleader ==
In 1936, he left Ted Weems to lead his own orchestra. In 1941, he took on the leadership of Hal Kemp's orchestra following Kemp's death in an auto accident. He also appeared in the B western Trigger Pals and on Broadway in Three After Three. In 1932,

== Later career ==
In the 1950s, Jarrett was a regular on a television musical show called Rhythm Rodeo, which aired on the DuMont Television Network. Eventually, he became a disc jockey and a salesman.

== Personal life and death ==
On the afternoon of November 21, 1932, Jarrett and "shimmy" dancer Gilda Gray, who were then performing on the same bill at Boston's Metropolitan Theatre (and who, the previous evening, had each been among the guests helping Mayor James M. Curley celebrate his 58th birthday), showed up at City Hall, reportedly in hopes of both obtaining a license and getting married that day. When it became apparent that there was not enough time to obtain a waiver of the customary 5-day residency requirement, the decision was made to postpone any further efforts until the following week's show in Worcester, whose 10-day duration would, in effect, render the waiver roadblock moot.

Notwithstanding the widespread and persistent coverage this story received, beginning with the next day's Boston Globe, just one day later still, New York Daily News columnist Ed Sullivan reported in passing that the entire thwarted/postponed marriage storyline was no more than a "press agent stunt", an assertion corroborated at length by Jarrett himself on December 5 (as paraphrased by Cleveland Press radio editor Norman Siegel), wherein the allure of marrying the "once-popular hip-shifter" is likened to that of stepping into a boxing ring opposite then-heavywight champion Max Schmeling.

By the fall of 1933, both Gray and Jarrett were married, but not to each other. On September 2, Jarrett married actress and swimmer Eleanor Holm in Beverly Hills, California. They were divorced on June 9, 1938. Ironically, the final decree in Jarrett's divorce suit was granted on exactly the same day, July 9, 1939, as was that of Gray from her 1933 spouse.

On July 23, 1987, just three days after his 80th birthday, Jarrett died in Los Angeles, California, of pneumonia. He was survived by a sister.

== Filmography ==
| Year | Title | Role | Notes |
|---|---|---|---|
| 1933 | Ace of Aces | 2nd Lt. James 'Jenny' Lind | |
| 1933 | Sitting Pretty | Singer | Uncredited |
| 1933 | Dancing Lady | Himself | |
| 1933 | Let's Fall in Love | Composer | |
| 1934 | This Side of Heaven | Fraternity Member at Piano | Uncredited |
| 1934 | Riptide | Percy | |
| 1934 | Hollywood Party | Singer of 'Feelin' High' | Uncredited |
| 1934 | The Gay Divorcee | Vocalist | Uncredited |
| 1934 | The Gay Bride | Singer in Show | Uncredited |
| 1938 | My Lucky Star | Bill | |
| 1939 | Trigger Pals | Lucky Morgan | |
