= Anna Green (soprano) =

Anna Green (born Ann Schneider-Green, January 27, 1933) is an English soprano.

== Early life ==
The daughter of Dr. and Mrs. J. E. Schneider, Ann Schneider-Green was born in Southampton, Hampshire on January 27, 1933. She grew up in London. She was trained as a concert pianist at the Royal College of Music in London from 1951 to 1953; earning an Associate of the Royal College of Music qualification. She later began education as an operatic soprano in London in 1957 with Rodolfo Mele.

== Career ==
Multiple sources date Green's debut in Düsseldorf in 1961. However, English newspaper records indicate she was active earlier with the International Opera Group (IOG) at the Assembly Hall Theatre, Tunbridge Wells. She made her debut with the IOG in the title role of Giacomo Puccini's Tosca, and also performed with this company in The Magic Flute in 1958.

At the invitation of conductor Alberto Erede, Green made her debut in Germany with the Deutsche Oper am Rhein at the Opernhaus Düsseldorf in 1961 as Amelia in Verdi's Un ballo in maschera. In Germany she adopted the stage name Anna Green. In 1962 she portrayed Donna Anna in Don Giovanni at the Teatro Comunale di Bologna and at the Opernhaus Düsseldorf. Other roles she performed in Düsseldorf included Desdemona in Otello, Giulietta in The Tales of Hoffmann, and the title role in Ariadne auf Naxos among others.

In 1967 she gave her first performance at the Royal Opera House, Covent Garden as Hecuba in Michael Tippett's King Priam. In 1974 she portrayed Senta in The Flying Dutchman for her first appearance with the Canadian Opera Company. In 1973 Green replaced Ingrid Bjoner at the last minute as Brünnhilde in Seattle Opera's production of Wagner's Die Walküre; later returning to Seattle in 1974–1975 to sing Brünnhilde in the complete Ring cycle. She also performed Brünnhilde in Die Walküre only at the Kennedy Center with the Washington Opera Society and the National Symphony Orchestra in 1974, and in the complete Ring with the San Diego Opera in 1975. She also sang Brünnhilde in Die Walküre at Portland Opera in 1981, and at the Liceu in 1986. She also worked at the Metropolitan Opera as Birgit Nilsson's cover for Brünnhilde in the 1970s; although she never needed to step in to replace Nilsson.

In 1975 Green assailed the role of Isolde in Wagner's Tristan und Isolde for the first time at Theater Bremen. She repeated the role of Isolde many times; including at the Welsh National Opera in 1979 and at the Staatstheater Wiesbaden in 1995. At the Vienna State Opera she performed the title role in Strauss's Elektra, and at the Staatsoper Stuttgart she portrayed Kostelnička in Jenůfa. She also appeared as a guest artist at the Aalto Theatre, Badisches Staatstheater Karlsruhe (as Elektra), Cologne Opera (as Brünnhilde), Deutsche Oper Berlin (as Isolde), English National Opera (as Brünnhilde), Grand Theatre, Warsaw (as Brünnhilde), Graz Opera, the Hamburg State Opera, Maggio Musicale Fiorentino (as Brünnhilde), the Mannheim National Theatre (as Elektra and Isolde), the National Arts Centre in Ottawa, Canada, Opéra de Nice (as Brünnhilde), Staatsoper Hannover, Staatstheater Kassel, Teatro di San Carlo, and the Teatro Regio di Torino (as Isolde).

== Repertoire ==
Other roles Green performed during her career included Abigaille in Nabucco, Amelia in Simon Boccanegra, Fata Morgana in The Love for Three Oranges, Goneril in Lear, Leonore in Fidelio, Lucrezia Contarini in I due Foscari, Marie in Wozzeck, the Marschallin in Der Rosenkavalier, Marta in Tiefland, the Mother in Il prigioniero, Santuzza in Cavalleria rusticana, Ursula in Mathis der Maler, and the title roles in Aida and Euryanthe. She was also had an active career on the concert stage, particularly in Germany; most often performing in works by contemporary composers.

== Personal life ==
In 1965 she married tenor Howard Vandenburg.
