= Stage Mother (1933 film) =

1933 film by Charles Brabin

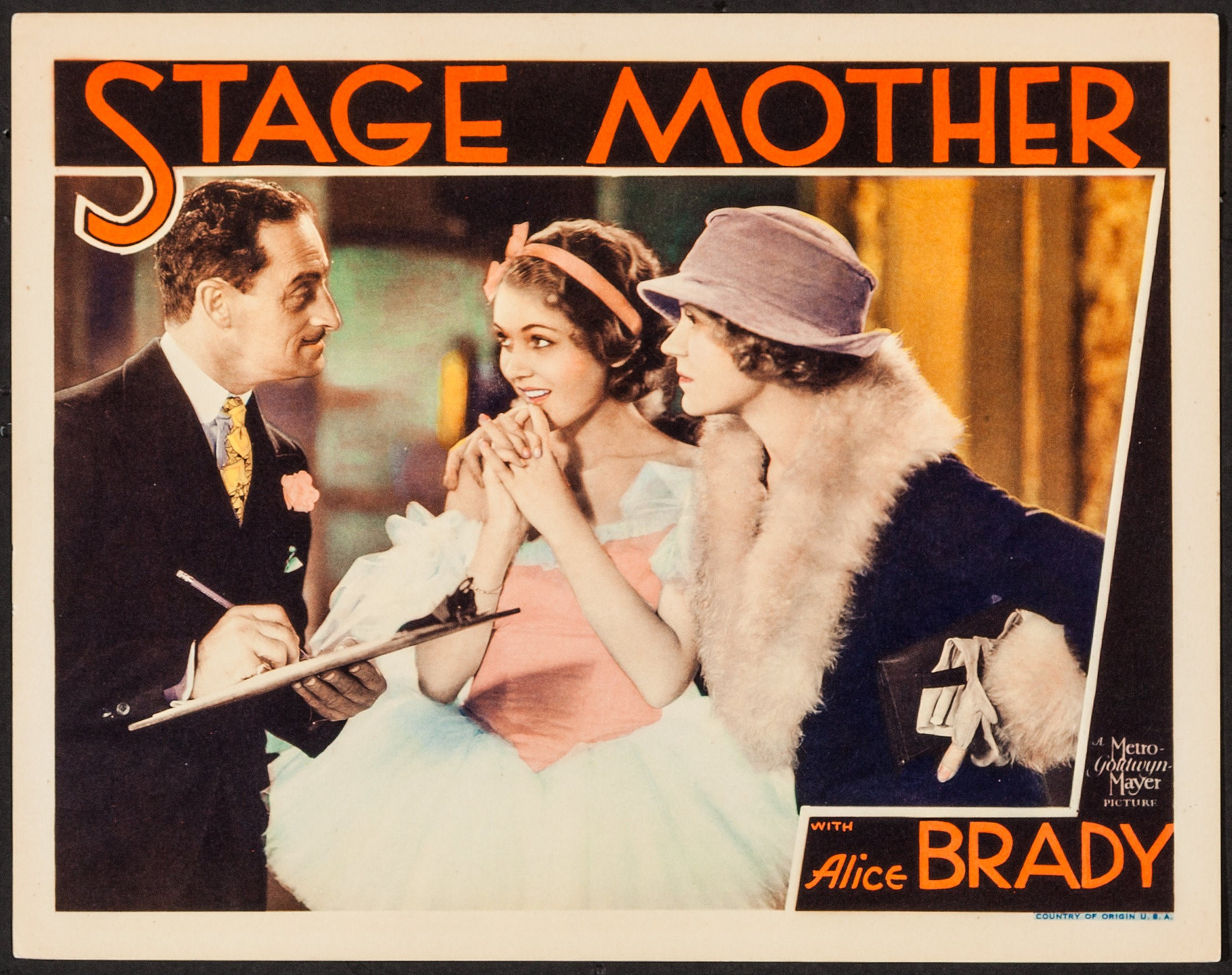
- 1933 Lobby Card
- Directed by: Charles Brabin
- Screenplay by: John Meehan; Bradford Ropes
- Based on: Stage Mother (1933 novel) by Bradford Ropes
- Produced by: Hunt Stromberg
- Starring: Alice Brady; Maureen O'Sullivan
- Cinematography: George J. Folsey
- Edited by: Frank E. Hull
- Music by: Arthur Freed; Nacio Herb Brown; Fred Fisher
- Production company: Metro-Goldwyn-Mayer
- Distributed by: Metro-Goldwyn-Mayer; Loew's
- Release date: September 29, 1933
- Running time: 85 minutes
- Country: United States
- Language: English

Stage Mother is a 1933 American pre-Code drama film directed by Charles Brabin and starring Alice Brady and Maureen O'Sullivan. The film is about a frustrated vaudeville performer who pushes her daughter into becoming a star dancer; selfishness, deceit and blackmail drive mother and daughter apart until a reconciliation at the end of the film. The screenplay was written by John Meehan and Bradford Ropes, based on the 1933 novel of the same name by Ropes.

== Plot ==
Four years after her vaudevillian husband's death, Kitty Lorraine, a frustrated former performer, marries comic Ralph Martin and returns to the stage, leaving behind her four-year-old daughter Shirley with her former in-laws. Fed up after ten years of Ralph's drinking, Kitty divorces him and sends for her now 14-year-old daughter. Two years of training allows Shirley to land a featured role in a touring music revue. Upon Shirley's return to New York City, Kitty blackmails the revue's manager into breaking Shirley's contract so she can take the starring role in a Broadway revue.

During tryouts in Boston, Shirley returns to her family home and meets Warren Foster, an artist now living there. She takes advantage of her mother's sudden illness to continue seeing Warren, eventually staying the night with him. When Kitty intercepts a love letter from Warren to Shirley, she blackmails Warren's parents for $10,000. Warren angrily denounces Shirley.

Shirley next takes up with Al Dexter, a candidate for mayor. When his political operatives get wind of the relationship they pay Kitty $25,000 to sail with Shirley to Europe. On board ship, Shirley meets Lord Reggie Aylesworth. Worried that the class-conscious Reggie will abandon her, Shirley denies that Kitty is her mother, claiming she is merely a stage mother. Reggie proposes and Shirley accepts, blithely informing Kitty both of the lie and that she will not be welcomed in her new home. A contrite Kitty hands over another intercepted love letter from Warren and gives Shirley her blessing for a happy life.

== Cast ==
- Alice Brady as Katherine 'Kitty' Lorraine
- Maureen O'Sullivan as Shirley Lorraine
- Franchot Tone as Warren Foster
- Phillips Holmes as Lord Reggie Aylesworth
- Ted Healy as Ralph Martin
- Russell Hardie as Frederick 'Fred' Lorraine
- C. Henry Gordon as Ricco
- Alan Edwards as Al Dexter
- Ben Alexander as Francis Nolan
- Lowden Adams as Dexter's Butler
- Luis Alberni as Hors D'Oeuvres Waiter
- Sam Ash as Mr. Mark Thorne
- Hank Bell as Mustached Man With Badge
- Margaret Bert as Nurse
- Nora Cecil as Miss Gilford - Kitty's Music Store Boss
- Elspeth Dudgeon as Music Store Customer
- Jay Eaton as Mr. Sterling the Dance Instructor
- Bill Elliott as Audience Member / Dexter's Party Guest
- John Elliott as Politician
- Larry Fine as Music Department customer
- Bud Geary as Orderly
- Ruth Gillette as Blonde
- June Gittelson as Laughing Fat Woman
- Harrison Greene as Stage Manager
- Lillian Harmer as Fred's Mother
- Aggie Herring as The Landlady
- Harry Holman as Mr. Rumley
- Mary Ann Jackson as Auditioning Child Dancer
- Gladden James as Audience Member
- Lew Kelly as Jake - Stagehand
- Alice Lake as Audience Member
- John Larkin as The Porter
- Buddy Messinger as Fellow in Third Row
- Greta Meyer as Dancing Girl's Mother
- Bert Moorhouse as Navy Officer
- Edmund Mortimer as Shipboard Extra / Audience Extra
- Frank O'Connor as Man at Gangplank
- Garry Owen as Jerry - Stagehand
- Bradley Page as Tom Banton
- Shirley Jean Rickert as Shirley Lorraine as a child
- Tom Ricketts as Fred's Father
- Henry Roquemore as Messenger
- Phillips Smalley as Music Store Manager
- Larry Steers as Dexter's Party Guest
- Carl Stockdale as Stagehand
- Carl Switzer as 'Irish Eyes' singer
- Guy Usher as Theater Owner
- Leo White as Percy - Audition Manager
- Beal Wong as Stage Extra
- Tammany Young as Taxi Driver

== Production ==
Image from the original theatrical trailer

Stage Mother was based on the novel of the same name by Bradford Ropes, whose earlier book 42nd Street had been adapted into the successful 1933 film. Larry Fine, one of the performers from the iconic American vaudeville and comedy troupe, The Three Stooges, makes an appearance in the film as a music store customer.

The film includes the songs "Beautiful Girl" and "I'm Dancing on a Rainbow" with words and music by Nacio Herb Brown and Arthur Freed, and "Any Little Girl, That's a Nice Little Girl, Is the Right Little Girl for Me" with words and music by Fred Fisher.

== Reception ==
Film critic Mordaunt Hall wrote "it is chiefly through Miss Brady's competent performance and Charles Brabin's experienced direction that this production succeeds in being infinitely more acceptable than most others of its type." Film historian Richard Barrios observed that the character of Mr. Sterling, Shirley's dance instructor, typifies the motion picture homosexual. Posing with hands on hips, Sterling lisps his way through his scene with Kitty and Shirley and even exchanges dialogue with Kitty implying that she will fix him up with other men in the theatre.

Critic Ruth Waterbury stated "Alice Brady proves she can tear at your heart strings as well as make you laugh; Franchot Tone is worthy of a much better and bigger part; Maureen O'Sullivan is the real surprise of the picture, for the first time in her career, this little colleen acts like her heart and soul are really in her work." Billboard Magazine wrote this film "is one of the finest pieces of box-office material that has come to our view in many moons; it is made very human by the legitimate, frank and able handling which the direction gives; the performance of Miss Brady is one of the finest in screen history; the picture is full of music, action, life and interesting stage stuff that can be calculated to please."

Leonard Maltin opined that "Brady is wonderful, and so is seedy backstage atmosphere; songs include "Beautiful Girl", later immortalized in Singin' in the Rain. The Los Angeles Evening Record said "it's a grand yarn, played to the hilt by Brady and O'Sullivan; you'll wait a long time before you see better performances than these two give; this is good, reliable entertainment; a human story, adequately played, and embellished by one or two ballet-numbers that will give you a tingle."
