= Heat Wave (Irving Berlin song) =

1933 song sung by Ethel Waters

Song by Ethel Waters
- Written: 1933
- Songwriter: Irving Berlin

"Heat Wave" is a popular song written by Irving Berlin for the 1933 musical As Thousands Cheer, and introduced in the show by Ethel Waters.

== Film appearances ==
- 1938: The song was featured in the film Alexander's Ragtime Band, where it was performed by Ethel Merman.
- 1946: It was also featured in the film Blue Skies, where it was performed by Olga San Juan.
- 1954: There's No Business Like Show Business, where it was performed by Marilyn Monroe. (Note: based on the lyrics alone, the Marilyn song is different, and within the film's narrative, Monroe's version is a sexier variant of the original that's "stolen" from Ethel Merman's character).
- 1954: A snippet of the song can be heard in a medley in the film White Christmas, sung by Bing Crosby and Danny Kaye.
- 1981: Miss Piggy sings it in The Muppets Go to the Movies.
- 1993: A snippet of the song can be heard in the film Grumpy Old Men, sung by Ella Fitzgerald.

== Notable recordings ==
There were three chart hits in 1933 by:

- Ethel Waters
- Glen Gray and the Casa Loma Orchestra – vocal by Mildred Bailey
- Meyer Davis – vocal by Charlotte Murray.

=== Other versions ===
- 1934: Sol K. Bright & His Hollywaiians
- 1952: Lee Wiley on the album Lee Wiley Sings Irving Berlin.
- 1955: Margaret Whiting for Capitol Records CL14242.
- 1956: Bing Crosby recorded the song on his album Bing Sings Whilst Bregman Swings.
- 1958: Ella Fitzgerald sang the song on her album Ella Fitzgerald Sings the Irving Berlin Songbook.
- 1961: Enoch Light gave a symphonic treatment of the song, which can be found on the album Stereo 35-MM.
- 1975: Bing Crosby on his 1975 album At My Time of Life.
- 1979: James White and the Blacks on the 1979 album Off White.
- 1995: Patti LuPone and the Hollywood Bowl Orchestra on the album Heatwave: Patti LuPone Sings Irving Berlin.
