= Dances of Galánta =

Orchestral work by Zoltán Kodály

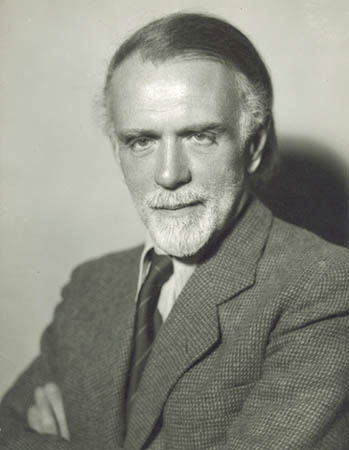
Kodály Zoltán in the 1930s

Dances of Galánta (Galántai táncok) is a 1933 orchestral work by Zoltán Kodály.

== History ==
The piece was composed on commission for the 80th anniversary of the Budapest Philharmonic Society. It is based on folk music of Galánta (Hungarian by then, now part of Slovakia), where Kodály lived for several years. The composer remarked (writing in the third person): "At that time there existed a famous Gypsy band...This was the first 'orchestral' sonority that came to the ears of the child...About 1800 some books of Hungarian dances were published in Vienna, one of which contained music 'after several Gypsies from Galánta'...the composer has taken his principal themes from these old publications". Most of the pieces used were of the verbunkos style – originally developed as military recruiting music, but generalizing to a Hungarian folk tradition in the early 1800s. Kodály saw the piece as a "sequel" to his 1927 piano suite (later orchestrated) Dances of Marosszék.

== Music ==
Dances of Galánta is in five sections, lasting a total of about 16 minutes. It is scored for two flutes, piccolo, two oboes, two clarinets in A, two bassoons, four horns, two trumpets, timpani, triangle, glockenspiel, snare drum, and string orchestra. The clarinet is particularly prominent, representing the traditional tárogató (a type of single-reed instrument).

The piece recalls the two-part slow-fast structure of the traditional verbunkos music: it opens with a slow introduction moving to a clarinet cadenza and andante maestoso section, followed by four fast dance sections. The faster sections adopt a characteristic syncopated rhythm.
