= How's Chances? =

1933 song by Irving Berlin

"How's Chances?" is a popular song written by Irving Berlin for the 1933 musical As Thousands Cheer where it was introduced by Marilyn Miller and Clifton Webb. In the musical, it is used in a sketch based on a newspaper headline "Joan Crawford to Divorce Douglas Fairbanks, Jr." with Marilyn Miller portraying Joan Crawford and Clifton Webb acting as Douglas Fairbanks Jr.

== Notable recordings ==
- Clifton Webb, with Leo Reisman's Orchestra, recorded on October 3, 1933, for Victor (No. 24418B).
- Paul Whiteman included an orchestral version on his picture disc recording for RCA-Victor (No. 39003) in 1933.
- Ella Fitzgerald - Ella Fitzgerald Sings the Irving Berlin Songbook (1958)
