= Lyric Movement =

1933 orchestral work by Gustav Holst

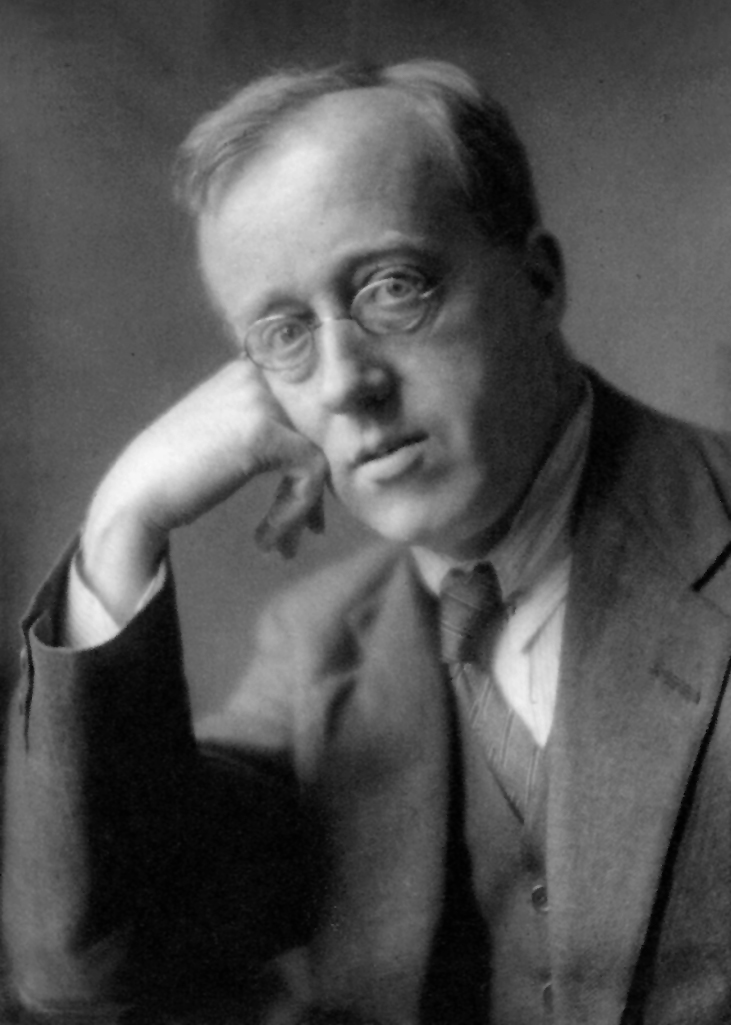
Gustav Holst ca. 1921

The Lyric Movement for viola and small orchestra (H. 191) is a short (about 10 minutes) concertante work by Gustav Holst. It was one of his last compositions, being written in 1933. It was first performed in 1934, the year of his death, by its dedicatee, the violist Lionel Tertis, and the BBC Symphony Orchestra conducted by Adrian Boult. Though its early performers found the Lyric Movement too austere for their tastes, it has more recently been considered one of Holst's most successful later works. It has been recorded several times.

== Scoring ==
The Lyric Movement is scored for viola with flute, oboe, B♭ clarinet, bassoon, and strings. There is also a reduction for viola and piano by Imogen Holst.

== Composition and first performance ==
In 1932 Holst contracted haemorrhagic gastritis caused by a duodenal ulcer, followed by periods of related ill-health which recurred at intervals for the rest of his life. Suffering from pain and weakness, he turned in 1933 to an idea he had previously had of writing something for the violist Lionel Tertis, whom he rated among the greatest of living instrumentalists. The piece was completed by 1934, and Tertis paid Holst several visits during the early weeks of that year to confer with him on details of interpretation. It was first performed in a BBC studio by Tertis with the BBC Symphony Orchestra, conducted by Adrian Boult. This was broadcast from London, and was heard by Holst on a radio Boult had set up in his sick-room. Holst congratulated Tertis on a performance he considered perfect, a judgement which his daughter Imogen many years later endorsed.

== Reception ==
In 1949 Bernard Shore recalled that the Lyric Movement's initial performers had found it "bare, impersonal music, terribly aloof", but he asserted that it had since become "appreciated as a cherished gift to the viola player". In part, its continuing rehabilitation has been due to the advocacy of Imogen Holst, who considered that it was one of her father's best works. She found in it an ardour, ease, passion and spontaneity which recalled the music of his earlier years. Diana McVeagh wrote in 1967 that it was a "real find...a bigger, stronger, darker conception than the title suggests. It...is economical but not self-denying. There is more than a hint of passion and vehemence". It has since become one of the best-known works of Holst's last period. Among contemporary critics, Colin Matthews believed that it "cannot fail to impress with [its] sincerity and depth of feeling – the 'tender austerity' of which he himself spoke", while Michael Short has written that it is a thoughtful, well-organized yet rhapsodic piece which displays a free, relaxed lyricism and avoids the mannerisms apparent in many of Holst's works from the previous ten years. Other critics have judged that "Holst achieves a remarkable eloquence...an authority he had been searching for all his life", and that it is "one of the most beautiful of Holst's later pieces". Stephen Barber, who thought it a "melancholy but restrained...masterpiece", believed also that "nobody now would consider this style particularly austere". Nevertheless, Leslie Wright did indeed call the Lyric Movement "rather austere", and Rob Barnett has written of its "icy endearments".

== Editions ==
Oxford University Press published a full score of the Lyric Movement in 1948, a reduction for viola and piano by Imogen Holst in 1971, and a revised edition of the full score in 1986. A facsimile edition by Imogen Holst and Colin Matthews of Holst's original manuscript was published by Faber Music in 1977.

== Recordings ==
- Cecil Aronowitz (viola), English Chamber Orchestra, cond. Imogen Holst (1967). Gustav Holst: Lyric Movement, Brook Green Suite, Nocturne, A Fugal Concerto, St. Paul's Suite (LP). Lyrita. SRCS 34.
- Ronald Golan (viola), MIT Symphony Orchestra, cond. David Epstein (1987). Works for Viola and Orchestra (CD). Pantheon. D 0981 X.
- New Zealand Chamber Orchestra, cond. Nicholas Braithwaite (1991). Holst: Works for Chamber Orchestra (CD). Koch. 370582 H1.
- Stephen Tees (viola), City of London Sinfonia, cond. Richard Hickox (1994). St. Paul's Suite, Brook Green Suite, Double Concerto, A Fugal Concerto, Lyric Movement, Two Songs Without Words (CD). Chandos. CHAN 9270.
- Rachel Bolt (viola), London Festival Orchestra, cond. Ross Pople (1997). Orchestral Works: Gustav Holst (CD). Arte Nova. 74321 34022 2.
- Timothy Pooley (viola), Hallé Orchestra, cond. Mark Elder (2001). Gustav Holst: The Planets. Colin Matthews: Pluto (CD). Hyperion. CDA67270.
- Sarah-Jane Bradley (viola), Orchestra Nova of London, cond. George Vass (2007). British Viola Music (CD). Dutton. CDLX 7186.
- Andriy Viytovych (viola), English Sinfonia, cond. Howard Griffiths (2007). Holst: Double Concerto, St Paul's Suite, Brook Green Suite (CD). Naxos. 8.570339.
