= Sitting Pretty (1933 film) =

1933 film

- Directed by: Harry Joe Brown
- Written by: Lou Breslow; Jack McGowan; S. J. Perelman; Nina Wilcox Putnam (story); Harry Stoddard (story, uncredited)
- Produced by: Charles R. Rogers
- Starring: Jack Oakie; Jack Haley; Ginger Rogers; Thelma Todd
- Distributed by: Paramount Pictures
- Release date: November 24, 1933
- Running time: 85 minutes
- Country: United States
- Language: English

Sitting Pretty is a 1933 American Pre-Code musical comedy film that tells the story of two aspiring but untalented songwriters played by Jack Oakie and Jack Haley. They are joined by Ginger Rogers and Thelma Todd on their trip from New York City to Hollywood to find their fortune. This film was directed by Harry Joe Brown and featured the Pickens Sisters as themselves.

== Cast ==
- Jack Oakie as Chick Parker
- Jack Haley as Pete Pendleton
- Ginger Rogers as Dorothy
- Gregory Ratoff as Tannenbaum
- Thelma Todd as Gloria Duval
- Lew Cody as Jules Clark
- Jerry Tucker as Buzz
- The Pickens Sisters
- The Hundred Hollywood Honeys
- Hale Hamilton as Vinton
- Walter Walker as George Wilson
- Kenneth Thomson as Norman Lubin
- William Davidson as Director
- Lee Morgan as Assistant director
- Harry Revel as Pianist
- Mack Gordon as Song publisher
- Arthur Jarrett
- Virginia Sale
