= AFI's 100 Years...100 Stars =

List of legends of American film history

AFI 100 Years... series
- 1998: 100 Movies
- 1999: 100 Stars
- 2000: 100 Laughs
- 2001: 100 Thrills
- 2002: 100 Passions
- 2003: 100 Heroes & Villains
- 2004: 100 Songs
- 2005: 100 Movie Quotes
- 2005: 25 Scores
- 2006: 100 Cheers
- 2006: 25 Musicals
- 2007: 100 Movies (Updated)
- 2008: AFI's 10 Top 10

AFI's 100 Years...100 Stars is the American Film Institute's list ranking the top 25 male and 25 female greatest screen legends of American film history and is the second list of the AFI 100 Years... series.

The list was unveiled through a CBS special on June 15, 1999, hosted by Shirley Temple (who is herself honored on the female legends list), with 50 then-current actors making the presentations.

AFI defines an "American screen legend" as "an actor or a team of actors with a significant screen presence in American feature-length films (films of 40 minutes or more) whose screen debut occurred in or before 1950, or whose screen debut occurred after 1950 but whose death has marked a completed body of work." Jurors selected the final lists from 250 male and 250 female nominees.

When the lists were unveiled, Gregory Peck, Katharine Hepburn, Marlon Brando, Elizabeth Taylor, Shirley Temple, Lauren Bacall, Kirk Douglas and Sidney Poitier were alive, but have since died. As of 2026, at age 92, Sophia Loren is the sole surviving star.

== The AFI's 50 greatest screen legends ==
No.	Female legends	Male legends
1	Katharine Hepburn (May 12, 1907 – June 29, 2003)	Humphrey Bogart (December 25, 1899 – January 14, 1957)
2	Bette Davis (April 5, 1908 – October 6, 1989)	Cary Grant (January 18, 1904 – November 29, 1986)
3	Audrey Hepburn (May 4, 1929 – January 20, 1993)	James Stewart (May 20, 1908 – July 2, 1997)
4	Ingrid Bergman (August 29, 1915 – August 29, 1982)	Marlon Brando (April 3, 1924 – July 1, 2004)
5	Greta Garbo (September 18, 1905 – April 15, 1990)	Fred Astaire (May 10, 1899 – June 22, 1987)
6	Marilyn Monroe (June 1, 1926 – August 4, 1962)	Henry Fonda (May 16, 1905 – August 12, 1982)
7	Elizabeth Taylor (February 27, 1932 – March 23, 2011)	Clark Gable (February 1, 1901 – November 16, 1960)
8	Judy Garland (June 10, 1922 – June 22, 1969)	James Cagney (July 17, 1899 – March 30, 1986)
9	Marlene Dietrich (December 27, 1901 – May 6, 1992)	Spencer Tracy (April 5, 1900 – June 10, 1967)
10	Joan Crawford (March 23, 1904-08 (Note: Either 1904, 1905, 1906, or 1908, according to various sources (see biographical entry).) – May 10, 1977)	Charlie Chaplin (April 16, 1889 – December 25, 1977)
11	Barbara Stanwyck (July 16, 1907 – January 20, 1990)	Gary Cooper (May 7, 1901 – May 13, 1961)
12	Claudette Colbert (September 13, 1903 – July 30, 1996)	Gregory Peck (April 5, 1916 – June 12, 2003)
13	Grace Kelly (November 12, 1929 – September 14, 1982)	John Wayne (May 26, 1907 – June 11, 1979)
14	Ginger Rogers (July 16, 1911 – April 25, 1995)	Laurence Olivier (May 22, 1907 – July 11, 1989)
15	Mae West (August 17, 1893 – November 22, 1980)	Gene Kelly (August 23, 1912 – February 2, 1996)
16	Vivien Leigh (November 5, 1913 – July 8, 1967)	Orson Welles (May 6, 1915 – October 10, 1985)
17	Lillian Gish (October 14, 1893 – February 27, 1993)	Kirk Douglas (December 9, 1916 – February 5, 2020)
18	Shirley Temple (April 23, 1928 – February 10, 2014)	James Dean (February 8, 1931 – September 30, 1955)
19	Rita Hayworth (October 17, 1918 – May 14, 1987)	Burt Lancaster (November 2, 1913 – October 20, 1994)
20	Lauren Bacall (September 16, 1924 – August 12, 2014)	Marx Brothers: Chico (March 22, 1887 – October 11, 1961); Harpo (November 23, 1888 – September 28, 1964); Groucho (October 2, 1890 – August 19, 1977); Zeppo (February 25, 1901 – November 30, 1979)
21	Sophia Loren (born September 20, 1934)	Buster Keaton (October 4, 1895 – February 1, 1966)
22	Jean Harlow (March 3, 1911 – June 7, 1937)	Sidney Poitier (February 20, 1927 – January 6, 2022)
23	Carole Lombard (October 6, 1908 – January 16, 1942)	Robert Mitchum (August 6, 1917 – July 1, 1997)
24	Mary Pickford (April 8, 1892 – May 29, 1979)	Edward G. Robinson (December 12, 1893 – January 26, 1973)
25	Ava Gardner (December 24, 1922 – January 25, 1990)	William Holden (April 17, 1918 – November 12, 1981)

== Nominees ==
The legends were chosen out of a list of 250 male and 250 female nominees. The adjoining reference gives the lists of the original selection.

With the death of Sidney Poitier in January 2022, all male living legends and nominees have now died. There is one surviving female living legend, Sophia Loren (92), and 3 remaining female nominees: Claire Bloom (95), Rita Moreno (94) and Margaret O'Brien (89). The most recent nominee to die is Ann Blyth, aged 98, in June 2026.

=== The 250 male nominees ===
The actors that are part of the complete list of nominees are:

- Abbott and Costello
  - Bud Abbott (1897–1974)
  - Lou Costello (1906–1959)
- Brian Aherne (1902–1986)
- Don Ameche (1908–1993)
- Eddie "Rochester" Anderson (1905–1977)
- Broncho Billy Anderson (1880–1971)
- Dana Andrews (1909–1992)
- Roscoe "Fatty" Arbuckle (1887–1933)
- George Arliss (1868–1946)
- Louis Armstrong (1901–1971)
- Edward Arnold (1890–1956)
- Gene Autry (1907–1998)
- Lew Ayres (1908–1996)
- King Baggot (1879–1948)
- John Barrymore (1882–1942)
- Lionel Barrymore (1878–1954)
- Richard Barthelmess (1895–1963)
- Freddie Bartholomew (1924–1992)
- Warner Baxter (1889–1951)
- Noah Beery (1882–1946)
- Wallace Beery (1885–1949)
- Ralph Bellamy (1904–1991)
- John Belushi (1949–1982)
- William Bendix (1906–1964)
- Jack Benny (1894–1974)
- Edgar Bergen (1903–1978) and Charlie McCarthy
- Milton Berle (1908–2002)
- Ray Bolger (1904–1987)
- Ward Bond (1903–1960)
- William Boyd (1895–1972)
- Charles Boyer (1899–1978)
- Eddie Bracken (1915–2002)
- Walter Brennan (1894–1974)
- Lloyd Bridges (1913–1998)
- Joe E. Brown (1891–1973)
- Yul Brynner (1920–1985)
- George Burns (1896–1996)
- Richard Burton (1925–1984)
- Francis X. Bushman (1883–1966)
- Eddie Cantor (1892–1964)
- John Carradine (1906–1988)
- Leo G. Carroll (1886–1972)
- Jack Carson (1910–1963)
- John Cassavetes (1929–1989)
- Lon Chaney (1883–1930)
- Lon Chaney Jr. (1906–1973)
- Maurice Chevalier (1888–1972)
- Montgomery Clift (1920–1966)
- Lee J. Cobb (1911–1976)
- Charles Coburn (1877–1961)
- Ronald Colman (1891–1958)
- Jackie Coogan (1914–1984)
- Jackie Cooper (1922–2011)
- Joseph Cotten (1905–1994)
- Buster Crabbe (1908–1983)
- Broderick Crawford (1911–1986)
- Hume Cronyn (1911–2003)
- Bing Crosby (1903–1977)
- Robert Cummings (1910–1990)
- Tony Curtis (1925–2010)
- Dan Dailey (1915–1978)
- Ossie Davis (1917–2005)
- Sammy Davis Jr. (1925–1990)
- Divine (1945–1988)
- Richard Dix (1893–1949)
- Robert Donat (1905–1958)
- Brian Donlevy (1901–1972)
- Melvyn Douglas (1901–1981)
- Jimmy Durante (1893–1980)
- Buddy Ebsen (1908–2003)
- Nelson Eddy (1901–1967)
- Douglas Fairbanks (1883–1939)
- Douglas Fairbanks Jr. (1909–2000)
- William Farnum (1876–1953)
- José Ferrer (1912–1992)
- W. C. Fields (1880–1946)
- Peter Finch (1916–1977)
- Barry Fitzgerald (1888–1961)
- Errol Flynn (1909–1959)
- Glenn Ford (1916–2006)
- John Garfield (1913–1952)
- John Gielgud (1904–2000)
- John Gilbert (1897–1936)
- Jackie Gleason (1916–1987)
- Farley Granger (1925–2011)
- Stewart Granger (1913–1993)
- Sydney Greenstreet (1879–1954)
- Sir Alec Guinness (1914–2000)
- Edmund Gwenn (1877–1959)
- Jack Haley (1898–1979)
- Rex Harrison (1908–1990)
- William S. Hart (1864–1946)
- Laurence Harvey (1928–1973)
- Sessue Hayakawa (1886–1973)
- Sterling Hayden (1916–1986)
- George "Gabby" Hayes (1885–1969)
- Van Heflin (1908–1971)
- Paul Henreid (1908–1992)
- Charlton Heston (1923–2008)
- Bob Hope (1903–2003)
- Edward Everett Horton (1886–1970)
- John Houseman (1902–1988)
- Leslie Howard (1893–1943)
- Trevor Howard (1913–1988)
- Rock Hudson (1925–1985)
- Tab Hunter (1931–2018)
- John Huston (1906–1987)
- Walter Huston (1883–1950)
- Rex Ingram (1895–1969)
- Burl Ives (1909–1995)
- Emil Jannings (1884–1950)
- Ben Johnson (1918–1996)
- Van Johnson (1916–2008)
- Al Jolson (1886–1950)
- Louis Jourdan (1921–2015)
- Raul Julia (1940–1994)
- Boris Karloff (1887–1969)
- Danny Kaye (1911–1987)
- Howard Keel (1919–2004)
- Arthur Kennedy (1914–1990)
- Alan Ladd (1913–1964)
- Bert Lahr (1895–1967)
- Harry Langdon (1884–1944)
- Mario Lanza (1921–1959)
- Charles Laughton (1899–1962)
- Laurel and Hardy
  - Stan Laurel (1890–1965)
  - Oliver Hardy (1892–1957)
- Peter Lawford (1923–1984)
- Oscar Levant (1906–1972)
- Jerry Lewis (1926–2017)
- Harold Lloyd (1893–1971)
- Peter Lorre (1904–1964)
- Bela Lugosi (1882–1956)
- Keye Luke (1904–1991)
- Fred MacMurray (1908–1991)
- Gordon MacRae (1921–1986)
- Karl Malden (1912–2009)
- Fredric March (1897–1975)
- Herbert Marshall (1890–1966)
- Dean Martin (1917–1995)
- Lee Marvin (1924–1987)
- James Mason (1909–1984)
- Raymond Massey (1896–1983)
- Victor Mature (1913–1999)
- Joel McCrea (1905–1990)
- Roddy McDowall (1928–1998)
- Victor McLaglen (1886–1959)
- Steve McQueen (1930–1980)
- Adolphe Menjou (1890–1963)
- Burgess Meredith (1907–1997)
- Ray Milland (1907–1986)
- Sal Mineo (1939–1976)
- Thomas Mitchell (1892–1962)
- Tom Mix (1880–1940)
- Ricardo Montalbán (1920–2009)
- George Montgomery (1916–2000)
- Robert Montgomery (1904–1981)
- Mantan Moreland (1902–1973)
- Frank Morgan (1890–1949)
- Zero Mostel (1915–1977)
- Paul Muni (1895–1967)
- George Murphy (1902–1992)
- The Nicholas Brothers
  - Fayard Nicholas (1914–2006)
  - Harold Nicholas (1921–2000)
- David Niven (1910–1983)
- Ramon Novarro (1899–1968)
- Jack Oakie (1903–1978)
- Edmond O'Brien (1915–1985)
- Pat O'Brien (1899–1983)
- Donald O'Connor (1925–2003)
- Jack Palance (1919–2006)
- Larry Parks (1914–1975)
- George Peppard (1928–1994)
- Anthony Perkins (1932–1992)
- Slim Pickens (1919–1983)
- Walter Pidgeon (1897–1984)
- Dick Powell (1904–1963)
- William Powell (1892–1984)
- Tyrone Power (1914–1958)
- Elvis Presley (1935–1977)
- Robert Preston (1918–1987)
- Vincent Price (1911–1993)
- Anthony Quinn (1915–2001)
- George Raft (1901–1980)
- Claude Rains (1889–1967)
- Basil Rathbone (1892–1967)
- Charles Ray (1891–1943)
- Ronald Reagan (1911–2004)
- Wallace Reid (1891–1923)
- Ralph Richardson (1902–1983)
- Paul Robeson (1898–1976)
- Bill "Bojangles" Robinson (1878–1949)
- Charles "Buddy" Rogers (1904–1999)
- Roy Rogers (1911–1998)
- Will Rogers (1879–1935)
- Gilbert Roland (1905–1994)
- Cesar Romero (1907–1994)
- Mickey Rooney (1920–2014)
- Charlie Ruggles (1886–1970)
- Harold Russell (1914–2002)
- Robert Ryan (1909–1973)
- Sabu (1924–1963)
- George Sanders (1906–1972)
- Randolph Scott (1898–1987)
- Peter Sellers (1925–1980)
- Robert Shaw (1927–1978)
- Frank Sinatra (1915–1998)
- Red Skelton (1913–1997)
- Dean Stockwell (1936–2021)
- Woody Strode (1914–1994)
- Robert Taylor (1911–1969)
- The Three Stooges
  - Larry Fine (1902–1975)
  - Curly Howard (1903–1952)
  - Moe Howard (1897–1975)
- Franchot Tone (1905–1968)
- Ben Turpin (1869–1940)
- Peter Ustinov (1921–2004)
- Rudolph Valentino (1895–1926)
- Rudy Vallée (1901–1986)
- Conrad Veidt (1893–1943)
- Erich von Stroheim (1885–1957)
- Max von Sydow (1929–2020)
- Robert Walker (1918–1951)
- Clifton Webb (1889–1966)
- Johnny Weissmuller (1904–1984)
- Richard Widmark (1914–2008)
- Cornel Wilde (1912–1989)
- Chill Wills (1902–1978)
- Gig Young (1913–1978)
- Robert Young (1907–1998)

=== The 250 female nominees ===
The actresses that are part of the complete list of nominees are:

NOTE: Those listed in bold indicate that the star is still living.

- Gracie Allen (1895–1964)
- June Allyson (1917–2006)
- Dame Judith Anderson (1897–1992)
- Annabella (1907–1996)
- Eve Arden (1908–1990)
- Jean Arthur (1900–1991)
- Mary Astor (1906–1987)
- Pearl Bailey (1918–1990)
- Lucille Ball (1911–1989)
- Tallulah Bankhead (1902–1968)
- Vilma Bánky (1901–1991)
- Theda Bara (1885–1955)
- Ethel Barrymore (1879–1959)
- Anne Baxter (1923–1985)
- Louise Beavers (1900–1962)
- Barbara Bel Geddes (1922–2005)
- Constance Bennett (1904–1965)
- Joan Bennett (1910–1990)
- Joan Blondell (1906–1979)
- **Claire Bloom** (born 1931)
- Ann Blyth (1927–2026)
- Beulah Bondi (1888–1981)
- Shirley Booth (1898–1992)
- Clara Bow (1905–1965)
- Alice Brady (1892–1939)
- Helen Broderick (1891–1959)
- Betty Bronson (1906–1971)
- Louise Brooks (1906–1985)
- Virginia Bruce (1910–1982)
- Billie Burke (1884–1970)
- Spring Byington (1886–1971)
- Kitty Carlisle (1910–2007)
- Madeleine Carroll (1906–1987)
- Cyd Charisse (1922–2008)
- Ruth Chatterton (1892–1961)
- Mae Clarke (1910–1992)
- Dolores Costello (1903–1979)
- Jeanne Crain (1925–2003)
- Viola Dana (1897–1987)
- Dorothy Dandridge (1922–1965)
- Bebe Daniels (1901–1971)
- Linda Darnell (1923–1965)
- Danielle Darrieux (1917–2017)
- Jane Darwell (1879–1967)
- Marion Davies (1897–1961)
- Joan Davis (1912–1961)
- Doris Day (1922–2019)
- Laraine Day (1920–2007)
- Yvonne De Carlo (1922–2007)
- Ruby Dee (1922–2014)
- Gloria DeHaven (1925–2016)
- Dame Olivia de Havilland (1916–2020)
- Dolores del Río (1904–1983)
- Louise Dresser (1878–1965)
- Marie Dressler (1868–1934)
- Margaret Dumont (1882–1965)
- Irene Dunne (1898–1990)
- Deanna Durbin (1921–2013)
- Jeanne Eagels (1890–1929)
- Dale Evans (1912–2001)
- Frances Farmer (1913–1970)
- Glenda Farrell (1904–1971)
- Alice Faye (1915–1998)
- Betty Field (1916–1973)
- Gracie Fields (1898–1979)
- Geraldine Fitzgerald (1913–2005)
- Rhonda Fleming (1923–2020)
- Nina Foch (1924–2008)
- Joan Fontaine (1917–2013)
- Kay Francis (1905–1968)
- Peggy Ann Garner (1932–1984)
- Betty Garrett (1919–2011)
- Greer Garson (1904–1996)
- Janet Gaynor (1906–1984)
- Mitzi Gaynor (1931–2024)
- Hermione Gingold (1897–1987)
- Dorothy Gish (1898–1968)
- Paulette Goddard (1910–1990)
- Ruth Gordon (1896–1985)
- Betty Grable (1916–1973)
- Gloria Grahame (1923–1981)
- Bonita Granville (1923–1988)
- Kathryn Grayson (1922–2010)
- Jane Greer (1924–2001)
- Corinne Griffith (1894–1979)
- Jean Hagen (1923–1977)
- Barbara Hale (1922–2017)
- Margaret Hamilton (1902–1985)
- Ann Harding (1902–1981)
- June Haver (1926–2005)
- Helen Hayes (1900–1993)
- Susan Hayward (1917–1975)
- Sonja Henie (1912–1969)
- Judy Holliday (1921–1965)
- Celeste Holm (1917–2012)
- Miriam Hopkins (1902–1972)
- Lena Horne (1917–2010)
- Marsha Hunt (1917–2022)
- Kim Hunter (1922–2002)
- Ruth Hussey (1911–2005)
- Betty Hutton (1921–2007)
- Jennifer Jones (1919–2009)
- Ruby Keeler (1909–1993)
- Madge Kennedy (1891–1987)
- Deborah Kerr (1921–2007)
- Veronica Lake (1922–1973)
- Hedy Lamarr (1914–2000)
- Dorothy Lamour (1914–1996)
- Elsa Lanchester (1902–1986)
- Priscilla Lane (1915–1995)
- Dame Angela Lansbury (1925–2022)
- Piper Laurie (1932–2023)
- Florence Lawrence (1886–1938)
- Janet Leigh (1927–2004)
- Joan Leslie (1925–2015)
- Viveca Lindfors (1920–1995)
- Gina Lollobrigida (1927–2023)
- Bessie Love (1898–1986)
- Myrna Loy (1905–1993)
- Ida Lupino (1918–1995)
- Jeanette MacDonald (1903–1965)
- Anna Magnani (1908–1973)
- Marjorie Main (1890–1975)
- Dorothy Malone (1924–2018)
- Jayne Mansfield (1933–1967)
- Mae Marsh (1894–1968)
- Mary Martin (1913–1990)
- Virginia Mayo (1920–2005)
- May McAvoy (1899–1984)
- Mercedes McCambridge (1916–2004)
- Hattie McDaniel (1893–1952)
- Dorothy McGuire (1916–2001)
- Nina Mae McKinney (1912–1967)
- Butterfly McQueen (1911–1995)
- Una Merkel (1903–1986)
- Ethel Merman (1908–1984)
- Ann Miller (1923–2004)
- Carmen Miranda (1909–1955)
- Maria Montez (1912–1951)
- Colleen Moore (1899–1988)
- Agnes Moorehead (1900–1974)
- **Rita Moreno** (born 1931)
- Mae Murray (1885–1965)
- Mildred Natwick (1905–1994)
- Alla Nazimova (1879–1945)
- Dame Anna Neagle (1904–1986)
- Patricia Neal (1926–2010)
- Pola Negri (1897–1987)
- Anna Q. Nilsson (1888–1974)
- Mabel Normand (1893–1930)
- **Margaret O'Brien** (born 1937)
- Maureen O'Hara (1920–2015)
- Maureen O'Sullivan (1911–1998)
- Merle Oberon (1911–1979)
- Seena Owen (1894–1966)
- Geraldine Page (1924–1987)
- Lilli Palmer (1914–1986)
- Eleanor Parker (1922–2013)
- Gail Patrick (1911–1980)
- ZaSu Pitts (1894–1963)
- Eleanor Powell (1912–1982)
- Jane Powell (1929–2021)
- Marie Prevost (1896–1937)
- Edna Purviance (1895–1958)
- Luise Rainer (1910–2014)
- Vera Ralston (1919–2003)
- Martha Raye (1916–1994)
- Donna Reed (1921–1986)
- Lee Remick (1935–1991)
- Anne Revere (1903–1990)
- Debbie Reynolds (1932–2016)
- Thelma Ritter (1902–1969)
- Dame Flora Robson (1902–1984)
- Ruth Roman (1922–1999)
- Gail Russell (1924–1961)
- Jane Russell (1921–2011)
- Rosalind Russell (1907–1976)
- Ann Rutherford (1917–2012)
- Lizabeth Scott (1922–2015)
- Martha Scott (1912–2003)
- Jean Seberg (1938–1979)
- Norma Shearer (1902–1983)
- Ann Sheridan (1915–1967)
- Dinah Shore (1916–1994)
- Sylvia Sidney (1910–1999)
- Jean Simmons (1929–2010)
- Simone Simon (1911–2005)
- Penny Singleton (1908–2003)
- Alexis Smith (1921–1993)
- Gale Sondergaard (1899–1985)
- Ann Sothern (1909–2001)
- Gloria Stuart (1910–2010)
- Margaret Sullavan (1909–1960)
- Gloria Swanson (1899–1983)
- Blanche Sweet (1896–1986)
- Constance Talmadge (1898–1973)
- Norma Talmadge (1894–1957)
- Jessica Tandy (1909–1994)
- Gene Tierney (1920–1991)
- Ann Todd (1907–1993)
- Thelma Todd (1906–1935)
- Claire Trevor (1910–2000)
- Lana Turner (1921–1995)
- Helen Twelvetrees (1908–1958)
- Lupe Vélez (1908–1944)
- Evelyn Venable (1913–1993)
- Vera-Ellen (1921–1981)
- Ethel Waters (1896–1977)
- Pearl White (1889–1938)
- Esther Williams (1921–2013)
- Lois Wilson (1894–1988)
- Marie Wilson (1916–1972)
- Marie Windsor (1919–2000)
- Shelley Winters (1920–2006)
- Estelle Winwood (1883–1984)
- Jane Withers (1926–2021)
- Anna May Wong (1905–1961)
- Natalie Wood (1938–1981)
- Irene Worth (1916–2002)
- Fay Wray (1907–2004)
- Teresa Wright (1918–2005)
- Jane Wyatt (1910–2006)
- Jane Wyman (1917–2007)
- Clara Kimball Young (1890–1960)
- Loretta Young (1913–2000)
