= That's Black Entertainment =

1989 film by William Greaves

- Directed by: William Greaves
- Written by: G. William Jones
- Produced by: Norm Revis Jr. David Arpin
- Distributed by: Video Communications
- Release date: 1989
- Running time: 60 minutes

That's Black Entertainment is a 1989 documentary film starring African-American performers and featuring clips from black films from 1929–1957, narrated and directed by William Greaves. The clips are from the Black Cinema Collection of the Southwest Film/Video Archives at Southern Methodist University in Dallas, Texas. It is 60 minutes long and was distributed by Video Communications of Tulsa, Oklahoma.

== Film clips included ==
The film contains more than 29 clips, including:

- Paul Robeson (in Song of Freedom)
- Bessie Smith (in St. Louis Blues)
- Eubie Blake, Nina Mae McKinney, and The Nicholas Brothers (in Pie, Pie Blackbird)
- Lena Horne (in The Duke Is Tops)
- Nat 'King' Cole and Moms Mabley (in Killer Diller)
- Sammy Davis Jr. and Ethel Waters (in Rufus Jones for President)
- Cab Calloway (in Cab Calloway's Jitterbug Party)
- Ethel Waters (in Carib Gold)

Not only musical clips were shown, but dramatic clips as well, like Murder in Harlem (1935), Juke Joint (1947), Four Shall Die (1940), and Souls of Sin (1949). The film also includes clips from white films stereotyping blacks, including D.W. Griffith's The Birth of a Nation, and a blackfaced Bing Crosby in Crooner's Holiday (1932).

== Appearances ==
- Billie Allen
- Louis Armstrong
- Albert Ammons
- Eubie Blake
- Clarence Brooks
- Cab Calloway
- Nat 'King' Cole
- Bing Crosby
- Dorothy Dandridge
- Sammy Davis Jr.
- Duke Ellington
- Francine Everett
- Stepin Fetchit
- William Greaves
- Alfred Hawkins
- Billie Holiday
- Lena Horne
- Pete Johnson
- July Jones
- Moms Mabley
- Nina Mae McKinney
- Oscar Micheaux
- Clarence Muse
- The Nicholas Brothers
- Jesse Owens
- Paul Robeson
- Bill Robinson
- Frank 'Sugar Chile' Robinson
- Bessie Smith
- Fredi Washington
- Ethel Waters
- Spencer Williams
