= 20,000 Cheers for the Chain Gang =

1933 film directed by Roy Mack

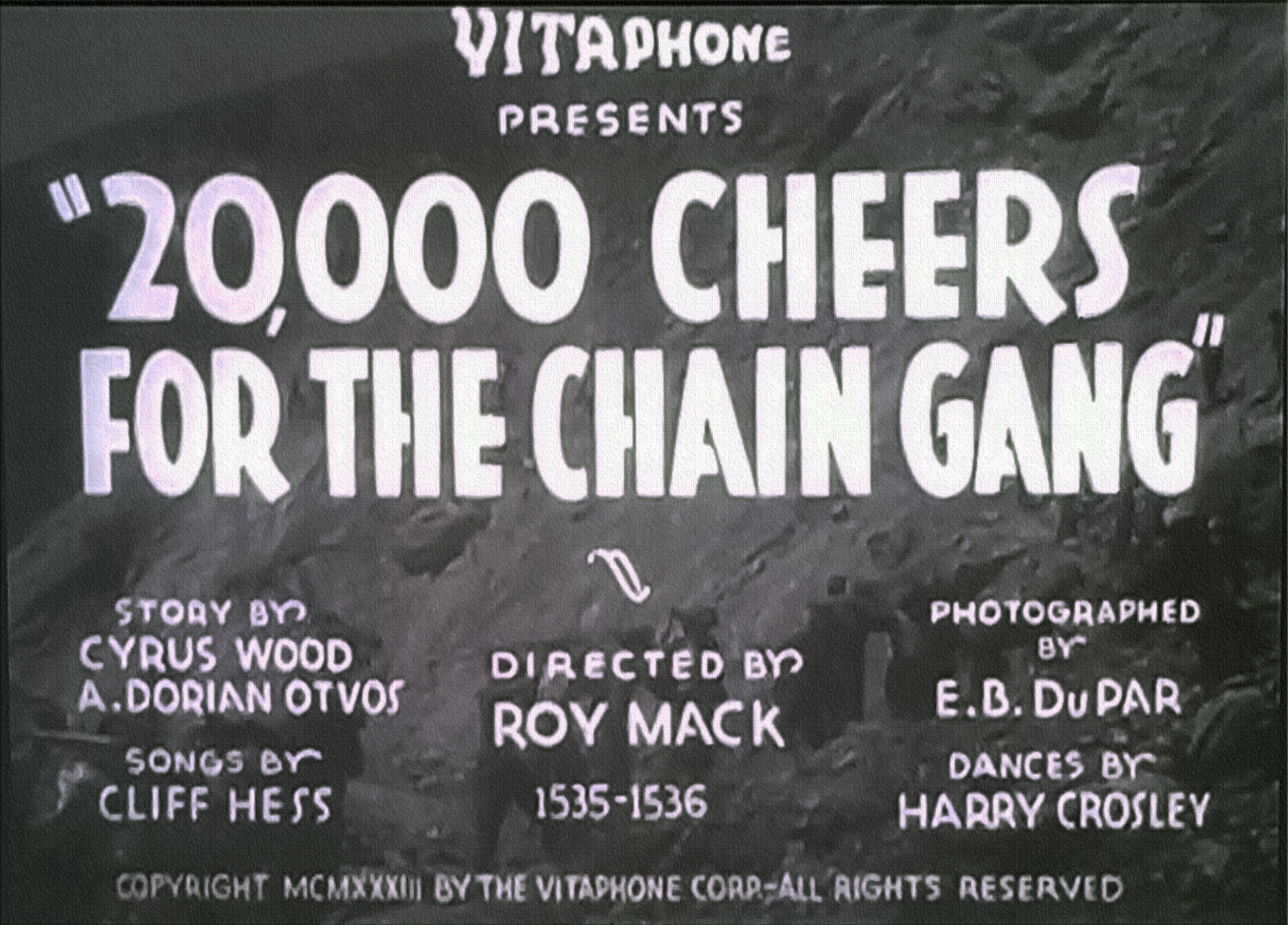
- Title card
- Directed by: Roy Mack
- Written by: A. Dorian Otvos; Cyrus Wood
- Starring: Jerry Bergen
- Cinematography: Edwin B. DuPar
- Production company: Warner Bros.
- Distributed by: Warner Bros.
- Release date: April 1933
- Running time: 19 minutes
- Country: United States
- Language: English

20,000 Cheers for the Chain Gang is an extant musical comedy film released in April 1933. The Vitaphone short was directed by Roy Mack. The 19-minute film is about escaped prisoners trying to break back into a jail where condition have improved dramatically. The film was written by A. Dorian Otvos and Cyrus Wood. It is a spoof of the 1932 film I Am a Fugitive from a Chain Gang. and 20,000 Years in Sing Sing.

Songs include "Only Thirty Years More", "Sippin' on a Soda Pop", "Good Morning to You" and "Sing Sing Serenade", all by Cliff Hess; and "Darkness in the Delta" by Marty Symes, Al J. Neiburg and Jerry Livingston.

== Plot ==
Four convicts escape from a prison chain gang shortly before changes are made for a blue ribbon commission inspection. When the escapees learn prisoners eat steak every night and have stage shows, they beg the warden to take them back in.

== Cast ==
- Jerry Bergen
- The Four Rollickers
- Harry Shannon
- Pickens Sisters
- Jimmy Baskett
- De Dios Dog Act
- Charles Herbert
