= Good Morning, Eve! =

- Directed by: Roy Mack
- Written by: Cyrus Wood; Eddie Moran; A. Dorian Otvos
- Starring: Leon Errol; June MacCloy; Vernon Dent; Maxine Doyle
- Cinematography: Ray Rennahan
- Edited by: Frank Magee
- Music by: Leo F. Forbstein
- Distributed by: Warner Bros.
- Release date: September 22, 1934
- Running time: 17 minutes
- Country: United States
- Language: English

Good Morning, Eve! is a 1934 Vitaphone short comedy film directed by Roy Mack. It was released by Warner Brothers on September 22, 1934, in the three-strip Technicolor process ("Process No. 4"). The film is one of the earliest full Technicolor productions, the first one being Mack's Service with a Smile.

== Plot ==
Adam and Eve are in the Garden of Eden debating whether to eat an apple despite the serpent's warning. After their meal, they experience time travel, apparently as part of their post-expulsion punishment. Along the way, they stop for musical interludes, including in the gardens of Emperor Nero of Rome circa 100 AD, in King Arthur's court, and at a beach resort in the modern era.

== Cast ==
- Leon Errol as Adam
- June MacCloy as Eve
- Vernon Dent as Emperor Nero
- Maxine Doyle as Queen Guinevere
