= Pie, Pie Blackbird =

1932 film

- Directed by: Roy Mack
- Written by: A. Dorian Otvos
- Starring: Nina Mae McKinney; Nicholas Brothers; Eubie Blake; Noble Sissle
- Cinematography: Edwin B. DuPar
- Music by: Eubie Blake; Noble Sissle
- Distributed by: Warner Bros.
- Release date: June 4, 1932
- Running time: 11 minutes
- Country: United States
- Language: English

Pie, Pie Blackbird is a 1932 Vitaphone pre-Code short comedy film released by Warner Bros. on June 4, 1932, starring African American performers Nina Mae McKinney, the Nicholas Brothers (in their film debut, albeit uncredited), Eubie Blake, and Noble Sissle.

McKinney and the Nicholas Brothere were reunited in another Roy Mack musical short film written by A. Dorian Otvos, The Black Network (1936).

A clip from the film is included in That's Black Entertainment (1989) and the TV special It's Black Entertainment (2002). The full film is available on DVD for Hallelujah! (1929).

== Plot summary ==
Miss Nina is in the kitchen with a huge pie in her lap. The brothers approach her but she tells them the pie isn't ready yet. “What kind of pie is it, Miss Nina?” the smaller child asks. They scoff when she tells them it's a “blackbird” pie, and she reminds them of the song she used to sing them when they were little. She puts the pie on a shelf and sings the song. On the last line, the camera zooms in on the pie, which opens to reveal the musicians, dressed as chefs, conducted by Eubie Blake. He sits down at the piano and plays a stirring classical piece, then segues into something modern. More music follows. An iris in and out reveals Miss Nina in evening dress, sitting on the piano, singing. Cut to Miss Nina and the children watching in the kitchen, then back to the pie and the band performing “I'll Be Glad When You're Dead, You Rascal, You”. Eubie Blake sings a verse. Around the pie come the boys, dressed in chef's outfits. They dance, Harold, the younger beginning with a tour de force. They compete, dancing faster and faster until steam rises and flames flash across the screen, revealing all the performers replaced by animated skeletons. The End.

== Cast ==
- Eubie Blake as Eubie Blake / Pianist
- Nina Mae McKinney as Miss Nina
- The Nicholas Brothers as Children / Dancers (uncredited)
- Fayard Nicholas as 1st Child with Nina / Dancer (uncredited) (born 1914)
- Harold Nicholas as 2nd Child with Nina / Dancer (uncredited) (born 1921)
- Noble Sissle as Noble Sissle (uncredited)

== See also ==
- Vitaphone Varieties
