= Mystery of the Wax Museum =

1933 film by Michael Curtiz

The Mystery of the Wax Museum
- Theatrical release poster
- Directed by: Michael Curtiz
- Screenplay by: Don Mullally; Carl Erickson
- Based on: "The Wax Works"; 1932 short story by Charles S. Belden
- Produced by: Henry Blanke (uncredited); Hal B. Wallis (uncredited)
- Starring: Lionel Atwill; Fay Wray; Glenda Farrell; Frank McHugh
- Cinematography: Ray Rennahan
- Edited by: George Amy
- Music by: Cliff Hess (uncredited)
- Color process: Two-strip Technicolor
- Production companies: Warner Bros. Pictures; Vitaphone
- Distributed by: Warner Bros. Pictures
- Release date: February 18, 1933 (U.S.)
- Running time: 77 minutes
- Country: United States
- Language: English
- Budget: $279,000
- Box office: $1.1 million

Mystery of the Wax Museum is a 1933 American pre-Code mystery-horror film directed by Michael Curtiz and starring Lionel Atwill, Fay Wray, Glenda Farrell, and Frank McHugh. It was produced and released by Warner Bros. Pictures and filmed in two-color Technicolor; Doctor X and Mystery of the Wax Museum were the last two dramatic fiction films made using this process.

== Plot ==
In 1921, sculptor Ivan Igor who operates a wax museum in London has financial trouble. One night, he gives a private tour to a friend, Dr. Rasmussen, and an art critic, Mr. Galatalin, showing them statues of Joan of Arc, Voltaire, and his favorite, Marie Antoinette. Impressed, Galatalin offers to submit Igor's work to the Royal Academy after he returns from a trip to Egypt. He and Rasmussen then leave. Igor's partner, Joe Worth, who is frustrated Igor will not create macabre exhibits like those that draw crowds to their competitors, proposes they burn their museum down to collect a £10,000 insurance policy. Though Igor refuses to consider this, Worth starts a fire, and the men fight while the wax masterworks melt. When Igor passes out, Worth leaves him to die in the conflagration, but he awakens.

Twelve years later in 1933, both Igor and Worth are in New York City, where a monstrous figure has been stealing bodies from the morgue. Reporter Florence Dempsey, on the verge of being fired by her impatient editor, Jim, for not bringing in any worthwhile news, gets a tip that George Winton, the son of a powerful industrialist, is being held in connection with the death of his model ex-girlfriend, Joan Gale. Florence goes to watch the autopsy, but the body cannot be found, and then visits Winton in jail, believing his protestations of innocence.

Meanwhile, Igor prepares to open a new wax museum. Due to injuries sustained in the fire, he uses a wheelchair and must rely on assistants to create his new sculptures. One of those assistants, Ralph, is engaged to Florence's roommate, Charlotte Duncan, but Florence does not approve of the match because Ralph is a starving artist. While visiting the museum, Florence notices an uncanny resemblance between the wax figure of Joan of Arc and Joan Gale. At the same time, Igor spots Charlotte and, saying she looks just like his Marie Antoinette, asks if she will pose for him sometime.

Florence gets Winton, who was released from jail, to help her trail Professor Darcy, who Igor said made the Joan of Arc. Darcy leads them to a derelict building owned by Worth, for whom he also works. Florence sneaks into the basement and watches the monster from the morgue pushing a large crate. She returns to Winton and interrupts a conversation with two detectives who have been following him to say she has found Joan Gale's body. The detectives see Darcy leaving and call for help to both give chase and investigate Florence's claim. They catch Darcy, but the crate turns out to contain alcohol, as Worth is a bootlegger.

At the police station, a missing judge's pocket watch is found on Darcy. By the morning, he is experiencing symptoms of drug withdrawal and close to cracking. Meanwhile, Charlotte goes to see Ralph at the museum, but he is not there yet. Igor lures her to his underground laboratory and reveals he can walk. Ralph arrives for work and lets in Florence, who compares a picture of the missing judge with Igor's statue of Voltaire at the same time Darcy is telling the detectives that Igor made his new statues by murdering people and covering them in wax, while all he did for Igor was locate Worth.

Charlotte strikes Igor's face and breaks through a wax mask to his scarred true visage underneath, revealing he is the monstrous bodysnatcher. He uncovers Worth's corpse, saying his search for the man responsible for his appearance is finally over. Charlotte's screams attract Ralph and Florence, but Igor knocks Ralph unconscious and Florence runs away. Igor prepares to douse Charlotte with wax. Florence and Winton return, followed by police, who attack an athletic Igor. One officer shoots Igor, who falls into his vat of molten wax. Ralph comes to and saves Charlotte just before the wax begins to pour onto her.

After turning in her story, Florence goes to gloat to Jim, who asks her to marry him. She looks out the window at the waiting Winton and accepts the proposal.

== Cast ==
- Glenda Farrell as Florence Dempsey, a reporter
- Fay Wray as Charlotte Duncan, Ralph's fiancée, and as the Marie Antoinette statue
- Lionel Atwill as Ivan Igor, a sculptor
- Frank McHugh as Jim, Florence's editor
- Allen Vincent as Ralph Burton, Charlotte's fiancé and Igor's assistant sculptor
- Gavin Gordon as George Winton, Joan Gale's ex-boyfriend
- Edwin Maxwell as Joe Worth, the co-owner of Igor's London museum
- Holmes Herbert as Dr. Rasmussen, Igor's friend in London
- Claude King as Mr. Galatalin, a distinguished London art critic
- Arthur Edmund Carewe as Sparrow/Professor Darcy, Igor and Worth's flunky in New York, who is addicted to heroin
- Thomas Jackson as the detective at the morgue
- DeWitt Jennings as the police captain
- Matthew Betz as Hugo, Igor's assistant sculptor, who is deaf
- Monica Bannister as Joan Gale and the Joan of Arc statue
- James Donlan as the senior morgue attendant (uncredited)
- William Wagner as the junior morgue attendant (uncredited)
- Lon Poff as Worth's tall, thin henchman (uncredited)
- Robert O'Connor as Joe, the police officer who tells Dempsey that Winton is suspected of murdering Joan Gale (uncredited)
- Frank Darien as the autopsy surgeon (uncredited)
- Wallis Clark as the medical examiner (uncredited)
- Bull Anderson as Otto, the janitor at Igor's museum in New York (uncredited)
- Walter Percival as Winton's attorney
- William B. Davidson as one of the detectives who arrests and interrogates Darcy (uncredited)
- Guy Usher as one of the detectives who arrests and interrogates Darcy (uncredited)
- Robert Homans as the desk sergeant (uncredited)

== Production ==
The film is based on an unpublished short story, "The Wax Works", by Charles S. Belden, who had also written a play called The Wax Museum, which was optioned by Charles Rogers, an independent producer. This had been discovered by Warner's copyright attorney, but the studio optioned the story from Belden for $1,000 before getting the attorney's report. Rogers dropped his option on the play when the co-author of a Broadway play with a similar plot threatened him with a lawsuit.

A follow-up to Warner's earlier horror film Doctor X (1932), Mystery involved many of the same cast and crew, including actors Lionel Atwill, Fay Wray, Arthur Edmund Carewe, and Thomas Jackson; director Michael Curtiz; art director Anton Grot; and cameraman Ray Rennahan. The film also re-used Doctor X's opening theme music by Bernhard Kaun.

=== Color ===
Mystery of the Wax Museum was the last of Warner's feature films under a 1931 contract with Technicolor, whose two-color system at the time combined separation photography printed with red and green dyes to create a color image with a reduced spectrum. As the novelty of color films began to wear off, Warner had noted a growing apathy, and even hostility, among critics and the public toward their Technicolor films since 1929, given the unreal hues and humdrum quality control, and this made the considerable additional expense seem less worthwhile. Warner had tried, without success, to get Technicolor to permit them to swap their last feature-length commitment for a series of shorts, but after the studio violated the contract by filming Doctor X with an additional black-and-white unit—thereby permitting them to process B&W prints at their own lab and avoid paying Technicolor thousands of dollars—Technicolor refused. Consequently, Mystery of the Wax Museum was the last studio feature filmed in two-color Technicolor. Because the heat generated by the extremely bright lights required for the process could melt wax, many of the statues in the film were portrayed by actors, though some have said this was always the plan and was intended to add a life-like verisimilitude to the wax exhibits.

Technicolor founder Herbert Kalmus declared the film "the ultimate that is possible with two components." Contemporary exhibitor reviews in The Film Daily document that the film's color was greatly admired by both theater owners and their audiences, who called it "beautiful" and "the best color I have ever seen", and some reviewers have said the eerie atmosphere created by the two-color process, along with Rennahan's lighting and Grot's set designs, adds to the appeal of the film. When Technicolor's three-strip process became available, Warner was the first to use it for live-action shorts, beginning with Service With a Smile (1934).

== Reception ==
Upon its release, Time magazine felt the film was a good mystery film, but was disappointed it lacked a scene at the end that explained everything and wrapped it all up. Mordaunt Hall of The New York Times praised the comic performances of Glenda Farrell and Frank McHugh, but found the overall film "too ghastly for comfort", writing: "It is all very well in its way to have a mad scientist performing operations in well-told stories, but when a melodrama depends upon the glimpses of covered bodies in a morgue and the stealing of some of them by an insane modeler in wax, it is going too far." The reviewer for Variety said the story was "loose and unconvincing", but liked the gruesome makeup and said the film should do well at neighborhood cinemas.

== Box office ==
At the box office, the film did better in Europe than it did in the United States, but still made a profit of $800,000. According to Warner Bros., it earned $325,000 domestically and $781,000 internationally, making it Warner's fifth-highest-grossing film of 1933.

== Preservation ==
The film was never reissued domestically, though it was reissued in Franco's Spain in 1940, and over time it came to be considered a lost film. In 1936, Technicolor-Hollywood stopped servicing two-color printing and is said to have issued a "last call" to their customers for prints as the final imbibition rigs were converted for their three-strip process, though records show scattered print runs of some two-color subjects after that date, and correspondence indicates that in 1940 Goldwyn Productions wanted to make two-color prints for Spain, and Technicolor was still able to service them. The response of most studios was to junk the two-color negatives of their now obsolete films, which were stored at Technicolor, but a precious few of these negatives survived, including those of the Eddie Cantor musical Whoopee!, which Goldwyn moved to their vaults. Warner Bros. kept the negatives for their two-color cartoons, but not their live-action projects. After the Warner library was sold as a package to Associated Artists Productions for television syndication in the late 1950s, Mystery of the Wax Museum, though it remained on the sales list, was never broadcast, because the negative vaults did not have a preprint to service it.

William K. Everson reported that Warner's London exchange kept a 35 mm color print on hand, and he saw the film there in 1947 as part of a series of free screenings to celebrate the 20th anniversary of sound films. He said the print subsequently began to decay and was destroyed. The "lab reference" 35 mm nitrate copy of the first reel of the film was still held by Technicolor-Hollywood in the 1960s, when it was screened by film historian Rudy Behlmer, but that reel is not in the Technicolor Collection of the Academy Film Archive and is presumed to have decomposed decades ago. According to the Wisconsin Historical Society's website, a 16mm copy of the film is located at the Wisconsin Center for Film and Theater Research.

In 1970, the Warner Bros. studio reference print of the film was found by former studio head Jack Warner in his personal collection. The American Film Institute made a new negative, which director of photography Ray Rennahan told historian Richard Koszarski looked so dismal he walked out of the screening room when it was shown to him. Nevertheless, it was screened at Grauman's Chinese Theatre in early summer of 1970, and then at Alice Tully Hall on September 26 at 4:00 pm as part of "Medium Rare 1927-1933", a retrospective of films not seen since their first release, at the 8th New York Film Festival.

United Artists made a low-contrast negative for TV prints, which lacked virtually all of the original color, and the film was released as part of UA's "Prime Time Showcase" television package in August 1972, which was first broadcast on the BBC in London before playing sixteen domestic TV markets. In Washington D.C., Mystery of the Wax Museum played on WTOP's Saturday night classic film series "Cinema Club 9" in late 1972. In New York City, it had its first airing in 1973 on WPIX-TV in a Sunday morning slot, cut by 15 minutes for commercials, before becoming a staple on the station's Saturday night Chiller Theater.

In 1988, the film's new owner, Turner Entertainment, made another new negative. The result was more faithful to the film's original color, but had intermittent damage, visible splices, and missing footage.

The Jack Warner nitrate print of the film resides at UCLA, which also holds a French workprint in the PHI collection. Uncovered by a Los Angeles collector in the early 2000s, the workprint has indifferent, pallid-plus-green color, French subtitles, and an English audio track, though some reels lack sound. In 2019, The Film Foundation sponsored a digital 4K restoration of the film by the UCLA Film & Television Archive, with funding from the George Lucas Family Foundation. The Warner print, with its superior color, was used as the primary resource, but it exhibited pickups at reel ends culled from different prints, and the French workprint, which was less pleasing overall, yielded shots and ends of reels that were tattered, broken, or missing in the main print, along with some lost lines of audio, as it was made from different matrixes. Other missing bits of audio were taken from other Warner Bros. films, including a line of Glenda Farrell's dialogue that was sourced from Life Begins (1932). Following Rennahan's directives in his oral histories as to how he lit for two-color and what palette he aimed to achieve in the film, the new restoration revealed subtle degrees of color that were latent in the nitrate print, but had been obscured by cross-contamination of the color dyes. The restored print of the film received its television premiere on the MeTV show Svengoolie on March 13, 2021, and theatrical Digital Cinema Packages of the restoration are available for archival and theatrical screening.

== Home media ==
A color version of the film, manipulated to look blue/pink, was released as an extra in standard definition on the Warner Bros. DVD and Blu-ray of the 1953 remake of the film, House of Wax.

On May 12, 2020, Warner Archive Collection released the film in 1080p HD as a stand-alone Blu-ray, utilizing a Rec. 709 submaster of the UCLA restoration. With corrected color, restored sound, and digital correction of wear-and-tear to the image, this release garnered universal rave-reviews, with many commenters noting that it was as if they were seeing the film for the first time. Extras included two audio commentaries, one by Michael Curtiz biographer Alan Rode, and the other by UCLA preservationist Scott MacQueen, whose commentary features excerpts from interviews he conducted with Fay Wray and Glenda Farrell.

== Remakes ==
- House of Wax (1953) stars Vincent Price and was directed by Andre de Toth. Whereas the original is more of a mystery film and set in then-contemporary New York City, this remake focuses more on the horror elements and takes the story back to a gaslit, turn-of-the-century setting. However, both films did have one unusual tendency in common: they were vehicles for gimmicks. Mystery was filmed in the early two-color Technicolor process, and House of Wax showcased two other then-novel film technologies, 3-D and stereophonic sound.
- Mill of the Stone Women (1960), the first Italian horror film shot in color, borrows the same basic plot (though the wax-coated corpses are placed in a macabre carousel display instead of a museum). A period piece set in Holland in 1892, this film includes an identical finale showing the figures melting in a massive fire.
- Chamber of Horrors (1966) is the theatrical release of an unsold House of Wax television pilot. Set in Edwardian times, it includes two gimmicks, a "Fear Flasher" and "Horror Horn", that warn the audience to prepare for a supposedly shocking scene of horror or violence.
- Nightmare in Wax (1969): Cameron Mitchell plays Vincent Renard, a former film special effects artist who is disfigured by Max Block, the head of Paragon Pictures, and also a rival for the affections of a woman (Anne Helm). Leaving the film industry, Vince becomes a recluse and opens a wax museum. Within a few months, four popular Paragon stars disappear. Wax figures of the missing stars are later featured in the museum and the police become suspicious.
- House of Wax (2005) is a contemporary slasher film, not a period piece, directed by Jaume Collet-Serra and featuring Elisha Cuthbert, Chad Michael Murray, and Paris Hilton. The story, which involves a group of young people accidentally discovering a small, hidden village made out of wax, has little in common with the previous film incarnations.

== See also ==
- List of American films of 1933
- List of early color feature films
- List of rediscovered films

== Sources ==
- Koszarski, Richard (1979). Mystery of the Wax Museum. Madison, Wisconsin: University of Wisconsin Press. ISBN 978-0-299-07674-0.
- Rigby, Jonathan (2007). American Gothic: Sixty Years of Horror Cinema. London: Reynolds & Heam. ISBN 978-1-905-28725-3.
- Robertson, James C. (1993). The Casablanca Man: The Cinema of Michael Curtiz. New York: Routledge. ISBN 978-0-415-06804-8.
