= Harold Nicholas =

American tap dancer (1921–2000)

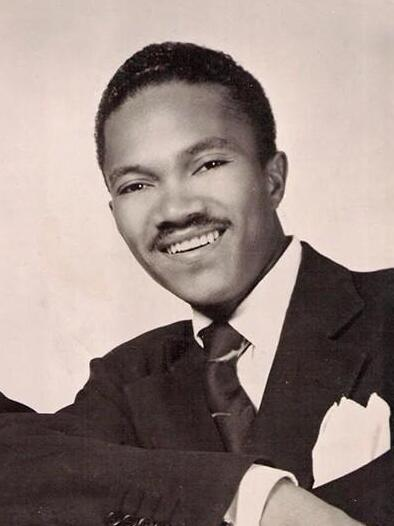
- Born: Harold Lloyd Nicholas; March 27, 1921; Winston-Salem, North Carolina, U.S.
- Died: July 3, 2000 (aged 79); New York City, U.S.
- Occupations: Dancer; choreographer; actor; theatrical director
- Years active: 1932-1999
- Spouses: Dorothy Dandridge (m. 1942; div. 1951) Elyanne Patronne (divorced) Rigmor A. Newman (m. 1977)
- Children: 2
- Relatives: Fayard Nicholas (brother)
- Awards: Hollywood Walk of Fame
- Website: nicholasbrothers.com

Harold Lloyd Nicholas (March 27, 1921 – July 3, 2000) was an American dancer specializing in tap. Nicholas was the younger half of the tap-dancing pair the Nicholas Brothers, known as two of the world's greatest dancers. His older brother was Fayard Nicholas. Nicholas was featured in such musicals as An All-Colored Vaudeville Show (1935), Stormy Weather (1943), The Pirate (1948), and The Five Heartbeats (1991).

== Life and career ==
=== Early years ===
Nicholas was born to drummer and orchestra leader Ulysses Dominick Nicholas, Jr. and pianist Viola Harden in Winston-Salem, North Carolina. By the age of three, his older brother Fayard enjoyed sitting in the audience of the black vaudeville theater where his parents performed, enraptured by the great performers on stage. Immersed in show business, when the Nicholases added a second son to the family, seven-year-old Fayard insisted that the child be named after his idol, Harold Lloyd, the silent-screen comedian. The two brothers soon began dancing, and they quickly gained acclaim for their elegant acrobatic moves and mastery of tap. When Fayard was 16 and Harold nine, they made their first appearance at the legendary Cotton Club in New York City and were a popular success immediately.

=== Career ===
Their reputation grew rapidly, and Harold and Fayard became established superstars at Twentieth Century Fox with their astounding dance numbers in the studio's musicals features. The brothers began appearing in musical films with Eubie Blake. They performed in vaudeville, on Broadway, in nightclubs, on television, and in movie musicals. Harold appeared in more than 50 feature films, including The Big Broadcast (1936), Down Argentine Way (1940), Tin Pan Alley (1940), and Sun Valley Serenade (1941), which features the show-stopping "Chattanooga Choo Choo" tap dance number performed by Harold, Fayard, and Dorothy Dandridge.

Fred Astaire told the brothers that their dazzling footwork, leaps and splits in the Jumpin’ Jive dance in Stormy Weather (1943) produced the greatest movie musical number he had ever seen. In the number, the brothers dance on a piano and leap over performing musicians. The Nicholas Brothers’ Hollywood career began after movie mogul Samuel Goldwyn spotted them in a nightclub and cast them in Kid Millions (1934). The two became big film stars despite racial restrictions at the time prohibiting speaking parts and scenes with white co-stars. Their last film together was 1948's The Pirate, in which Gene Kelly danced with them, breaking the color barrier. Harold went on to work as a solo artist, moving to France and touring as a singer and dancer. He appeared in the French film L’Empire De La Nuit (1964).

=== Later life ===
Harold returned to America occasionally to do shows with his brother. Harold also appeared in the films Uptown Saturday Night (1974), Tap (1989), The Five Heartbeats (1991) and Funny Bones (1995). In 1985–86, Nicholas played the role of "Daddy Bates" in the National Tour of the Broadway musical The Tap Dance Kid. In 1993, he starred in the Milwaukee Repertory Theatre's world premiere of If These Shoes Could Talk, which also starred Tony nominee Ted Levy, an original tap dance musical by Lee Summers and Kevin Ramsey. The leading character, a seasoned triple threat/hoofer, "Dr Rhythm," was written for Nicholas and would be his farewell stage performance in a musical. Carnegie Hall sold out for a tribute to him and his brother in 1998, who were both present. By that time he had been living on New York's Upper West Side, where he lived for approximately 20 years with his third wife Rigmor Alfredsson Newman, a producer.

== Personal life ==
Nicholas was married three times and had two children. His first marriage, on September 6, 1942, was to the actress, singer and dancer Dorothy Dandridge. They met at the Cotton Club in Harlem in 1938. Together they had a daughter, Harolyn Suzanne, who was born on September 2, 1943 (died in 2003), with severe brain damage that prevented her from speaking or even acknowledging her parents. By 1948, their marriage had deteriorated and Nicholas abandoned his family. Their marriage lasted nine years, ending in 1951. Nicholas had been linked briefly in Europe to Swiss actress Nyta Dover. Nicholas had a son, Melih, with his second wife Elyanne Patronne. At the time of his death, he was married to Rigmor Newman Nicholas.

== Death and honors ==
Nicholas died in New York City on July 3, 2000, at the age of 79, from heart failure. Nicholas was inducted into the National Museum of Dance C.V. Whitney Hall of Fame in 2001, along with his brother Fayard Nicholas.

== Filmography ==
Nicholas appeared in the following films dancing alongside his brother Fayard, with occasional solos:

- Pie, Pie Blackbird (1932)
- The Emperor Jones (1933) [solo]
- Syncopancy (1933) [solo]
- Kid Millions (1934)
- An All-Colored Vaudeville Show (1935)
- The Big Broadcast of 1936 (1935)
- Coronado (1935)
- The Black Network (1936)
- My American Wife (1936)
- Calling All Stars (1937)
- Down Argentine Way (1940)
- Tin Pan Alley (1940)
- The Great American Broadcast (1941)
- Sun Valley Serenade (1941)
- Orchestra Wives (1942)
- Stormy Weather (1943)
- Take It or Leave It (1944)
- Reckless Age (1944) [solo]
- Carolina Blues (1944) [solo]
- Dixieland Jamboree (1946)
- The Pirate (1948)
- Botta e Riposta (1951)
- Pathé News Reel (1948)
- L'Empire de la nuit (1963) [solo]
- The Liberation of L.B. Jones (1970)
- Uptown Saturday Night (1974) [solo]
- That's Entertainment! (1974)
- Disco 9000 (1974) [solo]
- That's Dancing! (1985)
- Tap (1989) [solo]
- The Five Heartbeats (1990) [solo]
- A&E Special: The Nicholas Brothers (1992) [as self]
- Funny Bones (1995) [solo]
- Broadway: The Golden Age, by the Legends Who Were There (2002) [as self]

== See also ==
- List of dancers
