= Jerry Bergen =

American comedic actor and performer (1899–1986)

- Born: January 4, 1899
- Died: January 1986 (aged 86–87)

Jerry Bergen was a comedic actor and performer in the United States. He was in numerous films and television shows and he also performed on the vaudeville circuit. The Chicago Sunday Tribune called him "one of the funniest men in the world".

He hosted his own short-lived 15 minute variety show titled Buzzy Wuzzy. He performed pantomimes and musical comedy. He also appeared on various television comedy variety shows. The Pittsburgh Post-Gazette referred to Bergen as a "top pantomime comedian".

Small in stature, he was reported to be 4 feet 6 inches tall.

A Billboard article reported that his first vaudeville performance was in 1930 in the afterpiece Amateur Night that played at the Palace Theatre in New York. He had previously been a drummer with the Meyer Davis Orchestra. He also played the fiddle.

A review of the 1952 show in which he performed at Ciro's London read, in part, "Way above the rest is diminutive Jerry Bergen, whose comedics on the violin rouses the customers and brings new life to a limping show. He's a natural comic and his entire act bears the stamp of impeccable timing and immaculate showmanship. Show would have been far more attractive had he been allowed to hold the fort alone".

He appeared on The Jackie Gleason Show. He was also on a The Lambs Gambol comedy television show.

== Filmography ==
- 20,000 Cheers for the Chain Gang (1933)
- Tomalio (1933)
- With Love and Kisses (1936)
- The Little Maestro (1937)
- Flying with Music (1942) as Wilbur
- Big V Comedies film short
- Let's Get Tough! (1942)
- The Pirate (1948 film) as Bolo
- Buzzy Wuzzy (1948), television show, starred with Imogene Coca
