= The Silent Partner (1931 film) =

1931 film

- Directed by: Roy Mack
- Written by: Rupert Hughes
- Produced by: Samuel Sax
- Starring: William Gaxton
- Cinematography: Edwin B. DuPar
- Edited by: Everett Dodd
- Production company: The Vitaphone Corporation
- Distributed by: Warner Bros.
- Release date: August 2, 1931 (U.S.)
- Running time: 19 minutes
- Country: United States

The Silent Partner or Vitaphone 1250–51: The Silent Partner is a 1931 American short drama black and white film directed by Roy Mack and starring William Gaxton. It is produced by The Vitaphone Corporation.

== Cast ==
- William Gaxton as Bill, the Nephew
- Shirley Palmer as Bill's Wife
- Frank McGlynn Sr.
- Ed Robbins
- Roger Gray
- Winifred Harris
- Detmar Poppen
