= Tomalio =

1933 film

- Directed by: Ray McCarey
- Written by: Jack Henley
- Produced by: Samuel Sax
- Starring: Fatty Arbuckle
- Production company: Warner Bros. Pictures
- Distributed by: Warner Bros. Pictures
- Release date: December 30, 1933
- Running time: 21 minutes
- Country: United States
- Language: English

Tomalio is a 1933 American Pre-Code comedy film directed by Ray McCarey and starring Fatty Arbuckle. It was Arbuckle's last-released film, appearing after his death. Professor of Theater & Film Donald W. McCaffrey described the film as a "cheaply made two-reeler" with a "poverty of gag invention".

== Cast ==
- Fatty Arbuckle as Wilbur
- Fritz Hubert as Wilbur's pal
- Charles Judels as The General
- Phyllis Holden as Lolita
- Jerry Bergen
- Pierre de Ramey
- Clyde Veaux
- Clarence Rock
- Aristides de Leoni
- John Barclay
- Lew Kessler

== See also ==
- Fatty Arbuckle filmography
