= The Black Network =

- Film title card
- Directed by: Roy Mack
- Written by: A. Dorian Otvos
- Starring: Nina Mae McKinney; Nicholas Brothers; The Washboard Serenaders; Babe Wallace; Amanda Randolph
- Cinematography: Ray Foster
- Edited by: Bert Frank
- Music by: Cliff Hess
- Production company: Vitaphone
- Distributed by: Vitaphone
- Release date: 1936
- Running time: 20 minutes
- Country: United States
- Language: English

The Black Network is a 1936 American musical short directed by Roy Mack and released by Vitaphone.

== Synopsis ==
Nina Mae McKinney plays the star performer of a radio show who must contend with the sponsor's wife, who wants to take over her spot. The wife, Mezzanine, is more than willing to use her husband's shoe polish company to blackmail the show to do as she wishes. Ultimately Mezzanine's singing is so terrible that listeners complain and she is taken off the show, the status quo restored.

== Cast ==
- Nina Mae McKinney - radio show performer
- The Nicholas Brothers - self
- The Washboard Serenaders - self
- Babe Wallace - boyfriend of radio show performer
- Amanda Randolph - Mezzanine Johnson

== Production ==
The Black Network went into production at the Brooklyn Vitaphone studios during December 1935, starting on December 7. Nina Mae McKinney and The Nicholas Brothers were announced as the film's stars; they had previously worked together in the 1932 Roy Mack film Pie Pie Blackbird. The film, which was created as part of the "Broadway Brevity" series, adapted a script written by A. Dorian Otvos and special songs were credited to Cliff Hess. Photography was by Ray Foster and the film was edited by Bert Frank.

== Release ==
The Black Network was released to theaters in 1936, where it was shown as a supplemental film alongside movies such as The Lion's Den and Adventure in Manhattan.

== Reception ==
The Film Daily praised The Black Network, citing the actors' performances as a highlight while noting that the story was not original.

== See also ==
- Vitaphone Varieties
