= Buzzy Wuzzy =

American TV series or program (1948)

- Presented by: Jerry Bergen; Imogene Coca
- Country of origin: United States
- Original language: English

Production
- Running time: 15 minutes

Original release
- Network: ABC
- Release: November 17 – December 8, 1948

Buzzy Wuzzy is an early American variety/comedy series that aired on ABC on Wednesday nights from 7:30 pm to 7:45 pm Eastern Time from November 17 to December 8, 1948.

Many newspapers listed the series as The Jerry Bergen Show in their television schedule section.

== Synopsis ==
Jerry Bergen and Imogene Coca were hosts of the short-lived series, which consisted of comedy skits and variety acts. This was Imogene Coca's first network television program, and she was hired by M.J. Productions, a packaging and marketing firm, which sponsored the series.

== Episode status ==
The series was broadcast live, and there are no known recorded episodes.
