= Rufus Jones for President =

- Directed by: Roy Mack
- Written by: A. Dorian Otvos; Cyrus Wood
- Starring: Ethel Waters; Sammy Davis Jr.
- Cinematography: Edwin B. DuPar
- Music by: Cliff Hess
- Distributed by: Warner Bros.
- Release date: September 9, 1933
- Running time: 21 minutes
- Country: United States
- Language: English

Rufus Jones for President is a 1933 American pre-Code satirical musical-comedy short film, running 21 minutes. The film was directed by Roy Mack, and starred Ethel Waters and Sammy Davis Jr., in his first onscreen appearance, as the title character.

== Plot ==
Rufus Jones is an African American child who is elected president of the United States.

== Cast ==
- Ethel Waters as Mother of Rufus Jones
- Sammy Davis Jr. as Rufus Jones
- Hamtree Harrington
- Dusty Fletcher
- Edgar Connor
- The Will Vodery Girls
- The Russell Wooding's Jubilee Singers
- Russell Wooding as The Russell Wooding's Jubilee Singers (uncredited)

== Soundtrack ==
- "Am I Blue?" - Music by Harry Akst, words by Grant Clarke
- "Underneath the Harlem Moon" - Music by Harry Revel, words by Mack Gordon
- "Lullaby" - Written by Cliff Hess
- "Rufus Jones for President" - Written by Cliff Hess
- "You Rascal You" - Written by Sam Theard
- "Take an Oath" - Written by Cliff Hess
- "The Great Day's Come" - Written by Cliff Hess
- "Puttin' it on" - Written by Cliff Hess

== Home media ==
Rufus Jones for President was released on the six-disc Big Band, Jazz & Swing set of short subjects by Warner Archive Collection. It is also available on the Warner DVD release of The Green Pastures.
