= Noble Sissle =

American jazz musician, bandleader and playwright (1889–1975)

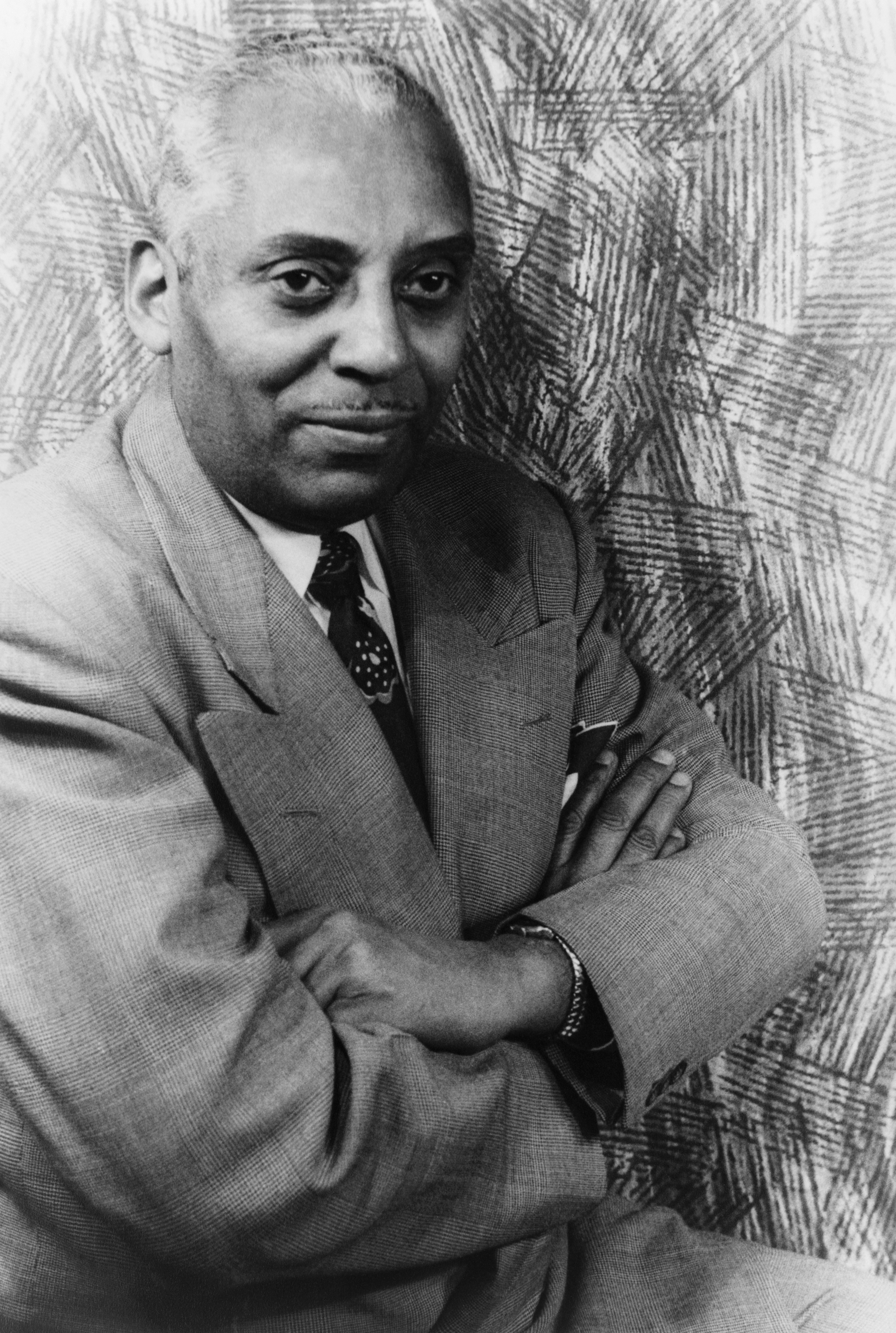
Noble Sissle photo taken by Carl Van Vechten, 1951

Noble Lee Sissle (July 10, 1889 – December 17, 1975) was an American jazz composer, lyricist, bandleader, singer, and playwright, best known for the Broadway musical Shuffle Along (1921), and its hit song "I'm Just Wild About Harry". He also served as the first president of the Negro Actors Guild.

I'm Just Wild About Harry

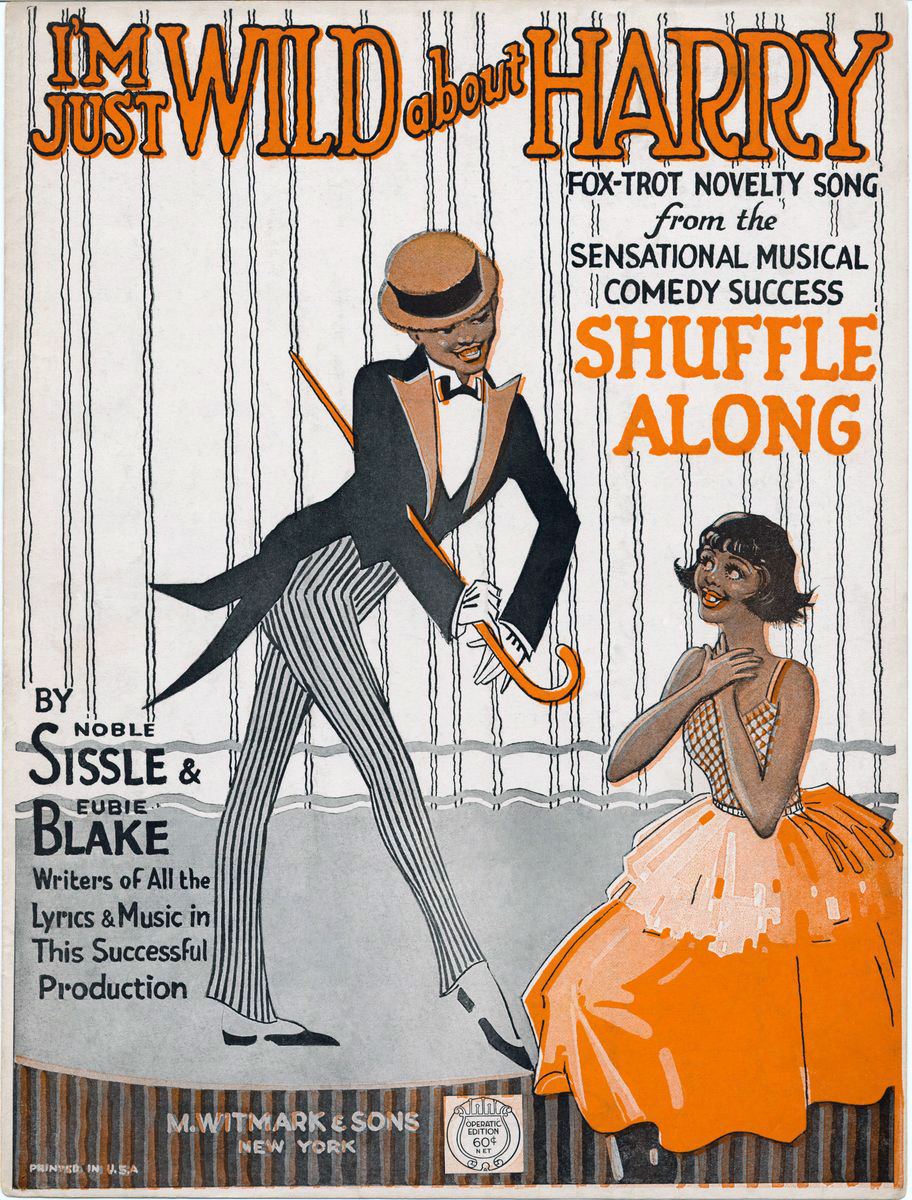
Sheet music cover for "I'm Just Wild About Harry" from the musical Shuffle Along by Noble Sissle and Eubie Blake, 1921

== Early life ==
Sissle was born in Indianapolis, Indiana, United States, around the time his father Rev. George A. Sissle was pastor of the city's Simpson M. E. Chapel. His mother, Martha Angeline (née Scott) Sissle, was a school teacher and juvenile probation officer.

As a youth, Sissle sang in church choirs and as a soloist with his high school's glee club in Cleveland, Ohio. Sissle attended De Pauw University in Greencastle, Indiana on scholarship and later transferred to Butler University in Indianapolis before turning to music full-time.

== Career ==
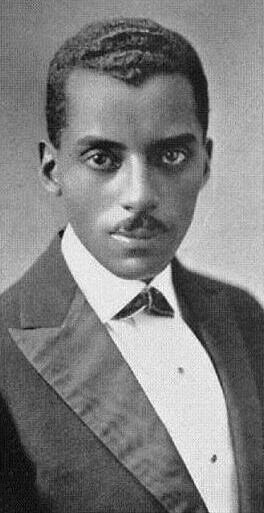
Noble Lee Sissle circa 1920 (NYPL Digital Collection)

In early 1916, Sissle joined one of the society orchestras organized by James Reese Europe in New York. He persuaded Europe to also hire his friend, pianist and composer Eubie Blake, and later in the year helped Europe organize a regimental band for the 15th Infantry Regiment (Colored) of the New York National Guard. This would later become the New York 369th Infantry "Hell Fighters" Regiment that served nobly in France in World War I, with Europe as a lieutenant and Sissle as his sergeant and lead vocalist. Unlike most military bands it played syncopated music and was credited with introducing jazz to France. Sissle left the army after the war as a second lieutenant with the 370th Infantry Regiment and joined Europe's civilian version of the 369th band.

Sissle began recording for the Pathé label in early 1917, and sang several vocals on Pathé discs recorded by Europe's 369th Infantry Band in early 1919, after it had become a civilian band.

Not long afterwards, on May 9, 1919, James Europe was murdered by a disgruntled band member in Boston, Massachusetts, leaving Sissle, with the help of his friend, Eubie Blake, to take temporary charge of Europe's band. Years earlier Sissle had struck up a partnership with Blake after they first met in Baltimore in 1915.

Shortly after World War I, Sissle joined forces with Blake to form a vaudeville music duo, "The Dixie Duo". After vaudeville, the pair began work on the jazz musical revue Shuffle Along, which incorporated many songs they had written, and had a book written by F. E. Miller and Aubrey Lyles. When it premiered in 1921, Shuffle Along became the first hit musical on Broadway written by and about African Americans. It was the first all-black show to reach the Broadway stage in over a decade and included a teenage Josephine Baker among the performers. The musical introduced songs such as "I'm Just Wild About Harry" and "Love Will Find a Way".

Sissle and his band appear in a 1931 British Pathétone Weekly filmed at Ciro's nightclub in London, performing Walter Donaldson's "Little White Lies" and "Happy Feet", written by Jack Yellen and Milton Ager. In 1932, Sissle appeared with Nina Mae McKinney, the Nicholas Brothers, and Eubie Blake in Pie, Pie Blackbird, a Vitaphone short released by Warner Bros. In February 1931, Sissle accompanied Adelaide Hall on piano at the prestigious Palace Theatre (Broadway) in New York during her 1931-32 world tour. In 1932, Noble Sissle and Band appeared in the Vitaphone film "That's the Spirit," also featuring Cora La Redd and Miller and Moreland. Sissle collaborated with other artists such as Lena Horne and Duke Ellington, and was friends with Ethel Waters, Cab Calloway, and Nat King Cole. In 1937, Sissle helped found the Negro Actors Guild, serving as its first president. Despite his friendship history with Al Jolson, Sissle would become openly critical of Jolson's use of blackface and "Mammy" routine by 1938. During World War 2, he would tour with the USO. In 1954, the New York radio station WMGM, which was then owned by Loew's Theatre Organization, signed Sissle as a disc jockey. His show featured the music of African-American recording artists. Sissle was a member of Alpha Phi Alpha fraternity.

== Legacy ==
In 2018, Sissle was the subject of the award-winning documentary Noble Sissle's Syncopated Ragtime, directed by Daniel L. Bernardi and David de Rozas.

== See also ==
- African American musical theater

== Bibliography ==
- Carlin, Richard & Ken Bloom (2020). Eubie Blake: Rags, Rhythm, and Race ISBN 9780190635930
- Williams, Iain Cameron (2002). Underneath A Harlem Moon ISBN 0-8264-5893-9 Chapter 3: Shuffle-Along Nicely - recounts the Shuffle Along musical.
