= La Cucaracha (1934 film) =

1934 film

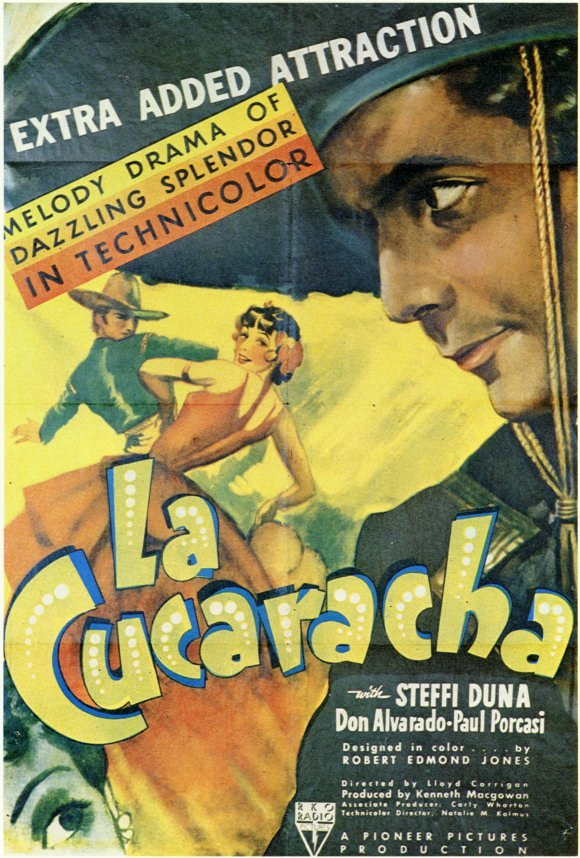
- Original film poster
- Directed by: Lloyd Corrigan
- Written by: Lloyd Corrigan; Carly Wharton; John Twist; Jack Wagner
- Produced by: Kenneth Macgowan; Carly Wharton
- Starring: Steffi Duna; Don Alvarado
- Cinematography: Ray Rennahan
- Edited by: Archie Marshek
- Music by: Roy Webb; Eduardo Durant
- Production company: Pioneer Pictures
- Distributed by: RKO Radio Pictures
- Release date: August 31, 1934
- Running time: 20 minutes
- Country: United States
- Language: English

La Cucaracha is a 1934 American short musical film directed by Lloyd Corrigan. The film was designed by Robert Edmond Jones, who was hired by Pioneer Pictures to design the film in a way to show the new full-color Technicolor Process No. 4 ("three-strip" Technicolor) at its best. Process No. 4 had been used since 1932, mainly in Walt Disney cartoons. Jock Whitney and his cousin C. V. Whitney, the owners of Pioneer, were also major investors in Technicolor. La Cucaracha was made like a short feature and cost about $65,000. The usual short film at that time cost little more than $15,000 to film.

Although La Cucaracha is sometimes called the first live-action use of Process No. 4, it was preceded by a musical number in the feature film The Cat and the Fiddle, released by MGM in February 1934, and in some short sequences filmed for other movies made during 1934, including the final sequences of The House of Rothschild (Twentieth Century Pictures/United Artists) with George Arliss. Also, Warner Brothers released a Leon Errol short, Service With a Smile (released July 28, 1934), just before La Cucaracha.

Producer Kenneth Macgowan won an Oscar in 1935 for Best Short Subject (Comedy) for this film.

== Plot ==
Señor Martinez, a famous theater owner, visits a local café in Mexico because of its reputation for good food and to audition the famous dancer who performs there. Martinez tells the café owner that if the dancer is as good as he has heard, he will offer the dancer a contract to perform in his theater. The café's female singer hears about this and is determined he won't leave the café without her.

== Cast ==
- Steffi Duna as Chaquita
- Don Alvarado as Pancho
- Paul Porcasi as Señor Esteban Martinez
- Eduardo Durant as Orchestra Leader
- Sam Appel as Cafe manager
- Chris-Pin Martin as Chaquita's Fan in Cafe
- Julian Rivero as Esteban
- Charles Stevens as Pancho's Valet

== DVD release ==
On January 25, 2000, The Roan Group released La Cucaracha on Region 1 DVD as an extra with the restored 1930 feature Dixiana. On October 27, 2009, Alpha Video released La Cucaracha on Region 0 DVD.
