= Merry-Go-Round of 1938 =

- Theatrical release poster
- Directed by: Irving Cummings
- Screenplay by: Monte Brice; A. Dorian Otvos
- Story by: Monte Brice; Henry Myers
- Produced by: Buddy DeSylva
- Starring: Bert Lahr; Jimmy Savo; Billy House; Alice Brady; Mischa Auer; Joy Hodges; Louise Fazenda; John 'Dusty' King; Barbara Read
- Cinematography: Joseph Valentine
- Edited by: Ted J. Kent; Charles Maynard
- Music by: Score: Charles Previn; Songs: Jimmy McHugh (music); Harold Adamson (lyrics)
- Production company: Universal Pictures
- Distributed by: Universal Pictures
- Release date: November 14, 1937
- Running time: 87 minutes
- Country: United States
- Language: English

Merry-Go-Round of 1938 is a 1937 American comedy film directed by Irving Cummings and written by Monte Brice and A. Dorian Otvos. The film stars Bert Lahr, Jimmy Savo, Billy House, Alice Brady, Mischa Auer, Joy Hodges, Louise Fazenda, John 'Dusty' King and Barbara Read. The film was released on November 14, 1937, by Universal Pictures.

Merry-Go-Round of 1938 was the first (and last) of a proposed series of films spotlighting Broadway talent. Three headliners from the Great White Way, comedian Bert Lahr, pantomime Jimmy Savo, and monologist Billy House team with veteran Hollywood scene stealer Mischa Auer. The storyline has our four heroes taking care of a cute little girl, but the plot is forgotten amidst a series of choice specialty acts. Universal took a bath with Merry-Go-Round of 1938, which explains why there wasn't a Merry-Go-Round of 1939.

== Cast ==
- Bert Lahr as Bert
- Jimmy Savo as Jimmy
- Billy House as Billy
- Alice Brady as Aunt Hortense
- Mischa Auer as Mischa
- Joy Hodges as Sally Brown
- Louise Fazenda as Mrs. Penelope Updike
- John 'Dusty' King as Tony Townsend
- Barbara Read as Clarice Stockbridge
- Dave Apollon as Dave Apollon
- Richard Carle as Col. J. Addison Frooks
- Howard Cantonwine as Hector
- Charles Williams as Dave Clark
- Joyce Kay as Sally
- Fay Helm as Dainty Doris
- John Kelly as Bus Driver
- Beverly Ann Welch as Trap drummer
