= Tin Pan Alley (film) =

1940 American film by Walter Lang

- Theatrical release poster
- Directed by: Walter Lang
- Screenplay by: Robert Ellis; Helen Logan
- Story by: Pamela Harris
- Produced by: Kenneth Macgowan
- Starring: Alice Faye; Betty Grable; Jack Oakie; John Payne
- Cinematography: Leon Shamroy
- Edited by: Walter A. Thompson
- Music by: Alfred Newman
- Production company: 20th Century-Fox
- Distributed by: 20th Century-Fox
- Release date: November 29, 1940
- Running time: 94 minutes
- Country: United States
- Language: English
- Box office: $1.645 million (U.S. and Canada rentals)

Tin Pan Alley is a 1940 musical film directed by Walter Lang and starring Alice Faye and Betty Grable (their only film together) as vaudeville singers/sisters and John Payne and Jack Oakie as songwriters in the years before World War I.

Alfred Newman received the 1940 Academy Award for Best Musical Score for his work on the film, the second of his nine Oscars. The film was also nominated for American Film Institute's 2006 list of the AFI's Greatest Movie Musicals.

== Plot ==
Katie and Lily Blaine are a singing-sister act playing the vaudeville circuit. Songwriters Skeets Harrigan and Harry Calhoun see star potential in the sister act.

== Cast ==
- Alice Faye as Katie Blane
- Betty Grable as Lily Blane
- Jack Oakie as Harry Calhoun
- John Payne as Francis 'Skeets' Harrigan
- Allen Jenkins as Casey
- Esther Ralston as Nora Bayes
- Fayard Nicholas as Dance Specialty
- Harold Nicholas as Dance Specialty
- Ben Carter as Boy
- John Loder as Captain Reginald 'Reggie' Carstair
- Elisha Cook Jr. as Joe Codd
- Fred Keating as Harvey Raymond

== Casting ==
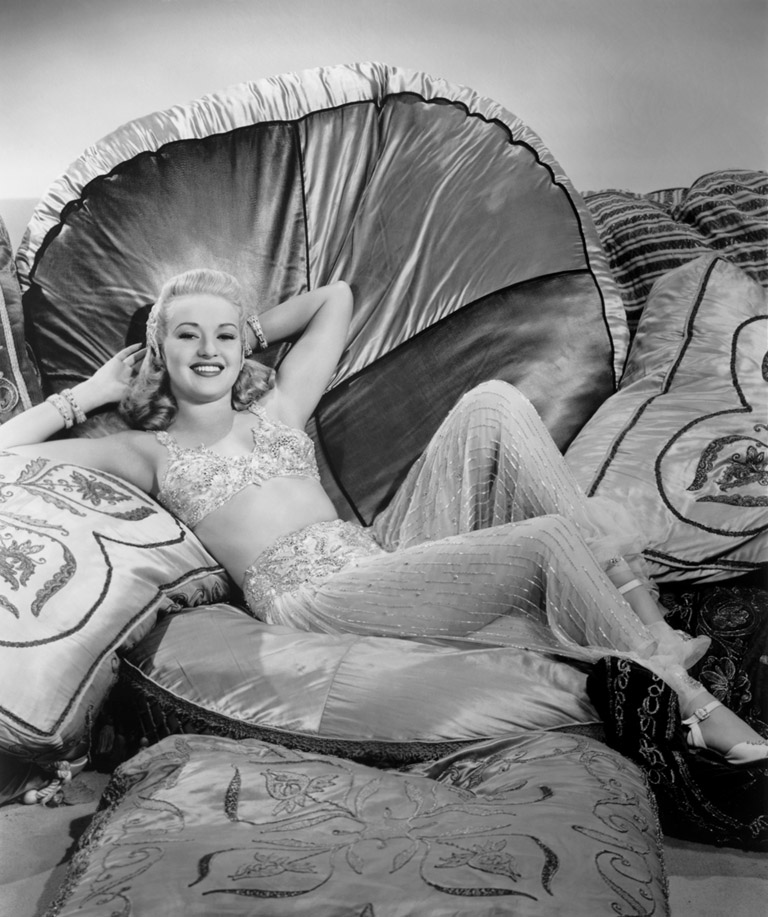
Betty Grable in the film.

Before filming began, there was said to be a feud between Faye and Grable, although the two actresses had never met. On the first day of production, the actresses quickly got along and became lifelong friends.

Tyrone Power and Don Ameche were considered for the leading roles, but scheduling conflicts took them out of the running.
