= Pioneer Pictures =

American film production company

Pioneer Pictures, Inc. was a Hollywood motion picture company, most noted for its early commitment to making color films. Pioneer was initially affiliated with RKO Pictures, whose production facilities in Culver City, California were used by Pioneer, and who distributed Pioneer's films. Pioneer later merged with Selznick International Pictures.

== History ==
The company was formed in 1933 by investor John Hay Whitney, who wanted to get into the motion picture business, and his cousin Cornelius Vanderbilt Whitney, on the encouragement of RKO executive Merian C. Cooper, an enthusiast of the newly improved, full-color Technicolor Process No. 4, introduced in 1932. The process had been used thus far only in Walt Disney cartoons. Technicolor, Inc. had been operating at a loss in 1931–1933, mostly servicing old contracts for its two-component color system, and badly needed a movie studio that would move the new three-component process into feature filmmaking. Although there was no formal connection between Technicolor and Pioneer, the Whitneys invested in stock and stock options estimated at 15 percent of Technicolor.

Pioneer announced that its first color production would be The Last Days of Pompeii, but it was eventually filmed by RKO in black and white. Other never-realized color projects were adaptations of the novels The Three Musketeers and Green Mansions. Instead, Pioneer designated the musical short La Cucaracha (1934) to be its Technicolor live-action showcase, and subsequently won an Academy Award for it.

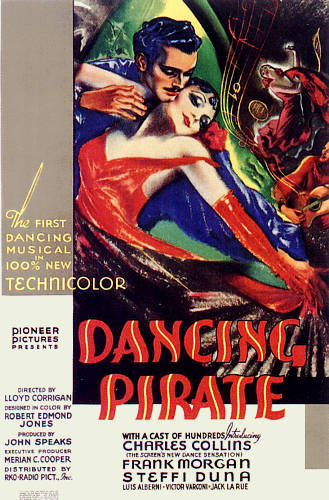
Pioneer's Dancing Pirate (1936) was the second feature in full color

On May 18, 1933 Pioneer Pictures Inc. signed a contract with Technicolor for the production of eight feature films in the full color process, and hired RKO's Merian C. Cooper to be its vice-president in charge of production. Becky Sharp (1935), an adaptation of Thackeray's novel Vanity Fair, became the first feature-length motion picture in full color, followed by Dancing Pirate (1936). (Note: Numerous earlier features had been made in color from 1912 onward, but used two-component color processes with limited color rendition. Technicolor Process No. 4 was a three-component system that covered the whole color spectrum.)

Helen Gahagan became the first actor under a multi-picture contract with Pioneer Pictures, while John Ford was engaged to direct several color productions, starting with The Life of Custer. Neither would actually make a picture with Pioneer.

The Whitneys became founding investors in the newly formed Selznick International Pictures in 1935, and Pioneer Pictures was informally merged with it the following year, after Pioneer completed its releasing obligations with RKO. Directing contracts with John Ford and George Cukor were transferred. Selznick International, which also used the RKO studio and Forty Acres backlot, carried out Pioneer's commitment to produce features in Technicolor. Two Selznick color productions, A Star Is Born (1937) and Nothing Sacred (1937), were in fact copyrighted to Pioneer Pictures.

Selznick International Pictures was dissolved by its owners in 1940–1943. John Hay Whitney then sold Becky Sharp, Dancing Pirate, A Star Is Born, and Nothing Sacred to the distributing company Film Classics, Inc. Film Classics was acquired by Cinecolor Corporation in 1947 — a company specializing in a two-component color process. Cinecolor resold Film Classics to Film Classics' officers in 1949.

== Filmography ==
- La Cucaracha (1934 film)

== References and notes ==
- "Technicolor Adventures in Cinemaland" H. T. Kalmus, reprinted from Journal of the Society of Motion Picture Engineers, December, 1938
