= Nina Mae McKinney =

American actress (1912–1967)

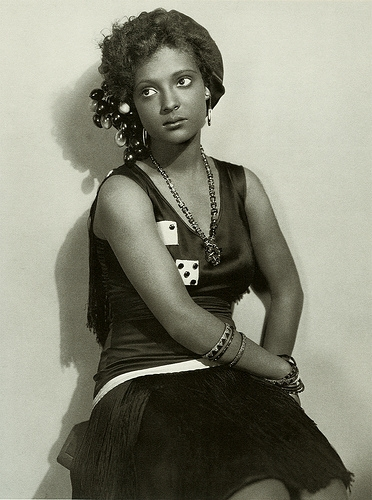
- McKinney in costume, 1929 film Hallelujah
- Born: Nannie Mayme McKinney; June 12, 1912; Lancaster, South Carolina, U.S.
- Died: May 3, 1967 (aged 54); New York City, U.S.
- Other names: Nina McKinney, The Black Garbo
- Occupations: Actress, singer
- Years active: 1927–1967
- Spouse: James "Jimmy" Monroe (m. 1931; div. 1938)

Nina Mae McKinney (June 12, 1912 – May 3, 1967) was an American actress and singer who worked internationally during the 1930s and in the postwar period in theatre, film and television, after beginning her career on Broadway and in Hollywood. Dubbed "The Black Garbo" in Europe because of her striking beauty, McKinney was both one of the first African-American film stars in the United States and one of the first African-Americans to appear on British television.

== Life and career ==
=== Early life ===
McKinney was born June 12, 1912, in Lancaster, South Carolina, to Georgia Crawford and Hal Napoleon McKinney. Shortly after McKinney's birth, her mother often hid from her abusive husband in the house of Colonel Leroy Springs (of Springs Industries), for whom she worked as a domestic.

By 1920, Crawford relocated to Savannah, Georgia, to work as a cook for Cynthia Withers, her daughter Irene, and other white lodgers. McKinney stayed behind on Gay Street in the Gills Creek neighborhood with her 70-year old paternal grandmother, Mary A. McKinney. Hal supported the family financially as a delivery man for a local drugstore. Meanwhile, Georgia had married James Edwin Maynor and migrated north to New York. Eight-year-old McKinney followed them shortly afterward, but was sent back down south to stay with her Uncle Curtis and his family in Gills Creek when her father went to prison. In 1923, Hal escaped from his chain gang and was never recaptured.

In 1923, McKinney went to live with Colonel Springs as a live-in domestic. Her duties included delivering and collecting parcels from the local post office. To entertain herself as she made the trips, she did stunts on her bicycle. She began acting in small scale school productions at the Lancaster Training School.

Around 1925, 13-year-old McKinney relocated to Manhattan to stay with her mother and stepfather, and she attended public school at 126 Lower Manhattan. By the summer of 1927, she had given up school completely.

=== Marriage ===
In November 1931, McKinney married jazz musician James "Jimmy" Monroe. They divorced in 1938.

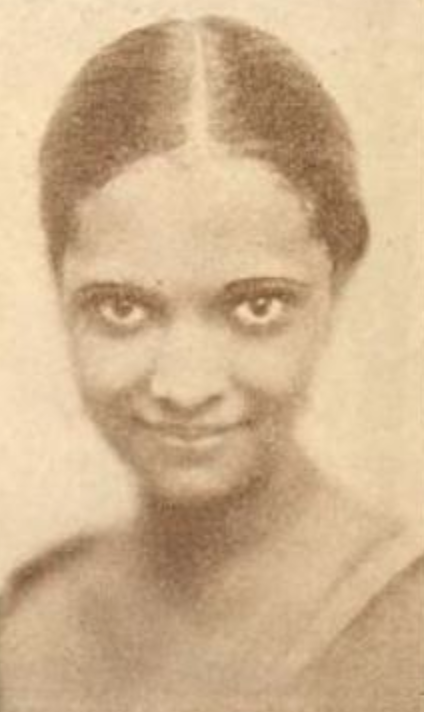
Nina Mae McKinney, from a 1929 publication

=== Early career (1927–1929) ===
In January 1928, Lew Leslie's Blackbirds Revue played at Les Ambassadeurs Club. McKinney probably joined after her 16th birthday as a chorus girl in the Blackbirds Beauties under the name Nina Mae McKinney. The show itself was renamed Blackbirds of 1928 and moved to the Liberty Theatre, where it ran for 518 successful performances, starring Bill "Bojangles" Robinson and Adelaide Hall.

In October 1928, King Vidor arrived in New York searching for actors for his upcoming all-Black talking picture, Hallelujah!. Actor Daniel L. Haynes and dancer Honey Brown, from Club Highland, were to be the stars. During casting sessions in Harlem, McKinney walked back and forth in front of the building to gain the attention of King Vidor. He said, "Nina Mae McKinney was third from the right in the chorus. She was beautiful and talented and glowing with personality." In Hollywood she first had just a minor role in the film.

On March 20, 1929, McKinney, Haynes and Victoria Spivey appeared on Radio-KHJ. She performed songs from Blackbirds: "I Must Have That Man" and "Diga Diga Doo".

On May 20, 1929, McKinney was engaged to James Marshall, director of Harlem's Lafayette Theatre, and signed a five-year contract with MGM, the first African American performer to do so.

McKinney returned to New York and worked as a domestic for Springs again, who was caring for his ailing wife. McKinney appeared at the Embassy Theatre on August 20 for the premiere of Hallelujah!, which was an immense success. McKinney was the first African-American actress to hold a principal role in a mainstream film, which had an African American cast. Vidor was nominated for a directing Oscar and McKinney was praised for her role. Vidor told audiences "Nina was full of life, full of expression, and just a joy to work with. Someone like her inspires a director."

The following day, McKinney wed Marshall, but she returned to California in September, moving into the Hotel Dunbar and traveling daily to Culver City to film The Bugle Sounds, Manhattan Serenade and They Learned About Women. Few Hollywood movies had mixed race casts, and it was difficult for African Americans to find enough work in the creative side of the film industry. Hollywood was reluctant to make McKinney into a glamorized icon like the white actresses of the time, despite her beauty; film production codes prohibited suggestions of miscegenation, so filming interracial romance was impossible.

=== Europe (1930–1938) ===
By late-January 1930, McKinney had grown tired of MGM. She had begun failing to appear for promotional appearances, especially if her name was not in lights above the marquee. That spring, her new manager, Al Munro, sports writer of The Chicago Whip, arranged a tour of the Midwest for her. She was to appear in Chicago, Detroit, St. Louis, Kansas City, Cleveland and Pittsburgh. In late March, she left for Chicago to appear in a vaudeville show, Circus at the 35th Regiment Armory. The following month, she moved on to the Metropolitan Theatre for two weeks. During this tour, on April 9, McKinney appeared on two of Reverend A.W. Nix's Black Diamond Train to Hell sermons (Part 5 and 6), which was recorded at the Brunswick Recording Library. Horrible reviews followed McKinney, declaring her a money-hungry, star struck girl who had grown to despise her own race. McKinney claimed to have filed a libel suit during 1930 against a white reporter, Elisabeth Goldbeck, who stated that McKinney had "repudiated her race" in an article that composed for the Motion Picture Classic magazine.

In January 1934, jazz pianist Garland Wilson and McKinney departed for a tour of the Cote d'Azur, beginning in Nice, France, which ended up being a successful five-month project. The partnership enjoyed a success-filled month in Prague immediately afterwards. On March 2, she arrived in Budapest and appeared at the Parisian Grill-Bar for another month. She arrived in Athens, Greece, to open on April 7 at the Femina Cinema, where she was billed as the Black Garbo (prior to this, she had been referred to only as the Black Clara Bow).

Instead, on July 15, 1934, McKinney opened at London's Alhambra Theatre, where she remained for the next two weeks. In the meantime, she also appeared in Kentucky Minstrels (released in the United States as Life is Real), her first British film, alongside Scott & Whaley and Debroy Somers Orchestra.

During summer 1934, alongside Paul Robeson, McKinney began filming, Zoltan and Alexander Korda's Bosambo (later known as Sanders of the River) at the Denham Film Studios near London. The film, which was partly set in Africa, would portray African culture positively, which Robeson had made a condition of his participation in the project. McKinney and Robeson later discovered the film was re-edited without their knowledge, and that their roles in the film had been significantly downgraded.

=== Return to the USA and race films (1938–1960) ===
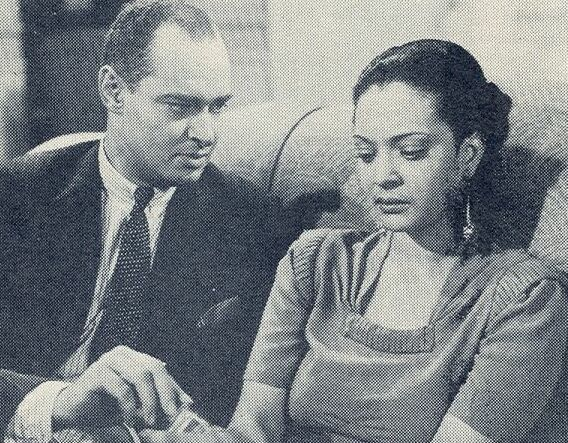
Jack Carter-Nina Mae McKinney in The Devil's Daughter (1939)

Destitute and desperate, McKinney returned to Hollywood. She was in the Jamaica located movie The Devil's Daughter released in 1939. She also appeared in July 1944 appearing alongside Merle Oberon, playing a servant girl in the film Dark Waters, and Irene Dunne in Together Again as a nightclub attendant.

== Death and legacy ==
After 1960, McKinney lived in New York City.

On May 3, 1967, she died as a result of a heart attack at the age of 54 at the Metropolitan Hospital in Manhattan.

Her funeral was at the Little Church Around the Corner.

In 1978, McKinney received a posthumous award from the Black Filmmakers Hall of Fame for her lifetime achievement.

In 1992, the Walter Reade Theater at Lincoln Center in New York City replayed a clip of McKinney singing in Pie, Pie Blackbird (1932) in a combination of clips called Vocal Projections: Jazz Divas in Film.

The film historian Donald Bogle discusses McKinney in his book Toms, Coons, Mulattoes, Mammies, And Bucks—An Interpretive History Of Blacks In American Films (1992). He recognized her for inspiring other actresses and passing on her techniques to them. He wrote "her final contribution to the movies now lay in those she influenced."

In 2019, McKinney was one of the featured obituaries in "Overlooked", a series from The New York Times where the editorial staff attempted to correct a longstanding bias in reporting by publishing obituaries for historical minorities and women.

== Broadway credits ==
Date	Production	Role	Notes
1928	Blackbirds of 1928	Chorus line	
September 6 – November 26, 1932	Ballyhoo of 1932	Performer	

== Filmography ==
Year	Title	Role	Notes
1929	Hallelujah!	Chick	
1929	Manhattan Serenade	Herself	Short subject
1930	They Learned About Women	Specialty singer	Uncredited
1931	Safe in Hell	Leonie, the hotel manager	
1932	Pie, Pie Blackbird	Miss Nina	with the Nicholas Brothers, Eubie Blake, and Noble Sissle.
1932	Passing the Buck		
1934	Kentucky Minstrels	Herself	with Debroy Somers and his band
1935	Sanders of the River	Lilongo, African chief's wife	with Paul Robeson.
1935	Reckless	Specialty singer	
1936	The Lonely Trail	Dancer	Uncredited
1936	Broadway Brevities: The Black Network	Herself	Short subject
1938	Gang Smashers	Laura Jackson, cabaret singer	
1938	On Velvet	Herself	Short subject
1939	The Devil's Daughter	Isabelle Walton	
1939	Straight to Heaven	Ida Williams	
1940	Swanee Showboat	Herself	Short subject
1944	Dark Waters	Florella	
1944	Together Again	Maid in nightclub powder room	Uncredited
1945	The Power of the Whistler	Flotilda, Constantina's maid	Uncredited
1946	Mantan Messes Up	Nina	
1946	Night Train to Memphis	Maid	
1947	Danger Street	Veronica	
1949	Pinky	Rozelia, jealous girlfriend	
1950	Copper Canyon	Theresa	Uncredited
1954	Mistica	Minga	Uncredited
