= Service with a Smile (1934 film) =

- Directed by: Roy Mack
- Written by: Eddie Moran; A. Dorian Otvos
- Starring: Leon Errol; Maxine Doyle; Herbert Evans; Marie Wells; Harry Seymour; Frank Darien; Billy Bletcher
- Cinematography: Ray Rennahan Filmed in Technicolor
- Music by: Leo F. Forbstein
- Distributed by: Warner Bros.
- Release date: July 28, 1934
- Running time: 17 minutes
- Country: United States
- Language: English

Service with a Smile is a 1934 Vitaphone short comedy film directed by Roy Mack and released by Warner Bros. on July 28, 1934, that was the first live-action film in full color (three-strip Technicolor). This film debuted in theaters a few weeks before the Pioneer Pictures film La Cucaracha (also produced in three-strip Technicolor).

== Plot ==
Leon shows off his new "deluxe" service station, complete with a golf course, food service, and a staff of "chorus girls" pumping gas.
