= A. Dorian Otvos =

Hungarian-American writer and composer (1893–1945)

- Born: Adorjan Dorian Otvos; 11 October 1893; Hungary
- Died: 25 August 1945 (aged 51); United States
- Occupations: Composer; writer

Adorjan Dorian Otvos (11 October 1893 – 25 August 1945) was a writer and composer in Hollywood. He was born in Hungary and worked on several Broadway productions as well as Vitaphone short films, often as a co-writer.

His mother died when he was young.

His library of Rudyard Kipling works was auctioned in 1939.

== Filmography ==
- Smash Your Baggage (1932)
- Pie Pie Blackbird (1932)
- That Goes Double (1932)
- Pleasure Island (1933), co-wrote story with Burnet Hershey
- Rufus Jones for President (1933)
- Seasoned Greetings (1933)
- Use Your Imagination (1933)
- Service with a Smile (1934) co-wrote
- The Black Network (1936)
- College Dads (1936)
- The Double Crossky (1936)
- Sheik to Sheik (1936)
- Sweethearts and Flowers (1936)
- The Blonde Bomber (1936)
- The Backyard Broadcast (1936)
- Trouble in Toyland (1936)
- Love in a Bungalow (1937)
- Behind the Mike (1937)
- Merry-Go-Round of 1938 (1937)
- Flirting with Fate (1938) co-wrote story
- The Devil's Party (1938)
- Goodbye Broadway (1938)
