= Roy Mack (director) =

American film director

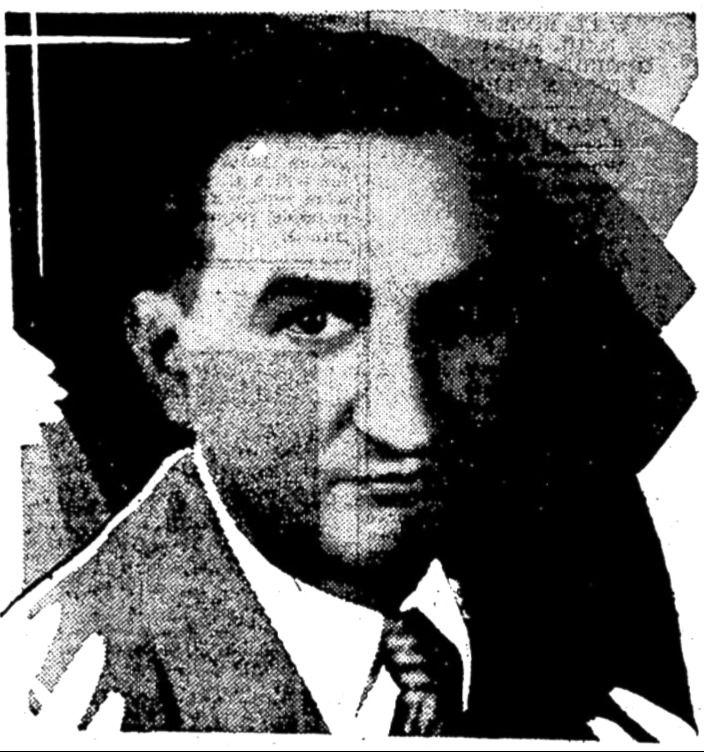
- From a 1930 magazine
- Born: Leoy McClure; December 14, 1889; New Brunswick, New Jersey, United States
- Died: January 16, 1962 (aged 72); Los Angeles, California, United States
- Occupation: Film director
- Years active: 1930–1942

Roy Mack (December 14, 1889, - January 16, 1962,), born Leroy McClure, was an American director of film shorts, mostly comedy films, with 205 titles to his credit.

Born and raised in New Brunswick, New Jersey, he attended New Brunswick High School.

== Selected filmography ==
- Bubbles (1930) with Judy Garland
- The Silent Partner (1931)
- Pie, Pie Blackbird (1932) with the Nicholas Brothers and Eubie Blake
- The Red Shadow (1932) a short version of The Desert Song with Alexander Gray and Bernice Claire
- Rufus Jones for President (1933) with Ethel Waters and Sammy Davis Jr.
- That's the Spirit (1933) with Noble Sissle and an all black cast
- Pleasure Island (1933) with Richard Powell
- Paree, Paree (1934) with Bob Hope
- Good Morning, Eve! (1934) early Technicolor short, with Leon Errol
- Service With a Smile (1934) another early Technicolor short with Leon Errol
- An All-Colored Vaudeville Show (1935)
- Ups and Downs (1937)
- Frances Carroll & The Coquettes (1939) featuring drummer Viola Smith
- One for the Book (1940)
- Double or Nothing (1940)
- Hillbilly Blitzkrieg (1942)
