= An All-Colored Vaudeville Show =

- Directed by: Roy Mack
- Starring: Adelaide Hall; Nicholas Brothers; Eunice Wilson
- Production company: Warner Bros.
- Release date: 1935
- Country: United States

An All-Colored Vaudeville Show is an extant American film featuring vaudeville acts released in 1935. Acts include Adelaide Hall, the Nicholas Brothers, and Eunice Wilson backed by the Five Racketeers. It was distributed by Warner Brothers. It was produced by Vitaphone. The nine-minute film was directed by Roy Mack. The film includes a performance by the Nicholas Brothers.
