= Cliff Hess =

American composer

"Doodle Bug" (1915) audio file

Clifford Hess, better known as Cliff Hess, (June 19, 1894 – June 8, 1959) was an American songwriter, composer, lyricist, and pianist. He began his career as pianist while a young teenager working on passenger riverboats on the Mississippi River. He met Irving Berlin while working in the Chicago branch of the music publisher Waterson, Berlin & Snyder, Inc. By 1911 he was working as Berlin's secretary, and appeared on Broadway that year with Berlin as his accompanist in performances of his songs. He served as Berlin's secretary until 1918 and was largely responsible for not only notating Berlin's songs into sheet music, but also editing his works into playable keys and simplifying works to make them accessible for commercial sale. After leaving Berlin, he became a successful songwriter in his own right with many tunes being recorded for Victor Records and Columbia Records. He also wrote songs for films during the 1930s and some of his tunes were interpolated into musicals.

== Life and career ==
Clifford "Cliff" Hess was born in Cincinnati, Ohio on June 19, 1894. While a young teenager, he began his career as a pianist on passenger riverboats traversing the Mississippi River. He got a job in the Chicago branch of the music publisher Waterson, Berlin & Snyder, Inc. where he met the songwriter Irving Berlin. By 1911 he was working as Berlin's secretary, and was performing on Broadway as Berlin's accompanist with Berlin singing his own tunes in the Spring of 1911. Hess lived in a New York City apartment with Berlin during their time working together, and they would often stay up late at night working on music together.

Hess served as Berlin' s secretary until 1918. Berlin, while an exceptional pianist, played entirely by ear and could not read or write music notation. It was Hess's job to translate what Berlin played by ear onto the page in order to make printable sheet music possible. However, Hess's job went beyond simple transposition and he was essentially Berlin's music editor. Their process involved Hess transposing Berlin's songs into easier keys and simplifying tunes so that they could be more accessible for commercial sale. Musicologist Charles Hamm noted that Hess likely contributed significantly to the finished product of Berlin's tunes written during this period. Hamm stated the following:

"It would be impossible to document precisely what Hess contributed to the final versions of Berlin's songs. The piano accompaniments were, in all likelihood, mostly his work. Lyrics and tunes were Berlin's inventions, and various accounts agree that he knew what harmony he wanted as well."

In addition to his work with Berlin, Hess also worked for Tin Pan Alley music publishing firms, and as an executive for multiple record labels. He became a member of ASCAP in 1919. His most successful works as a songwriter were "Homesickness Blues" (1917) and "Freckles. Other songs he wrote included "Don't You Remember the Day", "Huckleberry Finn", "I'm in Heaven (When I'm in My Mother's Arms)", "I Used to Call Her Baby", "Sweet Marimba", "When Alexander Takes His Ragtime Band to France", and "While the Years Roll By". Many of his songs were recorded for Victor Records and Columbia Records.

Hess's song "Cairo" was interpolated into the 1916 Broadway musical Step This Way, and his song "Marimba" was used in The Greenwich Village Follies of 1920. He wrote the score to the 1933 film Mystery of the Wax Museum, and wrote all of the songs in the 1936 musical film The Black Network.

Hess lived in East Orange, New Jersey for several years. He died in Cameron County, Texas on June 8, 1959.

== Songs ==
- "Doodle Bug" (1915)
- "Homesickness Blues" (1917)
- "Freckles"
- "Don't You Remember the Day"
- "Huckleberry Finn"
- "I'm in Heaven (When I'm in My Mother's Arms)"
- "I Used to Call Her Baby"
- "Sweet Marimba"
- "Cairo"
