= Fayard Nicholas =

American choreographer, dancer, and actor (1914–2006)

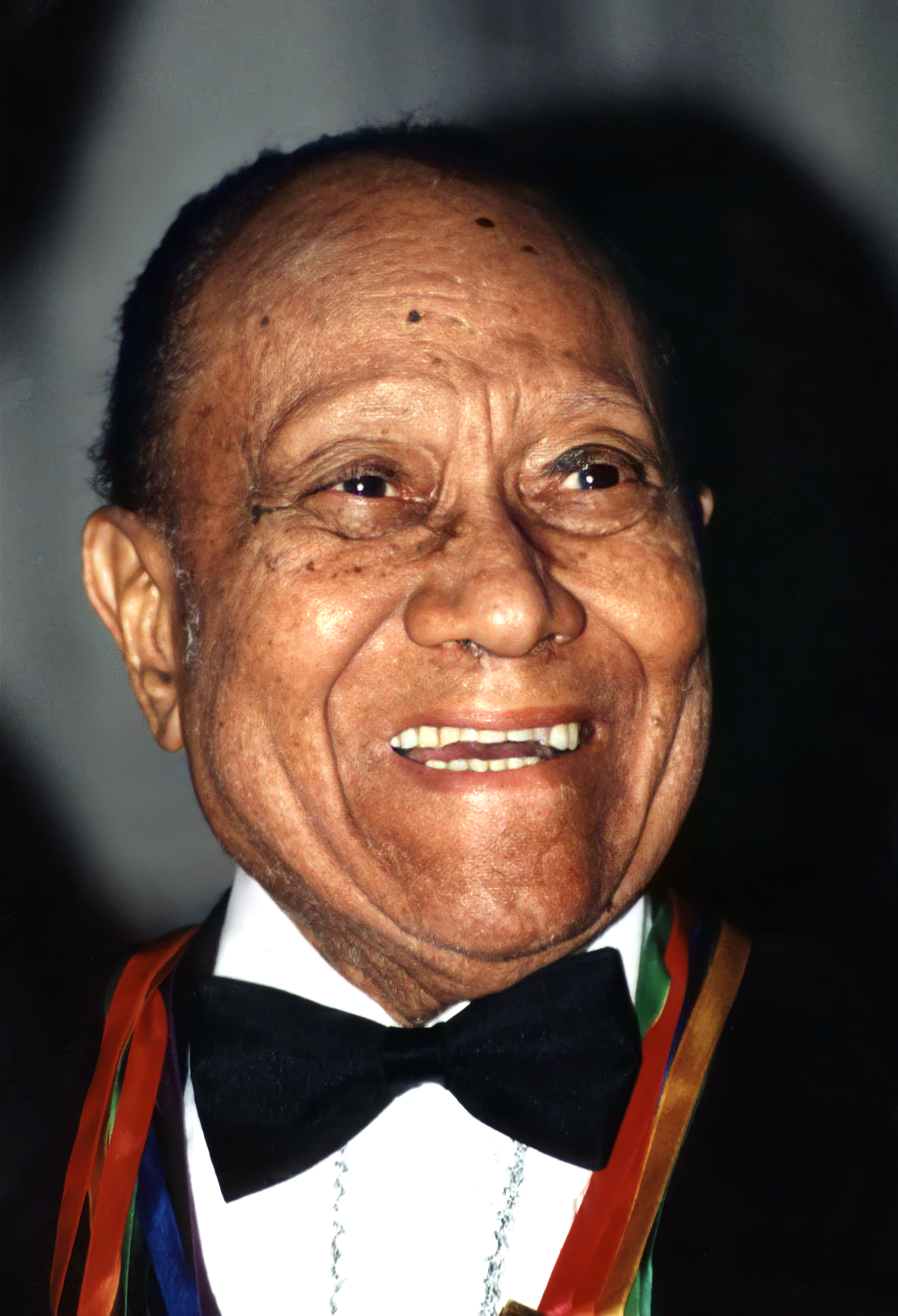
- Nicholas in 2000
- Born: Fayard Antonio Nicholas; October 20, 1914; Mobile, Alabama, U.S.
- Died: January 24, 2006 (aged 91); Los Angeles, California, U.S.
- Occupations: Choreographer; dancer; actor; singer
- Years active: 1935–1991
- Spouse(s): Geraldine Pate (m. 1942; div. 1955) Victoria Barron (m. 1955, divorced) Barbara January (m. 1967; died 1998) Katherine Hopkins (m. 2000)
- Relatives: Harold Nicholas (brother)
- Awards: Hollywood Walk of Fame
- Website: nicholasbrothers.com

Fayard Antonio Nicholas (October 20, 1914 – January 24, 2006) was an American choreographer, dancer and actor. He and his younger brother Harold Nicholas made up the Nicholas Brothers tap dance duo, who starred in the MGM musicals An All-Colored Vaudeville Show (1935), Stormy Weather (1943), The Pirate (1948), and Hard Four (2007). The Nicholas brothers also starred in the 20th Century-Fox musicals Down Argentine Way (1940), Sun Valley Serenade (1941), and Orchestra Wives (1942).

== Early life ==
Nicholas was born in Alabama, but grew up primarily in Philadelphia, Pennsylvania. He learned to dance while watching vaudeville shows with his brother while their musician parents played in the orchestra. His father, Ulysses D. Nicholas, was a drummer and his mother, Viola Harden Nicholas, was a pianist.

== Career ==
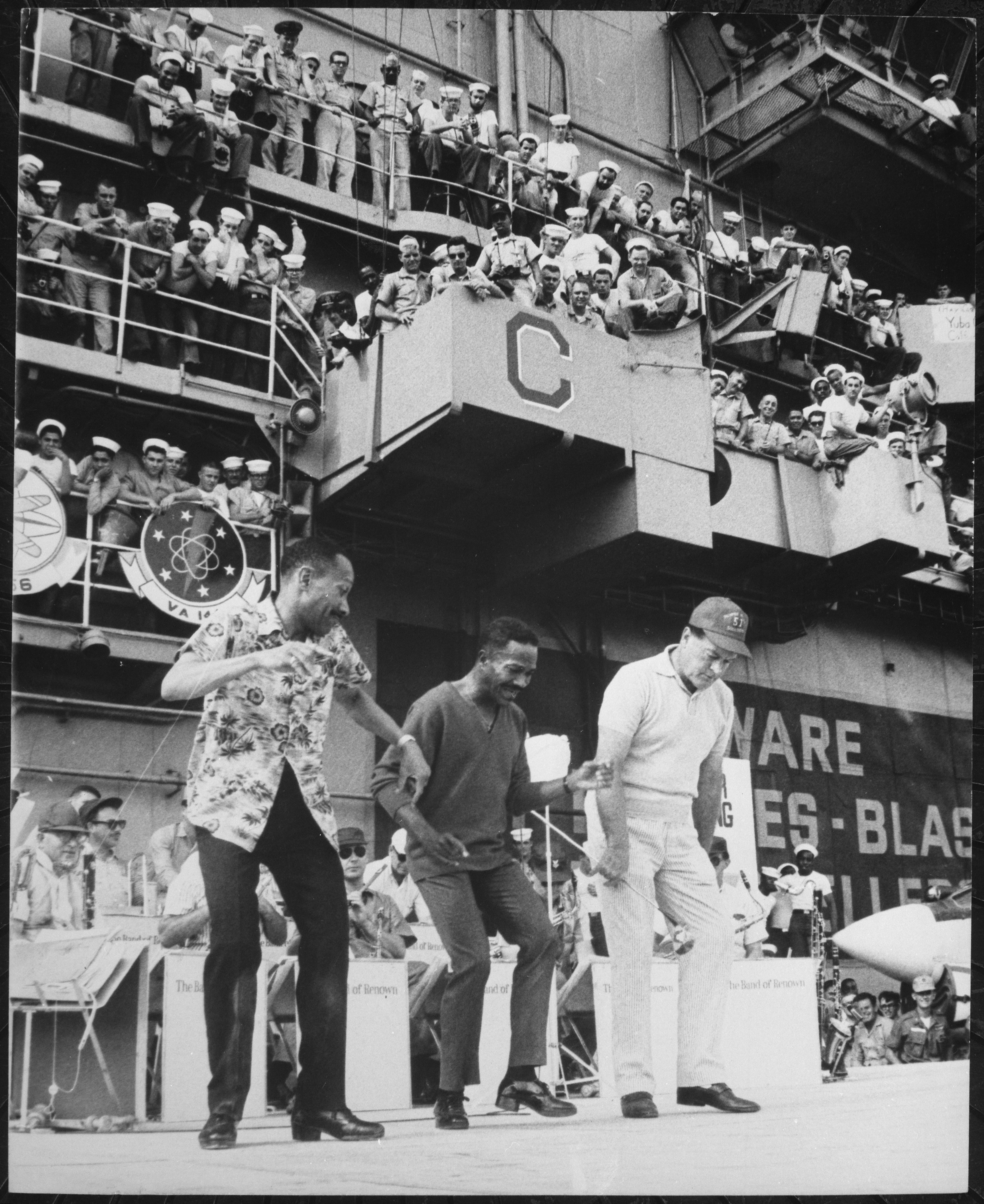
Fayard Nicholas dances with Harold Nicholas and Bob Hope, 1965

In 1932, when he was 18 and his brother was only 11, they became the featured act at Cotton Club in New York City. The brothers earned fame with a unique style of rhythm tap that blended "masterful jazz steps with daredevil athletic moves and an elegance of motion worthy of ballet". They appeared in the Ziegfeld Follies on Broadway and in London they worked with jazz choreographer Buddy Bradley. The performances led them to a career in film. Nicholas appeared in over 60 films, including the 1943 musical Stormy Weather with their signature staircase dance.

His career was interrupted from 1943 to 1944 when he served in the U.S. Army during World War II. Nicholas achieved the rank of Technician fifth grade while in WWII.

After his dance career ended, Nicholas and his wife, Katherine Hopkins Nicholas, embarked on a lecture tour discussing dance. In 2003, Nicholas served as "Festival Legend" at the third "Soul to Sole Tap Festival" in Austin, Texas.

Nicholas was inducted into the National Museum of Dance C.V. Whitney Hall of Fame in 2001.

== Personal life ==
Fayard was married three times. He remained friends with his first wife, Geraldine Pate, after their divorce. His second wife was Barbara January, and they remained married until her death in 1998. He married dancer Katherine Hopkins in 2000. He was a member of the Baháʼí Faith. Fayard died of pneumonia following a stroke in 2006 at age 91. His widow Katherine died in 2012.

== See also ==
- List of dancers
