= Nicholas Brothers =

American entertainment act

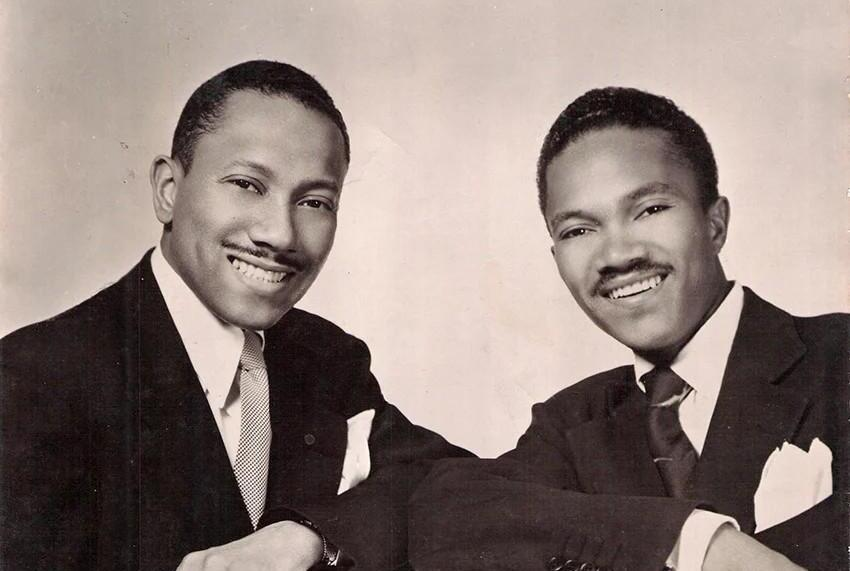
- The Nicholas Brothers: Fayard (left) and Harold

Background information
- Origin: Philadelphia, Pennsylvania, U.S.
- Genres: Tap dance, flash dance
- Works: see Filmography
- Years active: c. 1930s–1950s
- Award: see Awards and honors
- Past members: Fayard Nicholas; Harold Nicholas

The Nicholas Brothers were an entertainment act composed of brothers Fayard (1914–2006) and Harold (1921–2000), who excelled in a variety of dance techniques, primarily between the 1930s and 1950s. Best known for their unique interpretation of a highly acrobatic technique known as "flash dancing", they were also considered by many to be the greatest tap dancers of their day, if not all time. Their virtuoso performance in the musical number "Jumping' Jive" (with Cab Calloway and his orchestra) featured in the 1943 movie Stormy Weather has been praised as one of the greatest dance routines ever captured on film.

Growing up surrounded by vaudeville acts as children, they became stars of the jazz circuit during the Harlem Renaissance and performed on stage, film, and television well into the 2000s. Diminutive in size, they were appreciated for their artistry, innovation, and soaring leaps.

== Early lives ==
Fayard Antonio Nicholas was born August 28, 1914, in Mobile, Alabama, and Harold Lloyd Nicholas was born March 17, 1921, in Winston-Salem, North Carolina, to Viola Harden (maiden; 1893–1971), a pianist, and Ulysses Dominick Nicholas (1892–1935), a drummer.

The Nicholas Brothers grew up in Philadelphia, the sons of college-educated musicians who played in their own band at the Standard Theater. At the age of three, Fayard would always sit in the front row while his parents worked, and by the time he was ten, he had seen most of the great African-American vaudeville acts—particularly the dancers, including such notables of the time as Alice Whitman, Willie Bryant, and Bill Robinson. The brothers were fascinated by the combination of tap dancing and acrobatics. Fayard often imitated their acrobatics and clowning for the kids in his neighborhood.

Neither Fayard nor Harold had any formal dance training. Fayard taught himself how to dance, sing, and perform by watching and imitating the professional entertainers on stage. He then taught his younger siblings, first performing with his sister Dorothy as the Nicholas Kids, later joined by Harold. Harold idolized his older brother and learned by copying his moves and distinct style. Dorothy later opted out of the act, and the Nicholas Kids became known as the Nicholas Brothers.

The brothers moved to Philadelphia in 1926. As word spread of their talent, the Nicholas Brothers became known around Philadelphia. They were first hired for a radio program, The Horn and Hardart Kiddie Hour, and then by other local theatres such as the Standard and the Pearl. When they were performing at the Pearl, the manager of The Lafayette, a New York vaudeville showcase, saw them and immediately wanted them to perform for his theater.

== Stage Career ==
In 1932, they became the featured act at Harlem's Cotton Club when Harold was 11 and Fayard was 18. They astonished their mainly white audiences dancing to the jazz tempos of "Bugle Call Rag"; they were the only entertainers in the African-American cast allowed to mingle with white patrons. They performed at the Cotton Club for two years, working with the orchestras of Lucky Millinder, Cab Calloway, Duke Ellington, and Jimmy Lunceford. During this time, they made their uncredited movie debut, in the 1932 short Pie, Pie Blackbird, featuring Eubie Blake and his orchestra. The brothers attributed their success to their unique style of dancing—a hybrid of tap dance, ballet, and acrobatics sometimes called "acrobatic dancing" or "flash dancing"—which was greatly in demand during this time.

The brothers made their Broadway debut in the Ziegfeld Follies of 1936. Their act at the Follies stopped the show so consistently that Fannie Brice would regularly joke: "Do you think we can talk now?". The Follies led to a tour of England with a production of "Blackbirds" that gave them an opportunity to see several of the great European Ballet companies. They impressed the choreographer, George Balanchine, who invited them to appear in Richard Rodgers and Lorenz Hart's Babes in Arms 1937. With Balanchine's training, they learned many new stunts. Their talent led many to presume they were trained ballet dancers.

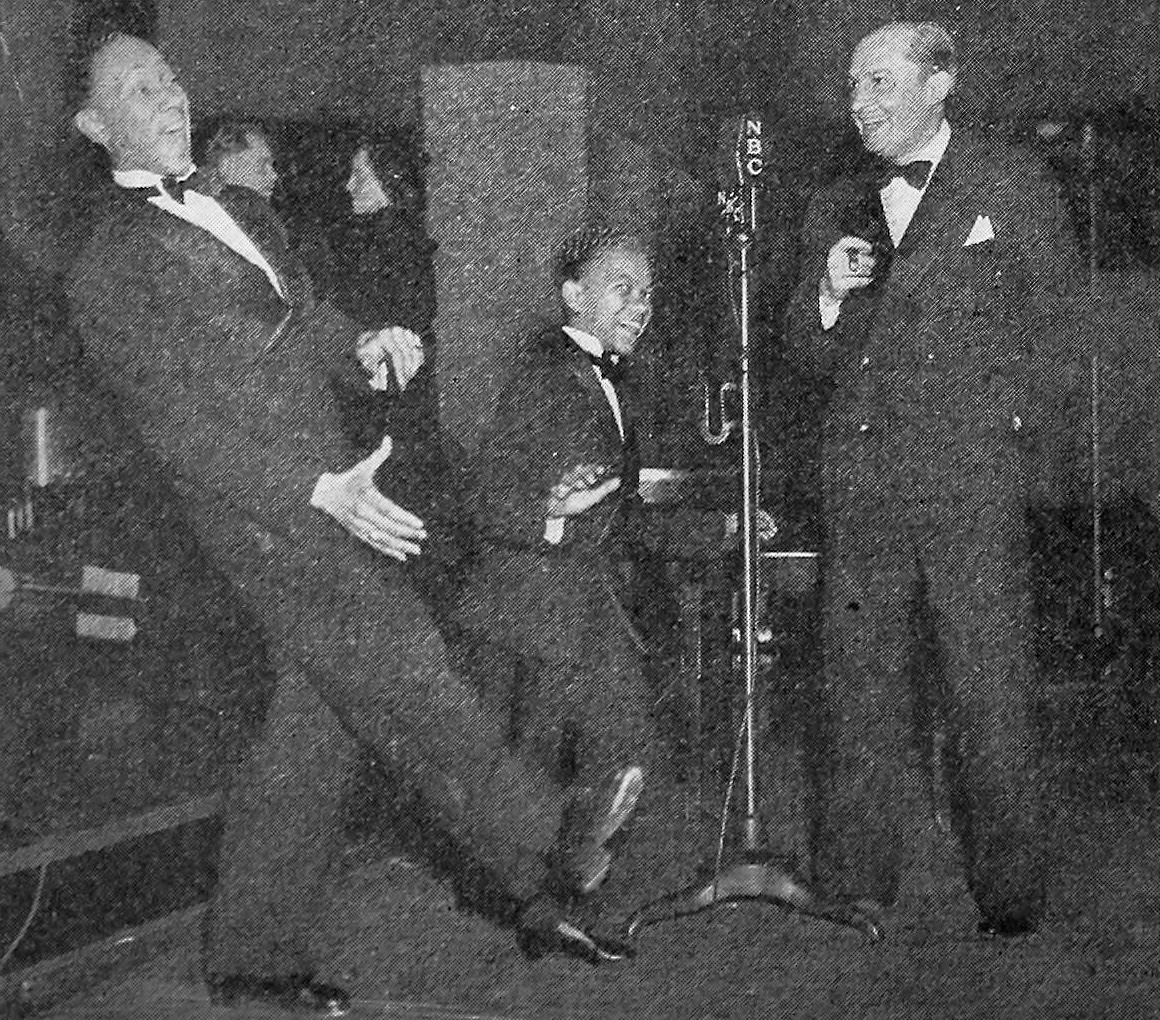
Ben Bernie with the Nicholas Brothers, photographed during a Radio City broadcast (Radio Mirror magazine, April 1936)

By 1940, they had moved to Hollywood and for several decades divided their time between movies, nightclubs, concerts, Broadway, television, and extensive tours of Latin America, Africa, and Europe. In 1948 they gave a royal command performance for the King of England at the London Palladium. Later, they danced for nine different presidents of the United States. They appeared in most of the major nightclubs and theaters in America, guest starred on virtually every popular TV variety show from the 1950s through the 1970s, and performed for the troops in Vietnam in 1965.

== Film Career ==
The Nicholas Brothers made their screen debut in Pie, Pie, Blackbird (1932), an all-black musical short directed by Roy Mack and starring Nina Mae KcKinney. Harold Nicholas briefly broke out on his own for the Disney short Stoopnocracy (1933)—where he got to show off his Cab Calloway impression—as well as the independently produced pre-code drama The Emperor Jones (1933), a landmark film starring Paul Robeson. Producer Samuel Goldwyn saw them at the Cotton Club and invited them to California to be a part of Kid Millions (1934). The duo reunited again for the Warner Bros. Vitaphone short An All-Colored Vaudeville Show (1935). Also directed by Roy Mack, the Nicholas Brothers are one of five acts in the film.

In 1940, they were contracted to the Twentieth Century Fox studio and made six films there. Stormy Weather (1943) remained their personal favorite. It features their now-classic, breathtaking staircase routine, their last appearance on film as a duo.

Carmen Miranda, something of a sensation on Broadway and therefore a subject for exploitation in this appearance, performs four characteristic numbers but plays no part in the film save as herself. Charlotte Greenwood contributes comedy and a bit of dancing, both in the vein she is known for, but it is the Nicholas Brothers, Negro dance team, which stops the show.

— Down Argentine Way (20th Century-Fox) – Review, Motion Picture Herald

Despite their continued success, the Nicholas Brothers faced problems at their home studio. They wanted more involvement in their movies but according to a Los Angeles Times article on the brothers, "Because of racial prejudice, they appeared as guest artists, isolated from the plot, in many of their films. This was a strategy that allowed their scenes to be easily deleted for screening in the Jim Crow-era South". Due to various reasons, their contract with Fox was not renewed.

After World War II, the Nicholas Brothers took a break from filmmaking and went on tour performing throughout the southern Southern belt and the Caribbean. They returned to the big screen in what would be their last major film together, the Vincente Minnelli directed MGM musical The Pirate (1948). They joined Gene Kelly for the "Be a Clown" number despite resistance from the studio that Kelly would dance with two black performers. Arthur Freed believed that because the story was set in the Caribbean and not in the United States that audiences wouldn't be as opposed to seeing Gene Kelly perform with two black dancers. Harold Nicholas, who disliked rehearsal, put very little effort into Kelly's practice runs which angered the star. The story goes that Kelly accused Harold of not knowing the choreography and Harold responded by doing the entire routine by himself without missing a beat. In all, they have made over thirty films.

== Style and moves ==
The brothers were particularly known for their expressive use of their hands and arms while dancing, particularly tap. One of their signature moves was to leapfrog down a long, broad flight of stairs, completing each step with a split. Its best remembered performance is in the finale of the movie Stormy Weather (1943). In that routine, the Nicholas Brothers leapt exuberantly across the orchestra's music stands and danced on the top of a grand piano in a call and response act with the pianist, to the tune of "Jumpin' Jive". Fred Astaire once told the brothers that this dance number was the greatest number he had ever seen on film. The choreographer Nick Castle said, "Just do it. Don't rehearse it, just do it." And so it was done, unrehearsed and in one take, which relieved Harold Nicholas because he did not want to do the rigorous routine over and over all night.

In another signature move, they would rise from a split without using their hands. Gregory Hines declared that if their biography were ever filmed, their dance numbers would have to be computer-generated because no one now could emulate them. Ballet legend Mikhail Baryshnikov once called them the most amazing dancers he had ever seen in his life.

== Teaching ==
The Nicholas Brothers taught master classes in tap dance as teachers-in-residence at Harvard University and Radcliffe at Ruth Page Visiting Artists. Among their known students are Debbie Allen, Janet Jackson, and Michael Jackson. Several of today's master tap dancers have performed with or been taught by the brothers: Dianne Walker, Sam Weber, Lane Alexander, Mark Mendonca, Terry Brock, Colburn Kids Tap/L.A, Channing Cook Holmes, Chris Baker, Artis Brienzo, Chester Whitmore, Darlene Gist, Chris Scott, Tobius Tak, Carol Zee, and Steve Zee.

== Legacy ==
In 1991, the Nicholas Brothers received Kennedy Center Honors in recognition of their six decades of achievements. A year later, a documentary film, We Sing & We Dance, celebrated their careers and included tributes from Mikhail Baryshnikov, Gregory Hines, MC Hammer, and Clarke Peters. In 1994, members of the cast of Hot Shoe Shuffle also paid them tribute.

On April 8, 1998, Carnegie Hall hosted a lifetime tribute to Fayard and Harold, with the event "From Harlem to Hollywood: A Tribute to the Nicholas Brothers". Both brothers were in attendance along with a sold-out audience. In honor of the brothers' exquisite tap dance legacy and artistic contributions as a dance team in Hollywood films, the night included a veritable Who’s Who in tap dance and entertainment, presenting and performing. On a large screen, the brothers’ full tap dance scene in the film "Stormy Weather" was shown.

== Personal lives ==
=== Fayard ===
Fayard married four times. His marriage to Geraldine Pate lasted from 1942 until their divorce in 1955. That year, he married Mexican dancer Victoria Barron. As of May 1960, that marriage remained intact, with "Vicky" also working alongside Fayard professionally. He married Barbara January in 1967, the same year he converted to the Baháʼí Faith, and they remained together until her death in 1998. He married Katherine Hopkins in 2000.

He died on January 24, 2006, of pneumonia contracted after a stroke. His memorial service, presided over by Mary Jean Valente of A Ceremony of the Heart, was standing-room only and featured personal tributes, music, dance, and one last standing ovation.

Two of Fayard's granddaughters dance as the "Nicholas Sisters" and have won awards for their performances.

=== Harold ===
Harold was married three times. From 1942 to 1951, he was married to singer and actress Dorothy Dandridge, with whom he had one child, Harolyn Nicholas, who was born with a severe intellectual disability. In Paris, he had a son, Melih Nicholas, with his second wife Elayne Patronne. He lived on New York's Upper West Side for twenty years with his third wife, producer and former Miss Sweden, Rigmor Alfredsson Newman. Harold died July 3, 2000, of a heart attack following minor surgery.

== Filmography ==
- Pie, Pie Blackbird (1932) (short subject) (uncredited)
- The Emperor Jones (1933) (Harold Nicholas)
- Syncopancy (1933) (short subject) (Harold Nicholas)
- Kid Millions (1934)
- An All-Colored Vaudeville Show (1935) (short subject)
- Coronado (1935)
- The Big Broadcast of 1936 (1935)
- The Black Network (1936) (short subject)
- My American Wife (1936)
- Babes in Arms (1937) (Although the Nicholas Brothers were in the 1937 stage play, they were not in the movie, which came out in 1939)
- Calling All Stars (1937)
- My Son Is Guilty (1939)
- Down Argentine Way (1940)
- Tin Pan Alley (1940)
- The Great American Broadcast (1941)
- Sun Valley Serenade (1941)
- Orchestra Wives (1942)
- Stormy Weather (1943)
- Take It or Leave It (1944)
- The Reckless Age (1944) (Harold Nicholas)
- Carolina Blues (1944) (Harold Nicholas)
- Dixieland Jamboree (1946) (short subject)
- The Pirate (1948)
- Pathe Newsreel (1948)
- I'm in the Revue (1950)
- El Misterio del carro express (1953)
- El mensaje de la muerte (1953)
- Musik im Blut (1955)
- Bonjour Kathrin (1956)
- L'Empire de la nuit (1963) (Harold Nicholas)
- The Liberation of L.B. Jones (1970) (Fayard Nicholas)
- Uptown Saturday Night (1974) (Harold Nicholas)
- That's Entertainment! (1974) (archive footage)
- Brother, Can You Spare a Dime? (1975) (archive footage)
- Disco 9000 (1976) (Harold Nicholas)
- That's Dancing! (1985) (archive footage)
- Tap (1989) (Harold Nicholas)
- That's Black Entertainment (1990) (archive footage)
- The Five Heartbeats (1990) (Harold Nicholas)
- "Alright" (Janet Jackson song) and video (1990)
- The Nicholas Brothers: We Sing and We Dance (1992)
- Funny Bones (1995) (Harold Nicholas)
- I Used to Be in Pictures (2000)
- Night at the Golden Eagle (2002) (Fayard Nicholas)
- Broadway: The Golden Age, by the Legends Who Were There (2003)
- Hard Four (2005)

== Awards and honors ==
- Harold received the DEA Award from the Dance Educators of America.
- Harold received the Bay Area Critics Circle Award (Best Principal Performance, Stompin' at the Savoy).
- Harold received the Harbor Performing Arts Center Lifetime Achievement Award.
- An honorary doctorate from Harvard University was awarded to both brothers.
- Black Filmmakers Hall of Fame (1976)
- Ellie Award (1984), National Film Society for both brothers
- Apollo Theater's Hall of Fame (1986), First Class Inductees for both brothers
- Ebony Lifetime Achievement Award (1987) for both brothers
- Fayard Nicholas received Broadway's 1989 Tony Award for Best Choreographer for Black and Blue along with his collaborators Cholly Atkins, Henry LeTang, and Frankie Manning.
- Scripps American Dance Festival Award
- Kennedy Center Honors in 1991 for both brothers who were in attendance
- The National Black Media Coalition Lifetime Achievement Award (1992)
- Flo-Bert Award (1992)
- New York's Tap Dance Committee, Gypsy Award (1994)
- A star on the Hollywood Walk of Fame at 7083 Hollywood Blvd (1994)
- Professional Dancer's Society, Dance Magazine Award of (1995)
- The 1998 Samuel H. Scripps American Dance Festival Award for Lifetime Achievement in Modern Dance
- National Museum of Dance Mr. & Mrs. Cornelius Vanderbilt Whitney Hall of Fame Inductees (2001)

== Other achievements ==
- The brothers gave a royal command performance for King George VI at the London Palladium in 1948.
- A retrospective of their work in films appeared at the 1981 Academy Awards ceremony.
- During the course of their lives, the brothers danced for nine different presidents of the United States.
- In 2011, the brothers' home movies were selected for preservation in the National Film Registry. Several of these home movies were also preserved by the Academy Film Archive in 2016.

== See also ==
- List of dancers
