= Flavia Arcaro =

American actress (1876–1937)

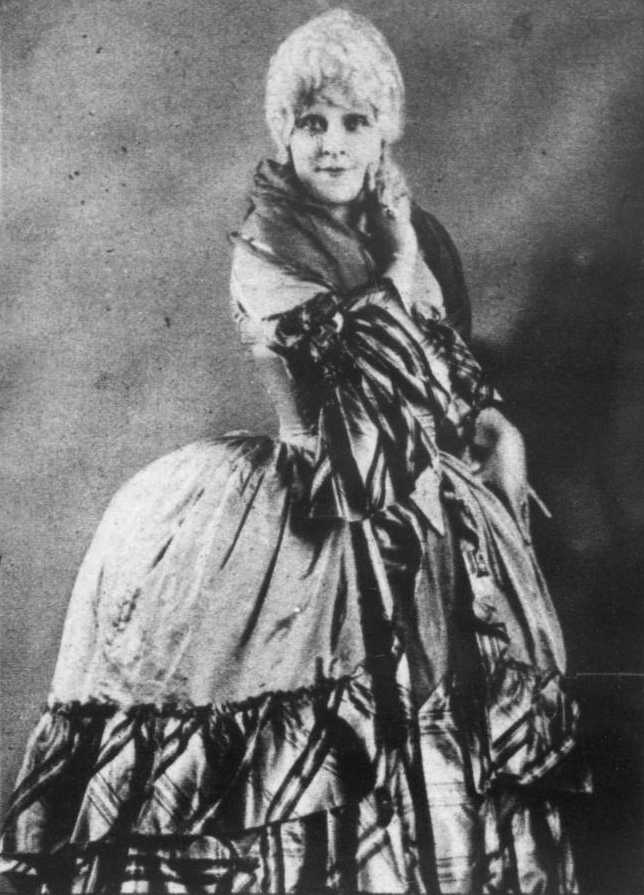
- Born: Flavia Head; June 22, 1876; Mexico, Texas, U.S.
- Died: April 8, 1937 (aged 60); The Bronx, New York City
- Occupation: Actress

Flavia Arcaro, born Flavia Head, (June 22, 1876 – April 8, 1937) was an American contralto, and stage and silent film actress. She had a lengthy career on Broadway that encompassed everything from opera to musical theatre to plays. Born in Mexico, Texas, and raised in Minonk, Illinois, she trained as a singer for three years in South Bend, Indiana. She made her stage debut in 1903 with the Terrace Garden Opera Company in New York City, and three years later made her Broadway debut as Lady Anne in Reginald De Koven's The Student King. While she did perform in some grand operas in her early career, she mainly performed in light opera and musical theatre; including as Aurelia Popoff in the original Broadway production of The Chocolate Soldier (1909–1910).

In 1915–1916 Arcaro took time away from her stage career to make silent films; appearing in ten short films during that period. She later appeared in a handful of sound films released between 1932–1934. Her final appearance as an actress was as Madame Frankie Lee in the Broadway production of Queer People in 1934. She died in The Bronx in 1937.

== Early life and education ==
The daughter of William Head and his wife Rhoda Head, Flavia Head was born in Mexico, Texas on June 22, 1876. She grew up in Minonk, Illinois where her father worked in the coal mining industry and her brother worked as a barber. She attended school in Minonk and won the Demorest silver medal in a local talent contest in 1890. She married musician Antonio Arcaro in Miller County, Arkansas on April 11, 1894. Her husband was a pianist, and she would occasionally perform with him in concerts as a violinist.

Arcaro performed excerpts from works by William Shakespeare in a variety theatre program at the Grand Opera House in Bryan, Texas in 1895. In 1897 she returned to her hometown of Minonk where she and her husband performed at Schuttler's Opera House. In 1899 she worked as a teacher of elocution in Royal Center, Indiana, and organized and taught a summer school of the arts in Logansport, Indiana. She and her husband gave a concert in Fort Wayne, Indiana on October 14, 1901.

She trained as an opera singer under professor W. Preston MacHenry in South Bend, Indiana for three years.

== Career ==
Aracaro began her career in opera. Newspapers labeled her voice as a contralto. In 1903 she became a member of the Terrace Garden Opera Company (TGOC) which was in residence at the Terrace Garden (TG; also known as the Lexington Opera House) on 58th St in New York City. She made her stage debut in Jacques Offenbach's Les brigands; portraying the mezzo-soprano role of Fragoletta at the TG in May 1903. Later that year she appeared with the TGOC as Siebel in Charles Gounod's Faust, Artemisia in Johann Strauss II's Der lustige Krieg, Lady Pamela in Daniel Auber's Fra Diavolo, and the title role of Franz von Suppé's Boccaccio.

In 1905 Arcaro portrayed a Flower Maiden in a touring production of Richard Wagner's Parsifal that was produced by Henry W. Savage. The following year she starred in another show produced by Savage; portraying Lady Anne in the world premiere of Reginald De Koven's The Student King at the Studebaker Theater in Chicago on May 21, 1906. She subsequently toured in this production, which included a run on Broadway at the Garden Theatre from December 1906 through January 1907. She subsequently returned to Broadway as Madame du Tertre in André Messager's The Little Michus (1907), Gwendolyn in The Newlyweds and Their Baby (1909), and Aurelia Popoff in the tremendously successful production of The Chocolate Soldier (1909–1910).

Arcaro continued to appeared with regularity on the New York stage during the 1910s. Her Broadway credits during the early part of this decade included Baroness von Graven in Georg Jarno's The Girl and the Kaiser (1910–1911), Mme. Joyant in Robert Hood Bowers's The Red Rose (1911), Madame Leontine in The Man from Cook's (1912), Vendetta in Two Little Brides (1912), and the Amber Witch in Manuel Klein's Hop o' My Thumb (1913–1914). Her obituary in The New York Times singled out this latter performance as one of her more memorable ones from her stage career.

In 1915–1916 Arcaro took a break from her stage career to work as a silent film actress. Her film credits included appearance in the short films The Ace of Death (1915, as Theresa),, The Devil's Darling (1915),, Sunshine and Tempest (1915, as Nancy),, The Cup of Chance (1915, as Hope's Mother),, The Unsuspected Isles (1915, as Lores) The Plunderer (1915, as Lily), The Vivisectionist (1915, as The Actress), Capital Punishment (1915, as Vivian Baxley), The Secret Agent (1915, as Mrs. Vanderlind), and Paying the Price (1916, as Vera Desmond). After this she returned to Broadway as Mrs. Pyne in Jerome Kern's Have a Heart (1917), and Mrs. Fishbacker in Sigmund Romberg's The Magic Melody (1919–1920).

In the 1920s Arcaro's Broadway performances included a variety of parts in Jack Lait and J. Fred Coots's revue Spice of 1922, Mme. Burque in Maude Fulton's The Humming Bird (1923), Lady Jane in Gilbert and Sullivan's Patience (1924–1925), and Mrs. Robert Murray in the hit musical Dearest Enemy (1925–1926). In 1927 she portrayed Lady Bracknell in Oh, Ernest!; a musical adaptation of Oscar Wilde's The Importance of Being Earnest mounted at the Royal Theatre. In 1928 she portrayed Julia in Vincent Lawrence's play In Love With Love at the Cosmopolitan Theatre. In 1929 she portrayed roles in the Broadway revivals of two operettas by Victor Herbert: Pauline in Sweethearts and Mme. Cecile in Mlle. Modiste.

At the end of her career, Arcaro appeared in three sound short films: The Naggers on Four Wheels – No Brakes (1932), Come to Dinner (1934, as Carlotta Prance) and the Broadway Brevities short Fifi (1933). Her final stage appearances included performances in three Broadway plays: The Sergeant's Wife in Nikolai Gogol's The Inspector General (1930), Helen Brooks in August L. Stern's Hired Husband (1932), and Madame Frankie Lee in John Floyd's Queer People (1934).

Arcaro died on April 8, 1937 in The Bronx at the House of Calvary located at the intersection of Featherbed Lane and Macombs Road.
