= Three Freshmen =

The Three Freshmen. Regan, left. Carter, center Reid, right.

The Three Freshmen were an American Vaudeville acrobatic team active during the 1930s and 1940s. The performers were Freddie Reid, Louis Regan, and Ken Carter. The trio sometimes performed as “Regan, Carter & Reid.”

== History ==
The members of the Three Freshmen began practicing acrobatics recreationally together in Cleveland, Ohio. They impressed a coach at a Cleveland YMCA, who suggested that they develop a professional act. Reid responded enthusiastically: “That’s like drawing a salary for eating candy.” The Freshmen initially performed straight acrobatics, but transitioned to comedic acrobatics after a positive audience reaction to a performance accident when Ken jumped for Louis’ shoulders, missed, and landed on the rear of his lap.

== Career ==
The Three Freshmen (Reid, bottom; Carter, middle; Regan, top), during a performance

The Freshmen performed as “comedy acrobats.” Their act was described as a “knockabout comedy routine,” featuring “unusual hand-balancing feats and acrobatics performed with an easy grace that ma[de] the hard stunts look easy,” “season[ing] their turn with just enough nonsense to give it distinction.” One journalist described the Three Freshmen's performance as follows: "The performers fell all over the stage, bounced and did it again with never an interruption in their patter.” The act included slapstick elements, “knockabout antics, with many falls and face slappings.”

The Freshmen toured widely, not merely across the United States but also in Canada, Europe, and South America. Their performances had various titles, including “Never a Dull Moment” and "Bored of Education." They often performed as the top-billed act in revues. Freshman Freddie Reid sometimes doubled as emcee for the larger performance.

The Freshmen performed with a wide range of celebrities, including Sally Rand, Ronald Reagan, and Red Skelton.

The Freshmen also toured with Benny Davis as part of his “Stardust Revue.” In 1938, they appeared with Davis in the Vitaphone short “Stardust,” one of the movie shorts in the Broadway Brevities series.

== Critical reception ==
The Three Freshmen were favorably received by critics of the period. In 1942, Billboard Magazine reported that the Freshmen “[a]ll but stopped the show” with their “top acro routines” combined with “a lot of clowning and mugging.” Other reviewers opined that the Freshmen’s act was “loaded with thrills and laughs” and “[s]ome of the finest tumbling ever witnessed”; “[s]ide-splitting”; and “st[ole] the show.”

One Billboard reviewer opined that “[t]heir straight acrobatics [we]re very good, and the comedy [wa]s interspersed in just the right proportion to make a well-balanced offering.” The team presented “acro and hand-balancing patterns that [we]re neat, fast, and pretty entertaining. Bring in several bits of comedy which serve as good relief for their straight and stock tricks.”
