= Johnny Green =

American songwriter (1908–1989)

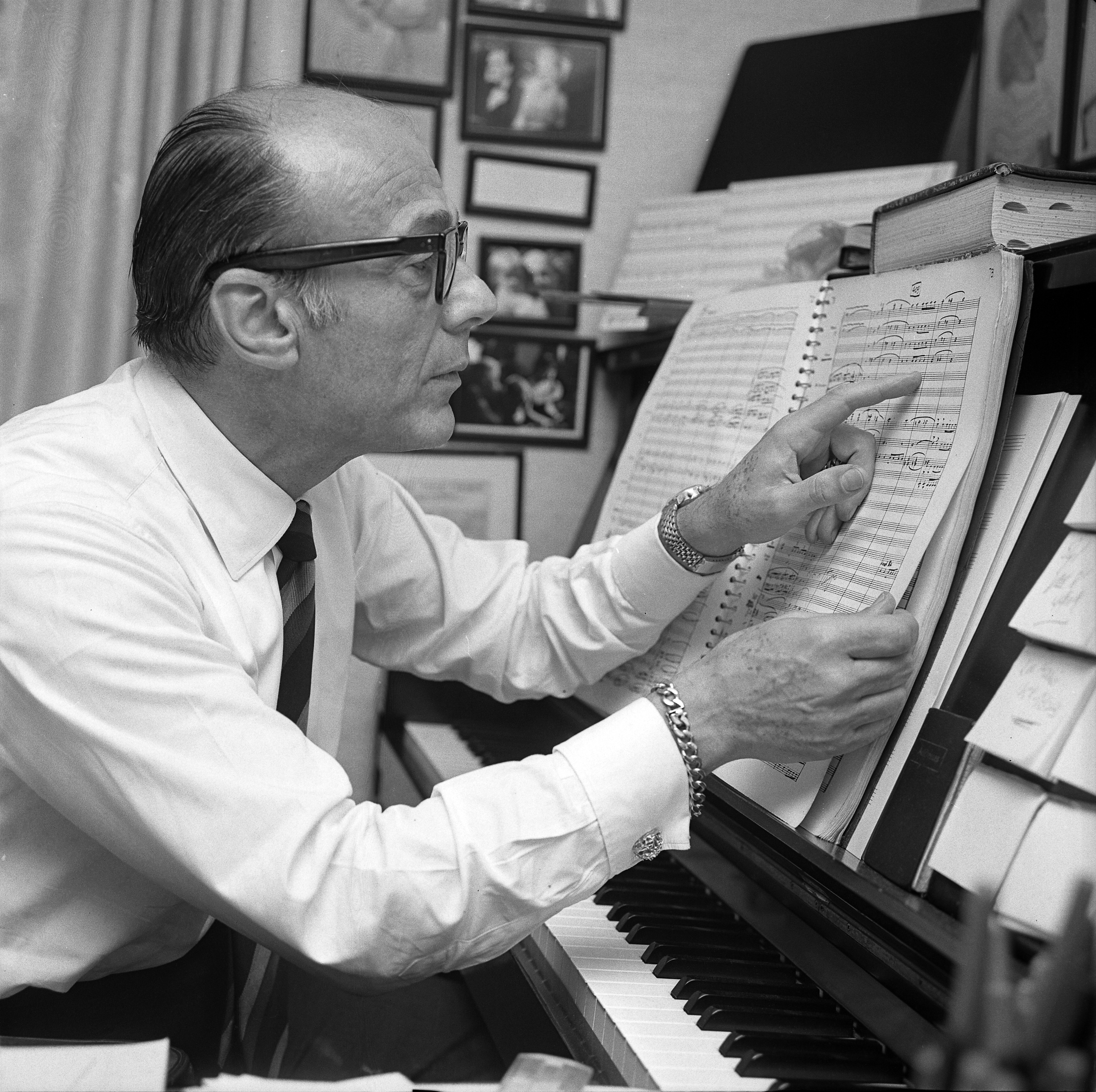

Background information
- Born: John Waldo Green; October 10, 1908; New York City, U.S.
- Died: May 15, 1989 (aged 80) Beverly Hills, California, U.S.
- Occupations: Composer, Conductor
- Instruments: Piano, Trombone
- Years active: 1930–1989
- Label: Paramount Pictures

John Waldo Green (October 10, 1908 – May 15, 1989) was an American songwriter, composer, musical arranger, conductor and pianist. He was given the nickname "Beulah" by colleague Conrad Salinger. His most famous song was one of his earliest, "Body and Soul" from the revue Three's a Crowd. Green won four Academy Awards for his film scores and a fifth for producing a short musical film, and he was inducted into the Songwriters Hall of Fame in 1972. He was also honored with a star on the Hollywood Walk of Fame.

== Early years ==
John Waldo Green was born in New York City, the son of musical parents Vivian Isidor Green (1885–1940) and Irina Etelka Jellenik (1885–1947), a.k.a. Irma (or Erma) Etelka Jellenik. Vivian and Irina wed in 1907 in Manhattan.

John attended Horace Mann School and the New York Military Academy, and was accepted by Harvard at the age of 15, entering the university in 1924. His musical tutors were Herman Wasserman, Ignace Hilsberg and Walter Spalding. Between semesters, bandleader Guy Lombardo heard Green's Gold Coast Orchestra and hired him to create dance arrangements for his nationally famous orchestra. His first song hit, Coquette (1928), was written for Lombardo (with Carmen Lombardo, Guy's brother, and lyricist Gus Kahn).

John's father, Vivian, compelled him to take a job as a stockbroker. Disliking the job, and encouraged by his wife, the former Carol Faulk, John left Wall Street to pursue a musical career.

== Career ==
Green wrote a number of songs which have become jazz standards, including "Out of Nowhere" and "Body and Soul". He wrote the scores for various films and TV programs. His earliest songs appeared with the billing "John W. Green," a styling he reverted to in the 1960s. After that anyone addressing "Johnny" was put right with the statement, "You can call me John – or you can call me Maestro!"

At the beginning of his musical career, he arranged for dance orchestras, most notably Jean Goldkette on NBC. He was accompanist/arranger to musicians such as James Melton, Libby Holman and Ethel Merman. It was while writing material for Gertrude Lawrence in 1930 that he composed "Body and Soul", the first recording of which was made by Jack Hylton & His Orchestra eleven days before the song was copyrighted.

Between 1930 and 1933, Green was the arranger and conductor for Paramount Pictures and worked with such singers as Ethel Merman, Gertrude Lawrence and James Melton. He composed many of his hit standards during the 1930s, including Bing Crosby's first number one hit recording, "Out of Nowhere" (1931, co-authored with Edward Heyman), "Rain Rain Go Away" (1932), "I Cover the Waterfront", "You're Mine You", "I Wanna Be Loved" (all 1933), "Easy Come Easy Go" and "Repeal The Blues" (both 1934).

After 1933, Green had his own orchestra which he used to perform around the country. He also, until 1940, conducted orchestras for the Jack Benny and Philip Morris records and radio shows. He wrote the score to the 1942 Broadway musical Beat the Band which featured lyrics by George Marion Jr..

=== Carnegie Hall and Astoria Studios ===
Nathaniel Shilkret and Paul Whiteman commissioned Green to write larger works for orchestra, such as "Night Club (Six Impressions for Orchestra with Three Pianos)", introduced by Whiteman on January 25, 1933, at Carnegie Hall. Green was at piano "one," and Roy Bargy and Ramona played the other two pianos. During the early 1930s, Green also wrote music for numerous films at Paramount's Astoria Studios, conducted in East Coast theatres, and toured vaudeville as musical director for Buddy Rogers. During his two and a half years at Paramount Astoria, he was able to learn more about film scoring from veterans Adolph Deutsch and Frank Tours.

=== London, radio, and recordings ===
Green spent much of 1933 in London, where he contributed songs to both Mr. Whittington, a musical comedy for Jack Buchanan at the London Hippodrome, and Big Business, the first musical comedy ever written for BBC Radio.

On Green's return to the U.S.A. early in 1934, William S. Paley, president of the Columbia Broadcasting System and an investor in New York's St. Regis Hotel, encouraged him to form what became known as Johnny Green, His Piano and Orchestra. (Green added, "My arm didn't need much twisting.") The orchestra, based for a time at the St. Regis, featured Green's piano and arrangements, whose harmony and mood were among the most sophisticated of the day. It made dance records for the Columbia and Brunswick companies, although in the Depression even the most popular records sold only in small numbers.

In 1935, Green starred on CBS's Socony Sketchbook, sponsored by Socony-Vacuum Oil Co. He lured the young California singer Virginia Verrill to headline with him on the Friday evening broadcasts. His regular cast included his band singers Marjory Logan and Jimmy Farrell, essayist Christopher Morley, and stage/screen favorites the Four Eton Boys. A bigger venture yet in commercial radio was The Fred Astaire Hour (a.k.a. The Packard Hour), sponsored by Packard Motors over NBC in 1936 and co-featuring tenor Allan Jones and the comedy of Charles Butterworth. Green's band also backed Astaire on a series of classic recording dates, in both New York and Hollywood, in 1935–1937. He also served as musical director for The Jell-O Program Starring Jack Benny during its 1935–1936 season on NBC.

=== Piano, film, and MGM ===
He continued conducting on radio and in theatres into the 1940s, also leading a dance band for the short-lived Royale Records label in 1939–1940, until he decided to move permanently to Hollywood and work in the film business. Green particularly made an impression at Metro-Goldwyn-Mayer, where in the 1940s, along with orchestrator Conrad Salinger, he was one of the musicians most responsible for changing the overall sound of the MGM Symphony Orchestra, partially through the re-seating of some of the players. This is why the overall orchestral sound of MGM's musicals from the mid-1940s onward is different from the orchestral sound of those made from 1929 until about 1944.

Green was the music director at MGM from 1949 to 1959. He compiled and arranged the MGM Jubilee Overture in 1954, a tour de force. He produced numerous film scores, such as the one for Raintree County in 1957. On loan out to Universal, he composed the songs for the Deanna Durbin musical, "Something in the Wind", one of her last films before retiring.

Nominated for an Oscar thirteen times, he won the award for the musical scores of Easter Parade, An American in Paris, West Side Story, and Oliver!, as well as for producing the short "The Merry Wives of Windsor Overture", which won in the Short Subjects (One-Reel) category in 1954. The short subject featured Green conducting the MGM Orchestra on-screen in the music from the opera of the same name by Otto Nicolai.

After leaving MGM, Green guest-conducted with various orchestras, including the Chicago Symphony Orchestra, Denver Symphony Orchestra, Philadelphia Orchestra, San Francisco Symphony Orchestra, and Hollywood Bowl Orchestra. He also continued to compose the occasional score to films such as Twilight of Honor (1963), Johnny Tiger (1966) and Alvarez Kelly (1966), and contributed the arrangements and musical direction for the critically acclaimed They Shoot Horses, Don't They? in 1969.

He was also hired to create the televised Guinness advertisement known as the "World" ad campaign. He recruited a team which included set designer Grant Major and Oscar-nominated director of photography Wally Pfisher to complete the job.

== Notable works ==
=== Musical director ===
Johnny Green's credits as musical executive, arranger, conductor and composer are considerable, including such films as Raintree County, Bathing Beauty, Easy to Wed, Something in the Wind, Easter Parade (for which he won his first Academy Award), Summer Stock, An American in Paris (which won him his second Academy Award), Royal Wedding, High Society and West Side Story (another Academy Award winner for him). Although Green was musical director on these films, the orchestrations were usually done by someone else - in the case of the MGM musicals, it was usually Conrad Salinger, and in the case of West Side Story, it was Sid Ramin and Irwin Kostal.

=== Conductor ===
As mentioned earlier, Green conducted the orchestra for such famous MGM musicals as An American in Paris, as well as for United Artists' 1961 film version of West Side Story.

In 1965, Green conducted the music for that year's new adaptation of Rodgers and Hammerstein's only musical for television, Cinderella, starring Lesley Ann Warren, Walter Pidgeon, Ginger Rogers, and Stuart Damon.

Johnny Green also adapted, orchestrated and conducted the music for the film Oliver! (1968), based on the hit musical play, and won an Academy Award for his efforts. He also wrote much of the incidental music heard in the film, basing it on Lionel Bart's songs for the original show. His daughter, Kathe, dubbed Mark Lester's singing voice in the film.

=== Accreditations ===
Green was a respected board member of ASCAP. He was a chairman of the music branch of the Academy of Motion Picture Arts and Sciences, leading the orchestra through 17 of the Academy Award telecasts, and a producer of television specials.

== Personal life ==
Green married three times. He had a daughter, actress/singer/songwriter Babbie Green, with actress/consumer advocate Betty Furness, and two daughters, Kim Meglio and actress and singer Kathe Green with MGM "Glamazon" Bunny Waters. Actress Liza Snyder is his granddaughter.

Green, who grew up in a secular Jewish family, was inspired by third wife Bunny Waters to convert to Christianity.

It was during Green's first marriage to Carol Faulk that most of his hit standards were composed. Before the marriage ended in the mid-1930s, Faulk remarked, "We didn't have children, we had songs."

Green was quoted as saying, "As my friend Alan Jay Lerner said, 'Modesty is for those who deserve it.' And I don't."

== See also ==
- Musical film
- Broadway theatre
