= The Plunderer (1915 film) =

1915 film by Edgar Lewis

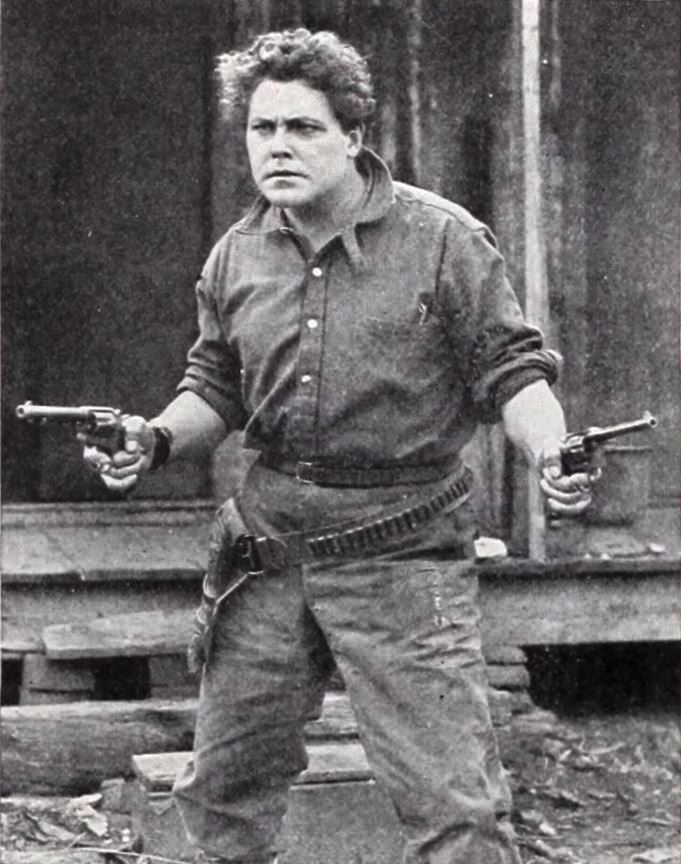
- Film still with William Farnum
- Directed by: Edgar Lewis
- Written by: Edgar Lewis; Garfield Thompson
- Based on: The Plunderer by Roy Norton
- Starring: William Farnum; Claire Whitney
- Cinematography: Frank Kugler
- Production company: Fox Film Corp.
- Distributed by: Fox Film Corp.
- Release date: May 31, 1915
- Running time: (5 reels)
- Country: United States
- Language: Silent (English intertitles)

The Plunderer is a 1915 American film directed by Edgar Lewis based on a 1912 mining novel by Roy Norton. The cast features William Farnum and Harry Spingler as honest miners and Claire Whitney as love interest Joan, daughter of a dishonest miner literally undermining their claim.

== Cast ==
- William Farnum as Bill Matthews
- Claire Whitney as Joan Presby
- Harry Spingler as Dick Townsend
- Elizabeth Eyre as Lily Meredith
- William J. Gross as Old Bells Park
- Riley Hatch as Bully Presby (credited as William Riley Hatch)
- George De Carlton as Dave Thompson
- Henry Armetta as Pedro
- Flavia Arcaro as Lily

== Production ==
The Plunderer was filmed on location in Dahlonega, Georgia, site of the 1829 Georgia Gold Rush.
