= The Man from Cook's =

Musical

The Man from Cook's is a musical with music by Raymond Hubbell and a book and lyrics by Henry Blossom. Based on a story by Maurice Ordonneau, it is set in the cities of Paris and Naples. The work premiered on Broadway on March 25, 1912, at the New Amsterdam Theatre. It closed April 20, 1912 after 32 performances.

The original cast included Walter Percival as Prince Victor de Champagnax, Eleanor Pendleton as Estelle Dubois, Flavia Arcaro as Madame Leontine, Fred Walton as Toto Soulard, Leslie Kenyon as Lord Fitz-Bertie Baffingfone, John Daly Murphy as Zachary Benton, Stella Hoban as Marjorie Benton, Marion Murray as Mrs. Benton, William Pinkham as both Leonard de Biron and Pietro, John J. Dempsey as T. Laurence O'Donnell, Frances Rubens as Mariette, Bessie Durant as Louise, Josephine Harriman as Paula, Daisy Rudd as Marie, Rene Thornton as Floria, J.T. Chaillee as Chauffeur Giacommetti, W. Hobart as Wilhelm, Adele Kornau as Jeanne, and Fred A. Bishop as Johnson.

== Plot ==
The musical begins in a Parisian cafe owned and operated by Madame Leontine who is catering to her regular and most preferred customer, the Prince Victor de Champagnax. In the prince's employ is his servant Toto Soulard who is engaged to Estelle Dubois. The prince spies Marjorie Benton on the street and immediately falls in love with her at first sight. The prince tasks Toto with obtaining the identity of the girl and introducing her to the prince. A comedy of errors ensues as Toto pursues this task.
