= The Avenger (1931 film) =

1931 film

- Theatrical release poster
- Directed by: Roy William Neill
- Written by: George Morgan; Jack Townley
- Produced by: Sol Lesser
- Starring: Buck Jones; Dorothy Revier; Otto Hoffman
- Cinematography: Charles J. Stumar
- Edited by: Edward Curtiss
- Music by: Russell Malmgren (sound engineer)
- Production company: Sol Lesser Productions
- Distributed by: Columbia Pictures
- Release date: March 6, 1931
- Running time: 72 min.
- Country: United States
- Language: English

The Avenger is a 1931 American pre-Code Western film directed by Roy William Neill and starring Buck Jones and Dorothy Revier. The film is loosely based on the exploits of legendary Mexican bandit Joaquin Murrieta, who, in the mid-19th century, went to California and, according to the legend, swore vengeance against Americans and began of a series of robberies in the mining country after being discriminated against by white men.

The film was remade in 1942 as Vengeance of the West, directed by Lambert Hillyer and starring Bill Elliott and Tex Ritter.

== Plot ==
In 1849, Joaquin Murietta is determined to track down the three men, Black Kelly, Ike Mason, and Al Goss, who lynched his brother. As "The Black Shadow," he robs the rich, gives to the poor, and romances the new school teacher Helen Lake.

== Cast ==
- Buck Jones as Joaquin Murietta aka The Black Shadow (as Charles 'Buck' Jones)
- Dorothy Revier as Helen Lake
- Otto Hoffman as Black Kelly
- Sidney Bracey as Windy
- Edward Hearn as Captain Paul Lake
- Walter Percival as Al Goss
- Edward Peil Sr. as Ike Mason
- Paul Fix as Juan Marietta
