= Elizabeth Eyre Pellet =

Colorado state legislator

Minority Leader of the Colorado House of Representatives
- In office 1955–1956

Member of the Colorado House of Representatives
- In office 1948–1964

Personal details
- Born: Elizabeth Eyre; January 15, 1887 South Norwalk, Connecticut
- Died: April 7, 1976 (aged 89)
- Party: Democratic

Elizabeth Eyre Pellet (née Elizabeth Eyre; January 15, 1887 – April 7, 1976) was an American actress, suffragist, and state legislator who served in the state of Colorado. A Democrat, she represented southern Colorado counties of Dolores, Montezuma, and San Miguel in the Colorado House of Representatives, from 1948 to 1964, and as minority leader, from 1955 to 1956. She was the first woman to serve as Colorado's House minority leader.

== Biography ==
Elizabeth Eyre was born in South Norwalk (now part of Norwalk), Connecticut on January 15, 1887. She acted on Broadway and in a silent film, The Plunderer (1915). In New York she also marched as a suffragist. She was married in 1919 to lawyer Robert Lockwood Pellet (1872–1949).

She moved to Colorado with her husband and they operated mines in Rico, Colorado, where she was elected to the school board. She wrote an autobiography titled, That Pellet Woman! (1965, published by Stein and Day). She worked to gain federal support to save and restore the Rio Grande Southern Railroad.

She was inducted into the Colorado Women's Hall of Fame in 2016.
