= Riding High (1943 film) =

1943 film by George Marshall

- Theatrical release poster
- Directed by: George Marshall
- Written by: James Montgomery (play); Art Arthur; Walter DeLeon; Arthur Phillips
- Produced by: Fred Kohlmar
- Starring: Dorothy Lamour; Dick Powell; Victor Moore
- Cinematography: Harry Hallenberger; Karl Struss
- Edited by: LeRoy Stone
- Music by: Charles Bradshaw; Leo Shuken; Victor Young
- Distributed by: Paramount Pictures
- Release dates: November 11, 1943 (United States); December 22, 1943 (New York City)
- Running time: 88 minutes
- Country: United States
- Language: English

Riding High (also known as Melody Inn) is a 1943 American comedy film starring Dorothy Lamour, Dick Powell and Victor Moore, made in Technicolor, and released by Paramount Pictures. It was nominated for the Academy Award for Sound Recording (Loren L. Ryder).

== Plot ==
A city girl goes out West to entertain at a dude ranch and meets a mining engineer and a counterfeiter.

== Cast ==
- Dorothy Lamour as Ann Castle
- Dick Powell as Steve Baird
- Victor Moore as Mortimer J. Slocum
- Gil Lamb as Bob 'Foggy' Day
- Cass Daley as Tess Connors
- Bill Goodwin as Chuck Stewart
- Rod Cameron as Sam Welch
- Glenn Langan as Jack Holbrook
- Milt Britton as himself
- Milt Britton's Band as Themselves
- The Cameron Troupe as Themselves
