= Georgie Tapps =

American tap dancer and actor (1911–1997)

- Tapps in 1942
- Born: Mortimer Alphonse Becker; November 6, 1911; New York, New York
- Died: November 1, 1997 (aged 85); Burbank, California
- Occupations: Tap dancer, actor
- Years active: 1927–1979

Georgie Tapps (born Mortimer Alphonse Becker; 1911–1997) was an American tap dancer. He appeared in a number of films and Broadway productions. He was known for his repertoire of ballet-tap and toured the vaudeville circuit during the 1930s and 1940s, performing in many cabarets and nightclubs.

== Early life ==
Mortimer Alphonse Becker was born on November 6, 1911, in Washington Heights, New York. At the age of seven, his dancing at a church benefit was noticed by a theatrical producer who offered him a scholarship to study ballet. He received a three-year dance scholarship from choreographer Ned Wayburn. Upon its completion, Wayburn offered to sign the 10-year-old Becker to a twenty-year contract, but the offer was rejected by his parents.

When he was 16, he performed at a club in New York City. The club's owner called him "Georgie Tapps". However, a 1945 article in Dance Magazine credits New York politician Sol Bloom with suggesting the nickname.

== Career ==
Alongside Paul Draper, Tapps was among the first tap dancers to popularize dancing to classical music. Tapps travelled the vaudeville circuit and performed in cabarets and nightclubs throughout the 1930s and 1940s.

By the mid-1930s, vaudeville had become less popular, and Tapps started taking roles in Broadway plays. His Broadway debut was in the revue Americana in 1932 where he performed the number "Brother, Can You Spare a Dime". Tapps was friends with Broadway producer George M. Cohan and danced in several of his productions. He danced and had a small speaking role in the 1937 musical I'd Rather Be Right.

Beginning in 1935, Tapps also took film roles. He appeared in the December 4, 1935 film short Katz Pajamas, part of the Broadway Brevities series produced by Warner Bros., and the 1937 musical comedy film Vogues of 1938. That same year Tapps debuted his routine to Maurice Ravel's Boléro, fusing ballet with tap. He performed Bolero at the White House. Afterwards, his weekly salary went from $150 to $750.

Tapps was involved in a legal case by the labor union Actors Equity in 1939.

In 1941 Tapps was cast in the musical Pal Joey by Rodgers and Hart as a replacement for Gene Kelly, who was leaving for Hollywood.

During World War II, Tapps performed for American troops at the American Theatre Wing's Stage Door Canteen venue in New York City in 1943. He was also part of a USO tour in 1945, performing for military personnel in Oahu, Guam, Tinian, and Saipan.

In 1945 Tapps performed for the dinner show of the Persian Room nightclub in the Plaza Hotel. His opening night performance included five encores. Paul Ross, writing for The Billboard, described Tapps routine in a review as including soft-shoe, a ballet-taps routine, a version of Ritual Fire Dance by Manuel de Falla, and a piece incorporating flamenco.

In September 1951 Tapps appeared as a guest on the variety television show This Is Show Business. During the show, guests perform their acts and receive advice from a three-judge panel for show business-related problems. During the show, Tapps' "problem" was that he hadn't been considered for the remake of Pal Joey. After performing his act, the panel informed him that the show's producers had been viewing the telecast and thought that he would be ideal for a role in the remake.

On March 9, 1952, Tapps was a guest on The Colgate Comedy Hour. That year he also participated in a demonstration of the Eidophore, a new cinema video projector. He made an appearance on The Ed Sullivan Show on May 18, 1958.

After the Soviet Union sent a ballet troupe to West Africa in 1959, Tapps was sent there by the United States Dance Panel in 1961. From December 1961 to April 1962 he performed tap routines in Ghana and other countries.

=== Later career ===
Audience interest in tap dancing had begun to decline by the 1950s, and Tapps had difficulty finding employment. He moved to Los Angeles in 1967. There he gave singing and dancing classes and worked as a salesperson in a Beverly Hills clothing store. He later scored a small musical burlesque number in Andy Griffith's 1969 big screen outing, Angel in My Pocket.

Tapps appeared alongside singer Maxine Sullivan in a cabaret program for the Lincoln Center Out-of-Doors Festival in August 1979. He also performed at the Smithsonian Institution in May 1981 as part of a Museum of American History festival.

In 1992 Tapps put on the one-man show Whatever Happened to Georgie Tapps? at the Westwood Playhouse.

Tapps died at St. Joseph's Center Hospital on November 1, 1997, in Burbank, California following a stroke.

Fellow tap dancer Bill Robinson called Tapps "tops in the field of straight tap."
