= Frank and Milt Britton =

Frank Britton
- Born: Frank Louis Wenzel; July 8, 1892; New York City, U.S.
- Died: April 27, 1992 (aged 99); Malverne, New York
- Occupations: Vaudeville performer, jazz musician, local politician
- Years active: c. 1915–1938 (as entertainer)

Milt Britton
- Born: Milton Levy; January 3, 1894; Winston-Salem, North Carolina, U.S.
- Died: April 29, 1948 (aged 54); New York City
- Occupations: Vaudeville performer, jazz musician
- Years active: 1914–1948

Frank and Milt Britton were American vaudeville musicians and slapstick comic entertainers. After initially performing as a duo, numbers in the band grew, and the act worked under various names including The Britton Band. They were known as "America's Craziest Orchestra" in the 1920s and 1930s.

== Career ==
Milt Britton was the stage name of Milton Levy (January 3, 1894 – April 29, 1948), who was born in Winston-Salem, North Carolina and moved to New York as a child. He started playing in vaudeville bands in 1914, and in 1917 formed a duo with New York-born Frank Louis Wenzel (July 8, 1892 – April 27, 1992), who also took the surname Britton as his stage name. Milt and Frank Britton performed on trombone and cornet.

The band expanded with other musicians joining the ensemble, including at various times accordion player Tito Guidotti, trombonist Walter Powell, drummer Tiny Kahn and trumpeter Norman Faye. They often started playing a tune conventionally as serious jazz musicians, before some apparent accident, such as one musician stumbling into another, would set off a chain of events and the band disintegrating into scenes of mayhem and disorder, hitting each other over the head with prop instruments or spraying water. As well as "America’s Craziest Orchestra", they were billed as "The Mad Musical Maniacs". Critic Kevin Whitehead described them as "musical Dadaists of the first order", precursors to Spike Jones, and stated that "the band's level of interpersonal violence makes the Three Stooges look sedate."

They were popular during the 1920s and 1930s, and toured in Europe and South America. The band appeared in the Ziegfeld Follies in 1931, and in the films Moonlight and Pretzels (1933) and Sweet Music (1935). They also performed their act in short films. Frank Britton retired in 1938, but Milt Britton continued with the act and appeared with the band in the 1943 film Riding High (also known as Melody Inn). In 1948, Milt Britton died at the age of 54, from a heart attack shortly after performing at a social function for radio executives in New York.

After retiring from show business, Frank Britton Wenzel – as he was then known – lived in the suburban village of Malverne on Long Island. He opened a restaurant, patronised by vaudeville stars and musicians, and was elected as town mayor in 1951, for a four-year term. He died in Malverne in 1992, at the age of 99.
