= Walter Percival =

American actor, producer, and writer

Walter Percival (May 2, 1887 – January 28, 1934) was an American actor, producer, and writer on the stage and screen. He performed in numerous theater productions before making his film debut in 1918.

In 1909, Percival was part of a company headed by Grace Van Studdiford. His Broadway debut was in A Venetian Romance (1904), and his last Broadway performance was in Find Daddy (1926).

== Stage roles ==
- Eugene Dubois in The Gay Musician (1908)
- Forrest Krider in Will o' th' Wisp (1911), a musical for which he had written the book and lyrics to music by Alfred G. Robyn.
- Prince Victor de Champagnax in The Man from Cook's (1912)

== Filmography ==
- Our Mrs. McChesney (1918)
- The Moral Sinner (1924)
- The Flying Horseman (1926)
- The Big City (1928)
- Lights of New York (1928)
- Lightnin' (1930)
- The Avenger (1931)
- The Homicide Squad (1931)
- Guilty or Not Guilty (1932)
- Cabin in the Cotton (1932)
- Tillie and Gus (1933)

== Sources ==
- Neibaur, James L. (March 23, 2017). The W.C. Fields Films. McFarland. ISBN 9781476665306 – via Google Books.
- Reid, John Howard (December 3, 2005). Movie Westerns: Hollywood Films the Wild, Wild West. Lulu.com. ISBN 9781411666108 – via Google Books.
- Percival, Walter (January 1, 1997). Western Movies: A TV and Video Guide to 4200 Genre Films. McFarland & Company. ISBN 9780786404216 – via Google Books.
- Nash, Jay Robert; Connelly, Robert; Ross, Stanley Ralph (January 3, 1988). Motion Picture Guide Silent Film 1910-1936. Cinebooks. ISBN 9780933997004 – via Google Books.
- Dietz, Dan (2021). "The Man from Cook's". The Complete Book of 1910s Broadway Musicals. Rowman & Littlefield Publishers. p. 149. ISBN 9781538150283.
