= Broadway Brevities =

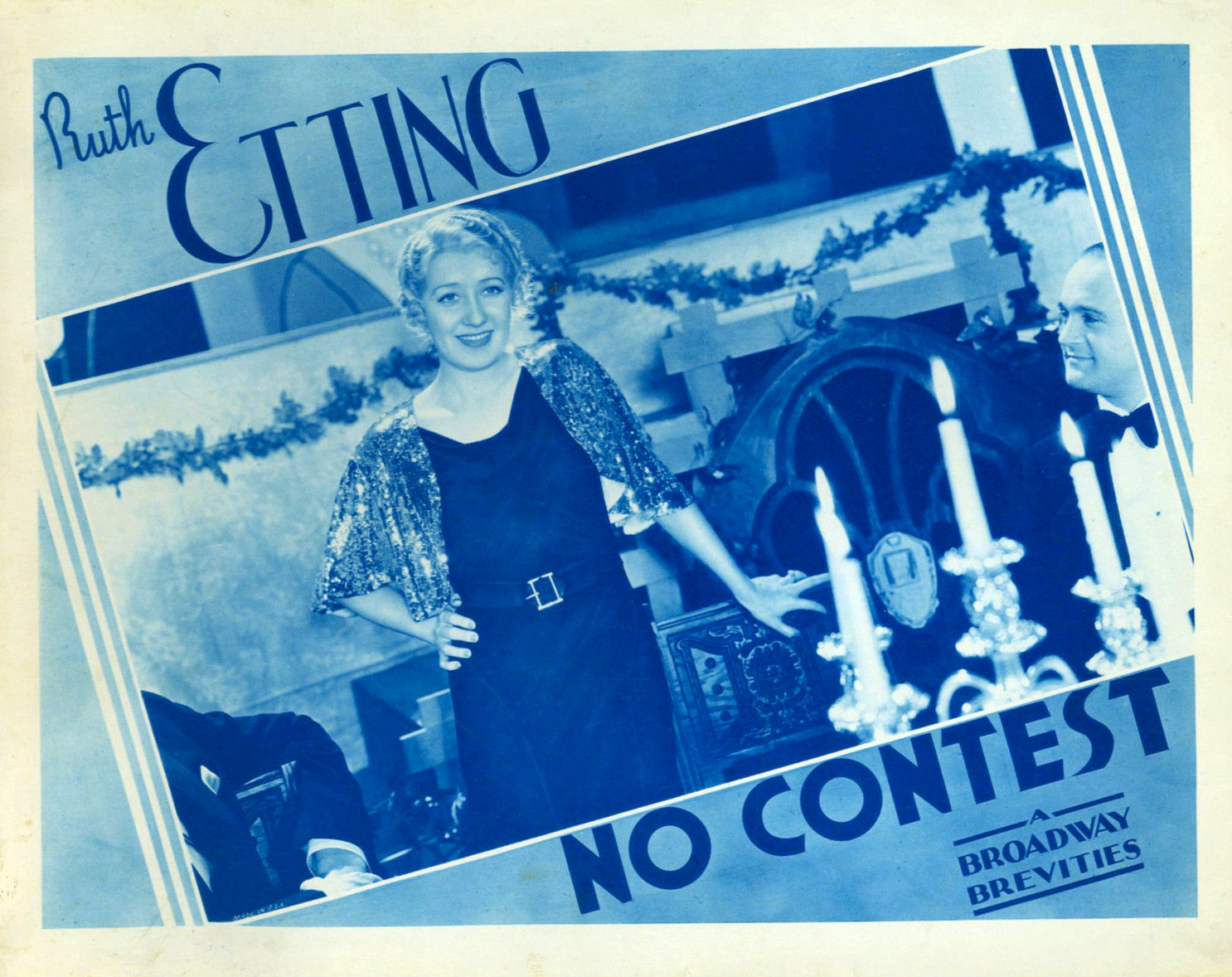
Lobby card for Ruth Etting in No Contest (release 1712–13, May 1934)

Broadway Brevities are two-reel (17–21 minutes long) musical and dramatic film shorts produced by Warner Bros. between 1931 and 1943. The series continued as Warner Specials in later years.

== Overview ==
Other titles used for these black and white two-reel films included “Vitaphone Musicals”, “Broadway Headliners”, “Presentation Revue” (for a couple 1938 releases) and “Blue Ribbon Comedy” for a trio featuring Elsa Maxwell. Usually the trade periodicals grouped them as “Broadway Brevities” for easier marketing purposes.

Many of these glossy productions, a few winning Academy Awards, featured dance spectaculars and mini-dramas with top Broadway theatre or Warner studio stars; famous names included Russ Columbo, Ruth Etting, Hal Le Roy, Bob Hope and Red Skelton. They were filmed at the Vitaphone studio in Brooklyn, New York until 1939, with Samuel Sax as a key producer. Production then moved to Burbank, California.

By the forties, an increasing number were of the documentary genre and the title “Broadway Brevity” was officially dropped in mid-1943 in favor of “Warner Special”. In 1948-1956, many were re-released to theaters under the heading “Classics of the Screen”.

== List of titles ==
A full list is provided below by year of release (but not necessarily the same year filmed). Title is listed first, followed by the major credits and a release date. Sometimes a date reviewed by Film Daily or a copyright date is listed instead.

=== 1931 ===
Title	Director & performers	Review date (Film Daily)	Notes
Old Lace	Roy Mack (director); Ruth Etting	September 20	
The Musical Mystery	Janet Reade, Al Shayne & the Albertina Rasch Girls	November 1	
Words & Music	Roy Mack (director); Ruth Etting & Dan Tompkins	November 8	

=== 1932 ===
Title	Director & performers	Release, copyright or review date	Notes
Footlights	Barbara Newberry, Russ Brown, the Giersdorf Sisters, the Buccaneers & the Albertina Rasch Girls	January 2 (Film Daily review)	
Hello, Good Times! (Cheer Up)	Roy Mack (director); Al Wohlman, Johnny Boyle, Sharp & Minor, the Albertina Rasch Girls	January 17	
Washington, the Man and the Capitol	Clarence Whitehill, A. J. Herbert & others	February 14 (Film Daily review)	"Novelty" (part documentary)
The Imperfect Lover	Jack Haley	February 14 (Film Daily review)	
The Subway Symphony	Frances Langford, Charles Bennington, Joan Abbott & the Dave Gould Girls	March 6 (Film Daily review)	
Sea Legs	Alice Graham, Dorothea James, May Wynne, the David Gould Dancers & King, King & King	March 27 (Film Daily review)	
Artistic Temperament (Artistic Temper)	Roy Mack (director); Ruth Etting, Victor Kilian, Wilfred Lytell, Frank McNellis & Frances McHugh	April	
Absent Minded Abner	Alfred J. Goulding (director); Jack Haley, Olive Shea & Hugh Cameron	May 15 (Film Daily review)	
A Mail Bride	Roy Mack (director); Ruth Etting, Gregory Gaye, Elvira Trabert & Max Stamm	May 29 (Film Daily review)	
What an Idea	Roy Mack (director); Armand Cortes, Harriet Hilliard, the Danny Dare Sisters & Three Harmony Misses	June 11 (Film Daily review)	
A Regular Trouper	Roy Mack (director); Ruth Etting, Wanda Perry, Edward Leiter & Jack Wolfe	June 25 (Film Daily review)	
Passing the Buck	Roy Mack (director); Alexander Gray, Nina Mae McKinney, Dorothy Dell, Victor Kilian, Ed Jerome, Will Vedery Girls & Four Blazers	September 24	
Tip, Tap, Toe	Alfred J. Goulding (director); Hal Le Roy, Mitzi Mayfair, Grace Bradley, Frank McNellis & Helen Goodhue	October 22	
A Modern Cinderella	Roy Mack (director) Ruth Etting, Brian Donlevy, Adrian Rosley and Barbara Child	November 5	Love Me or Leave Me (film) (Greatest Classic Legends Doris Day) DVD
The Red Shadow	Roy Mack (director); Alexander Gray, Bernice Claire, Reg Carrington, Lester Cole Ensemble & Max Stamm	December 3	
Poor Little Rich Boy	Joseph Henabery (director); Mary Lange, Charles Eaton, Harry McNaughton & Gale Sisters	© December 24	

=== 1933 ===
Title	Director & performers	Release, copyright or review date	Notes
Bye-Gones	Alfred J. Goulding (director); Ruth Etting, Frank McNellis, David Burns, Eddie Ryan, Ruth Pine's Tiny Tots & Embassy Boys	© January 14	
Yours Sincerely	Roy Mack (director); Lanny Ross, Nancy Welford, Richard Keene & others	January 28 (Film Daily review)	Billy Rose's Jumbo (film) DVD
Speaking of Operations	Roy Mack (director) Richard Lane, Al Bernard, Gracie Barrie, Three X Sisters, Four Rollickers & Dave Gould Boys & Girls	© February 16	
World's Champ	Joseph Henabery (director); Jack Dempsey, June Gale, Oscar Polk & David Burns, Eddie Roberts	© February 24	
Fifi	Roy Mack (director); Vivienne Segal, Albert Dekker, William Ingersoll, Flavia Arcaro & Charles Judels	March 24 (Film Daily review)	
The Way of All Freshmen	Joseph Henabery (director); Hal Le Roy & Mitzi Mayfair, Cora Witherspoon, Ben Dova & the Admirals	© April 18	
Along Came Ruth	Joseph Henabery (director); Ruth Etting, Chester Chute, Charles Althoff & Sam Wren	May 3	
Sky Symphony	Roy Mack (director); Stoopnagle and Budd, Lanny Ross, the Loomis Twins & the Abbott Girls	May 19 (Film Daily review)	
Pie a la Mode	Roy Mack (director) Herbert Warren, Russ Brown, With the Loomis Sisters, Bernard Gorcey, Polly Walters & the Doree Singers	May 29 (Film Daily review)	
Double Crossing of Columbus	Joseph Henabery (director); Charles Judels, Leona Maricle, Frank McNellis. Jack North, the Rollickers & Mazellos	June 10 (Film Daily review)	
That Goes Double	Joseph Henabery (director); Russ Columbo, Charlotte Wynters, David Burns, Bernice & Emily	June 24 (Film Daily review)	
Crashing the Gate	Joseph Henabery (director); Ruth Etting; John Hamilton, Roy Atwell & the Tony Sarg Marionettes	© July 1	
20,000 Cheers for the Chain Gang	Roy Mack (director); Jerry Bergen, Harry Shannon, James Baskett, Novia & The Pickens Sisters	August 12	I Am a Fugitive from a Chain Gang DVD
The No Man	Roy Mack (director); Hugh O’Connell, Johnny Downs, Gene Lockhart & Kathleen Lockhart	© August 14	
Use Your Imagination	Roy Mack (director); Hal Le Roy, Mitzi Mayfair, The Eton Boys & others	© September 2	The Little Giant (Greatest Gangster Films Edward G. Robinson) DVD
Rufus Jones for President	Roy Mack (director); Ethel Waters, Sammy Davis, Jr.	© September 9	Billed as a “Vitaphone Musical”; available on Warner Bros. Big Band, Jazz & Swing Shorts (Warner Archive) DVD & The Green Pastures (film) DVD
Seasoned Greetings	Roy Mack (director); Lita Grey Chaplin, Sammy Davis, Jr., Carleton Macy, the Village Barn Hill Billys and the Sizzlers	September 23	The Gold Diggers of 1933 DVD
Paul Revere, Jr.	Roy Mack (director); Gus Shy, Janet Reade, Kathleen Lockhart, Gene Lockhart, Bobby Watson, Almira Sessions & Shemp Howard	© October 21	Vitaphone Comedy Collection Vol. 1 (Warner Archive) DVD
The Operator's Opera	Roy Mack (director); Donald Novis, The Eton Boys, Bobby Watson, Chester Chute, Grandon Rhodes & Dawn O’Day	© October 22	
Yeast Is Yeast	Roy Mack (director); Tom Patricola, Charlie Melson, Peggy Singleton (billed as Dorothy McNully) & the Royal Samoans	© November 15	
The Mild West	Joseph Henabery (director); Janet Reade, Olive Borden, Paul Keast	November 18	Vitaphone Cavalcade of Musical Comedy Shorts (Warner Archive) DVD
Let's Play Post Office	Roy Mack (director); Jean Sargent, Eleanor Whitney, Josh Medders & 3 Roberts Brothers	December	
Kissing Time	Roy Mack (director); Jane Froman, George Metaxa, Ralph Sanford, Novia & Philip Ryder	December 16	Lady Killer (1933 film) DVD
Plane Crazy	Roy Mack (director); Dorothy Lee, Art & Morton Havel & others	© December 23	Picture Snatcher DVD

=== 1934 ===
Title	Director & performers	Release, copyright or review date	Notes
A Little Girl with Big Ideas	Joseph Henabery (director); Molly Picon, Jay Velie, Donald McBride, Joan Stevens & Toney Hughes	© January 20	
Picture Palace	Roy Mack (director); Hal Le Roy, Dawn O’Day, William Morrow & Toney Hughes	February 10	
Around the Clock	Roy Mack (director); Norma Terris, Walter Winchell, Lynne Overman, the Four Eton Boys & Jay Brennan	© February 14	
Story Conference	Roy Mack (director); Lillian Roth, Bert Matthews, William Halligan, Vicki Cummings, Grona & Bouvier, the Three Minutes & the Sizzlers	April 7	I'll Cry Tomorrow DVD
Look for the Silver Lining	Roy Mack (director); Dorothy Stone, Stanley Smith, Gus Shy, Olin Howland & Gertrude Niesen	© April 23	
Come to Dinner	Roy Mack (director); Flavia Arcaro, Hershel Magall, Margot Stevenson & Clinton Sundberg	© April 24	Dinner at Eight (film) (Greatest Classic Legends Jean Harlow) DVD
Private Lessons	Roy Mack (director); Hal Le Roy, Dawn O’Day, Dorothy Dare, Dollie Arden & Marie Fay	May 5	
Masks and Memories	Roy Mack (director); Lillian Roth, Queenie Smith, George Huston & Weldon Heyburn	May 12	
Murder in Your Eyes	Roy Mack (director); Ann English, Inez Courtney, Lilyan Gordon & others	© June 27	
Darling Enemy	Roy Mack (director); Gertrude Niesen, Weldon Heyburn, Earle Hampton, Ralph Sanford, Dudley Clements & Roscoe Ates	© June 28	
King for a Day	Roy Mack (director); Bill Robinson, Ernest Whitman, Dewey Brown, Hattie Noel, Muriel Rahn & Dusty Fletcher	June 30	Warner Bros. Big Band, Jazz & Swing Shorts (Warner Archive) DVD
Who Is That Girl?	Joseph Henabery (director); Bernice Claire, J. Harold Murray, the Morelli Singers, Pietro Gentili & Jack Good	© July 6	
The Song of the Flame	Joseph Henabery (director); Ruth Etting, the Canova Family, Eddie Bruce, Gerald Kent and Arthur Donaldson	July 7	
The Winnah!	Roy Mack (director) Arthur Lake, Florence Lake, Dorothy Dare	July 21	
The Policy Girl	Roy Mack (director); Mitzi Mayfair, Donald Novis & Roscoe Ates	August 11	
No Contest!	Joseph Henabery (director); Ruth Etting, George Lessey & Elmer Brown	August 22 (preview)	
Syncopated City	Roy Mack (director); Hal Le Roy, Dorothy Dare, Philip Loeb & the O'Connor Sisters	September 1	
Paree, Paree	Roy Mack (director); Bob Hope & Dorothy Stone	September 8	Silk Stockings (film) DVD
The Mysterious Kiss	Roy Mack (director); Jeanne Aubert, Alfred Hesse, Ray Middleton, Weldon Heyburn & the Sizzlers	September 26 (Film Daily review)	
The Flame Song	Joseph Henabery (director); Bernice Claire & J. Harold Murray	October 27	
Soft Drinks and Sweet Music	Roy Mack (director); Georgie Price, Sylvia Froos, Billie Leonard, George Watts & others	November 30 (Film Daily review)	
The Gem of the Ocean	Roy Mack (director); Jeanne Aubert, Ralph Riggs, Sheldon Leonard & Four Eton Boys	© December 4	Destination Tokyo DVD
Off the Beat	Joseph Henabery (director); Morton Downey, Donald MacBride, Niella Goodelle & the Tune Twisters	© December 15	
What This Country Needs	Roy Mack (director); Nick Lucas, Dorothy Nelson, Cherry & June Preisser, Janet Reade & David Burns	© December 24	

=== 1935 ===
Title	Director & performers	Release or copyright date	Notes
See See Senorita (Spain in the Neck)	Joseph Henabery (director); Tito Guízar, Armida, Roscoe Ails, Virginia Sale & the Cansinos	© February 9	
Mr. and Mrs. Melody	Roy Mack (director); Ilomay Bailey, Lee Sims, Jerry Lester, June Martel & Rita Johnson	© March 12	
In the Spotlight	Joseph Henabery (director); Hal Le Roy, Dorothy Lee, Herb Warren and Bob Simmons	March 30	
Hear Ye! Hear Ye!	Roy Mack (director) The Yacht Club Boys, Vera Van & Marie Nordstrom	© April 1	
Cherchez La Femme	Joseph Henabery (director); Jeanne Aubert, Stanley Smith & DeEspeys Troupe	© April 1	
Radio Silly	Roy Mack (director); Alan Cross, Henry Dunn, Lilyan Gordon, Billie Leonard & Dudley Clements	© April 8	
Shoestring Follies	Roy Mack (director); Val & Ernie Anderson, Eddie Peabody, Peggy Flynn & Sam Hearn	© April 8	
In This Corner	Roy Mack (director); Roscoe Ails, Budd Williamson, David Burns, Alice Dwan & Mark Plant	April 27	
Main Street Follies	Joseph Henabery (director); Hal Le Roy, Mary Joan Martin, Billy Vine & the Cavaliers	May 11	
The Love Department	Roy Mack (director); Bernice Claire, Billie Leonard & Donald Douglas	May 18	
Better than Gold	Joseph Henabery (director); Fifi D'Orsay, George Watts, Herb Warren & the Troubadors	June 8	
The Film Follies	Roy Mack (director)	June 29	
Singing Silhouette	Joseph Henabery (director); Olga Baclanova, Herb Warren, Charles Lawrence, the Mainstreamers, Lee Twins, Rio & Elliott	© July 6	
Cure It with Music	Joseph Henabery (director); Fifi D'Orsay, Eddie Ryan, the Chevaliers, Moore & Revel	© July 15	
The Castle of Dreams	Roy Mack (director); Morton Downey, Arlene Dinitz, Eddie Ryan & Toto	© July 15	
Fifty Dollar Bill	Roy Mack (director); George Watts, Eleanor Whitney & Jack Powell	© July 26	
Surprise!	Roy Mack (director); the Duncan Sisters, Jay Seiler & Wen Talbert Singers	July 27	Vitaphone Cavalcade of Musical Comedy Shorts (Warner Archive) DVD
Vitaphone Music Hall	Roy Mack (director); Seven Honey Boys, Four Mullen Sisters, the Radio Rubes, Ray Huling & his pet seal	August 7 (preview)	
The Lady in Black	Joseph Henabery (director); Countess Olga Albani, Mortimer Welson, Albert Dekker & Margaret Irving	August 17	
Dublin in Brass	Joseph Henabery (director); Morton Downey, Andea Marsh & Hugh Cameron	September 7	
Oh, Evaline!	Roy Mack (director); Hal Le Roy, Eleanor Whitney, Allen Goode & Ralph Blane	September 14	
The Doorman's Opera	Roy Mack (director); Charlotte Arren, Johnny Broderick, Thelma Leeds & Ray Heatherton	September 28	
Tickets, Please	Roy Mack (director); Georgie Price, Evelyn Dall, Thee Sizzlers, Byrnes & Farney	October 12	
Check Your Sombrero	Roy Mack (director), Armida, Tito Coral & others	November 2	
Rooftops of Manhattan	Joseph Henabery (director); Gil Lamb, Bob Burns, Deane Janis & Beverly Phalon	November 16	Vitaphone Cavalcade of Musical Comedy Shorts (Warner Archive) DVD
Katz Pajamas	Joseph Henabery (director); Fifi D'Orsay, the Meadowbrook Boys & Georgie Tapps	December 4	
Broadway Ballyhoo	Roy Mack (director); Owen, Hunt & Parco, the Eight Ambassadors, Art Frank	December 28	

=== 1936 ===
Title	Director & performers	Release, copyright or review date	Notes
Double or Nothing	Joseph Henabery (director); Phil Harris, Leah Ray, Vickie Joyce & Harry Tyler	January 18	Nominee for Academy Award for Best Live Action Short Film
Trouble in Toyland	Joseph Henabery; Gus Edwards & Troop	© January 27	
They're Off	Lloyd French (director); Yacht Club Boys, Richard Lane & Gerald Oliver Smith	© February 3	
Between the Lines	Roy Mack (director); Bernice Claire, Rodney McLennan, Arline & Ed Kinlay, George Dobbs & the Commanders	February 8	
Study and Understudy	Roy Mack (director); Ruth & Jane Frazee, Virginia Verrill, Danzi Goodelle & June Carr	© February 17	
Wash Your Step	Joseph Henabery (director); Hal Le Roy, Cherry & June Preisser, The Eton Boys, Nanette Flack & Harry Lang	March 7	
Paris in New York	Roy Mack (director); Irène Bordoni, Pansy Sanborn, Ames & Arms, Will Aubrey & Frank Mazzone	March 21	
The Black Network	Roy Mack (director); Nina Mae McKinney & Nicholas Brothers	April 1 (preview)	Warner Bros. Big Band, Jazz & Swing Shorts (Warner Archive) & Hallelujah! (film) DVD
College Dads	Roy Mack (director); Leon Janney, Edith Mann, Bobby Lane, Dudley Clements & the Columbia Glee Club.	April 11	
The Double Crossky	Joseph Henabery (director); Olga Baclanova, Wilbur Hall, Gretchen Kimmel & Ray Lee	April 18	
The Stars Can't Be Wrong	Roy Mack (director); O'Connell & Blair, Emerson's Mountaineers, Dorothy Lamour & others	© April 20	
I'm Much Obliged	Roy Mack (director); George Dobbs, Irene MacLaren, Vera Van; the Heat Waves & others	May 2	
Romance in the Air	Murray Roth (director); music: Howard Jackson; Wini Shaw & Phil Regan	May 16	
The City's Slicker	Rufe Davis, Radio Rubes, Dawn O’Day & Jay Seiler	May 20	
Maid for a Day	Joseph Henabery (director); Grace & Peter Hayes, the Ritz Quartette, Marvin Jensen, Don Lee & Louise	May 23	
When You're Single	Roy Mack (director); Alan Cross, Henry Dunn, Melissa Mason, Rosalind Marquis & Bonnie Clare	May 27 (Film Daily review)	
Rhythmitis	Roy Mack (director); Hal Le Roy, Toby Wing, Barry McKinley, Gail Reese, Frances Hunt, Rollo Pickets & Hugh Cameron	June 13	The Petrified Forest DVD
That's Pictures	Roy Mack (director); Jay C. Flippen, Elizabeth Houston, Dan Harden, Adrienne Andre, Mildred Law, the Clark Sisters & Nick Sett	August 14 (Film Daily review)	
The Backyard Broadcast	Joseph Henabery; Major Edward Bowes	August 14 (preview)	
Shake, Mr. Shakespeare	Roy Mack (director); Carolyn Hash, the Harris Twins	August 22	A Midsummer Night's Dream (1935 film) DVD
Rush Hour Rhapsody	Joseph Henabery (director); Johnny Hale, Jean Sargent, Billy Reed & others	September 16 (Film Daily review)	
Here Comes the Circus	Roy Mack (director); Carlo's Ponies, Randow Clowns, Poodles Hanneford & Co., Captain Proske's Lions & Tigers	October 3	
Say It with Candy	Virginia Verrill, Muriel Martin, John Fogarty, the Buccaneers & the Robins	October 3	
Sheik to Sheik	Roy Mack (director); George Metaxa & Ann Barrie	October 10	Shall We Dance (1937 film) (Greatest Classic Films Astaire & Rogers 1) DVD
Can't Think of It	Lloyd French (director); Ken Murray & Oswald, Elaine Arden, Ralph Sanford & Curtis Karpe	October 30 (Film Daily review)	
Sweethearts and Flowers	Roy Mack (director); Cherry & June Preisser, Regis Toomey & others	© December 9	

=== 1937 ===
Title	Director & performers	Release or copyright date	Notes
A Horse's Tale	Lloyd French (director); Joe & Asbestos, Harry Gribbon, Hamtree Harrington, Eddie White, Donald MacBride & June Nash	January 9	
The Pretty Pretender	Joseph Henabery (director); Bernice Claire, Adrina Otero, Nina Olivette, Stanley Smith & Byrne Sisters	January 23	
Captain Blue Blood	Roy Mack (director); Georgie Price, Nell O’Day, Ruth & Jane Frazee	February 13	
It's All Over Now	Roy Mack (director); Dan Healy, Brooks Benedict, Vera Niva & Evelyn Poe	© February 18	
Swing for Sale	Joseph Henabery (director); Hal Le Roy, June Allyson & Kay Hamilton	February 27	
Hotel a la Swing	Roy Mack (director); Eddie Foy, Jr. & The Mullen Sisters	March 13	Swing Time (1936 film) (Greatest Classic Films Astaire & Rogers 1) DVD
Play Street	Joseph Henabery (director); Cherry & June Preisser, Duke McHale, Walter Cassel, Verdi & See	April 3	
Cut Out for Love	Joseph Henabery (director); Dorothy Dare, Donald Novis, June Taylor, Jack Seymour & Don Gautier	April 3	
Mail and Female	Ken Murray & Oswald, Beverly Phaln, Elaine Arden & Florence Auer	© May 3	
Movie-Mania	Joseph Henabery (director); Dave Apollon, Yvonne Moray & the Savoy Dancers	May 8	
Sound Defects	Roy Mack (director); Rufe Davis, Irene Delroy, Rodney McLennan, Ruth & Jane Frazee	June 5	
The Rhythm Roundup	Joseph Henabery (director); Estelle Taylor	June 19	
Newsboys Nocturne	Roy Mack (director); Evelyn Poe, Tommy Rafferty, Billy & Beverly Bemis, Maurice & Cordoba	July 10	
Flowers from The Sky	Roy Mack (director); Josephine Houston, the Debonaires, Charles King, Harland Dixon & Morgan Conway	July 24	
Du Barry Did All Right	Joseph Henabery (director); Irène Bordoni, Eddie Noll, Marian Nolan & Charles Carrer	August 7	
Ups and Downs	Roy Mack (director); Hal Le Roy, Phil Silvers & June Allyson	October 18	“Broadway Headliners”; available on Stage Door (Greatest Classic Legends Katharine Hepburn) DVD
Starlets	Joseph Henabery;	October 23	“Presentation Revue”
Postal Union	Roy Mack (director); Georgie Price, Eddie Bruce & others	December 4	“Broadway Headliners”; available on Kid Galahad (1937 film) (Greatest Gangster Films Edward G. Robinson) DVD
Here's Your Hat	Roy Mack (director); Phil Silvers, Cookie Bowers & Ted Adair	December 11	“Presentation Revue”

=== 1938 ===
Title	Director & performers	Release or copyright date	Notes
Script Girl	Roy Mack (director); Alan Cross, Henry Dunn, Joan Abbott, Claire Carleton & the Gae Foster Girls	January 15	“Broadway Headliners”
The Candid Kid	Roy Mack (director); Phil Silvers, Josephine Houston & The Gae Foster Girls	February 12	“Presentation Revue”; available on Gold Diggers in Paris DVD
Little Me	Roy Mack (director); Wini Shaw & Janet Dempey	March 5	“Broadway Headliners”
Got a Match?	Joseph Henabery (director); George Dobbs, Joan Abbott & others	April 2	“Presentation Revue” (filmed August 1936)
Forget Me Knots	Roy Mack (director); Bernice Claire & Eugene Sigaloff	May 7	“Broadway Headliners”
The Prisoner of Swing	Roy Mack (director), Eddie Forman & Cyrus Wood (writers); Hal Le Roy & June Allyson, Al Fields & Eddie Foy, Jr.	June 11	“Broadway Headliners”; available on The Dawn Patrol (1938 film) (Greatest Classic Films War) DVD
Rainbow's End	Roy Mack (director); Gus Van, Eddie Leonard, Bert Swor, Lou Lubin	July 2	“Presentation Revue”
Up in Lights	Roy Mack (director); Ruth & Jane Frazee, Pat Rooney, Gae Foster Sisters, George Griffen & Rose Moran	August 13	“Presentation Revue”
Zero Girl	Lloyd French (director); Eric Wait, Bruce Mapres, Four Eton Boys, The Nu Yorkers, Evelyn Chandler, Francis Lemaire, Maude Rynolds & Bonnie Roberts	September 3	
Murder with Reservations	Roy Mack (director); George Campo, Nola Day, Florence & Alvarez and Garner, Wolfe & Hakins	September 24	
Toyland Casino	Joseph Henabery; Francine Lassman (aka Abbe Lane), the Michael Bell Ensemble, Albert Adams, Barbara Dennison, Kathleen Sullivan & Richard Monahan	October 8	The Amazing Dr. Clitterhouse (Greatest Gangster Films Humphrey Bogart) DVD
Two Shadows	Lloyd French (director); Ken & Roy Paige, Billy & Beverly Bemis, Irene Basley, Sharkey Bonano's Swing Band, Jean & Her Big Apple Dancers	October 22	
The Knight Is Young	Roy Mack (director); Hal Le Roy, June Allyson, Earlene Schools & Norman MacKay	October 29	Best Foot Forward (film) DVD
Cleaning Up	Roy Mack (director); Alan Cross, Henry Dunn, Ray & Grace MacDonald, George Campo	November 12	
Stardust	Roy Mack (director); Benny Davis, Bobby Joyce, Jackie Strong, the Dorn Brothers with Mary, Frankie Lanno & Jolly Gillette	December 10	
Boarder Trouble	Lloyd French (director); Harry Gribbon, Eddie Green & others	December 17	“Broadway Headliners”
Hats and Dogs	Lloyd French (director); Wini Shaw, Rags Ragland, Robert Shafer, Lois & Jean Sterner, Joey Faye	December 31	

=== 1939 ===
Title	Director & performers	Release or copyright date	Notes
Sophomore Swing	Roy Mack (director); the Merry Macs, Harvest Moon Dancers, Florence Wyman, Ballin & McEvoy, Ted Gary & Mitzi Dahl	January 28	
A Small Town Idol	Mack Sennett	February 11	Edited down (to two reels) feature film from 1921.
Sundae Serenade	Roy Mack (director); Rosie Moran, Melton Moore, Lola King, Al Verdi & Miriam Graham	February 25	
Projection Room	Roy Mack (director); Gower Champion & Jeanne Tyler, Jack Arthur, Evelyn Case & Eddie Foy, Jr.	March 4	
Home Cheap Home	Lloyd French (director); Henry Armetta, Ann Brody, Roy Roberts & Anita Simpson	March 18	
A Fat Chance	Lloyd French (director); Johnny Perkins, the Sisters Virginia, Gae Foster Girls, Arren & Broderick	March 25	
Public Jitterbug No. 1	Joseph Henabery (director); Hal Le Roy, Betty Hutton, Chaz Chase & Tom Emerson's Hillbilly Sextette	April 5	Carefree (film) DVD
Rollin' in Rhythm	Roy Mack (director); the Top Hatters, Ruth & Jane Frazee, Tito & His Swingtette, the Olympic Trio, the Six Marvels	April 15	
Seeing Spots	Lloyd French (director); Duke McHale; Jack Gray & His Debutantes, Jack Starnes & Ann Anavan, Herman Hyde & Sally Burrill, Irving Kaufman & Roy Roberts	April 29	
You're Next - To Closing	Roy Mack (director); Alan Cross, Henry Dunn, Leota Lane, Jones & Rooney, Gloria Day	May 13	
Wardrobe Girl	Roy Mack (director); Ginna Manners, Gae Foster Girls, Lester Allen & others	June 17	
The Broadway Buckaroo	Lloyd French (director); Red Skelton, the Condos Brothers, Maidie & Ray, Edna Stillwell, Hank Lawson & his Texans	June 21	
A Swing Opera	Roy Mack (director); Smalle Singers, John Elliott & others	July 22	
Seein' Red	Roy Mack (director); Red Skelton, A. Robins (The Banana Man), the Merry Macs, Harris & Shore, Louis Da Pron	August 26	
Remember When	Lloyd French (director); Willie Solar, Joe Sodja, Wiles Brothers, Four Eton Boys, Iris Adrian & Rags Ragland	August 1939	
Slapsie Maxie's	Gordon Hollingshead (producer); Noel M. Smith (writer); music: Howard Jackson; Slapsie Maxie Rosenbloom, Johnnie Davis & others	October 13	
Ice Frolics	Lloyd French (director); Eleanor Gardner, Mabel Taliaferro, Alfrted Trenkler & others	© October 28	
World's Fair Junior	Joseph Henabery (director); the Vitaphone Kiddies	December 9	

=== 1940 ===
Title	Director & performers	Release or copyright date	Notes
One for the Book	Roy Mack (director); Betty Hutton, the Beaus & the Belles, Miriam Graham, Gae Foster Sisters, Hal Sherman	January 6	filmed May '39
Alex in Wonderland	Gordon Hollingshead (producer); Charles Reisner & Owen Crump (writers); music: Howard Jackson; Eddie Foy, Jr., Walter Catlett & Jane Gilbert	March 9	
Double or Nothing	Roy Mack (director); Lee Dixon, Hollywood Doubles	April 20	filmed June '39
The Lady and the Lug	Gordon Hollingshead (producer); William C. McGann (director); story: Owen Crump; music: Howard Jackson; Elsa Maxwell, George Reeves, & Slapsie Maxie Rosenbloom	May 18	“Blue Ribbon Comedy”
Spills for Thrills	DeLeon Anthony (director); music: Howard Jackson; Harvey Parry, Allen Pomeroy & Mary Wiggins	June 15	documentary on stunt actors
Young America Flies	B. Reeves Eason (director); Jean Parker, Donald Woods, William Lundigan & Henry O’Neill	July 13	The Fighting 69th DVD
Riding Into Society Lug	Gordon Hollingshead (producer); William McCann (director); music: Howard Jackson; Elsa Maxwell, Lionel Pope & Mary Forbes	September 7	“Blue Ribbon Comedy”
Just a Cute Kid	Gordon Hollingshead (producer); Noel Smith (writer); music: Howard Jackson; Cliff Edwards, Dana Dale & Olin Howland	© October 5	Dance, Girl, Dance DVD
Alice in Movieland	Gordon Hollingshead (producer); Jean Negulesco (director); Owen Crump (writer); Joan Leslie, Nana Bryant, Clara Blandick & Clarence Muse;	November 16	The Sea Hawk (1940 film) (Greatest Classic Legends Errol Flynn) DVD
Sockeroo	Gordon Hollingshead (producer); William C. McGann (director); music: Howard Jackson; Slapsie Maxie Rosenbloom, Susan Peters, Frank Ferguson & Herbert Anderson	© December 24	
Love's Intrigue	Mack Sennett; music: William Lava	December 26	Vintage footage of Billy Bevan and other Sennett stars

=== 1941 ===
Title	Director & performers	Release or copyright date	Notes
The Dog In The Orchard	Gordon Hollingshead (producer); Jean Negulesco (director); story: Owen Crump (writer, adapted from Mary Roberts Rinehart story); music: Howard Jackson; Howard da Silva	January 18	
Take the Air	Gordon Hollingshead (producer); B. Reeves Eason (director); music: Howard Jackson; William T. Orr, Eddie Foy, Jr., Andrew Tombes, Frank Ferguson & Mary Brodel	February 22	
The Seeing Eye	Jerome Hillman (producer); music: Rex Dunn	April 5	Visits The Seeing Eye dog school in Morristown, NJ. Color remake made in 1951.
Throwing a Party	Gordon Hollingshead (producer); Ray Enright (director); story: Owen Crump; Elsa Maxwell, George Reeves & Marilyn Merrick	July 12	“Blue Ribbon Comedy”
Happy Faces	Mack Sennett (original director); music: William Lava	July 26	compilation of vintage First National Sennett films of the 1920s
Minstrel Days	Gordon Hollingshead (producer); Bobby Connolly (director); story: Owen Crump; Bud Jamison & archival footage of Al Jolson & others	September 6	
Perils of the Jungle	Gordon Hollingshead (producer); Attilio Gatti (cameraman/director); Herald Medford (writer); music: William Lava; narrator: Knox Manning	October 3	profiles the okapi in the Belgian Congo
At the Stroke of Twelve	Gordon Hollingshead (producer); Jean Negulesco (director);; music: Howard Jackson; Elizabeth Risdon & Craig Stevens	November 25	The Great Lie DVD; Adaptation of Damon Runyon's "The Old Doll House"
West of the Rockies	Gordon Hollingshead (producer); Bobby Connolly (director); music: William Lava; Richard Travis	November 25	
Monsters of the Deep	Bob Edge (director); music: Rex Dunn; narrator: Knox Manning	© December 27	Fishing off the Chile coast

=== 1942 ===
Title	Director & performers	Release date	Notes
Calling All Girls	Gordon Hollingshead (producer); Lloyd Bacon (director); Owen Crump (writer); music: Howard Jackson	January 24	The Big Street DVD. Some footage lifted Busby Berkeley musicals
Wedding Yells	narrator: Jack Carson	March 7	More vintage Mack Sennett footage.
Maybe Darwin Was Right	Gordon Hollingshead (producer); B. Reeves Eason (director); music: Howard Jackson; narrator: Knox Manning; Slapsie Maxie Rosenbloom	March 21	
California Junior Symphony Orchestra	Gordon Hollingshead (producer); Jean Negulesco (director); Jack Horner & Peter Meremblum	April 18	
Winning Your Wings	First Motion Picture Unit; John Huston & Owen Crump (directors); music: Howard Jackson; James Stewart	May 28	Larceny, Inc. (Greatest Gangster Films Edward G. Robinson) DVD
The Spirit of West Point	Gordon Hollingshead (producer); Jean Negulesco (director)	August 22	
The Spirit of Annapolis	Gordon Hollingshead (producer); Jean Negulesco (director); Naval Academy Band & Annapolis Glee Club	September 5	
A Nation Dances	narrator: Erskine Caldwell	September 26	filmed at a folk dance festival in Moscow, late '41
Beyond the Line of Duty	Gordon Hollingshead (producer); Lewis Seiler (director) & Edwin Gilbert (writer); music: Howard Jackson & William Lava; narrator: Ronald Reagan; Hewitt T. Wheless	November 7	Academy Award for Best Live Action Short Film; Portrait of an air gunner is available Yankee Doodle Dandy DVD
Vaudeville Days	Gordon Hollingshead (producer); LeRoy Prinz (director); Eddie Garr, the Whirling Camerons, the Duffins & Reo Brothers	December 19	Casablanca (DVD)
Little Isles of Freedom	producers/directors: Victor Stoloff & Edgar Loew; music: William Lava; narrator: Charles Boyer	December 26	Nominee for Academy Award for Best Live Action Short Film. Documentary about wartime Saint-Pierre-et-Miquelon

=== 1943 ===
Title	Director & performers	Release date	Notes
Our African Frontier	Carl Dudley; music: Rex Dunn	February 13	
Army Show	Gordon Hollingshead (producer); Jean Negulesco (director); Edward Dunstedter (writer)	February 27	
The Rear Gunner	Gordon Hollingshead (producer); Ray Enright (director); music: Howard Jackson; narrator: Knox Manning; Burgess Meredith, Dane Clark, Tom Neal, Ronald Reagan, Bernard Zanfield & Jonathan Hale	April 10	Nominee for Academy Award for Best Live Action Short Film; available on Objective Burma! DVD
Three Cheers for the Girls	Gordon Hollingshead (producer); Jean Negulesco (director)	May 8	Thank Your Lucky Stars (film) DVD; recycles Busby Berkeley numbers of the 1930s
The Man Killers	Howard Hill; music: Rex Dunn; narrator: Knox Manning	May 29	features Key West, Florida sharks and alligators
Happy Times and Jolly Moments	James Bloodworth (director); music: William Lava	July 10	short history of Mack Sennett

=== Warner Specials (1943-1951) ===
Title	Director & performers	Release date	Notes
Oklahoma Outlaws	Gordon Hollingshead (producer); B. Reeves Eason (director); Erville Alderson, Robert Shayne & Warner Anderson	September 4, 1943	“Santa Fe Trail” series; Montana (1950 film) DVD
The Voice that Thrilled the World	Gordon Hollingshead (producer); Jean Negulesco (director); music: Howard Jackson; narrator: Art Gilmore	October 16, 1943	Nominee for Academy Award for Best Live Action Short Film; available on The Jazz Singer DVD; short history of movie soundtracks
Wagon Wheels West	Gordon Hollingshead (producer); B. Reeves Eason (director); music: Howard Jackson; Robert Shayne, Nina Foch, Charles Middleton & Addison Richards	October 30, 1943	“Santa Fe Trail” series; Montana (1950 film) DVD
Over the Wall	Gordon Hollingshead (producer); Jean Negulesco (director);; music: Howard Jackson; Dane Clark & Tom Tully	December 25, 1943	Northern Pursuit DVD
Gun to Gun	Gordon Hollingshead (producer); D. Ross Lederman (director); music: Howard Jackson; Robert Shayne, Pedro de Cordova, Lupita Tovar & Harry Woods	January 8, 1944	“Santa Fe Trail” series; Montana (1950 film) DVD
Grandfather's Follies	Gordon Hollingshead (producer); Jean Negulesco & Jack Scholl (directors); Lynn Daggett, Jan Clayton, Angela Greene, Virginia Patton & Charles Foy	February 26, 1944	
Our Frontier in Italy	Gordon Hollingshead (producer); Saul Elkins (director); music: William Lava	April 29, 1944	clips of pre-war Italy
U.S. Marines on Review	Gordon Hollingshead (producer); Dave Gould (director); Dick Jurgens (band leader)	July 8, 1944	
Proudly We Serve	Gordon Hollingshead (producer); Crane Wilbur (director); music: William Lava; Tex Gordon & Andrea King	September 23, 1944	Hollywood Canteen (film) DVD
Once Over Lightly	James Bloodworth (director); music: William Lava	October 14, 1944	Clips of Charlie Murray and other Mack Sennett comics.
I Won't Play	Gordon Hollingshead (producer); Crane Wilbur (director); music: William Lava; Dane Clark & Janis Paige	November 11, 1944	Academy Award for Best Live Action Short Film; available on Passage to Marseilles (Classic Legends Humphrey Bogart) DVD
Nautical But Nice	Gordon Hollingshead (producer); Jack Scholl (director); music: Howard Jackson	December 2, 1944	recycled footage from “All Star Vaudeville”.
I Am an American	Gordon Hollingshead (producer); Crane Wilbur (director); music: William Lava; Dennis Morgan	December 23, 1944	Hollywood Canteen (film) DVD
Congo	Gordon Hollingshead (producer); Andre Corwin (director); music: Howard Jackson	February 25, 1945	wartime importance of Belgian Africa is examined.
Navy Nurse	Gordon Hollingshead (producer); D. Ross Lederman (director); music: William Lava; Marjorie Riordan, Warren Douglas, Andrea King & Robert Shayne	March 3, 1945	
Are Animals Actors?	Gordon Hollingshead (producer); James Bloodworth (director); music: Howard Jackson; narrator: Knox Manning	March 31, 1945	lifts footage from earlier shorts of the 1930s like “Here Comes the Circus”
Law of the Badlands	Gordon Hollingshead (producer); Jack Scholl (director); Robert Shayne, Warren Douglas & Angela Greene	April 14, 1945	“Santa Fe Trail” series
It Happened in Springfield	Gordon Hollingshead (producer); Crane Wilbur (director); music: William Lava; Andrea King, Warren Douglas & others	April 28, 1945	
Plantation Melodies	Gordon Hollingshead (producer); LeRoy Prinz (director); Craig Stevens as Stephen Foster	May 12, 1945	
Learn and Live	Gordon Hollingshead (producer); music: William Lava; narrator: Knox Manning	July 7, 1945	details US Army training films
Barber Shop Ballads	Gordon Hollingshead (producer); Jack Scholl (director); music: Howard Jackson; Cliff Edwards & others	September 8, 1945	
Star in the Night	Gordon Hollingshead (producer); Don Siegel (director); music: William Lava J. Carroll Naish, Donald Woods, Rosina Galli & others	October 13, 1945	Academy Award for Best Live Action Short Film; available on Christmas in Connecticut (Greatest Classic Films Holiday) DVD
All Star Musical Revue	Gordon Hollingshead (producer); Jack Scholl (director); music: William Lava	November 3, 1945	features footage not used in Hollywood Canteen (film)
Good Old Corn	Everett Dodd & Saul Elkins (directors); music: William Lava; narrator: Knox Manning	November 24, 1945	Vintage Mack Sennett comedies.
Hitler Lives?	Gordon Hollingshead (producer); Don Siegel & Saul Elkins (directors); music: William Lava; narrator: Knox Manning	December 23, 1945 (Academy preview)	Academy Award for Best Live Action Short Film
Musical Shipmates	producer: Roland Reed; William Clemens (director)	February 16, 1946	
Okay for Sound	Gordon Hollingshead (producer); narrator Truman Bradley; music: William Lava	September 7, 1946	The Jazz Singer DVD; documentary on the Vitaphone revolution
Pie in the Eye	Gordon Hollingshead (producer); Charles Tedford (director); music: Howard Jackson & William Lava; narrator: Art Gilmore	December 24, 1948	“Classics of the Screen” compilation; features vintage Mack Sennett material of the 1920s
The Grass Is Always Greener	Gordon Hollingshead (producer); Richard L. Bare (director); music: William Lava; Chill Wills, Vince Barnett, John Kellogg & Ned Glass	December 26, 1949	Adaptation of Robert Finch's 1939 one-act play Summer Comes To Diamond O; Nominee for Academy Award for Best Live Action Short Film; available on My Dream Is Yours DVD
Just for Fun	Gordon Hollingshead (producer); Charles Tedford (director); music: William Lava; narrator: Art Gilmore	July 15, 1950	“Classics of the Screen” compilation (edited in 1948); more Mack Sennett clips.
Ace of Clubs	George Marshall (director); music: William Lava	January 27, 1951	“Classics of the Screen” compilation; composed of Bobby Jones (golfer) reels from 1931 and '33.
The Knife Thrower	Maxwell Weinberg (director); David Kurlan	March 3, 1951	Warner Special (filmed 1949) adapted from a Guy de Maupassant story
A Laugh a Day	Charles Tedford (director); music: William Lava; narrator: Art Gilmore	November 24, 1951	“Classics of the Screen” compilation; more vintage Mack Sennett

== See also ==
- List of short subjects by Hollywood studio#Warner Brothers
- Robert Youngson, who supervised more “Classics of the Screen” two-reelers in the 1950s
- Technicolor Specials (Warner Bros. series)
