= The Naggers =

Series of short films

The Naggers was a series of 18 film short films produced by Warner Brothers at the Vitaphone studio in Brooklyn, New York. These featured Jack Norworth and Dorothy Adelphi as an arguing husband and wife in a variety of domestic settings. This basic premise predated the popular radio series The Bickersons and many future TV marital comedies.

== Overview ==
Often listed in the trade magazines as either part of the Vitaphone Varieties or "Pepper Pots", these black and white comedies averaged 7 to 10 minutes in length.

Jack Norworth was a songwriter and ex-husband of Nora Bayes, both subjects of a later Warner feature, Shine On, Harvest Moon (1944). He teamed with his then-wife Dorothy Adelphi in a pilot film, Odds and Ends, released in May 1929 as part of the Vitaphone Varieties. Norworth also had appeared in a few other films for Warner-Vitaphone, starting with 1928’s Songs and Things.

The Nagger comedies were played before the main features in 1930-1932, along with the latest Looney Tune or other accompanying Vitaphone short subject. A few have been shown on Turner Classic Movies.

== List of titles (with director and release or review dates) ==
- The Naggers / Roy Mack (director) / June 1, 1930 (Film Daily review)
- The Naggers at Breakfast / September 5, 1930
- The Naggers Go South / December 28, 1930 / two-reeler (18 minutes)
- The Naggers Go Rooting / January 4, 1931
- The Naggers' Day of Rest / Alfred J. Goulding (director) / © January 5, 1931
- The Naggers Go Camping / Alfred J. Goulding (director) / © February 20, 1931
- The Naggers at the Dentist / Arthur Hurley (director) / © March 16, 1931
- The Naggers Go Shopping / Al Ray (director) / May 1931
- The Naggers at the Ringside / Alfred J. Goulding (director) / May 11, 1931 (Film Daily review)
- The Naggers in the Subway / Alfred J. Goulding (director) / June 21, 1931 (Film Daily review)
- The Naggers' Housewarming / Alfred J. Goulding (director) / July 1931
- The Naggers at the Races / Alfred J. Goulding (director) / August 9, 1931 (Film Daily review)
- The Naggers' Anniversary / Alfred J. Goulding (director) / September 1931
- The Naggers at the Opera / Alfred J. Goulding (director) / February 7, 1932 (Film Daily review)
- The Naggers: Spreading Sunshine / Alfred J. Goulding (director) / April 3, 1932 (Film Daily review)
- The Naggers: Movie Dumb / Alfred J. Goulding (director); with Donna Broome, Frank McNellis, Granville Bates & Irene Alberg as supporting cast / May 1, 1932 (Film Daily review)
- The Naggers Go Ritzy / Roy Mack (director); with Robert Hyman & Donna Broome / May 22, 1932 (Film Daily review)
- The Naggers on Four Wheels- No Brakes / Alfred J. Goulding (director); with Barton MacLane, Ed Gragan & Flavia Arcaro as supporting cast / June 11, 1932

== See also ==
- Jack Norworth
- Vitaphone Varieties
- List of short subjects by Hollywood studio#Warner Brothers

== Links ==
- "Film Daily archives". The Online Books Page.
- Dorothy Adelphi titles on IMDb.com
- Naggers titles on Complete Index To World Film
