= Moonlight and Pretzels =

1933 film by Karl Freund

- Directed by: Karl Freund
- Written by: Monte Brice; Jay Gorney; Sig Herzig; Arthur L. Jarrett
- Produced by: Stanley Bergerman; Monte Brice; William Rowland
- Starring: Leo Carrillo; Mary Brian; Roger Pryor; Herbert Rawlinson
- Cinematography: William Miller
- Edited by: Robert Snody
- Music by: Songs: Jay Gorney (music); Sammy Fain (music); Yip Harburg (lyrics); Herman Hupfeld
- Production company: Universal Pictures
- Distributed by: Universal Pictures
- Release date: August 1, 1933
- Running time: 83 minutes
- Country: United States
- Language: English

Moonlight and Pretzels is a 1933 American Pre-Code musical film directed by Karl Freund, about a vaudeville singer-songwriter who puts on a Broadway show. The film was released by Universal Studios and featured Mary Brian and William Frawley. Lyricist E.Y. Harburg, best known for The Wizard of Oz, penned the words to most of the film’s musical numbers.

== Synopsis ==
In the small town of Walkerville, songwriter George Dwight is fired from his vaudeville gig. Music shop owner Sally Upton offers him a job as a song plugger. George continues to compose after hours and dedicates a new song, "There's a Little Bit of You in Every Love Song," to Sally. After Broadway producers the Hobart Brothers buy one of George's songs, he decides to move to New York, telling Sally to be sure to write to him.

In their New York City office, Irving and Jules Hobart are talking to Broadway star Elsie Warren when George barges in, claiming to have a song for any occasion. Hoping to get rid of him, they ask for something about crocodiles. George sits down at the piano and sings "Let's Make Love Like the Crocodiles." The Hobarts are impressed and sign him to a $25/week contract. George writes a string of hit songs for Hobart shows. They promise to sign Elsie for George's new show but they double-cross them both. George and Elsie walk out, planning to create their own show. They find backers who demand a 51% stake in the production.

George's new musical, "Moonlight and Pretzels", goes into rehearsal. Sally shows up backstage looking for George but is pushed into auditioning for the chorus. She gets the job and a dinner date with George. George's backers have an offer from the Hobarts to buy out their controlling share of the show; they give George until the next morning to come up with $30,000. George stays up all night, forgetting about his date with Sally. Elsie calls an admirer, Nick Pappacropolis, who wins money in a poker game and buys the share. Rehearsal continues with an elaborate production number, "Gotta Get Up and Go to Work."

Thinking that George has stood her up, Sally is packing to leave when George calls to apologize. She agrees to give him another chance. Nick throws a party at a German beer garden, where another big production number, "Moonlight and Pretzels," degenerates into a brawl. Nick's millionaire friend and fellow gambler, Sport Powell, has become infatuated with Sally and wins Nick's stake in the show. He intends to replace the star of the show, Elsie, with Sally, ignoring the fact that Sally has no stage training and can't sing. George and Elsie quit. Sally gambles for the show with Powell, who lets her win, and she hands the show back to George.

"Moonlight and Pretzels", with Elsie in the lead, opens and is a hit. George and Sally kiss.

== Musical numbers ==
"Baby – In Your Hat"
E. Y. Harburg, lyrics; Jay Gorney, music
Solo: Roger Pryor
One of the songs George plugs in Sally's music store.

"There's a Little Bit of You in Every Love Song"
E. Y. Harburg, lyrics; Sammy Fain, music (Sheet music)
Duet: Roger Pryor and Mary Brian
George writes this song with Sally's collaboration and dedicates it to her.

"Let's Make Love Like the Crocodiles"
E. Y. Harburg, lyrics; Jay Gorney, music
Solo: Roger Pryor
George's audition number for the Hobarts.

"I Took Your Picture Off the Dresser"
Al Siegel, lyrics and music
Solo: Lillian Miles
Elsie sings to potential backers for George's new show.

"Ah, But Is It Love?"
E. Y. Harburg, lyrics; Jay Gorney, music
George and Elsie have differing opinions about this song. George hears it as a ballad but Elsie wants "something hot." The production number contrasts two styles, opening with a slow tempo duet sung by John Hundley and Bernice Claire, with cameos from The Eton Boys and The Girlfriend Trio, accompanied by Jack Denny and the Waldorf-Astoria Orchestra. Then the tempo changes and a tap dancing chorus line turns the number into a swing dance.

"Gotta Get Up and Go to Work"
Herman Hupfeld, lyrics and music
Chorus, soloists Richard Keene and Doris Carson
"... dramatizing the new spirit of the people in regard to work." The choreography draws on the work of Busby Berkeley, incorporating overhead shots of kaleidoscopic movement and silhouettes of women getting dressed, effects Berkeley used in Gold Diggers of 1933.

"Are You Makin' Any Money"
Herman Hupfeld, lyrics and music
Solo: Lillian Miles

"Moonlight and Pretzels"
E. Y. Harburg, lyrics; Jay Gorney, music
Chorus, Frank and Milt Britton Band, vaudeville comedian Max Stamm, tenor James Carson
A drinking song celebrating the recent legalization of beer. (Note: The Volstead Act (officially the National Prohibition Act) was amended by the Cullen-Harrison Act in April 1933, declaring that beer was not intoxicating.)

"Dusty Shoes"
E. Y. Harburg, lyrics; Jay Gorney, music
Chorus, soloists Alexander Gray and Lillian Miles
With a nod to "Remember My Forgotten Man" from Gold Diggers of 1933, the finale of George's show is "...a dramatic cavalcade of American life from 1928 to 1933. The highlights depicted in song and action are the boom year of 1928, the stock market crash of 1929, and the depression years of 1930–32 inclusive, the election of Roosevelt and the inspiring leadership of the President since his inauguration with the wheel of industry set in motion by his rallying cry of a 'New Deal' to the nation."

== Cast ==
- Leo Carrillo as Nick Pappacropolis (credited as Leo Carillo)
- Mary Brian as Sally Upton
- Roger Pryor as George Dwight
- Herbert Rawlinson as Sport Powell
- Lillian Miles as Elsie Warren
- Bobby Watson as Bertie
- William Frawley as Mac
- Jack Denny as himself (credited as Jack Denny and His Orchestra)
- Frank Britton as himself (credited as Frank and Milt Britton and Band)
- Milt Britton as himself (credited as Frank and Milt Britton and Band)
- Alexander Gray as singer
- Bernice Claire as singer
- The Eton Boys as themselves (the musical vocal ensemble)
- John Hundley as Man in Bed
- Doris Carson as Woman in Bed
- Edward "Snowball" Harris, comedian and tap dancer
- Broadway's "fifty most perfect show girls" selected, according to Universal's publicity department, "by a jury of feminine beauty experts composed of James Montgomery Flagg, John La Gatta, Russell Patterson, Jefferson Machamer, Arthur William Brown and Hal Phyfe."

== Production ==
The film was not produced in Hollywood, but was filmed at the Astoria Studios in Astoria, Queens, New York City, primarily used by Paramount Pictures. The dances were choreographed by Bobby Connolly.

Universal planned a big publicity effort. "There will be nationwide Mary Brian and Lillian Miles style tie-ups with the greatest department stores; Shirt, hat and neckwear tie-ups on Pryor; pretzel and beer tie-ups; special music ballyhoos and a score of exploitation angles that will be a cinch to put over."

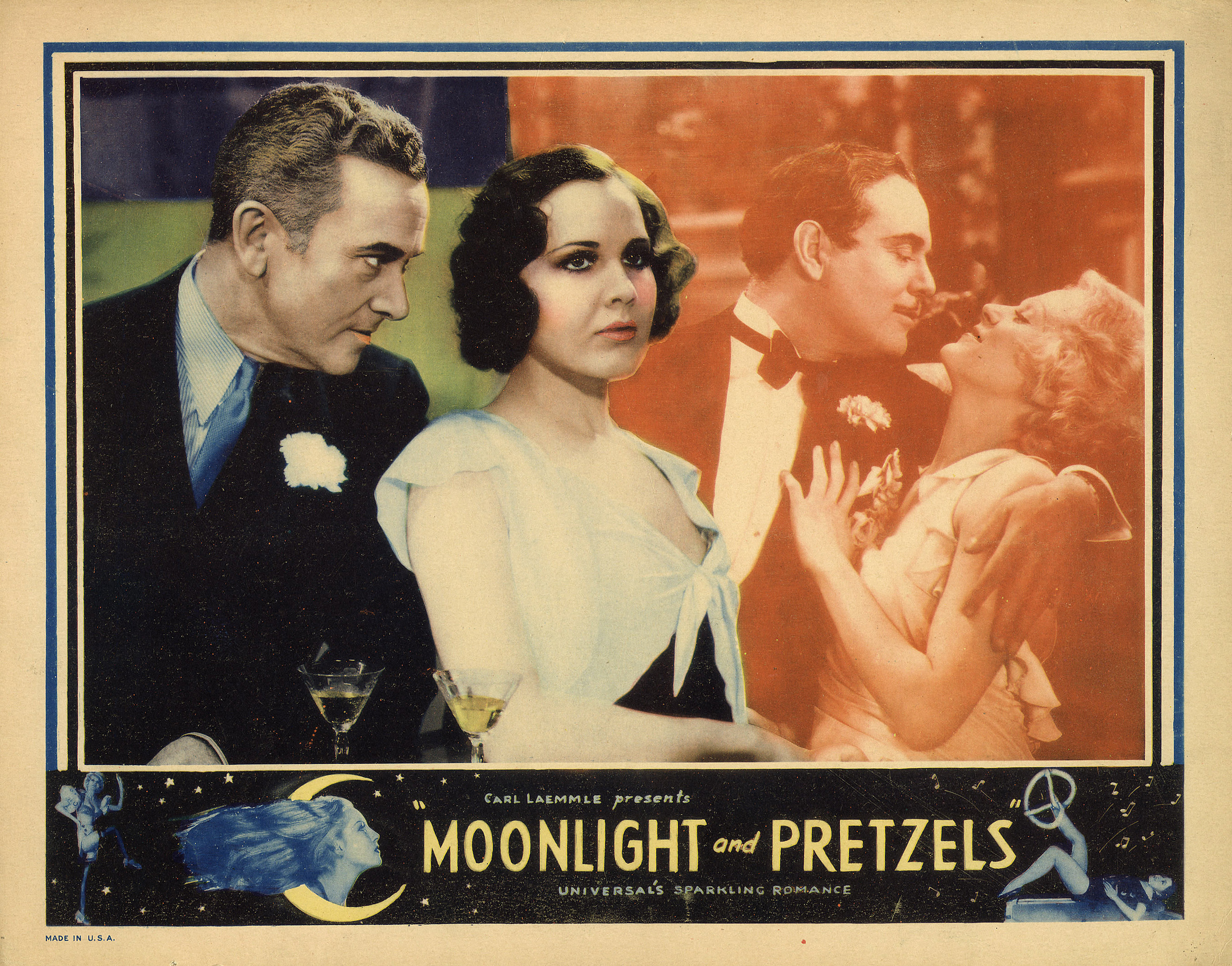
Lobby card for Moonlight and Pretzels

== Critical reception ==
The critic for Time wrote: "The extraordinary thing about this musi-comedy is not that it resembles Forty-Second Street and Gold Diggers of 1933 in plot, pattern and environment; that it has the same type of dances, staged by Bobby Connolly, and the same type of songs (“Dusty Shoes'” for a finale instead of ”Forgotten Men”); or that its ingenue, Mary Brian, not only looks like Ruby Keeler but has obviously been coached to speak in the same soft monotone. The surprising aspect of Moonlight and Pretzels is that it makes plausible Hollywood’s profound conviction that repetition is the secret of success. It copies Warner Brothers’ two hits even to the extent of being handsome and amusing."

Another contemporary review in Variety reported that the film "moves along at a sprightly pace and has sufficient pep to hold interest," noting the film's "several nice tunes," "some good dance routines," and "a good looking line of girls." The review also notes "[o]n the negative side of the ledger are a pretty dull and routine story, practically no laughs and no actual cast stars." A modern review of the film by Danny Reid notes that although it "was obviously made on a tight budget [...] and its numbers never escape feeling stage bound," it contains "a few undeniable charms that make it an enjoyable experience."
