= Angel in My Pocket =

1969 film by Alan Rafkin

- Promotional poster
- Directed by: Alan Rafkin
- Written by: James Fritzell; Everett Greenbaum
- Produced by: Edward Montagne
- Starring: Andy Griffith; Lee Meriwether; Jerry Van Dyke; Kay Medford; Henry Jones; Edgar Buchanan; Gary Collins
- Cinematography: William Margulies
- Edited by: Sam E. Waxman
- Music by: Jerry Keller; Lyn Murray; Dave Blume
- Production company: Universal Pictures
- Distributed by: Universal Pictures
- Release date: April 2, 1969
- Running time: 105 minutes
- Country: United States
- Language: English

Angel in My Pocket is a 1969 American comedy film directed by Alan Rafkin and starring Andy Griffith. One of three films originally planned by Universal Pictures to star Griffith, it also features Lee Meriwether, Jerry Van Dyke, Kay Medford, Henry Jones, Edgar Buchanan, and Gary Collins.

== Plot ==
The Reverend Samuel D. Whitehead, a former Marine, bricklayer, and recent seminary graduate, receives his first "calling," or assignment as Pastor of his own church. The Church of the Redeemer in Wood Falls, Kansas, proves a challenging assignment.

The trouble begins almost immediately after he drives into town with his family. A political rally connected with the upcoming mayoral campaign has erupted into a no-holds-barred, knock-down, drag-out brawl, which the sheriff will not stop. Sam attempts to intervene and succeeds only in getting struck in the face, so he drives on to see the church. There he learns that the church sorely needs major renovation, which has not been done in decades because the two founding families, the Sinclairs and the Greshams, have been running a feud for decades and cannot agree on the simplest decision that would benefit the church (or on anything else, either). Worse yet, Sam delivers his first sermon by preaching against physical violence—only to discover most of the brawlers in attendance, including one who blames him for making him vulnerable to someone else's assault.

Thereafter Sam spends most of his time trying to improvise to provide for the church needs, speak out on various problems in the community, and, ever more frequently, to run interference between the Sinclair and Gresham families. Each of these endeavors brings him trouble. First, his project to secure a new organ for the church leads to a confrontation with the church board when two town gossips witness him obtaining the organ from a house of Burlesque. Sam's brother-in-law, called "Emery," offers to help the caretaker repair the superannuated boiler—but unknown to Sam, the two men turn the boiler into a still and start producing raisin jack, a variety of moonshine. Next, he takes his children out of school after seeing the appalling conditions there—which prompts his Bishop to warn him not to interfere in town affairs. Finally, he performs a marriage between a Sinclair and a Gresham—and when the secret gets out at a church social (after "Emery" spikes the church punch with some of his raisin jack), Sam must physically restrain the heads of the families from brawling in the church fellowship hall, and then send everyone home. Not long afterward, the Bishop informs him that he is removed from his pastorate.

In one final attempt to save his situation and the community, he persuades his one remaining friend, Attorney Art Shields, to run for mayor as a write-in candidate, with the election two days away. That leads to a confrontation along the main street among three different political parades, including Art's. Then the church's still explodes, and the church burns down to its foundations as a result—and the attempt by the fire department to fight the fire turns pathetic when the fire hose springs multiple leaks. When the Sinclairs and the Greshams argue yet again about who was responsible for the faulty equipment, Sam roars at them to "go someplace else, yell your heads off, and let this poor church die in peace!"

The next day, the Whiteheads are moving out—when Art Shields joyously announces that he is trouncing the opposition in the election and will definitely be the next mayor. Art offers Sam a job with the town, but Sam declines, saying that he needs to find another church. But as he is about to leave town, Will Sinclair and Axel Gresham—reconciled at last, and at the head of a procession of building-material trucks—intercept him, tell him that they intend rebuilding the church, and beg him to stay on.

== Cast ==
- Andy Griffith as The Reverend Samuel D. Whitehead, Pastor of the Church of the Redeemer, Wood Falls, Kansas
- Lee Meriwether as Mary Elizabeth Whitehead, his wife.
- Jerry Van Dyke as Emery or "Bubba," his shiftless and alcoholic brother-in-law.
- Kay Medford as Racine, his mother-in-law.
- Henry Jones as Will Sinclair, Mayor of Wood Falls and head of one of the two founding (and feuding) families.
- Edgar Buchanan as Axel Gresham, head of the other founding family and Will Sinclair's principal opponent in the mayoral election.
- Gary Collins as Art Shields, Attorney at law and write-in candidate for mayor.
- Parker Fennelly as Calvin Grey, the caretaker
- Jack Dodson as Norman Gresham
- Elena Verdugo as Lila Sinclair, whose marriage to Norman brings the families to blows yet again.
- Herbie Faye as Mr. Welch
- Margaret Hamilton as Rhoda
- Ruth McDevitt as Nadine
- Bob Hastings as Ted Palish
- Jim Boles as Corby Gresham
- Leonard Stone as Paul Gresham
- Steve Franken as Zimmerman
- Larry D. Mann as Bishop Morensch
- Al Checco as Byron
- Maggie Peterson as Mrs. Toback
- Peggy Mondo as Charlotte
- Joy Harmon as Miss Holland
- Benny Rubin as Dad Schrader
- George Tapps as Ace Black
- Eddie Quillan as Reverend Beckwith
- Michael Barrier as Mr. Grant
- Claudia Bryar as Mrs. Axel Gresham
- Jesslyn Fax as Mrs. Styles
- Ellen Corby as Old Woman
- Rufe Davis as Old Man

== Themes ==
The film is a comedy that makes fun of small-town secrets, family feuds, politics, and gossip. The constant bickering between the Sinclairs and the Greshams (similar to the Hatfield–McCoy feud), and the spectacle of the mayor's office bouncing back and forth between the two families, suggest a satire on the Democratic and Republican parties.

The movie never identifies the denomination to which the "Church of the Redeemer" is supposed to belong. The presence of a bishop, the vestments that Sam Whitehead wears, Sam's prefacing of his sermon with collect and the fact that his title is "pastor" suggest that the denomination is Methodist, which has an episcopal system, or possibly one of the groups which formed the Evangelical Lutheran Church in America. Another possibility is the Episcopal Church, however the title given to the senior minister in an Episcopal parish is "rector," not "pastor."

== Background and production ==
This film was one of three originally planned by Universal Pictures to feature Andy Griffith in the wake of his television series' success. Griffith's disappointment in this film led to a cancellation of the project. Hence, the other two films were never made.

Griffith, Van Dyke and Fennelly would all go on to star in the TV series Headmaster in 1970. After that series failed halfway through its first and only season, Griffith teamed up with Meriwether to star in The New Andy Griffith Show, which ran for the rest of that season in Headmaster's time slot.

== Reception ==
Information on the film's box-office reception is sketchy; the Ultimate Movie Rankings website says the movie earned $5.1 million, ranking 52nd out of 172 films released in 1969. NBC-TV showed Angel in My Pocket as part of their Saturday Night at the Movies series on February 14, 1970; this was not long after the film was out of theatres, having been released just ten months earlier in April 1969. The network showed the film again on Monday Night at the Movies on November 30, 1970, but the movie has appeared on television only infrequently since then. It has never officially been available on home video.

The Rotten Tomatoes website has no aggregate critics' score for the film. However, in his Chicago Tribune review published in 1969, critic Clifford Terry characterized Griffith's lead character as a "minister with a Blue Ridge mountain accent and a positive-thinking-power approach -- a kind of Gomer Peale," referencing the Gomer Pyle character of Griffith's earlier eponymous TV series and positive-thinking clergyman Norman Vincent Peale. Terry gave the film a tepid review, calling Griffith as "blandly affable" and describing the film as "more hep than hip, filled with outdated, simple-minded smarm and reliance on gags like a shaggy dog pilfering a peanut-butter sandwich." Meanwhile, reviewer Roger Ebert of the Chicago Sun-Times gave the film 2-1/2 stars, calling it a "most enjoyable family film" and characterizing it as a "pleasant fantasy, well acted, telling a story interesting enough to do more than just amuse the kids. American democracy doesn't function as smoothly as you'd gather from 'An Angel in my Pocket,' and small towns will probably never again be as simple and sunny as this one in Kansas, but there's no harm showing the kids what could be or should be."

== See also ==
- List of American films of 1969
