= Mexico, Texas =

Unincorporated community in Texas, US

Mexico is a historical unincorporated community, in Hunt County, Texas, United States, near the shores of Lake Tawakoni.
