= Georgie Price =

American entertainer

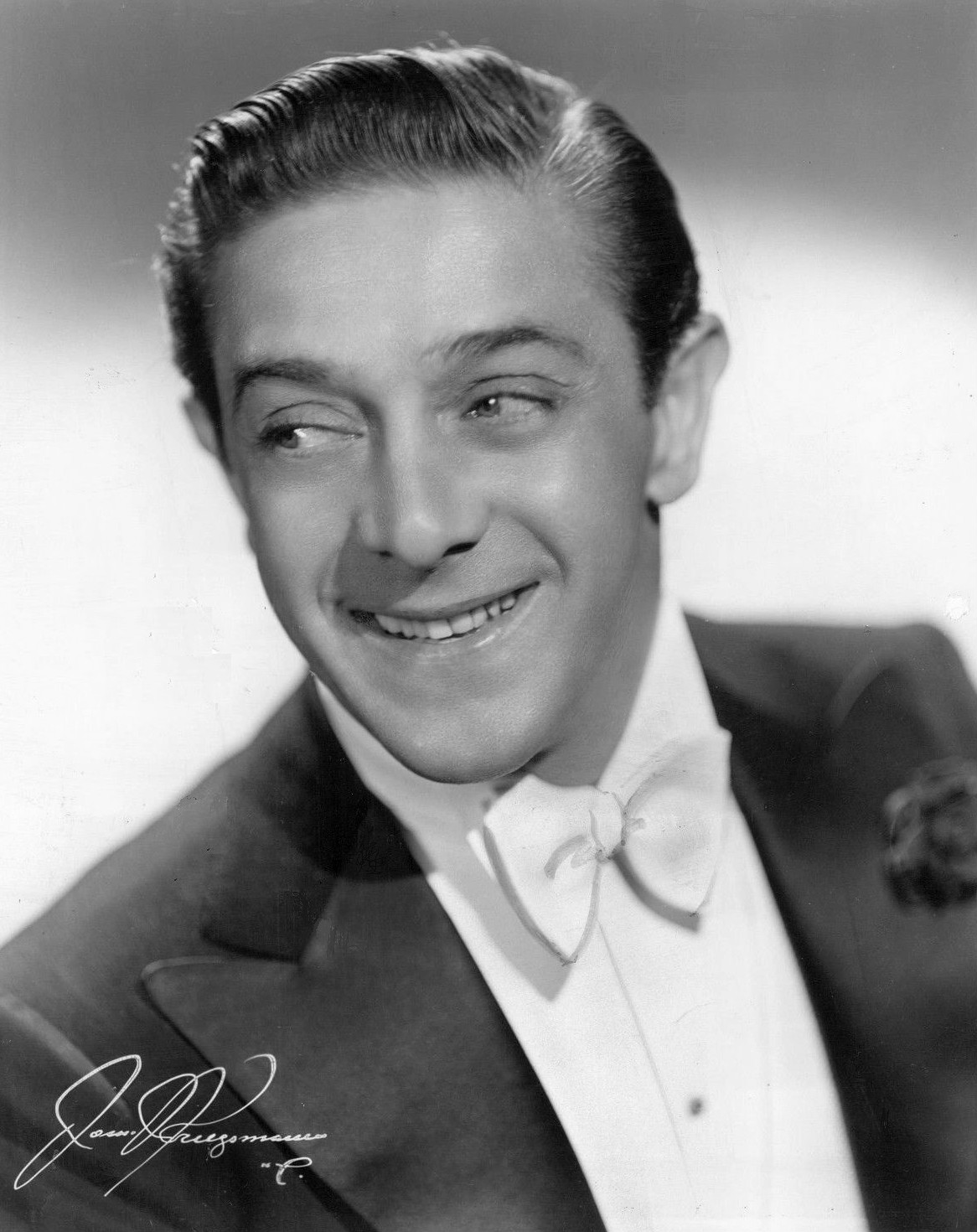
- Price in 1945
- Born: George Edwards Price; January 5, 1901; New York City, New York, US
- Died: May 10, 1964 (aged 63); New York City, New York, US
- Occupations: Stage/Film Singer/Comic; Financial Broker
- Years active: 1929–1954
- Spouse(s): Catherine Alexandra Marshall (1942–1963) (divorced) (2 children); Berenice Page (1921–1927) (divorced)

George Edwards Price (January 5, 1901 – May 10, 1964) was an American vaudeville singer and comic who performed in Vitaphone shorts in the 1920s and 1930s.

== Early life, family and education ==
Price was born on the Lower East Side of Manhattan, New York City, New York. Price began performing as a child in public places such as barrooms and streetcars, before winning amateur competitions. At six years old, he so impressed opera singer Enrico Caruso that he performed with Caruso in a benefit concert for a deceased police officer's family.

== Career ==
As a vaudeville child star, Price introduced the Edwards-Madden song "By the Light of the Silvery Moon" in Gus Edwards' revue School Boys and Girls in 1909. As a boy he performed on Broadway with another child Lila Lee (later a well-known film actress). He was a contemporary on vaudeville with George Jessel, Walter Winchell and Eddie Cantor.

As an adult professional, he drew comparisons to Al Jolson and Eddie Cantor. His theme song was "Bye Bye Blackbird".

A bitter dispute with Shubert theatre magnate, Jacob J. Shubert, caused Price by the late 1920s to give up show business to work as a Wall Street stockbroker. He bought a seat on the New York Stock Exchange. Shubert had originally hired Price with the promise to turn him into a major headliner but then reneged and in turn refused to fulfill the financial obligations on Price's contract.

== Personal life and death ==
Price was married three times. He was married to Berenice Page from 1921 to 1927; they divorced. Price's third marriage was to Catherine Alexandra Marshall from 1942 to 1963 when they divorced. They had two children. In all, Price had four offspring: sons Peter and George Marshall, and daughters Lisa and Mrs. John W. Larsen.

Price died in New York, aged 63.
