= The Eton Boys =

The Eton Boys, or The Four Eton Boys, were an American all-male musical quartet from the St. Louis, Missouri area, whose members were Art Gentry, lead; Earl Smith, tenor; Charles Day, baritone; and Jack Day, bass. "Incidentally, The Eton Boys never went to Eton College," write authors Scott MacGillivray and Ted Okuda; "the group's name is simply a musical reference ("Eton" is "note" spelled backwards)."

In the 1930s they headlined Broadway vaudeville shows, frequently appeared in short musical films such as Vitaphone's Broadway Brevities and Paramount's animated Screen Songs, and often appeared on the CBS radio network.

== History ==
They went to schools in the St. Louis area, and the two Day brothers entered show business first, as acrobats in a successful vaudeville act that played the Palace Theatre on Broadway nine times in one year. Art Gentry was once radio's youngest regular announcer and worked for KMOX, and he is the grandfather of television personality Matt Lauer. Earl Smith left vaudeville for nightclub work in New York, and joined the Eton Boys there.

== Motion pictures ==
The Eton Boys also appeared in motion pictures, exclusively in New York. Their busiest years in movies were 1933 and 1934: they were featured in two-reel, 20-minute Vitaphone musical shorts; Max Fleischer's Screen Songs for Paramount; and one feature film produced by Universal in New York, Moonlight and Pretzels.

The Screen Songs were animated cartoons, each showcasing a popular song. For example, Down by the Old Mill Stream (1933) had a hillbilly theme, with the animated characters harvesting apples for cider. Halfway through each cartoon, the Eton Boys would appear in live action and lead the audience in singing the title song, guided by the bouncing ball.

In 1941 the Eton Boys made their final film appearances, singing in 11 Soundies. These were short musical films produced in New York, especially for coin-operated "movie jukeboxes".

== Later lives ==
The Eton Boys recorded for Victor Records in 1941. They completed their radio commitments for NBC and disbanded in 1943. Earl Smith continued to pursue a show-business career, and Art Gentry sang in a radio series for World Transcription Service, "Songs of Our Times" (1948).

== Filmography ==
- Frances Shelley and the Four Eton Boys (Vitaphone short, 1929)
- The Operator's Opera (Vitaphone short, 1933)
- Use Your Imagination (Vitaphone short, 1933)
- Sing 'Em Back Alive (1933)
- Moonlight and Pretzels (Universal feature film, 1933)
- I Like Mountain Music (Screen Song, 1933)
- Down by the Old Mill Stream (Screen Song, 1933)
- She Reminds Me of You (Screen Song, 1933)
- Mirrors (Vitaphone short, 1934)
- The Gem of the Ocean (Vitaphone short, 1934) a musical short
- A Great Idea (Mentone short, 1935)
- Zero Girl (Vitaphone short, 1936)
- Rhythm Café (Nu-Atlas short, 1938)

Soundies (all 1941):

- My Gal Sal
- I Want a Girl
- They're Making Me All Over in the Army
- My Little Girl
- Old MacDonald Had a Farm
- The Sweetheart of Sigma Chi (vocal chorus only)
- Lily, Hot from Chile
- Beer Barrel Polka
- Jerk McGurk from Albuquerque
- A Bicycle Built for Two
- Sweet Adeline
