= List of vaudeville performers: A–K =

This is a partial list of vaudeville performers. Inclusion on this list indicates that the subject appeared at least once on the North American vaudeville stage during its heyday between 1881 and 1932. The source in the citation included with each entry confirms their appearance and cites information in the performance notes section.

Vaudeville was a style of variety entertainment predominant in the late 19th and early 20th centuries. Developing from many sources, including saloon shows, minstrel shows, freak shows, dime museums, British pantomimes, and other popular forms of entertainment, vaudeville became one of the most popular types of entertainment in America, Canada, Australia and New Zealand. Vaudeville took the form of a series of separate, unrelated acts each featuring a different types of performance, including classical and popular musical acts, dance performances, comedy, animal acts, magic and illusions, female and male impersonators, acrobatic and athletic feats, one-act plays or scenes from plays, lectures, minstrels, or even short films. A vaudeville performer is sometimes known as a "vaudevillian".

Name	Birth	Death	Nationality	Performance notes	Reference
Abbott and Costello			American	Comic duo consisting of William (Bud) Abbott (October 2, 1897 – April 24, 1974) and Lou Costello (March 6, 1906 – March 3, 1959). Abbott began working in vaudeville in 1918, producing a "tab show" on the Gus Sun circuit with his wife. Later, he began working as a comic "straight man." Abbott and Costello met around 1929 and possibly performed together in vaudeville in the very early 1930s. The duo went on to work in radio and film.	
Jean Acker	October 23, 1893	August 16, 1978	American	Actress known primarily for her work on film and as the first wife of Rudolf Valentino.	
Janet Adair	c. 1892	November 24, 1938	American	Singing comedienne with piano accompanist; she was the lead female performer in Bombo with Al Jolson.	
Jean Adair	June 13, 1873	May 11, 1953	Canadian	Actress of the legitimate stage who appeared in vaudeville in a sketch, Maggie Taylor, Waitress. Adair usually played mothers and elderly aunts onstage following her New York debut in 1922. One of her best known roles was as Aunt Martha in the play, Arsenic and Old Lace.	
Milton Ager	October 6, 1893	May 6, 1979	American	Pianist and songwriter. Ager worked in vaudeville prior to 1910 as an accompanist. He wrote for the stage and Hollywood and composed the song, "Happy Days Are Here Again" with lyrics by Jack Yellen.	
Will Ahern	October 9, 1896	May 16, 1983	American	Cowboy comedian and entertainer who performed in a comic duo with his wife, Gladys Reese. Ahern told jokes and performed rope tricks while his wife, using a Mexican accent, sang and danced.	
Harry Akst	August 15, 1894	March 31, 1963	American	Pianist and songwriter, Akst accompanied singers including Al Jolson, Nora Bayes and Frank Fay. Perhaps his most notable song is "Dinah", which has been covered by such artists as Bing Crosby, the Mills Brothers and Fats Waller.	
Jack Albertson	June 16, 1907	November 25, 1981	American	Actor, comedian, dancer and singer. After vaudeville, Albertson worked in burlesque, on Broadway and in Hollywood, winning a Tony Award, an Emmy Award and an Academy Award.	
Robert Alda	February 26, 1914	May 3, 1986	American	Actor, singer and dancer whose vaudeville career began in earnest after winning a talent contest. After working in vaudeville and burlesque, Alda appeared on Broadway, winning a Tony Award for the role of Sky Masterson in Guys and Dolls. He later appeared in film, as well. He is the father of TV and film actor Alan Alda.	
Joe Bennet Aldert	1889	1967	American	Dancer	
Russell Alexander	February 26, 1877	October 2, 1915	American	Euphonium virtuoso and musician who performed in a novelty musical act with his brothers, Newton and Woodruff. It was Newton who first formed the act, called "The Exposition Four", which consisted of Newton, Woodruff, James Brady and Willie Patten. Russell replaced Patten later. The group performed a comedy act with some blackface but also performed virtuosic feats on their instruments. Russell would become one of the greatest of circus music composers.	
Hadji Ali	1892	November 5, 1937	Egyptian	Regurgitator, billed as "The Egyptian Enigma", who performed an act where he swallowed kerosene followed by water. After regurgitating the kerosene and setting it ablaze, he would put out the flames with the regurgitated water. He also swallowed and regurgitated nuts and live goldfish.	
Maud Allan	August 27, 1873	October 7, 1956	Canadian	A dancer, Allan created the famous "Salome Dance", a dance of her own creation. After performing it first at London's Palace Theatre, in March 1908, she appeared at New York's Palace Theatre January 20, 1910. She toured in American vaudeville from 1916 to 1917 and 1919 to 1920.	
Fred Allen	May 31, 1894	March 17, 1956	American	Juggler and comedian who also performed in a comic duo with his wife, Portland Hoffa (January 25, 1905 – December 25, 1990). His original act featured Allen as a ventriloquist, the comedy coming from his lack of talent (at one point the dummy would fall apart). Later his act featured Allen as a clumsy juggler and once his wife joined, she would act as the "straight man" to his bad juggling routine. Later, the couple would gain prominence on the radio.	
Lester Allen	November 17, 1891	November 6, 1949	American	Comedian who appeared in a double act with Nellie Breen. He also emceed at the Palace.	
Louis Alter	June 18, 1902	November 5, 1980	American	Pianist and songwriter who accompanied Nora Bayes for a number of years and wrote songs for Irène Bordoni, Beatrice Lillie and Helen Morgan. Among his most popular songs are "Manhattan Serenade" and "Do You Know What It Means to Miss New Orleans."	
Nick Altrock	September 15, 1876	January 20, 1965	American	Former baseball player who appeared in a comedy routine with Al Schacht, The Clown Prince of Baseball.	
Kirk Alyn	May 31, 1908	December 6, 1993	American	Singer and dancer. Later notable as the first actor to play Superman on film.	
Don Ameche	May 31, 1906	March 14, 1999	American	Comedian with Texas Guinan's troupe. After vaudeville, Ameche worked in film, winning an Academy Award for Best Supporting Actor in 1985 for his work on the film, Cocoon.	
Morey Amsterdam	December 14, 1908	October 27, 1996	American	Amsterdam debuted in vaudeville as a cellist with his brother, a pianist. Within a short while, the act had become a comedy routine; Amsterdam's cello becoming a mere prop. After working in a nightclub owned by Al Capone, Amsterdam worked in radio, where he had his own variety show, The Morey Amsterdam Show, and in television where he was cast as one of Dick Van Dyke's co-workers on The Dick Van Dyke Show. He also wrote comedy dialogue for motion pictures.	
"Broncho Billy" Anderson	March 21, 1880	January 20, 1971	American	Actor who, following vaude, became the first star of the Western film genre. In addition, with George K. Spoor, he founded Essanay Studios ("S" for Spoor and "A" for Anderson) in Chicago.	
Eddie Anderson	September 18, 1905	February 28, 1977	American	Born into a vaudevillian family, Anderson began performing in a song and dance act with his brother, Cornelius and another young man, at the age of 14. The act was billed as the "Three Black Aces." Following vaude, Anderson appeared with fellow vaudevillian, Jack Benny, as "Rochester" on The Jack Benny Show on radio and later TV.	
Andrews Sisters			American	Trio of sisters, LaVerne (July 6, 1911 – May 8, 1967), Maxine (January 3, 1916 – October 21, 1995) and Patty (February 16, 1918 – January 30, 2013) who sang in close harmony. The trio started touring vaudeville in the early 1930s with the Larry Rich band.	
Margaret Anglin	April 3, 1876	January 7, 1958	Canadian	Actress from the legitimate stage who appeared in a sketch of the play The Wager, The Playhouse Theatre, New York, December 1917. Anglin was one of the most noted actresses on the American stage in her time, having gained the admiration of Sarah Bernhardt, the greatest actress of the age.	
A. E. Anson	September 14, 1879	June 25, 1936	British	Shakespearian actor who appeared in a vaudeville sketch entitled 1690 which he wrote himself.	
Capt. Adrian C. "Cap" Anson	April 17, 1852	April 14, 1922	American	Former baseball player who appeared in a sketch in 1913 with a monologue and short dance. He reappeared with his daughters in 1921.	
Dave Apollon	1898	May 30, 1972	Russian-American	Mandolinist. Apollon arrived in the US from Russia in 1921. Finding success in vaude, Apollon appeared as an emcee at the Palace and also appeared with his Filipino Orchestra on the last two-a-day program there, May 7, 1932. He also appeared in the final vaudeville presentation at the Loew's State Theatre, New York City, December 23, 1947.	
Macklyn Arbuckle	July 9, 1866	March 31, 1931	American	Character actor who toured vaudeville in the sketch, The Welcher in 1910. Arbuckle made his stage debut in Shreveport, Louisiana in 1888 and his New York debut in 1900. He found success playing "homespun" type characters and eventually he moved into film, creating the San Antonio Pictures Corporation.	
Roscoe "Fatty" Arbuckle	March 24, 1887	June 29, 1933	American	Arbuckle was a portly comic actor who was mentored by vaudeville veteran, Leon Errol. After leaving the stage, Arbuckle became a well-known comedian in silent films, eventually partnering with Buster Keaton. His career was destroyed by accusations that he murdered a young actress. Following two trials ending in hung juries and a final trial that acquitted him, Arbuckle's career was ruined. He would not return to motion pictures until 1932.	
Harold Arlen	February 15, 1905	April 23, 1986	American	Pianist, musician and composer. Among his more well-known songs are "Stormy Weather", "Get Happy" and songs for the movie-musical, The Wizard of Oz.	
Armida	May 29, 1911	October 23, 1989	American	Mexican-American singer and actress discovered while performing with her sister, Dolores, in Los Angeles. After becoming a part of Gus Edwards' vaudeville troupe, she made a number of films, including 1930's On the Border with John Barrymore and Rin-Tin-Tin.	
Charlotte Arren	July 9, 1911	September 30, 1986	American	American comedienne, actress, singer, and dancer. She grew up performing with her parents and brother Charles Arren in the family vaudeville act the Four Arrens. The popularity of Charlotte and her brother led their parents to rework the act into featuring just the children in a singing and dancing duo, the Arren Kids. As an adult she was one half of the comic and musical duo Arren and Broderick with her husband, the pianist and composer Johnny Broderick. She was famous for her parodies of operatic sopranos.	
Julia Arthur	May 3, 1868	March 28, 1950	Canadian	Actress from the legitimate stage who appeared at the Palace in May 1917 in a sketch called Liberty Aflame. As well as working onstage, Arthur made 10 silent films from 1908 to 1919.	
Adele and Fred Astaire			American	Ballroom dance duo with Fred Astaire (May 10, 1899 – June 22, 1987) and his sister, Adele (September 10, 1896 – January 25, 1981). The duo first appeared in vaudeville in 1912, but as Fred was underage, the duo did not return until 1916, when they toured many vaudeville circuits.	
Roscoe Ates	January 20, 1896	March 1, 1962	American	Comedian known for his portrayals of comic, stuttering characters. Ates later appeared in films.	
Cholly Atkins	September 13, 1913	April 19, 2003	American	Tap dancer in a noted dance act with Charles "Honi" Coles. Later Atkins became a choreographer for Motown.	
Lionel Atwill	March 1, 1885	April 22, 1946	British	An actor, Atwill toured with Lillie Langtry as her leading man in the play, Ashes during 1915. Following his stage career, Atwill worked in Hollywood, appearing in many horror films during the 1930s and 1940s. His career was cut short by a scandal involving an orgy at his home where a young woman was raped.	
Adrienne Augarde	May 12, 1882	March 17, 1913	British	Singer and stage actress,	
Gene Austin	June 24, 1900	January 24, 1972	American	Singer and songwriter who first appeared in vaudeville in the early 1920s. He performed as one of the first "crooners." Austin appeared on radio in 1923 and began recording as "The Voice of the Southland."	
Lovie Austin	September 19, 1887	July 10, 1972	American	Jazz pianist who toured extensively in vaude, often with her own band, the "Blues Serenaders."	

== B ==
Name	Birth	Death	Nationality	Performance notes	Reference
Frank Bacon	January 16, 1864	November 19, 1922	American	Actor and playwright, appeared in vaudeville skits and playlets. Father of Lloyd Bacon.	
Lloyd Bacon	December 4, 1889	November 15, 1955	American	Broadway actor who, following a season in vaudeville went to Hollywood where he became a director with Warner Bros. after appearing as an actor in nearly 40 films.	
Pearl Bailey	March 29, 1918	August 17, 1990	American	Singer and actress who followed vaudeville with a career onstage, on film and on TV. She garnered a Tony Award for her role on Broadway in Hello, Dolly!.	
Belle Baker	December 25, 1893	April 29, 1957	American	Baker first ventured onstage with the encouragement of actor, Jacob Adler and later, producer, Lew Leslie. Her debut in vaudeville was in Scranton, Pennsylvania at the age of 15 and she debuted in big-time vaudeville at Hammerstein's Theatre in New York in 1911. As a singer and actress, she established her name in vaudeville as "The Ragtime Singer." Baker is one of the Palace headliners who performed there numerous times. Her Palace debut was in 1913, when she sang the song, "Cohen Owes Me Ninety-Seven Dollars." Following vaudeville she appeared on Broadway and on the radio.	
Josephine Baker	June 3, 1906	April 12, 1975	American	Baker debuted as a chorus girl in vaudeville and in the revues Shufflin' Along, The Chocolate Dandies, and Runnin' Wild. Following that she left the US to become a dancer and singer in the cabarets and nightclubs of Paris.	
Phil Baker	324 August 1896	December 1, 1963	American	Pianist, accordionist and comedian who began in a double act with Ben Bernie on violin. Originally a serious musical act, over time it developed comic elements. Following their split, both comedians became successful in their own right. Baker headlined at the Palace in 1930 and 1931. He later enjoyed a career on Broadway in musicals and later radio.	
Balasis family acrobatic act				Acrobats performing in vaudeville, variety shows and circuses in Europe, US, and Canada from c.1900 - 1930	
Nikita Balieff	c. 1877	September 3, 1936	Armenian	Singer, dancer, actor, monologist and impresario of the Chauve-Souris comedy troupe.	
Ernest Ball	July 21, 1878	May 3, 1927	American	Accompanist, singer and songwriter known for writing sentimental ballads, usually with Irish themes such as "When Irish Eyes Are Smiling." Ball appeared at the Palace in 1923 and 1926 and died the next year in his dressing room at the Yost Theatre in Santa Ana, California while on tour with his singing group, "Ernie Ball and His Gang."	
Barbette	December 9, 1904	August 5, 1975	American	After seeing an aerialist in a circus, Vander Clyde or Van der Clyde (his real name) desired to become one. He responded to an ad in Billboard for the Alfaretta Sisters, an aerial act, who were looking for a replacement member. He began dressing as a female on their encouragement and continued to do so after leaving the act. In 1923, he traveled to Britain and then Paris, where he became the talk of the town. He toured Europe and returned to the US to continue in vaudeville. Following his stage career, Barbette continued to work with performers for various circuses.	
Ben Bard	January 26, 1893	May 17, 1974	American	Comedian, in a duo with Jack Pearl.	
Wilkie Bard	March 19, 1870	March 5, 1944	British	Comedian and singer.	
Reginald Barlow	June 17, 1866	July 6, 1943	American	Actor and minstrel. Appeared at the age of 9 with the minstrel troupe of Barlow, Wilson, Primrose and West. Later he became a film actor.	
The Barrison Sisters			Swedish	Five sisters who performed risqué songs and dances. The sisters were Lona, Sophia, Inger, Olga and Gertrude Barrison.	
Mr. and Mrs. Jimmy Barry			American	Married couple who performed as a comedy duo	
Ethel Barrymore	August 15, 1879	June 18, 1959	American	Actress who appeared in "tab" versions of her hits in the legitimate theatre as well as one-act plays. Barrymore's debut in vaudeville was in the one-act play, Civilization by Richard Harding Davis at the Palace Theatre the week of April 28, 1913. In 1914, Barrymore toured in Drifted Apart and later toured the Oprheum circuit in J. M. Barrie's The Twelve Pound Look with a salary of $3000 a week. The Twelve Pound Look played the Palace, June 1921 and in September and December 1926.	
John Barrymore	February 14, 1882	May 29, 1942	American	Actor, Appeared in a sketch called, His Wedding Morn', caused a sensation on Broadway in Justice and later for his portrayals of Hamlet and Richard III.	
Lionel Barrymore	April 28, 1878	November 15, 1954	American	Actor from the legitimate stage who appeared in a sketch of Bartley Campbell's play, The White Slave, with Doris Rankin. He also toured in The Still Voice in 1914.	
Maurice Barrymore	September 21, 1849	March 26, 1905	British	Actor on the "legitimate stage", Barrymore made his vaudeville debut in a one-act version of Augustus Thomas' play, A Man of the World, and headlined many other sketches.	
Charles Barton	1902	1981	American	Actor.	
Eileen Barton	November 24, 1929	June 27, 2006	American	Sang "Ain't Misbehavin'" in her parents vaudeville act at the age of 2 in Kansas City, Missouri. At the age of 3½, Barton appeared at the Palace as part of Ted Healy's routine. Barton later became a noted popular music singer.	
James Barton	November 1, 1890	February 19, 1962	American	Comic dancer who made his stage debut at the age of 2. Barton appeared in vaudeville at the age of 4, working steadily in stock and repertory theatre as well. His New York stage debut was in The Passing Show of 1919 and from there on he appeared in many musicals during the 1920s, appearing in vaudeville between roles.	
Billy Barty	October 25, 1924	December 23, 2000	American	Diminutive, juvenile actor, Barty originally appeared in film. He appeared in vaudeville with his sisters in an act called "Billy Barty and His Sisters", where he played the drums and did impressions. Later, Barty founded two service organizations for people with dwarfism.	
Count Basie	August 21, 1904	April 26, 1984	American	Pianist, bandleader and composer. Before the age of 20, Basie was touring on the Keith circuit and later, the Columbia Burlesque and T. O. B. A. circuits as a pianist, accompanist and musical director for singers, dancers and comedians.	
Blanche Bates	August 25, 1873	December 25, 1941	American	Actress of the legitimate stage who appeared at the Palace in December 1918 in The World Mother. Additionally, she would play vaudeville houses in between engagements. Bates debuted in 1897 with Augustin Daly's company later working with David Belasco.	
Clayton "Peg Leg" Bates	October 11, 1907	December 6, 1998	American	Rhythm tap dancer with only one leg.	
Warner Baxter	March 29, 1889	May 7, 1951	American	Actor. Later won the 1929 Academy Award for Best Actor for his role as the Cisco Kid in the film In Old Arizona.	
Nora Bayes	October 8, 1880	June 19, 1928	American	Singer and comedian who toured with her husband, Jack Norworth from 1908 to 13. She introduced such standards as 'Shine on Harvest Moon' and Cohan's 'Over There.'	
Beverly Bayne	November 11, 1894	August 18, 1982	American	Actress with her husband, Francis X. Bushman. Bayne and Bushman, following successful careers in silent films, appeared at the Palace in a comedy sketch, Poor Rich Man. The couple toured vaudeville throughout the 1920s. Unable to revive her film career in the late 1920s, following her divorce from Bushman, Bayne worked the rest of her life onstage.	
Ruth Virginia Bayton	November 11, 1894	August 18, 1982	American	Entertainer and actress.	
George Beauchamp	1899	1941	American	Violin and steel lap guitar player. Beauchamp developed the first commercially available electric guitar.	
George Beban	1873	October 5, 1928	American	Known for his Italian characters. Beban began playing French characters but once he began working in film, he played Italian characters. His initial act involved recitation of a poem called, "Mia Rosa." Beban created a one-act play from the poem, The Sign of the Rose, in which he toured vaudeville for seven years. A full-length version, also by Beban, premiered at the Garrick Theatre in New York in 1911. Beban signed with silent film director and producer, Thomas Ince, after his work in vaudeville and appeared in a number of films including a version of The Sign of the Rose called The Alien.	
Martin Beck	1867	November 16, 1940	Austrian-American	Actor and later one of the top vaudeville theatre owners.	
Digby Bell	November 8, 1849	June 20, 1917	American	Comic actor, Bell began his stagework as a singer, but eventually made his mark as a comedian. Bell was the leading comic in Lillian Russell's company and spent much of his later life in plays and vaudeville.	
Rita Bell	December 16, 1893	January 8, 1992	American	A lyric soprano, Bell's vaudeville career included the B. F. Keith Circuit.	
Robert Benchley	September 15, 1889	November 21, 1945	American	Actor and monologist.	
Chief Bender	May 3, 1883	May 22, 1954	American	Former baseball player who did an act with Kathryn Pearl called Learning the Game by George Totten Smith with music by Arthur Behim.	
Bennie Benjamin	November 4, 1907	May 2, 1989	American	Guitarist and banjo player with a number of bands, Benjamin would become a major songwriter following his work in vaude.	
Le Roy Benjamin	1917	1997	American	Built and performed with marionettes, later did voice impressions with Le Roy Brothers Marionettes.	
Belle Bennett	April 22, 1891	November 4, 1932	American	Trapeze artist and later silent film actress, Bennett, following a career in vaudeville, entered film in 1916 and worked through the end of the age of silent films.	
Richard Bennett	1870	1944	American	Actor who appeared in a sketch from the play The Common Man.	
Jack Benny	February 14, 1894	December 26, 1974	American	Comedian and actor, known for his comedic violin playing (a leftover from his stage routine) and for constantly presenting the idea that he is 39 years young. His radio and TV programs featured his wife Mary, comedian Don Wilson as announcer, and character actor Eddie Anderson as Benny's valet Rochester.	
Irving Benson	January 31, 1914	May 19, 2016	American	Comedian and actor known for playing Sidney Spritzer, the wise-cracking heckler of fellow vaudevillian Milton Berle, and for being a frequent guest on The Tonight Show Starring Johnny Carson.	
Alphonse Bergé	July 12, 1885	June 23, 1980	English-American	Noted for speedily dressing live models with bolts of fabric	
Edgar Bergen	February 16, 1903	September 30, 1978	American	Ventrilogquist with his dummy, Charlie McCarthy.	
Valerie Bergere	February 8, 1867	September 16, 1938	French-born American	Actress, headlined in vaudeville for 17 years	
Sammy Berk	c. 1894	1983	American	Novelty dancer.	
Milton Berle	July 12, 1908	March 27, 2002	American	Comedian and actor, later known as "Mr. Television" for pulling in record numbers in TV's early days for his "Texaco Star Theater".	
Irving Berlin	May 11, 1888	September 22, 1989	American	Musician and songwriter. Known for such songs as "Alexander's Ragtime Band", "White Christmas", "Easter Parade", "There's No Business Like Show Business", and "God Bless America."	
Sam Bernard	June 5, 1863	May 16, 1927	British	Actor, "Dutch" comedian and monologist known for his German characterizations. In 1885, Bernard toured the British music hall circuit later appearing at the Palace in January 1914 and March 1926.	
Sarah Bernhardt	October 23, 1844	March 26, 1923	French	Actress, known as "The Divine Sarah" and "The First Lady of the Theater"	
Ben Bernie	May 30, 1891	October 20, 1943	American	Violinist and comedian. Had an act with Phil Baker.	
Joe Besser	August 12, 1907	March 1, 1988	American	Besser first began in show business as a song plugger and magician's assistant. He worked his way up to being a comedian and headlined with acts such as Olsen and Johnson. After appearing on radio, Besser appeared on film and was a member of the Three Stooges for two years.	
Amelia Bingham	March 20, 1869	September 1, 1927	American	Actress of the "legit" stage, Bingham appeared in vaudeville at the Palace in July 1909 in Big Moments from Great Plays, which included excerpts from six plays. Bingham was discovered by a traveling actor while she was waiting tables in her father's hotel while on break from Ohio Wesleyan University. Following her Broadway debut in 1893, Bingham was noted for her sparkling performances in comedies and melodramas. In addition to her performances, Bingham also managed the Bijou Theatre in New York beginning in 1900 and organized her own stock company.	
Billie Bird	February 28, 1908	November 27, 2002	American	Actress and comedian who was discovered in an orphanage. Bird toured with the group for some time before creating an act with another girl called, "The King Sisters" which toured the Keith-Orpheum circuit. After vaudeville began to fade, Bird toured in musicals and comedies and on the nightclub circuit. She also worked in film and on television.	
Harry Blackstone Sr.	September 27, 1885	November 16, 1965	American	Magician.	
J. Stuart Blackton	January 5, 1875	August 13, 1941	British-American	Stage cartoonist billed as Komikal Kartoonist in an act with his friends Albert E. Smith the Komikal Konjuror and Ronald A. Reader who operated a magic lantern.	
Blake and Amber			American	Husband and wife comic duo composed of Winfield Blake and Maude Amber	
Block and Sully			American	Husband and wife comic duo composed of Jesse Block (December 16, 1900 – March 22, 1983) and Eve Sully (1902 – August 7, 1990).	
Joan Blondell	August 30, 1909	December 25, 1979	American	Actress. She joined her parents' act at 3, leaving the act in 1926 for Broadway and later Hollywood.	
Lew Bloom	August 8, 1859	December 12, 1929	American	Comic monologist and "society tramp."	
Ben Blue	September 12, 1901	March 7, 1975	Canadian	Comedian and dancer.	
Ray Bolger	January 10, 1904	January 15, 1987	American	Dancer and actor known for his "loose-limbed, comic" dancing style. Appeared on Broadway in On Your Toes and By Jupiter. Best known film role is the Scarecrow in The Wizard of Oz.	
Bessie Bonehill	February 17, 1855	August 21, 1902	British	Male impersonator, Bonehill first appeared on the American vaudeville in 1889. She worked heavily in the British music hall as well as playing the principal boy in British pantomimes.	
Irène Bordoni	January 16, 1895	March 19, 1953	French	Chanteuse and musical theatre star. Bordoni's first appeared in the chorus at the Théâtre des Variétés in Paris at the age of 13. She traveled to the US and began appearing on the vaudeville and the Broadway stages in 1912. The following year she toured the Orpheum circuit with Melville Ellis in tow as both accompanist and costume designer. From 1915 to 28, Bordoni appeared in a number of Broadway musicals but in vaudeville in her spare time. She appeared at the Palace in May and November 1927 and September 1930. After her retirement, she made occasional appearances on Broadway before dying while on tour in the musical, South Pacific.	
Luis Borromeo			Filipino	Also known as Borromeo Lou. A Filipino jazz pianist who performed at the Orpheum Circuit in the late 1910s. He returned to the Philippines in the 1920s where he popularized bodabil, a localized variant of vaudeville.	
Boswell Sisters			American	Trio of singing sisters composed of Meldania "Martha" Boswell (1905–1958), Constance Foore "Connee" Boswell (December 3, 1907 – October 11, 1976), and Helvetia George "Vet" Boswell (May 20, 1911 – 1988).	
Hobart Bosworth	August 11, 1867	December 30, 1943	American	Actor appearing in a sketch from the play Sea Wolf. Bosworth was already an accomplished stage actor having worked with the companies of McKee Rankin and Augustin Daly as well as with some of the leading ladies of the day. After contracting tuberculosis, Bosworth traveled west and became a leading man at the Belasco Theatre in Los Angeles, where he also founded the Hobart Bosworth Institute of Dramatic Arts. He entered silent films in 1909 and created Bosworth Incorporated in order to create feature films based on the works of Jack London. In 1917, Bosworth and Ethel Grey Terry, toured in a sketch of London's Sea Wolf.	
Ray Bourbon	1893	July 19, 1971	American	Female impersonator.	
Eddie Bracken	February 7, 1915	November 14, 2002	American	Actor and comedian, started in films as a child and later appeared as comic foil in numerous feature films.	
Hugh Bradley	May 23, 1885	January 26, 1949	American	Baseball player who appeared with the Boston Red Sox Quartette in 1912. The quartet included Buck O'Brien, Marty Hale and Bill Lyons.	
Nellie Breen	c. 1898	1986	American	She appeared in a double act with Lester Allen.	
El Brendel	March 25, 1890	April 9, 1964	American	Comedian.	
Jay Brennan	December 6, 1882	January 14, 1961	American	Comedian. Played the "straight man" to Bert Savoy.	
Walter Brennan	July 25, 1894	September 21, 1974	American	Actor.	
Herbert Brenon	January 13, 1880	June 22, 1958	American	Had a comic duo with his wife, Helen Oberg. Later he was a Hollywood screenwriter.	
Elizabeth Brice	c. 1885	1965	American	When she performed in vaudeville with Charles King they were known as Brice and King.	
Fanny Brice	October 29, 1891	May 29, 1951	American	Comedian and singer known for comedic songs, except for "My Man", and her portrayal of bratty Baby Snooks. The Ziegfeld Follies regular was famously portrayed by Barbra Streisand in Funny Girl and Funny Lady.	
Lottie Briscoe	April 19, 1883	March 21, 1950	American	Starred in a 1919 vaudeville skit by George Kelly entitled Mrs. Wellington's Surprise	
James Brockman	December 8, 1886	May 22, 1967	American	After beginning as a comedian in vaudeville, Brockman worked in musicals before settling in Hollywood as a songwriter.	
Helen Broderick	August 11, 1891	September 25, 1959	American	Singer-comedian who made her stage debut in the chorus of the Ziegfeld Follies of 1907. After becoming a comedian, she developed a caustic, wisecracking style and appeared in both musical comedies and vaudeville. Later Broderick worked in Hollywood.	
Harry Brooks	September 20, 1895	June 22, 1970	American	Pianist and songwriter.	
Shelton Brooks	May 4, 1886	September 6, 1975	American	Singer, pianist and songwriter. Many of Brooks' songs were composed for vaudeville singer, Sophie Tucker and among them, the song, "Some of These Days", which became one of Tucker's best known songs. Her 1911 recording of this song was selected in 2004 to be added to the National Recording Registry, ensuring its preservation in the Library of Congress.	
Heywood Broun	December 7, 1888	December 18, 1939	American	Drama critic who worked as a monologuist in vaudeville and appearing at the Palace. Broun began working for the New York Tribune in 1912 and went to serve as the drama critic for the New York World from 1921 to 1928 and also as the drama editor for Vanity Fair.	
Joe E. Brown	July 28, 1892	July 6, 1973	American	Comedian with the Bell Prevost Trio, Brown was often billed as "The Corkscrew Kid." Brown made his screen debut in 1928 and quickly became one of the leading comedians in Hollywood and later on television, thanks in part to his mouth and yells. Among his best known film roles is the millionaire, Osgood Fielding, in the 1959 film, Some Like It Hot.	
Nacio Herb Brown	February 22, 1896	September 28, 1964	American	Pianist and songwriter. Brown was accompanist to performer, Alice Doll, and toured with her on the Orpheum Circuit. Certainly one of his best known songs is "Singin' in the Rain", which he wrote with lyricist, Arthur Freed.	
Tom Brown	June 3, 1888	March 25, 1958	American	Trombonist and leader of Tom Brown's Band from Dixieland. Also put together the vaudeville band, the "Five Rubes" which disbanded shortly thereafter.	
Bothwell Browne	March 7, 1877	December 12, 1947	Danish	Female impersonator with a brief career; headlined at the Palace in 1919.	
Frank Browning	1882	1948	American	Former baseball player who was in a quartet with 3 other baseball players around 1925. The three other singers were George Crable, Tom Dillon and Kid Gleason.	
Peaches Browning	June 23, 1910	August 23, 1956	American	Actress, known best for her marriage at the age of 16 to Edward Browning, a 51-year-old real estate mogul. Shortly after their marriage, Peaches filed for divorce and her fame lead her to appear in vaudeville.	
Tod Browning	July 12, 1880	October 6, 1962	American	Actor. Later a Hollywood director who directed Dracula and Freaks.	
Harry Bulger	1872	April 14, 1926	American	Actor and comedian who was one half of the duo Matthews and Bulger. Starred in several Broadway musicals.	
Brox Sisters			American	Trio of singing sisters consisting of Dagmar Brock, born Josephine and later called Bobbe (1900 – May 2, 1999), Kathleen, later known as Patricia (June 14, 1903 – 1988), and Eunice, later called Lorayne (d. 1993).	
Buck and Bubbles			American	Dance duo with Ford Lee "Buck" Washington (October 16, 1903 – January 31, 1955) and John W. "Bubbles" Sublett (February 19, 1902 – May 18, 1986).	
John Bunny	September 21, 1863	April 26, 1915	American	Actor, comedians, and minstrel. Later a film star.	
Neil Burgess	1846	1910	American	Female impersonator, mostly playing elderly widows.	
Smiley Burnette	March 18, 1911	February 16, 1967	American	Singer. Later worked with Gene Autry and performed onscreen in Westerns.	
Burns and Allen			American	Comic duo consisting of George Burns (January 20, 1896 – March 9, 1996) and his wife, Gracie Allen (July 26, 1895 – August 27, 1964). Their radio and television shows proved their enduring popularity, thanks in part to Gracie's scatterbrained publicity stunts.	
Pesach Burstein	1896	1986	Polish-American	Actor, comedian and singer mostly in Yiddish vaudeville with his family. Burstein, his kids and his wife, Lillian Lux are profiled in the 2002 documentary, The Komediant.	
Mae Busch	June 18, 1891	April 19, 1946	Australian	Actress and comedian who found success in American vaudeville and later appeared in a number of Laurel and Hardy films.	
Francis X. Bushman	January 10, 1883	August 23, 1966	American	Actor who toured with his wife, actress Beverly Bayne. Following his initial silent film career in Hollywood, where he had become a matinee idol, Bushman and Bayne appeared at the Palace in the comedy sketch, Poor Rich Man in 1921 and toured various circuits throughout the 1920s. Bushman returned to Hollywood and continued work in film.	
Butterbeans and Susie			American	Comic duo composed of Jodie Edwards (1895–1967) and his wife, Susie Hawthorne (1896–1963). Their act was composed of duets and comedy routines about marital troubles. The duo was active on the T. O. B. A. circuit.	

== C ==
Name	Birth	Death	Nationality	Performance notes	Reference
James Cagney	July 17, 1899	March 30, 1986	American	Actor, before winning an Oscar, Cagney dressed in drag for a comedy act with four other actors. After several other bit parts on the stage, Cagney was spotted by Al Jolson while appearing in the musical Penny Arcade and was soon signed to a Warner Bros. contract.	
Marie Cahill	February 7, 1870	August 23, 1933	American	Singer and actress.	
Cab Calloway	December 25, 1907	November 18, 1994	American	Musician and bandleader. Calloway headlined at the Palace in June 1931 and at the Loew's State Theatre in 1932. Most famous song is "Minnie the Moocher".	
Emma Calvé	August 15, 1858	January 6, 1942	French	Operatic soprano.	
Mrs. Patrick Campbell	February 9, 1865	April 9, 1940	British	Actress from the legitimate stage who appeared in vaudeville in Expiation (a Russian tragedy).	
Judy Canova	November 20, 1913	August 5, 1983	American	Comedian and singer. Performed with her brother and sister in an act called the "Three Georgia Crackers" and later in an act called "Annie, Judy & Zeke."	
Eddie Cantor	January 31, 1892	October 10, 1964	American	Singer and comedian who often appeared in blackface. Appeared in various editions of the Ziegfeld Follies and Broadway musicals such as Kid Boots and Whoopee!.	
Cardini	1894	November 11, 1975	Welsh	Sleight-of-hand magician	
Mutt Carey	1891	September 3, 1948	American	Jazz trumpeter who toured the vaudeville circuits in 1917.	
Leo Carrillo	August 6, 1881	September 10, 1961	American	Character actor.	
Richard Carle	July 7, 1871	June 28, 1941	American	Comic actor who appeared in vaudeville in 1914 in A Slice of Life where he played Mr. Hyphen-Brown and in April 1915 in If We Said What We Thought. Carle debuted on the New York stage in 1891 and performed primarily in musicals until 1913 when he left the stage for vaudeville.	
Alan Carney	December 22, 1909	May 2, 1973	American	Comic dialectician. Later worked on Broadway and in films of the 1940s where he was partnered with comic Wally Brown.	
Georges Carpentier	January 12, 1894	October 28, 1975	French	Former boxer and song and dance man.	
Harry Carroll	November 28, 1892	December 26, 1962	American	Songwriter, pianist and singer.	
Suzette Carsell	1875	c1945	American	Known as The Mother of the Accordion. Toured from 1916 to 1921 with the Peerless Trio as Anna Vincent with Thomas Francis Savage (Tom Rosa) and Bertha Mae DeCroteau (Mazie Berto)	
Mrs. Leslie Carter	June 10, 1862	November 13, 1937	American	Actress of the legitimate stage who toured vaudeville in the role of Zaza, one of her most famous roles from the play by David Belasco.	
Emma Carus	March 18, 1879	November 18, 1927	German	Singing comedian who first appeared in vaudeville at Proctor's 23rd Street Theatre in New York in 1894. From 1915 onwards, she performed mostly in vaudeville.	
Diana Serra Cary	October 26, 1918	February 24, 2020	American	Juvenile actress billed as Baby Peggy. Following her film career, Baby Peggy worked in vaude, making $1500 a week, but with the death of vaudeville, Baby Peggy's career was over as well.	
Charlie Case	1858	1916	American	Blackface singer and pioneering monologist.	
Vernon and Irene Castle			American (Irene) and British (Vernon)	Ballroom dance team consisting of Vernon (May 2, 1887 – February 15, 1918) and his wife, Irene (April 17, 1893 – January 25, 1969). Introduced such dances as the foxtrot and tango to U.S. audiences.	
Walter Catlett	February 4, 1889	November 14, 1960	American	Comedian who worked in vaudeville and on the legitimate stage before working in film.	
Joseph Cawthorn	March 29, 1868	April 17, 1959	American	Minstrel and comedian, Joseph Cawthorn, made his stage debut at the age of 4 at Robinson's Music Hall in New York City. Later, he joined Haverly's Minstrels in 1872 and worked in vaudeville as a Dutch dialect comedian. He continued working in musical comedies and in 1926, made his screen debut.	
Lon Chaney	April 1, 1883	August 26, 1930	American	Actor, "the Man of a Thousand Faces" later scared moviegoers after years in vaudeville houses in films such as The Hunchback of Notre Dame and The Phantom of the Opera.	
Anna Chang	April 21, 1910		Chinese-American	Actor and Singer. Began singing on the stage at the age of six. Active from the 1920 - 1940's. She was billed as "The Chinese Songbird of San Francisco," "The Chinese Princess of Song" and "The Chinese Star of Syncopation. Featured in a singing duet with Hatsu Kuma in the film "Two Little Chinese Maids" (1929).	
Charlie Chaplin	April 16, 1889	December 25, 1977	British-American	Actor and comedian, toured the US with the Fred Karno troupe in 1910 and 1912–1913 before being signed by Mack Sennett the following year.|	
Chaz Chase	1902	August 4, 1983	American	Comedian whose act was to seemingly eat all manner of inedible objects, such as matches and paper (in reality he would turn upstage and spit them into his oversized top hat).	
Dave Chasen	July 18, 1898	June 16, 1973	Russian-American	Comedian who worked with Joe Cook.	
Doc Cheatham	June 13, 1905	June 2, 1997	American	Trumpeter, singer and bandleader who toured T. O. B. A. working in bands accompanying blues singers.	
Cherry Sisters			American	An act consisting of five sisters, Addie, Effie, Ella, Elizabeth and Jessie Cherry who sang, danced and acted. It was known as the worst act in vaudeville and audiences often attended to hurl produce and catcalls at them.	
Albert Chevalier	March 21, 1861	July 10, 1923	British	British music hall actor and comedian.	
Frank Christian	September 3, 1887	November 27, 1973	American	Trumpeter.	
Chung Hwa Four			Chinese	Singing quartet. Members included E. A. Donsang, L. Alaaron, James Oh Chung and H. K. Liang. Performed as the Chong Hwa Three after Alaaron left the group.	
Ching Ling Foo	1854	1922	Chinese	Magician.	
Chung Ling Soo	April 2, 1861	March 24, 1918	American	Magician.	
Paul Cinquevalli	June 30, 1859	July 14, 1918	German	Juggler.	
Ina Claire	October 15, 1893	February 21, 1985	American	Singer-comedian Ina Claire made her vaudeville debut in 1907 impersonating Harry Lauder. Her first appearance on the musical stage was in 1911 and she debuted at the Palace Theatre in 1915. She toured vaudeville on the Orpheum, Keith and Proctor circuits and appeared in the Ziegfeld Follies of 1915 and 1916. She continued on the stage in musical comedies.	
Bobby Clark	June 16, 1888	February 12, 1960	American	Comedian. Member, with Paul McCullough, of the comic team of Clark and McCullough.	
Bessie Clayton	1878	July 21, 1948	American	Dancer.	
Loretta Clemens Tupper	May 6, 1906	September 17, 1990	American	Singer and musician, performed with her brother Jack Clemens.	
Stanley Clements	July 16, 1926	October 16, 1981	American	Actor and comedian.	
Laddie Cliff	September 13, 1891	December 8, 1937	British	Eccentric dancer.	
Kathleen Clifford	February 16, 1887	December 28, 1962	American	Male impersonator billed as "The Smartest Chap in Town" who appeared in a top hat, tails and a monocle. Clifford's first appearance on the legitimate stage came in 1903 in the musical comedy, The Girl from Kay's. She worked in film from 1917 to 1928 returning to vaudeville in the 1930s.	
Herbert Clifton	October 19, 1885	September 26, 1947	British	Female impersonator and singer	
Maggie Cline	January 1, 1857	June 11, 1934	American	Irish American singer whose vigorous persona and hearty performances of Irish songs made her an immensely popular figure in the heyday of the vaudeville stage.	
E. E. Clive	August 28, 1879	June 6, 1940	British	Actor.	
June Clyde	December 2, 1909	October 1, 1987	American	Actress, singer and dancer billed as "Baby Tetrazini." Clyde began working in vaudeville at the age of seven progressing to stage musicals and eventually appearing in films in 1929.	
Ty Cobb	December 18, 1886	July 17, 1961	American	Former baseball player.	
Imogene Coca	November 18, 1908	June 2, 2001	American	Comedian who was born into a showbiz family. Coca's first stagework came at the age of 11 as a dancer and she worked in nightclubs and vaudeville houses before being discovered as a comedian. In the 1950s, Coca began work on television with comedian, Sid Caesar. Her work in TV spanned decades.	
Ann Codee	March 5, 1890	May 18, 1961	Belgian	Comedian who toured with her husband, Frank Orth. Their act toured the world and could be performed in 5 languages.	
Cole and Johnson			American	Singing and dancing duo consisting of Bob Cole (July 1, 1869 – August 2, 1911) and J. Rosamond Johnson (August 11, 1873 – November 11, 1954).	
Michael Coleman	1889	1945	Irish	Irish fiddler.	
Charles "Honi" Coles	April 2, 1911	November 12, 1992	American	Tap dancer.	
Lottie Collins	1866	May 1, 1910	British	Singer-comedian. Most well known for popularizing the song, Ta-Ra-Ra-Boom-De-Ay!	
Pinto Colvig	September 11, 1892	October 3, 1967	American	Comedian, the voice of Goofy in Disney cartoons and was the first Bozo the Clown.	
Chester Conklin	January 11, 1886	October 11, 1971	American	Comedian and actor. Later worked as one of Mack Sennett's Keystone Cops and appeared in some of Charlie Chaplin's films.	
Conlin and Glass	October 14, 1884	May 7, 1962	American	Comic duo consisting of Jimmy Conlin (October 14, 1884 – May 7, 1962) and his wife, Myrtle Glass.	
Jackie Coogan	October 26, 1914	March 1, 1984	American	Child actor, best known as Charlie Chaplin's sidekick in The Kid and (as an adult) as Uncle Fester on TV's The Addams Family. The infamous Coogan Law is named after him.	
Elisha Cook Jr.	December 26, 1902	May 18, 1995	American	Actor. Cook first appeared onstage at the age of 14 and worked onstage in stock theatre, vaudeville and Broadway. His first film appearance was in 1929.	
Joe Cook	1890	May 16, 1959	American	Born Joseph Lopez, Joe Cook first appeared in vaudeville in a juggling act with his brother, billed as "The Juggling Kids." He made one of his first solo appearances in July 1907 at Proctor's 125th Street Theatre, New York. He began incorporating comedy, props and monologues into his act and on January 2, 1922, he played the Palace. Following vaudeville, Cook appeared on Broadway and was heard on the radio.	
Baldwin Cooke	March 10, 1888	December 31, 1953	American	Actor who toured vaudeville with his wife, Alice and Stan Laurel.	
John W. Cooper	1873	1966	American	Ventriloquist with his dummy, Sam Jackson.	
James "Gentleman Jim" J. Corbett	September 1, 1866	February 18, 1933	American	Former boxer	
Maurice Costello	February 22, 1877	October 30, 1950	American	Actor and comedian.	
Willie Covan	1896	May 7, 1989	American	Tap dancer.	
Ida Cox	February 25, 1896	November 10, 1967	American	Blues singer who toured in vaudeville from 1923 to 1929. One of the bandmembers accompanying her was Earl Palmer.	
Joseph E. Coyne	March 27, 1867	February 17, 1941	American	Comedian/Dancer/Actor active on the music hall circuit from roughly 1884–1894 as half of the duo ' ' Evans and Coyne ' ' with actor Frank Evans. Transitioned to legitimate theater in 1895.	
Henry Creamer	June 21, 1879	October 14, 1930	American	Singer and songwriter.	
Will Cressy	October 20, 1863	May 7, 1930	American	Actor and writer.	
Crumit and Sanderson			American	Husband and wife singing duo with Frank Crumit (September 26, 1888 – September 7, 1943) and Julia Sanderson (August 20, 1887 – January 27, 1975).	
Pauline Curley	December 19, 1903	December 16, 2000	American	From the age of 7, Curley appeared onstage, including in vaudeville, where she was a singer and dancer. From 1915 to 1928, Curley appeared in silent films.	

== D ==
Name	Birth	Death	Nationality	Performance notes	Reference
Dan Dailey	December 4, 1913	October 16, 1978	American	Dancer, singer and actor.	
Peter F. Dailey	1868	1908	American	Comedian, one of the members of the popular act, "The American Four." His debut on the legitimate stage was with the Howard Atheneum Company. Later, he appeared with Weber and Fields.	
Dainty Marie	November 6, 1886	April 2, 1960	American	Marie Meeker, aerial performer in both vaudeville and circus.	
Dorothy Dalton	September 22, 1893	April 13, 1972	American	Actress.	
Viola Dana	June 28, 1897	July 3, 1987	American	Actress. Before she worked in silent films, Dana worked extensively on the legitimate stage. Her first foray into vaudeville was in a playlet called There Goes the Bride which received bad reviews. She tried her hand at vaudeville again with a sketch by Anita Loos called, The Inkwell, supported by Edward Arnold which did much better.	
The Dancing Cansinos	NA	NA	Spanish	A family Spanish dancing act, The Dancing Cansinos included Eduardo Cansino, Sr. (March 2, 1895 – December 24, 1968), his wife, Volga Hayworth (1900 – February 5, 1945), daughter Rita Hayworth (October 17, 1918 – May 14, 1987), and son, Eduardo, Jr. (October 13, 1919 – March 11, 1974).	
The Davene Gymnasts	NA	NA	English (But posing as French)	Troupe of acrobats, gymnast, and aerialists founded in England. Pretended to be a family group from France while most of its members were not related and none of them French.	
Cow Cow Davenport	April 23, 1894	December 12, 1955	American	A Boogie-woogie and Piano Blues player as well as Vaudeville entertainer. Davenport's first fame came as accompanist to blues musicians Dora Carr and Ivy Smith. Davenport and Carr had a Vaudeville act as Davenport & Co.	
Maude Davey	1963	Living	Australian	Actress. She has also performed in cabaret and neo-burlesque shows.	
Marion Davies	January 3, 1897	September 23, 1961	American	Actress and comedian. Davies appeared as a 'comic' chorine in vaudeville as well as the Ziegfeld Follies of 1916.	
Reine Davies	June 6, 1886	April 5, 1938	American	Singer and actress.	
Benny Davis	August 21, 1895	December 20, 1979	American	Pianist, singer and songwriter.	
Joan Davis	June 29, 1907	May 22, 1961	American	Actress and comedian.	
Sammy Davis Jr.	December 8, 1925	May 16, 1990	American	Dancer and singer, performed with his father and uncle as "The Will Maston Trio". As an adult, he became one of the most celebrated entertainers of his time and a member of the infamous Rat Pack with Frank Sinatra and Dean Martin.	
Sammy Davis Sr.	December 12, 1900	May 21, 1988	American	Dancer. Father of Sammy Davis, Jr.	
Hazel Dawn	March 23, 1890	August 28, 1988	American	Musical comedy actress. Dawn debuted in vaudeville at New York's Alhambra Theatre in 1923 in a sketch called, The Pink Lady. She appeared at the Palace in January 1924 in a playlet called, The Land of Love by Edgar Allen Woolf. Additionally, Dawn appeared in 11 feature films for the Famous Players Film Company between 1914 and 1917.	
Mlle. Dazie	September 16, 1884	August 12, 1952	American	Toe-dancer. Dazie's first appearance in vaudeville was as "Le Domino Rouge" in an act where she wore a red mask. After she got rid of the mask, she was billed as "Mlle. Dazie" and it was under this name that she appeared in the Ziegfeld Follies. She toured the Keith circuit in a ballet panotmime, L'Amour d'Artiste and headlined the Palace in 1917 in another ballet pantomime directed by Herbert Brenon.	
Vaughn De Leath	September 26, 1896	May 28, 1943	American	Actress and singer.	
Gracie Deagon	1893 or 1894	After 1966	American	Actress, comedian, singer, writer	
Dizzy Dean	January 16, 1910	July 17, 1974	American	Former baseball player.	
Bertha Mae DeCroteau	May 30, 1889	July, 1968	American	Toured from 1910 to 1912 as Savage & De Croteau with husband Thomas Francis Savage and 1916–1921 with the Peerless Trio with Thomas Francis Savage and Suzette Carsell, The Mother of the Accordion	
Carter DeHaven	October 5, 1886	July 20, 1977	American	Comedian.	
Guido Deiro	September 1, 1886	July 26, 1950	Italian-American	piano-accordionist	
Dorothy Dell	January 30, 1915	June 28, 1934	American	Singer and dancer in a duo with Allan Mann.	
William Demarest	February 27, 1892	December 28, 1983	American	Comedian and later character actor, popular in Hollywood in the 1940s and 1950s, best known as "Uncle Charlie" on the TV sitcom My Three Sons.	
Bernardo De Pace	March 31, 1881	1966	Italian	Actor, musician and comedic vaudeville entertainer of the 1920s, billed as "the Wizard of the Mandolin".	
Gaby Deslys	September 4, 1881	February 11, 1920	French	Singer and dancer.	
Elliott Dexter	March 29, 1870	November 21, 1949	American	Actor. Later worked in silent films.	
William Dillon	November 6, 1877	February 10, 1966	American	Singer and songwriter.	
Henry E. Dixey	January 6, 1859	February 25, 1943	American	Actor, dancer and comedian.	
Lew Dockstader	1856	October 26, 1924	American	Comedian and minstrel.	
Dolly Sisters			Hungarian-American	Twin sisters, Rosie and Jenny (October 25, 1892 – May 1, 1941 Jenny and 1 January 1970 Rosie) who had a dance act.	
Hessie Donahue	1874	1961	American	Female stunt boxer and first person to knock out John L. Sullivan.	
Jack Donahue	December 29, 1888	October 1, 1930	American	Dancer, singer and actor. Worked with his wife, Alice Stewart, as Donahue & Stewart.	
Kitty Doner	September 6, 1895	August 26, 1988	American	Male impersonator and dancer. Of the male impersonators in vaude, Doner was the best known American-born male "imp". She was the first male impersonator to play the Palace, in 1919 and she played there again in May 1926.	
Mike Donlin	May 30, 1878	September 24, 1943	American	Former major league baseball player who entered vaudeville after marrying an actress, Mabel Hite. Acted in a one-act play, Stealing Home and later worked as a comedian with Tom Lewis.	
Red Dooin	July 12, 1879	May 12, 1952	American	Baseball player who appeared in vaudeville first with a singing act and a singing and talking act with Dumon's Minstrels in Philadelphia, 1910.	
Fifi D'Orsay	April 16, 1907	December 2, 1982	Canadian	Singer and Comedian.	
Billie Dove	May 4, 1901	December 31, 1998	American	Ziegfeld girl in the Follies of 1917 and 1918. Later, Dove appeared in films and was a mistress of Howard Hughes.	
Eddie Dowling	December 9, 1894	February 18, 1976	American	Actor and singer.	
Johnny Downs	October 10, 1913	June 6, 1994	American	Child actor who appeared in the Our Gang series of shorts along with several feature films. Following his film work, he appeared in vaudeville in the early 1930s.	
Thomas Nelson Downs	March 16, 1867	September 1938	American	Magician specializing in coin tricks.	
Louise Dresser	October 5, 1878	April 24, 1965	American	Singer and actress.	
Marie Dressler	November 9, 1869	July 28, 1934	Canadian	Actress and comedian, who later found greater fame in movies such as Min and Bill and Dinner at Eight.	
Dorothy Drew			American	Comedic actress.	
Mr. and Mrs. Sidney Drew			American	Husband and wife comic team with Sidney (August 28, 1868 – April 9, 1919) and Gladys Rankin Drew (c. 1874 – January 9, 1914).	
Dave Dreyer	September 22, 1894	1967	American	Pianist and songwriter.	
Duffy and Sweeney			American	Knockabout comedy act consisting of James Terence Duffy (1889 – March 30, 1939) and Frederick Chase Sweeney (1894 – December 10, 1954).	
Margaret Dumont	October 20, 1882	March 6, 1965	American	Actress and singer, best known as the comic foil for the Marx Brothers, performed under the name "Daisy Dumont" before entering motion pictures.	
Duncan Sisters			American	Singing sister act composed of Vivian (June 17, 1899 – September 19, 1986) and Rosetta Duncan (November 23, 1896 – December 4, 1959).	
James Dunn	November 2, 1905	September 3, 1967	American	Actor.	
Jack Durant	April 12, 1905	January 7, 1984	American	Acrobat and comedian.	
Jimmy Durante	February 10, 1893	January 29, 1980	American	Comedian and actor, known for his huge nose.	
Walter Dyett	January 11, 1901	November 17, 1969	American	Violinist and conductor of vaudeville pit orchestras. Following his work in vaudeville, Dyett became a noted music educator working at Chicago's DuSable High School. As a music teacher and director of school ensembles, Dyett influenced many up-and-coming jazz, blues and rock musicians.	
Jacqueline Dyris			Belgian	Dancer.	

== E ==
Name	Birth	Death	Nationality	Performance notes	Reference
Charles Eaton	June 22, 1910	August 15, 2004	American	Actor.	
Mary Eaton	January 29, 1901	October 10, 1948	American	Singer, dancer, actress and Ziegfeld girl.	
Pearl Eaton	August 1, 1898	September 10, 1958	American	Singer, dancer, actress and Ziegfeld girl.	
Buddy and Vilma Ebsen	April 2, 1908	July 6, 2003	American	Brother and sister dance duo. Buddy later became known to millions of TV viewers in the 1960s and 1970s playing Jed Clampett in The Beverly Hillbillies and playing the title role in Barnaby Jones.	
Gertrude Ederle	October 23, 1905	November 30, 2003	American	Competitive swimmer and first woman to swim across the English Channel.	
Cliff Edwards a.k.a. Ukulele Ike	June 14, 1895	July 17, 1971	American	Singer, ukulele player, minstrel, and musician. Later voiced Jiminy Cricket in Pinocchio.	
Gus Edwards	August 18, 1879	November 7, 1945	German-American	Singer, songwriter and producer. Known for such songs as "School Days" and "In My Merry Oldsmobile."	
Kate Elinore	December 2, 1876	December 30, 1924	American	Singing comedian.	
Duke Ellington	April 29, 1899	May 24, 1974	American	Musician and bandleader who toured the RKO circuit beginning in 1927, headlining at the Palace in 1930. Ellington is considered by many to be one of the founders of modern jazz music.	
Elseeta	1883	February 23, 1903	American	Barefoot toe dancer, known as the 'dancing marvel'	
Julian Eltinge	May 14, 1881	March 7, 1941	American	Female impersonator and actor.	
June Elvidge	June 30, 1893	May 1, 1965	American	Actress.	
Hope Emerson	October 29, 1897	April 25, 1960	American	Comedian known for her large build (6'2", 230 lbs.) who appeared in vaudeville and on Broadway in the 1920s and 1930s. Emerson began working in films in the early 1930s.	
Knute Erickson	May 27, 1873	December 31, 1945	American	Swedish comedian.	
Bert Errol	August 11, 1883	November 28, 1949	British	Female impersonator.	
Leon Errol	July 3, 1881	October 12, 1951	Australian	Comedian.	
Beatriz Escalona	August 20, 1903	April 4, 1979	American	Generally performed in Spanish, well known for the fast-talking underdog character La Chata Noloesca.	
Ruth Etting	November 23, 1896	September 24, 1978	American	Singer and actress	
James Reese Europe	February 22, 1881	May 9, 1919	American	Bandleader of the ragtime "Society Orchestra" which accompanied Vernon and Irene Castle in their ballroom dance act. After serving in World War I and becoming the director of the 369th Infantry Band, Europe (now Lieutenant Europe) toured France and American vaudeville with the band. During this US tour, he began incorporating jazz elements into the ragtime music the band played. It was during this same tour that he was stabbed in the neck by one of his band members.	
Evan E. Evans and Helen Evans (née Hartz)			American	Married vaudeville performers Evan E. Evans (1889–1962) and Helen Hartz (1894–1974) toured the circuit until 1919. Later, they created "The Four Evans - Two Generations of Dance" with daughter Maryetta Evans (1912–2009) and son Lester Evans (1919–1989). The family toured from 1942 to 1960.	
George "Honey Boy" Evans	March 10, 1870	March 12, 1915	American	Minstrel.	
Lizzie Evans	1864		American	Actress and comedian, who made her debut in 1881 at the Standard Theatre with an impersonation of Clip. She owned her own traveling company.	

== F ==
Name	Birth	Death	Nationality	Performance notes	Reference
Nanette Fabray	October 27, 1920	February 22, 2018	American	Singer and actress. Started out as a child singer in vaudeville.	
Elinor Fair	December 21, 1903	April 26, 1957	American	Actress and one of the leading ladies of silent films. Fair made her start in vaudeville as well as musical comedies and stock companies.	
Dustin Farnum	May 27, 1874	July 3, 1939	American	Singer, dancer and actor with his brother, William Farnum.	
William Farnum	July 4, 1876	June 5, 1953	American	Singer, dancer and actor with his brother, Dustin Farnum.	
Edward M. Favor	August 29, 1856	January 10, 1936	American	Singer and comedian.	
Anna Eva Fay	March 31, 1851	May 12, 1927	American	Mind reader.	
Elfie Fay	1881	September 18, 1927	American	Comic singer.	
Frank Fay	November 17, 1897	September 25, 1961	American	Comedian. Considered the "father" of modern stand-up comedy.	
Alice Faye	May 5, 1915	May 9, 1998	American	Actress and singer. Faye's first professional appearance was as a singer and dancer at the age of 14. While appearing in George White's Scandals, Rudy Vallée spotted her and she later became a regular on his radio show. Faye became 20th Century Fox's biggest musical star before Betty Grable was hired in 1940.	
Frank Faylen	December 8, 1905	August 2, 1985	American	Pantomimist, clown and song and dance man.	
Louise Fazenda	June 17, 1895	April 17, 1962	American	Trapeze artist.	
Betty Felsen	June 9, 1905	November 30, 2000	American	Dancer and teacher. Felsen began dance lessons at age 8 and was enrolled in the Pavley-Oukrainsky Ballet's school in 1916. Her first professional performance was in January 1917 at 11 years old. The Pavley-Oukrainsky Ballet merged into the Chicago Opera Association in 1917. Felsen joined its corps de ballet in 1919 and became a ballerina soloist in December 1920. She starred as the Infanta from December 1922 to February 1923 in productions of Adolph Bohm's ballet "The Birthday of the Infanta", in which Andreus Pavley and Serge Oukrainsky also danced. Felsen left the Chicago Opera in 1922 for a vaudeville career, which began with the production of "Rainbo Trail" at Chicago's Million Dollar Rainbo Room, in which Felsen and singer Ruth Etting had leading roles. Starting in the fall of 1923, Felsen and her new partner Jack Broderick, toured the U.S. and Canada in their headline act, Broderick & Felsen. In 1926 and 1927, Broderick & Felsen toured across the United States and Canada starring in two spectacular musical productions, first for about three months in Emil Boreo's “Mirage de Paris” followed by nine months in their own “Ballet Caprice”. After Broderick left the act near the end of 1927, Felsen performed with her troupe as Betty Felsen & Company, appearing in June 1928 at Broadway's Palace Theater in New York City in the final performances of "Ballet Caprice". Felsen left vaudeville in November 1928 and owned performing arts schools, first in Worcester MA until 1932 and then in Cleveland OH until she retired in 1937.	
Arthur Fields	August 6, 1888	March 29, 1953	American	Singer, songwriter and minstrel.	
Benny Fields	June 14, 1894	August 16, 1959	American	Singer, minstrel, and actor.	
Gracie Fields	January 9, 1898	September 27, 1979	British	Singer and comedian, considered of the greatest stars of the British music halls.	
Sidney Fields	February 5, 1898	September 28, 1975	American	In a comedy team with Jack Greenman.	
W. C. Fields	January 29, 1880	December 25, 1946	American	Legendary comedian and actor, who got his first show biz exposure by running away as a teenager and joining a circus as a juggler. Later on, Fields the comic appeared at the Palace not to mention several editions of the Ziegfeld Follies and George White's Scandals. His films, including It's a Gift and The Bank Dick incorporated many of his stage routines.	
Flora Finch	June 17, 1869	January 4, 1940	British-American	Born into a music hall family, Finch also made a splash in American vaudeville, appearing at the palace in January 1922. The actress also appeared with John Bunny in many films.	
Larry Fine	October 5, 1902	January 24, 1975	American	Actor, comedian, musician, and boxer.	
Ella Fitzgerald	April 25, 1917	June 15, 1996	American	Singer, discovered after winning the Apollo Theater's amateur hour while still a teenager and worked the "Chitlin Circuit" (including the Cotton Club) with Chick Webb and his band before getting her first major record deal.	
Bud Flanagan	March 29, 1908	August 31, 1968	American	Appeared in family's vaudeville act from infancy. Appeared later in films as Dennis O'Keefe.	
Jay C. Flippen	March 6, 1898	February 3, 1971	American	White and blackface comedian.	
Henry Fonda	May 16, 1905	August 12, 1982	American	Actor who toured vaudeville with George A. Billings.	
Evan-Burrows Fontaine	October 3, 1898	December 27, 1984	American	Interpretive dancer and Ziegfeld Follies performer.	
Wallace Ford	February 12, 1898	June 11, 1966	British	Actor.	
Four Cohans			American	Family comedy troupe consisting of father Jeremiah "Jere" Cohan (1848–1917), mother Helen "Nellie" Costigan Cohan (1854–1928), daughter Josephine "Josie" Cohan Niblo (1874–1916) and son George M. Cohan (3 or July 4, 1878 – November 5, 1942).	
Harry Fox	May 25, 1882	July 20, 1959	American	Dancer and comedian. Creator of the Fox Trot.	
Imro Fox	May 21, 1862	March 4, 1910	German-American	Magician (The Comic Conjurer)	
Eddie Foy	March 9, 1856	February 16, 1928	American	Comedian and singer.	
Eddie Foy Jr.	February 4, 1905	July 15, 1983	American	Son of Eddie Foy and a member of his Seven Little Foys.	
Irene Franklin	June 13, 1876	June 16, 1941	American	Singing comedian.	
Sidney Franklin	1903	April 6, 1976	American	Bullfighter.	
William Frawley	February 26, 1887	March 3, 1966	American	Actor and comedian, later found greater fame as Fred Mertz on I Love Lucy	
Arthur Freed	September 9, 1894	April 12, 1973	American	Singer and pianist, later known for writing hit songs with Nacio Herb Brown such as "Singin' in the Rain" and "You Were Meant for Me" and for producing film musicals for MGM.	
Kathleen Freeman	February 17, 1919	August 23, 2001	American	Danced at an early age in her parents' vaudeville act.	
Leopoldo Fregoli	July 2, 1867	November 26, 1932	Italian	Protean or quick-change artist.	
Ford Frick	December 19, 1894	April 8, 1978	American	Sportswriter who appeared in vaude.	
Trixie Friganza	November 29, 1870	February 27, 1955	American	Comedian and singer	
Frankie Frisch	September 9, 1897	March 12, 1973	American	Former baseball player who appeared in vaude.	
Joe Frisco	November 4, 1889	February 12, 1958	American	Dancer, minstrel and comedian.	
Loie Fuller	January 15, 1862	1 January 1929	American	Dancer.	
Will Fyffe	February 16, 1885	December 14, 1947	Scottish	Comedian and singer.	

== G ==
Name	Birth	Death	Nationality	Performance notes	Reference
Gallagher and Shean			American (Gallagher) and German-American (Shean)	Comic duo consisting of Edward Gallagher (1873 – May 28, 1929) and Al Shean (May 12, 1868 – August 12, 1949). They had one of the biggest comic hits of the 1920s with their self-named song "Mister Gallagher and Mister Shean." Al Shean (real name Adolph Schönberg) was the uncle of The Marx Brothers	
Tess Gardella	1898	January 3, 1950	American	Performed as iconic blackface character "Aunt Jemima"	
Judy Garland	June 10, 1922	June 22, 1969	American	Singer and actress, toured with two elder siblings as "The Gumm Sisters" (their maiden name) from the age of 2. While in Chicago to perform at the 1934 World's Fair and the Oriental Theater, emcee George Jessel suggested to change their last name to "Garland" to not get laughs from the audience. Young Frances was a big fan of Rudy Vallée's song "Judy" so that stuck as the first name. Older sister Jimmie ran off and married a bandleader after the girls returned home to Lancaster, California. Judy was signed to a contract by MGM shortly thereafter.	
Paul Garner	July 31, 1909	August 8, 2004	American	Comedian.	
William Gaxton	December 2, 1893	February 2, 1963	American	Actor.	
Charlie Gehringer	May 11, 1903	January 21, 1993	American	Baseball player who appeared in vaudeville.	
Gladys George	September 13, 1904	December 8, 1954	American	Toured with her family act, "The Three Clares", later called "Little Gladys George and Company."	
Sylvia Gerrish	May 1860	December 8, 1906	American	Musical comedy and light opera performer, known as the "Girl with the Poetical Legs"	
George Gershwin	September 26, 1896	July 11, 1937	American	Pianist, songwriter and composer, Gershwin accompanied Nora Bayes and Louise Dresser. After his brief foray into vaudeville, Gershwin became one of the most celebrated American composers of the early 20th century.	
Dorothy Gibson	May 17, 1889	February 17, 1946	American	Actress.	
Ella Margaret Gibson	September 14, 1894	October 21, 1964	American	Actress.	
Billy Gilbert	September 12, 1894	September 23, 1971	American	Comedian and actor known for his sneeze routines.	
L. Wolfe Gilbert	August 31, 1886	July 12, 1970	Russian-American	Singer and songwriter.	
Jack Gilford	1907	1990	American	Actor and comedian.	
Charles Sidney Gilpin	November 20, 1878	May 6, 1930	American	Actor.	
Lottie Gilson	January 2, 1862	June 10, 1912	American	Soubrette and the first vaudevillian to use a singing stooge.	
George Givot	1903 or c. 1901	June 7, 1984	American	Greek dialect comedian	
Billy Glason	September 10, 1904 (uncertain)	January 1985	American	Singing comedian and monologist.	
Frank Glazer	February 19, 1915	January 13, 2015	American	Pianist.	
Madeline Gleason	1903	1979	American	Singer and dancer.	
Dorothy Glenton	May 10, 1877		British	Singer under the name "Dainty Dorothy Glenton, The English Singing Soubrette". Dorothy Glenton Kerr.	
Elinor Glyn	October 17, 1864	September 23, 1943	British	Novelist and monologist (usually under her pen name "Madame Glyn"), coined the phrase "It Girl".	
George Fuller Golden	1868	February 17, 1912	American	Singer, dancer and monologist.	
Horace Goldin	December 17, 1867	August 22, 1939	Polish	Magician, the first one to play the Palace in 1913.	
Lefty Gomez	November 26, 1908	February 17, 1989	American	Former baseball player and monologist.	
Nathaniel Carl Goodwin	July 25, 1857	January 31, 1919	American	Actor and comedian.	
David Gorcey	February 6, 1921	October 23, 1984	American	Singer. Later he became a noted disc jockey.	
Bert Gordon	April 8, 1895	November 30, 1974	American	Comedian.	
Gorman Brothers			American	Entertainers and songwriters who often used local news stories to create songs for their act.	
Belle Gordon	c. 1880	Unknown	American	Speed boxer and writer known for her bag-punching routine and her promotion of physical culture. She wrote the book Physical Culture for Women, the first fitness book written by a female celebrity athlete.	
Mack Gordon	June 21, 1904	March 1, 1959	American	Actor, singer, and songwriter	
Emmanuel Taylor Gordon	1893	1971	American	Actor.	
Morton Gould	December 10, 1913	February 21, 1996	American	Pianist.	
Hank Gowdy	August 24, 1889	August 1, 1966	American	Former baseball player, singer and comedian.	
Archie Leach	January 18, 1904	November 29, 1986	British	Toured the US with the Penders acrobatic troupe. Was a stilt-walker with the Loumas troupe and served as leading man to actress, Jean Dalrymple, in one-act plays. Also appeared with Fay Wray and Jeanette MacDonald in several musical flops. When signed by Paramount Pictures in 1931, he was told he looked like a "Cary Grant", so his name was changed.	
Charles Grapewin	December 20, 1869	February 2, 1956	American	Actor and comedian, later known to millions of moviegoers as Dorothy's "Uncle Henry" in The Wizard of Oz.	
Gilda Gray	October 24, 1901	December 22, 1959	Polish-American	Dancer who introduced the "Shimmy", a dance involving the shaking of the hips. Gray starred in the Ziegfeld Follies of 1922 and George White's Scandals. Later appeared at the Palace Theater as a headliner.	
Gene Greene	June 9, 1881	April 5, 1930	American	Singer and composer.	
Charlotte Greenwood	June 25, 1890	December 28, 1977	American	Dancer, actress, and comedian, known for her rubbery dance routines.	
Griffin Sisters	1870s	1918	American	African-American performers who started their own booking agency.	
Arthur F. Griffith	July 30, 1880	December 25, 1911	American	Mathematical prodigy.	
Larry Griswold	September 17, 1905	August 24, 1996	American	Acrobat and gymnast.	
Grock	January 10, 1880	July 14, 1959	Swiss	Clown.	
Yvette Guilbert	January 20, 1865	February 2, 1944	French	Chanteuse.	
Texas Guinan	January 12, 1884	November 5, 1933	American	Singer and famed nightclub hostess.	
Louise Gunning	April 1, 1879	July 24, 1960	American	Singer	

== H ==
Name	Birth	Death	Nationality	Performance notes	Reference
Jeanette Hackett	1898	August 16, 1979	American	Dancer with Harry Delmar (September 9, 1892 – August 29, 1954) in the duo Hackett and Delmar.	
Joseph Paul Haggerty	June 16, 1889	May 2, 1973	American	Vaudeville actor, director and producer from New Orleans. Ran a traveling stock show called Haggerty Repertory during the WWI era. Boris Karloff briefly worked for Haggerty in 1918. He settled in North Hollywood and became a pastor at a spiritual Unity Church.	
Jack Haley	August 10, 1898	June 6, 1979	American	Actor and comedian.	
Adelaide Hall	October 20, 1904	November 7, 1993	American - dual British (by marriage)	Singer, actress, dancer, musician. Hall commenced her career on Broadway in 1921 in Shuffle Along and was featured in Runnin' Wild, and starred in Desires of 1927, Blackbirds of 1928, as well as being a big-name headlining act in her own right in variety/vaudeville and on the RKO and T. O. B. A. theatrical circuits across the USA during the late 1920s and early 1930s before heading to Europe where she continued her successful career. Hall was honoured by Guinness World Records as being the world's longest recording artist in the 20th Century.	
Nan Halperin	1898	May 30, 1963	Russian-American	Singer and comedian	
Walter Hampden	June 30, 1879	June 11, 1955	American	Actor.	
Hunter Hancock	1916	August 4, 2004	American	Singer. Later he became a noted disc jockey.	
Lou Handman	September 10, 1894	December 9, 1956	American	Pianist and songwriter.	
W. C. Handy	November 16, 1873	March 28, 1958	American	Musician and composer known as "The Father of the Blues."	
Fred Haney	April 25, 1896	November 9, 1977	American	Former baseball player.	
Poodles Hanneford	1892	December 9, 1967	British	Clown and bareback horse rider	
Theodore Hardeen	March 4, 1876	June 12, 1945	Hungarian	Magician and escape artist; Harry Houdini's brother.	
Oliver Hardy	January 18, 1882	August 7, 1957	American	Was briefly a singer in Vaudeville in Florida in 1913 before entering films. Was teamed with Stan Laurel at Roach Studios forming Laurel and Hardy in the late 1920s.	
Otis Harlan	December 29, 1865	January 21, 1940	American	Actor, minstrel, and comedian. Appeared in a burlesque called Hell by Renold Wolf in the first show at New York City's Folies Bergère, April 16, 1911.	
Ben Harney	March 6, 1872	March 2, 1938	American	Pianist, singer and songwriter.	
Harrigan and Hart			American	Comic duo composed of Edward Harrigan (October 26, 1844 – June 6, 1911) and Tony Hart (July 25, 1855 – November 4, 1891).	
Marion Harris	April 4, 1896	April 23, 1944	American	Singer.	
Mildred Harris	November 29, 1901	July 20, 1944	American	Harris began as a juvenile actress in vaudeville, burlesque, on the legit stage and on film where she appeared at the age of 9. Later Charlie Chaplin's first wife, she appeared in a playlet, Getting the Money at the Royal Theatre in New York in February 1922.	
Joseph Hart	June 8, 1861	October 3, 1921	American	Vaudeville actor, singer, songwriter and producer. Teamed up with Carrie De Mar and later married her.	
Mark Hart	c. 1873	November 25, 1950	American	Actor and singer. Nephew of Tony Hart who began his career as a teenager performing with Harrison & Hart before starring in Broadway musicals.	
Hartman and Hartman			American	Comedy dance team with Paul (March 1, 1904 – October 2, 1973) and his wife, Grace Hartman (January 7, 1907 – August 8, 1955)	
Morton Harvey	1886	1961	American	Singer.	
Loney Haskell	1870	October 20, 1933	American	Monologist.	
June Havoc	November 8, 1916	March 28, 2010	American	Actress and dancer (as "Baby June"). Sister of Gypsy Rose Lee.	
Mary Hay	August 22, 1901	June 4, 1957	American	Ziegfeld girl and musical comedy actress	
George 'Gabby' Hayes	May 7, 1885	February 9, 1969	American	Actor who appeared in vaudeville before entering films in the 1920s where he was seen mostly in Westerns.	
Grace Hayes	August 23, 1895	February 1, 1989	American	Singer, mother of Peter Lind Hayes.	
Helen Hayes	October 10, 1900	March 17, 1993	American	Actress, known as the "First Lady of the Stage". Started appearing in vaudeville while still a child in "tab" versions of popular plays.	
Peter Lind Hayes	June 25, 1915	April 21, 1998	American	Actor, singer, minstrel, and son of vaudevillian Grace Hayes.	
Rita Hayworth	October 17, 1918	May 14, 1987	American	Dancer in her family's Spanish dancing act, The Dancing Cansinos, led by her father, Eduardo Cansino, Sr.	
Ted Healy	October 1, 1896	December 21, 1937	American	Comedian, minstrel, dancer and singer.	
Henry "Crip" Heard	November 11, 1924	September 11, 1991	American	African-American professional dancer; double amputee with only one leg and one arm.	
Lew Hearn	February 15, 1882	February 1965	Polish	Comedian.	
Hy Heath	1890	1965	American	Comedian and songwriter.	
Millicent Hearst	July 16, 1882	December 5, 1974	American	Performer until she became the wife of William Randolph Hearst.	
Horace Heidt	May 21, 1901	December 1, 1986	American	Pianist and bandleader of the band, "Horace Heidt and His Musical Knights".	
Anna Held	March 8, 1872	August 12, 1918	Polish	Actress and singer. First wife of Florenz Ziegfeld, who produced most of her sketches and plays.	
Edith Helena	1876	1956	American	Singer with a voice spanning four octaves, which also enabled her to perform violin imitations.	
Percy Helton	January 31, 1894	September 11, 1971	American	Appeared in his father's vaudeville act at the age of 2.	
Fletcher Henderson	December 18, 1897	December 28, 1952	American	Pianist, bandleader and composer at one time teamed with Eubie Blake. Henderson later toured with Ethel Waters from 1921 to 1922.	
Ray Henderson	December 1, 1896	December 31, 1970	American	Singer, dancer, songwriter	
Herschel Henlere	December 14, 1890	January 13, 1968	Canadian	Pianist and comedian.	
Beatrice Herford	1868	1952	British-American	Monologist.	
Lillian Herlein	March 11, 1895	April 13, 1971	American	Actress and singer, better known for display of her figure than for the quality of her performances.	
Al Herman	c.1886	July 2, 1967	American	Blackface comedian.	
Woody Herman	May 16, 1913	October 29, 1987	American	Clarinetist, saxophonist, singer and bandleader.	
Juano Hernández	July 19, 1901	July 17, 1970	Puerto Rican	Originally a boxer, Hernández quit the sport in the early 1920s and worked in traveling and minstrel shows, circuses and in vaudeville before entering film.	
Alexander Herrmann billed as "The Great Herrmann"	February 11, 1844	December 11, 1896	German	Magician. Upon his death, Herrmann's wife, Adelaide (1854–1932) took over his act.	
Art Hickman	June 13, 1886	1930	American	Bandleader.	
Hildegarde	February 1, 1906	July 29, 2005	American	Singer.	
Bertha "Chippie" Hill	March 15, 1905	May 7, 1950	American	Blues singer. Initially Hill appeared on the T. O. B. A. circuit as a singer and dancer with the Rabbit Foot Minstrels.	
Daisy and Violet Hilton	February 5, 1908	January 6, 1969	British	Conjoined twins.	
Florence Hines	Unknown	March 10, 1924	American	Singer and male impersonator.	
Raymond Hitchcock	October 22, 1865	November 24, 1929	American	Monologist.	
Mabel Hite	May 30, 1883	October 22, 1912	American	Comedian and musical comedy actress	
Gertrude H. Hoffman	1885	1966	American	Interpretive dancer.	
Ernest Hogan	1859	May 20, 1909	American	Blackface comedian billed as "the Unbleached American." Credited with the creation of the "coon" song and as one of the creators of ragtime music.	
Fay Holderness	April 16, 1881	May 13, 1963	American	Actress.	
Taylor Holmes	May 16, 1878	September 30, 1959	American	Light actor.	
Lou Holtz	April 11, 1893	September 22, 1980	American	Comedian, minstrel, and dialectical singer.	
Bob Hope	May 29, 1903	July 27, 2003	British-American	Actor and comedian.	
DeWolf Hopper	March 30, 1858	September 23, 1935	American	Actor and comedian, known for his recitations of the poem, Casey at the Bat.	
Edna Wallace Hopper	January 17, 1874	December 14, 1959	American	Actress.	
Edward Everett Horton	March 18, 1886	September 29, 1970	American	Comedian, Singer and dancer.	
Allen "Farina" Hoskins	August 9, 1920	July 26, 1980	American	Child actor who appeared in the Our Gang series of short films. He and his sister, Janie, had an act together.	
Harry Houdini	March 24, 1874	October 31, 1926	Hungarian	Magician and escape artist.	
Willie and Eugene Howard			American	Comic duo made up of Willie Howard (1886–1949) and Eugene Howard (1880–1965).	
Curly Howard	October 22, 1903	January 18, 1952	American	Actor.	
Joseph E. Howard	February 12, 1867	May 19, 1961	American	Singer and songwriter.	
Moe Howard	June 19, 1897	May 4, 1975	American	Actor.	
Shemp Howard	March 17, 1895	November 22, 1955	American	Actor.	
Buddy Howe	c. 1910	March 4, 1981	American	Acrobatic dancer.	
Alice Howell	May 5, 1888	April 12, 1961	American	Comedian in an act with her husband, Dick Smith.	
Waite Hoyt	September 9, 1899	August 25, 1984	American	Singer and dancer.	
Doris Humphrey	October 17, 1895	December 29, 1958	American	Dancer.	
Walter Huston	April 6, 1884	April 7, 1950	Canadian	Actor and singer.	
Hyams and McIntyre			American	Husband-wife comedic duo with John Hyams (June 6, 1869 – December 9, 1940) and Leila McIntyre (December 20, 1882 – January 9, 1953). Their daughter, Leila (May 1, 1905 – December 4, 1977), appeared with them as a child.	

== I-J ==
Name	Birth	Death	Nationality	Performance notes	Reference
Imhof, Conn and Corinne			American	Comic trio. Roger Imhof (January or August 15, 1875 – April 15, 1958), his wife, Marcel Corinne or Coreene (d. 1977), and an associate, Conn (about whom, little is known), toured in two comic sketches, "The Pest House" and "Surgeon Louder." Imhof began his career as a circus clown and Irish comic and following vaudeville, appeared as a character actor in a number of Hollywood films.	
May Irwin	June 27, 1862	October 22, 1938	Canadian	Comedian and actress.	
Eddie Jackson	1896	1980	American	Singer and actor	
Joe Jackson Sr.	January 1, 1881	May 14, 1942	Austrian	Bicyclist and comic. Born as Josef Francis Jiranek in Vienna, Austria, where he began competing in cycling races and later appeared in circuses, clowning with his bicycle. Appearing on the American stage for the first time in 1911, Jackson's act involved him entering the stage dressed as a clownish tramp and attempting to ride a bicycle that was slowly falling apart. He would often end his act with a series of athletic riding tricks. He appeared in a number of Broadway shows and Hollywood films including some directed by Mack Sennett. Jackson died on his way to his dressing room following a performance at the Roxy Theatre in 1942.	
Tony Jackson	June 5, 1876	April 20, 1921	American	Pianist, singer and composer. Best known for his song, Pretty Baby, Jackson appeared in vaudeville as a singer and pianist in the Whitman Sisters' New Orleans Troubadours during their tour in 1904. He later appeared with them in 1910. New Orleans born, Jackson began his career playing in the brothels of that city's red-light district, Storyville and following his work in vaudeville, he continued his performing in Chicago.	
Lou Jacobs	January 1, 1903	September 13, 1992	German	Clown.	
Elsie Janis	March 16, 1889	February 26, 1956	American	Singer and actress.	
Marie Jansen	c. 1857	March 20, 1914	American	Singer and actress.	
Frank Jenks	November 4, 1902	May 13, 1962	American	Singer and dancer.	
George Jessel	April 3, 1898	May 23, 1981	American	Actor, monologist, minstrel, and singer.	
Jack Johnson	March 31, 1878	June 10, 1946	American	First African-American Heavyweight Champion of the World. He first appeared on the vaudeville stage in 1909 at Hammerstein's Victoria in New York City, appearing in the ring with white boxer, Kid Cutler. He went on a thirty-week vaudeville tour the following year.	
George W. Johnson	c. 1855	January 23, 1914	American	Singer.	
Ralph Johnstone	1886	November 17, 1910	American	Bicyclist. Originated the trick of jumping a bicycle up and down stairs on one wheel.	
Al Jolson	May 26, 1886	October 23, 1950	Lithuanian-American	Actor, singer, and minstrel.	
Frank "Peg Leg" Jones				Dancer, comedian and minstrel with Arthur Gardner and the Gloom Chasers. Billed as America's Greatest Monopede Dancer. Active 1910–1933.	
Irving Jones	1873	March 11, 1932	American	African-American comedian and ragtime composer.	
Sissieretta Jones	January 5, 1869	June 24, 1933	American	African-American Soprano, often billed as "The Black Patti." Jones was one of the first African-American singers to perform classical and operatic repertoire. Starting in 1896, Jones was the centerpiece of a travelling vaudeville show called the Black Patti Troubadours which included African-American singers, dancers and comedians.	

== K ==
Name	Birth	Death	Nationality	Performance notes	Reference
Armand Kaliz	October 23, 1887	February 1, 1941	French	Actor.	
Bert Kalmar	February 10, 1884	September 18, 1947	American	Magician and songwriter teamed with Harry Ruby.	
Kanazawa Trio			Japanese	Risley Artists. A juggling act made up of Kono, Mankichi and Taw Kanazawa. Alternately known as "The Four Kanazawas" or "The Kanazawa Boys." Active from 1910 to the 1940s.	
Harry Kandel	1885	1943	Russian	Clarinetist and bandleader.	
Helen Kane	August 4, 1904	September 26, 1966	American	Singer and comedian, known as the "boop-oop-a-doop girl".	
Kara	October 17, 1883	April 9, 1939	German	Juggler credited as performing the first "gentleman juggling" act. Dressed in a top hat and tails, Kara would then juggle the numerous props onstage.	
Kawana Trio			Japanese	Risley Artists. Active from 1913 to 1931.	
Beatrice Kay	April 21, 1907	November 8, 1986	American	Singer and actress.	
Birdie Reeve Kay	January 16, 1907	May 31, 1996	American	Speed typist.	
Stubby Kaye	November 11, 1918	December 14, 1997	American	Actor and comedian	
Buster Keaton	October 4, 1895	February 1, 1966	American	Actor, acrobat and comedian. Member of his family's act, The Three Keatons, with his parents, Joe (1867–1946) and Myra (1877–1955).	
Frank Keenan	April 8, 1858	February 24, 1929	American	Actor.	
Harry Kellar	1849	1922	American	Magician.	
Helen Keller	June 27, 1880	June 1, 1968	American	Deafblind lecturer. Appeared with her teacher, Anne Sullivan.	
Keller Sisters and Lynch			American	Singing trio of siblings consisting of Annie Catherine "Nan" Keller (1900–1975), Kathryne Ann "Taddy" Keller (1909–1962) and Frank Lynch (1902–1992).	
Annette Kellermann	July 6, 1887	November 5, 1975	Australian	Olympic swimmer.	
Gene Kelly	August 23, 1912	February 2, 1996	American	Dancer, singer and actor. Appeared in vaudeville with his brother Fred.	
George Kelly	January 16, 1887	June 18, 1974	American	Actor.	
King Kelly	December 31, 1857	November 8, 1894	American	Former baseball player and comedian.	
Kitaro Brothers, Three Kitaro Brothers			Japanese	[Risley Artists. Active from 1916 to 1921.	
Walter Kelly	October 29, 1873	January 6, 1939	American	Monologist and dialectician.	
Pert Kelton	August 23, 1912	February 2, 1996	American	Actress and comedian.	
Ezra Kendall	February 15, 1861	January 23, 1910	American	Monologist.	
Freddie Keppard	February 27, 1890	July 15, 1933	American	Jazz cornetist.	
Jerome Kern	January 27, 1885	November 11, 1945	American	Pianist and accompanist for Edna Wallace Hopper. Kern later became one of the best known musical theatre composers of the early 20th century.	
J. Warren Kerrigan	1916	August 4, 2004	American	Singer. Later he became a noted disc jockey.	
Joseph Kesselring	July 25, 1879	June 9, 1947	American	Actor.	
Victor Kilian	March 6, 1891	March 11, 1979	American	Actor.	
Charles King	1889	1941	American	Song and dance man later on Broadway and in the Ziegfeld Follies.	
Hetty King	1883	September 28, 1972	British	Male impersonator and singer.	
Johnny Kling	February 25, 1875	January 31, 1947	American	Baseball player who appeared in vaudeville with a monologue and a champ billiards exhibition act.	
Fred Kohler	April 20, 1888	October 28, 1938	American	Character actor.	
Kolb and Dill			American	Dutch dialect knockabout comic duo with Clarence Kolb (July 31, 1874 – November 25, 1964) and Max Dill (September 15, 1876 – November 21, 1949).	
Hatsu Kuma	1907		Japanese-American	Japanese-American singer who began performing at the age of four. Performed as part of the Kuma Four and later under her own name. She was a soprano and performed with Anna Chang in the Paramount Pictures short "Two Little Chinese Maids" (1929). Her father was magician Kinjiro Tanaka Kumajo who performed as Aki Kuma and later as Kim Yen Soo. She performed on the Pantages Circuit and was active from 1912 to 1931.	
Tanaka "Aki" Kuma	1884	1963	Japanese-American	Magician Kinjiro Tanaka Kumajo was one of the longest practicing illusionists in vaudeville and was active from 1914 to 1957. He performed as Tanaka Kuma through the 1930s and changed his performing name to Kim Yen Soo from the 1940s to the 1950s.	
Harry Kraton	February 14, 1883	October 10, 1912	African American	Juggler and tightrope walker who specialized in a style of juggling known as hoop rolling. With his wife Ethelyn Kraton he founded the vaudeville act The Kratons. He was an early vocal advocate of supporting black performers in vaudeville.	
Isa Kremer	October 21, 1887	July 7, 1956	Russian-American	Soprano.	

== Sources ==
- Banham, Martin, ed. (1995), The Cambridge Guide to Theatre, Cambridge: Cambridge University Press, ISBN 0-521-43437-8
- Bordman, Gerald; Hischak, Thomas S., eds. (2004), The Oxford Companion to the American Theatre (3rd ed.), New York: Oxford University Press, ISBN 0-19-516986-7
- Cullen, Frank; Hackman, Florence; McNeilly, Donald, eds. (2007), Vaudeville Old & New: An Encyclopedia of Variety Performers in America, New York: Routledge, ISBN 978-0-415-93853-2
- Harrison, Nigel (1988), Songwriters: A Biographical Dictionary with Discographies, Jefferson, North Carolina: McFarland and Co., ISBN 0-7864-0542-2
- Hartnoll, Phyllis, ed. (1983), "Vaudeville", The Oxford Companion to the Theatre (4th ed.), Oxford: Oxford University Press, ISBN 0-19-211546-4
- Katz, Ephraim (2005), The Film Encyclopedia (5th ed.), New York City: HarperCollins, ISBN 0-06-074214-3
- Kenrick, John (1997–2007), Musicals 101.com: The Cyber Encyclopedia of Musical Theatre, TV and Film
- Kernfeld, Barry Dean, ed. (2002a), A-Fuzz, The New Grove Dictionary of Jazz, vol. 1 (2nd ed.), London: Macmillan, ISBN 1-56159-284-6, OCLC 48420843
- Kernfeld, Barry Dean, ed. (2002b), Gabler-Niewood, The New Grove Dictionary of Jazz, vol. 2 (2nd ed.), London: Macmillan, ISBN 1-56159-284-6, OCLC 163210034
- Larkin, Colin, ed. (1998), The Encyclopedia of Popular Music, vol. I (3rd ed.), London: Muze, ISBN 1-56159-237-4
- Laurie, Joe Jr. (1953), Vaudeville: From the Honky-tonks to the Palace, New York: Henry Holt
- Morgan, Thomas L.; Barlow, William (1992), From Cakewalks to Concert Halls: An Illustrated History of Popular Music from 1895 to 1930, Washington, D.C.: Elliott and Clark Publishing, ISBN 978-1-880216-06-4
- Parker, John, ed. (1925), Who's Who in the Theatre: A Biographical Record of the Contemporary Stage (5th ed.), London: Sir Isaac Pitman & Sons, Ltd
- Slide, Anthony (1994), The Encyclopedia of Vaudeville, Westport, Connecticut: Greenwood Press, ISBN 0-313-28027-4
- Slide, Anthony (2002), Silent Players: A Biographical and Autobiographical Study of 100 Silent Film Actors and Actresses, Lexington. Kentucky: University Press of Kentucky, ISBN 0-8131-2249-X
- Southern, Eileen (1982), Biographical Dictionary of Afro-American and African Musicians, Westport, Connecticut: Greenwood Press, ISBN 0-313-21339-9
- Thomas, Nicholas, ed. (1991), Directors, International Dictionary of Films and Filmmakers, vol. 2 (2nd ed.), Detroit: St. James Press, ISBN 1-55862-038-9, OCLC 154103489
- Thomas, Nicholas, ed. (1992), Actors and Actresses, International Dictionary of Films and Filmmakers, vol. 3 (2nd ed.), Detroit: St. James Press, ISBN 1-55862-039-7, OCLC 29295170
