= Ivy Smith =

American blues singer of the 1920s

- Born: United States
- Occupations: Vaudeville performer; singer
- Years active: 1920s
- Label: Paramount Records

Ivy Smith was a vaudeville performer and recording artist in the United States. She used the pseudonyms Ruby Rankin and Sally Sad. She recorded "Sad and Blue" / "Third Alley Blues", "Cincinnati Southern Blues" / "Barrel House Mojo", and "Ninety Nine Years Blues / Too Mean to Cry Blues" (1927) (Iva Smith) at Paramount Records in 1927. She was African American.

She performed as a vaudeville act and recorded with Cow Cow Davenport. They recorded on Vocalion Records.

Smith performed with Cow Cow Davenport as the Chicago Steppers and they recorded together. Their recordings include "Sad and Blue" and "My Own Man Blues". A compilation of their works was released in 1993 and reissued in 2002.

Leroy Pickett also accompanied her.

== Discography ==
- "Got Jelly on My Mind" / "Wringing and Twisting Papa" on Supertone Records/Varsity Records
- "Rising Sun Blues"
- "Sad and Blue"
- "My Own Man Blues"
- "Third Alley Blues"
- "Ninety Nine Years blues"
- "Cincinnati Southern blues"
- "Too Mean to Cry Blues"
- "Barrel House Mojo"
- "Shadow Blues"
- "No Good Man blues"
- "Gin House blues"
- "Mistreated Mamma Blues"
- "Doin' That Thing"
- "Somebody's Got to Knock a Jug"
- "Southern High Waters Blues"
- "Gypsy Woman Blues"
- "Milkman Blues"
- "Alabammy Mistreated"
