= Cow Cow Davenport =

American boogie-woogie piano player (1894–1955)

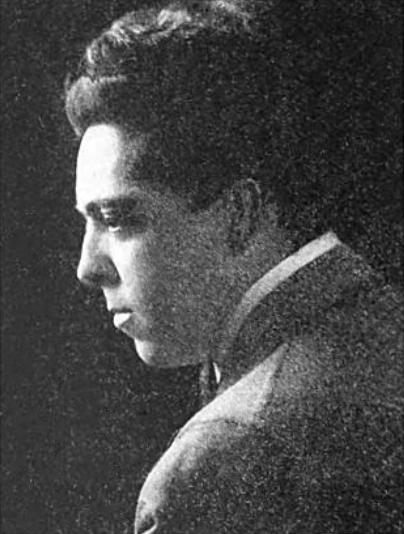

Background information
- Birth name: Charles Edward Davenport
- Born: April 23, 1894 Anniston, Alabama, U.S.
- Died: December 3, 1955 (aged 61) Cleveland, Ohio, U.S.
- Genres: Boogie-woogie, piano blues, vaudeville
- Occupation(s): Pianist, singer, entertainer
- Years active: 1910s–1955
- Labels: Vocalion

Charles Edward "Cow Cow" Davenport (April 23, 1894 – December 3, 1955) was an American boogie-woogie and piano blues player as well as a vaudeville entertainer. He also played the organ and sang.

Davenport, who also made recordings under the pseudonyms of Bat The Humming Bird, George Hamilton and The Georgia Grinder, is a member of the Alabama Music Hall of Fame.

== Career ==
He was born in Anniston, Alabama, United States, one of eight children. Davenport started to play the piano at age 12. His father objected strongly to his musical aspirations and sent him to a theological seminary, where he was expelled for playing ragtime.

Davenport's career began in the 1920s when he joined the K.G. Barkoot Traveling Carnival. His initial profile came as accompanist to blues musicians Dora Carr and Ivy Smith. Davenport and Carr performed as a vaudeville act as "Davenport & Co", and he performed with Smith as the "Chicago Steppers". He also performed with Tampa Red. Davenport recorded for many record labels, and was a talent scout and artist for Vocalion Records. Davenport suffered a stroke in 1938 and lost movement in his hands. He was washing dishes when he was found by the jazz pianist Art Hodes. Hodes assisted in his rehabilitation and helped him find new recording contracts.

His best-known tune was "Cow Cow Blues". The "Cow Cow" in the title referred to a train's cowcatcher. The popularity of the song led to Davenport gaining the nickname "Cow Cow." In 1953, "Cow Cow Blues" was an influence on the Ahmet Ertegun-written "Mess Around" by Ray Charles, which was Charles's first step away from his Nat "King" Cole-esque style, and into the style he would employ throughout the 1950s for Atlantic Records.

"Cow-Cow Boogie (Cuma-Ti-Yi-Yi-Ay)" (1943) was probably named for him, but he did not write it. It was penned by Benny Carter, Gene de Paul and Don Raye. It combined the then popular "Western song" craze (exemplified by Johnny Mercer's "I'm an Old Cowhand") with the big-band boogie-woogie fad. The track was written for the Abbott and Costello film Ride 'Em Cowboy (1942).

Davenport claimed to have been the composer of "Mama Don't Allow It". He also said he had written the Louis Armstrong hit "I'll be Glad When You're Dead (You Rascal You)", but sold the rights and credit to others.

He died in December 1955 in Cleveland, Ohio, of atherosclerosis, and is buried at Evergreen Cemetery in Bedford Heights, Ohio.

== Discography ==
- 1976 – "Cow Cow Blues", in Vocalion 1928–1930 (The Piano Blues Vol. 3), Magpie Records, Magpie PY 4403
- 1979 – Cow Cow Davenport: Alabama Strut, Magpie Records, Magpie PY 1814
- 1979 – Cow Cow Blues, Oldie Blues, OL 2811

== See also ==
- List of boogie woogie musicians
- List of Vaudeville performers
- Anniston-Oxford Metropolitan Area
