= Charles Cane =

American actor (1899–1973)

- Born: Charles Radford Cannefax Jr. April 18, 1899; Springfield, Missouri, U.S.
- Died: November 30, 1973 (aged 74); Los Angeles, California, U.S.
- Resting place: Hollywood Forever Cemetery
- Other name: Charlie Cannefax
- Occupation: Actor
- Years active: 1924–1961

Charles Radford Cannefax Jr. (April 18, 1899 – November 30, 1973) billed initially as Charlie Cannefax, but best known as Charles Cane from the mid-1930s onwards, was an American character actor, singer, and vaudeville performer. He was perhaps best known for his role in the film Bells of Capistrano (1942). Charles was billiard champion Bob Cannefax' younger brother.

== Early life ==
Cannefax was born in Springfield, Missouri, to Martha (née Chambers, later Mrs. E. H. McEwen) and Charles Radford Cannefax. Following his parents' divorce in 1907, he was raised by his mother in St. Louis. There, he attended the Marquette School, where, in 1914, he received an award for his work as a catcher on the Post-Dispatch Public School Baseball League.

== Career ==
Around 1920, Cannefax—who would later be dubbed a "tasty baritone"—moved to New York to further his musical education and hone his skills as a vocalist. Following his 1924 Broadway debut in the revue Artists and Models, he continued working in vaudeville for over a decade; about half of that time—September 1926 to February 1932—was devoted to his partnership with veteran performer Gracie Deagon, billed as "Deagon & Cannefax". Prior to that, he had worked briefly with Florence Fair, and before that, Peggy Fears.

Following his years with Deagon, Cannefax worked in vaudeville primarily as an M.C., most notably throughout the summer of 1933, when, as the "madcap master of monkey business", he co-hosted Long Branch, New Jersey's annual Walkathon Dance Marathon.

On April 7, 1934, the Long Branch Daily Record reported that, in addition to providing pre-screening live entertainment at Long Branch's Paramount Theatre (and serving as M.C. both before and after), Cannefax would be appearing onscreen in that evening's short subject, Come to Dinner, Vitaphone's much-touted Dinner at Eight parody, in which an uncredited assortment of lesser-known talent stands in for Dinner's all-star cast. For his part, Cannefax—as Dr. Wayne Talcum—requires but three letters tweaked to send up Edmund Lowe's Dr. Talbot.

In the winter of 1941, following a near seven-year absence from stage or screen, (Note: The sole exceptions being his alleged bits in two considerably more obscure short subjects, Dublin in Brass (1935) and 1940's Sucker List (regarding each of which, as of August 2025, IMDb appears to be the only cited source), as well as his once-reported-and-never-again-referenced addition to the cast of an unspecified weekly radio show on WOR, hosted by the young Benny Rubin.) the actor, now named Charles Cane, made his official stage debut as part of the touring company of William Saroyan's The Time of Your Life, a well-received performance that also served to jump-start Cane's screen acting career. It also may have sparked a friendship between Cane and his The Time of Your Life co-star "Bill" Bendix, (Note: Bendix portrayed officer Krupp to Cane's McCarthy, the longshoreman.) as he appeared in at least six subsequent Bendix films, most notably in the injury-riddled 1944 filming of Eugene O'Neill's The Hairy Ape. The others include Don Juan Quilligan (1944), as well as Duffy's Tavern (1944), The Dark Corner (1946), Kill the Umpire (1950), and Dangerous Mission (1954). During World War II, he participated in USO shows, alongside performers such as Albert Dekker, Adele Mara, Frank Mitchell, and Joe DeRita.

== Personal life and death ==
Cane was married at least once.

Cane was a prominent member of both the Motion Picture Alliance for the Preservation of American Ideals and Hollywood's American Legion Post 43.

Cane died November 30, 1973, at age 74, at the Motion Picture & Television Country House and Hospital in Woodland Hills, Los Angeles, where he had been brought after suffering an apparent stroke. Eight days later, his remains were interred at Hollywood Memorial Park.

== Selected filmography ==
- Come to Dinner (short, 1934) – Dr. Wayne Talcum (uncredited)
- My Favorite Blonde (1942) – Turk O'Flaherty
- Beyond the Blue Horizon (1942) – Broderick
- Bells of Capistrano (1942) – Tex North
- Lucky Jordan (1942) – Sergeant
- Hello, Frisco, Hello (1943) – O'Reilly
- Mr. Lucky (1943) – Comstock
- Henry Aldrich Haunts a House (1943) – Clannahan
- The Lady and the Monster (1944) – Grimes
- The Hairy Ape (1944) – Gantry
- Casanova Brown (1944) – Hicks
- Don Juan Quilligan (1945) – Artie Mossrock
- Nob Hill (1945) – Chips Conlon
- The Kid from Brooklyn (1946) – Willard
- Dead Reckoning (1947) – Lt. Kincaid
- The Guilt of Janet Ames (1947) – Walker
- Framed (1947) – Manager, Truck Company
- Joe Palooka in Fighting Mad (1948) – George Wendell
- The Dark Past (1948) – Sheriff
- The Blonde Bandit (1949) – Lt. Ralph Metzger
- Prison Warden (1949) – Quarry Supervisor Captain Bill Radford
- Southside 1-1000 (1950) – Harris (1950)
- Born Yesterday (1950) – Policeman
- The Abbott and Costello Show
  - "The Politician" (1951) – District Councilman (uncredited)
  - "Amnesia" (1951) – Used Car Dealer (uncredited)
- Native Son (1951) – Detective Britten
- Scandal Sheet (1952) – Heeney
- Kansas City Confidential (1952) – Detective Mullins
- Schlitz Playhouse of the Stars
  - "Miracle in the Night" (1953) – Mackinoff
- The Big Heat (1953) – Hopkins
- Dangerous Mission (1954) – Barrett
- Medic
  - "The Wild Intruder" (1954) – Tom
- Marty (1955) – Lou, Bartender
- Fireside Theatre
  - "An Argument with Death" (1955) – Cates (as Charlie Cane)
- A Day of Fury (1956) – Duggen
- Crossroads
  - "A Holiday for Father Jim" (1956) – Priest's Police Escort
- Richard Diamond, Private Detective
  - "One Foot in the Grave" (1958) – Lt. Kevin Anders
- My Sister Eileen
  - "Eileen and the Intern" (1960) – Police Officer
- The Roaring 20's
  - "Bold Edition" (1960) – Harry Taylor
- The Gambler Wore a Gun (1961) – Kelly Barnum
