= Kid Millions =

1934 film by Roy Del Ruth

- Theatrical poster
- Directed by: Roy Del Ruth
- Written by: Nunnally Johnson; Nat Perrin
- Produced by: Samuel Goldwyn
- Starring: Eddie Cantor; Ann Sothern; George Murphy; Ethel Merman; Block and Sully; Nicholas Brothers; Goldwyn Girls
- Music by: Score: Alfred Newman; Songs: Burton Lane (music); Walter Donaldson (music); Irving Berlin (music); Alfred Newman (music); Gaston Lyle (music); Harold Adamson (lyrics); Gus Kahn (lyrics); Irving Berlin (lyrics); George Leybourne (lyrics)
- Production company: Samuel Goldwyn Productions
- Distributed by: United Artists
- Release date: November 10, 1934
- Running time: 90 minutes
- Country: United States
- Language: English
- Box office: $2 million

Kid Millions is a 1934 American musical film directed by Roy Del Ruth, produced by Samuel Goldwyn Productions, and starring Eddie Cantor. Its elaborate "Ice Cream Fantasy Finale" production number was filmed in three-strip Technicolor, one of the earliest uses of that process in a feature-length film.

== Plot ==
In New York City, 1934, jazz singer Dot Clark and her shady gangster boyfriend, Louie The Lug ("An Earful of Music"), are introduced. After having an affair with the deceased Professor Edward Wilson, Dot is now technically his common-law wife and heiress to $77 million. She has to go to Egypt to claim the money, and sets off with Louie in hopes of getting the cash. Former assistant to Edward Wilson, Gerald Lane, informs the law offices of Benton, Loring, and Slade of Professor Wilson's death and the fact that Edward's son, Eddie Wilson, Jr, is the rightful heir to the money. Mr. Slade, the lawyer, goes to a barge in Brooklyn where Eddie is living with his adopted father, Pops, an old stevedore, and his three sons, Oscar, Adolph, and Herman, who roughhouse Eddie. However, Eddie is managing to live a nice life nonetheless, with his girlfriend, Nora 'Toots', and his care for all the kids on the barge. He dreams of the day when he will have enough money to live his own life outside of the dirty barge ("When My Ship Comes In"). Moments later, Eddie is informed that he has inherited the $77 million and boards a ship bound for Egypt to claim the money. Aboard the ship is Colonel Henry Larrabee, a gentleman from Virginia who sponsored Eddie, Sr's exploration endeavors and wants a share of the money, as well. Eddie befriends his beautiful niece, Joan, and Dot and Louie realize that they are not the only ones traveling to Egypt. In an elaborate scheme to trick Eddie into signing over the inheritance, Dot disguises herself as Eddie's mother and almost succeeds in duping him, but Louie ruins the plan at the last minute. Meanwhile, Gerald Lane has boarded the ship and he is revealed to be in love with Joan Larrabee.

In the ship's bar, the Colonel, Gerald, and Louie realize they are all traveling for the same reason, and Gerald calls Colonel Larrabee a liar. Joan overhears and becomes angry with him, much to Jerry's dismay. Louie tries to get Eddie to hand over the cash by trying to bump him off by pushing him off the ship's deck in a wheelchair. The duo thinks they have succeeded in getting rid of Eddie, but they are foiled again. Eddie tries to help Jerry win back Joan, and suggests they rehearse a number for the ship's concert the next evening. They rehearse ("Your Head On My Shoulder"), but Joan is still frosty toward him. At the ship's concert, Jerry, Eddie, Dot, Joan, and members of the chorus perform a show number featuring a specialty tap by the Nicholas Brothers ("Mandy N' Me"). The ship lands in Alexandria, Egypt, and Joan is still angry with Jerry. Eddie, still convinced that Dot is his mother and Louie is his uncle, wants to see a magician performing at the ship's port. When the magician taunts Louie and calls him a coward, Louie gets in the magic basket and ends up getting beaten by Egyptian slaves. Eddie chases a little dog running through the marketplace and lands literally in the lap of the sheikh's daughter, Princess Fanya, who falls instantly in love with Eddie. She forces him to come with her back to the palace, where Eddie meets her father, Sheikh Mulhulla, and her fiancé, Ben Ali, who is extremely jealous. Fanya hyperbolizes the encounter with the dog, saying that Eddie saved her from a lion's attack instead of a puppy.

Eddie then is invited to stay at the palace, much to Fanya's delight. However, soon Sheikh Mulhulla learns of the Americans being in Egypt who have come to take the $77 million treasure that he believes is rightfully his. He tells Eddie about this and Eddie begins to worry about his mother and his uncle, along with the others. In a comical scene, the sheikh and Eddie smoke a hookah pipe and the sheikh tells him of the affair he is having with a famous dancer who lives in the village. The harem women try to seduce Eddie, but he is steadfast to remain faithful to Nora 'Toots' ("Okay Toots"). Princess Fanya has a plot to get Eddie to marry her, and she tells her father that Eddie kissed her on the camel when they first met. The sheikh then decrees that Eddie must marry Fanya or die, and has him suspended over a large bowl of soup. Eddie then agrees to marry Fanya, and is kept in a room on a dog collar until the next morning, when Ben Ali comes in with a gun in a jealous rage. Eddie convinces Ben Ali that he does not want to marry Fanya, and Ben Ali is convinced and lets him go. However, Joan, Jerry, the Colonel, Dot, and Louie arrive at the palace and are immediately accosted by the guards. In the tomb, Eddie and the men disguise themselves as the spirits of the sheikh's ancestors and tell him to let the Americans go free. The sheikh is so scared by the prophecies, he agrees to let them go on one condition: Eddie will never be able to see Fanya ever again. He agrees and boards a plane home to New York City, where he uses the inheritance to open a free ice cream factory with Toots, thus realizing their lifelong dream ("Ice Cream Fantasy Finale").

== Cast ==
- Eddie Cantor as Eddie Wilson Jr., the deceased Professor Edward Wilson's son and the now heir
- Ann Sothern as Joan Larabee, niece to Colonel Larrabee who is in love with Jerry Lane
- Ethel Merman as Dot Clark, a jazz singer and con artist out to get the Wilson fortune
- George Murphy as Jerry Lane, assistant to the deceased Professor Edward Wilson who befriends Eddie Wilson Jr. and is in love with Joan Larrabee
- Berton Churchill as Col. Harrison Larabee, uncle to Joan Larrabee, a Southern gentleman from Virginia who funded one of Professor Wilson's expeditions
- Warren Hymer as Louie the Lug, Dot Clark's dim-witted gangster boyfriend and manager who travels with her to get the Wilson fortune
- Paul Harvey as Sheik Mulhulla, an Egyptian sheik whose daughter, Princess Fanya, falls in love with Eddie Wilson
- Jesse Block as Ben Ali, Princess Fanya's jealous fiancé who believes that Eddie is out to steal Fanya from him
- Eve Sully as Princess Fanya, the sheik's daffy daughter who falls in love with Eddie after he saves her from a small dog
- Otto Hoffman as Khoot, Sheikh Mulhulla's head advisor
- Stanley Fields as Oscar, one of Eddie's stepbrothers who lives on the barge
- Edgar Kennedy as Herman, one of Eddie's stepbrothers who lives on the barge
- Jack Kennedy as Pop Wilson, Eddie's adopted father, an old stevedore who lives on the barge with his three sons
- John Kelly as Adolph, one of Eddie's stepbrothers who lives on the barge
- Doris Davenport as Nora 'Toots', Eddie's girlfriend who lives on the barge and dreams of marrying him when he gets his money
- The Nicholas Brothers
- Tommy Bond as Tommy, one of Eddie's kid friends who lives on the barge
- Donald Haines as Kid Band Member (uncredited)
- Sam McDaniel as Ship's Steward (uncredited)
- Dix Davis as Little Boy in Ice Cream Number (uncredited)
- Tim Davis as Little Boy in Ice Cream Number (uncredited)
- Tor Johnson as Torturer (uncredited)

== Production notes ==
- The film's "ice cream fantasy sequence" was Goldwyn's first attempt at film with three-strip Technicolor. The cast of Our Gang appears among the children in this sequence.
- Cantor originally introduced the song "Mandy", with Marilyn Miller, in the Ziegfeld Follies of 1919.
- Among the Goldwyn Girls in this film are Lucille Ball, Paulette Goddard, Mae Madison, Jane Hamilton, Lynne Carver, Helen Wood, and Barbara Pepper.

== Reception ==
The film was very successful at the box office.

The film is recognized by American Film Institute in 2006: AFI's Greatest Movie Musicals – nominated

== See also ==
- List of American films of 1934
- List of early color feature films
