= Edwina Barry =

American vaudeville performer and comedian

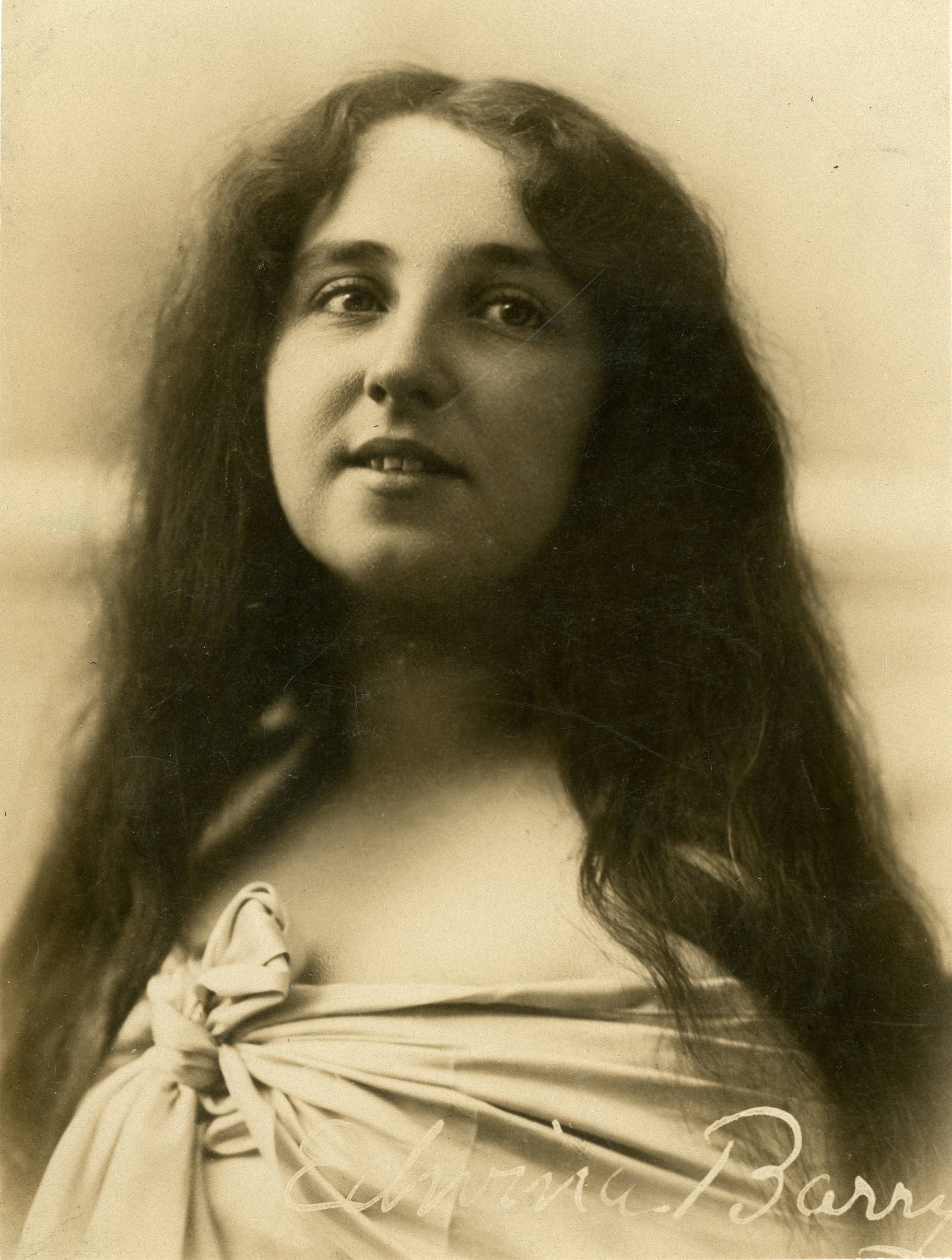
- Edwina Barry, 1912
- Born: July 3, 1886; Boston, Massachusetts
- Died: July 9, 1988 (aged 102); Los Angeles, California
- Occupations: vaudeville performer, comedian

Edwina Barry (July 3, 1886 – July 9, 1988) was an American vaudeville performer and comedian. She was billed alongside stars including Sophie Tucker, Eddie Cantor, Al Jolson, Eva Tanguay, Kate Smith, and Harry Lauder, among others.

== Early life and education ==
Edwina Barry was born in Boston, Massachusetts on July 3, 1886. Her father, Edward Barry, was a Shakesperean scholar and manager of the Howard Theatre. She was educated at the Sisters of Notre Dame Convent and trained in theater by her brother, playwright and director Jimmy Barry.

== Career ==
Early in her career, Barry acted in stock companies, playing boys' parts and ingénue roles. In 1908, she appeared in her first starring role in Faust by Porter J. White.

From 1909 until at least 1915, Barry toured the United States with her own company, Miss Edwina Barry and Co., as the star of the serio-comic sketch "The Home Breaker," which was written by her brother, Jimmy Barry. In the sketch, Barry played Dotty Plumdaffy, a servant girl who kisses men and then keeps their photograph, and in doing so, almost causes the breakup of a marriage.

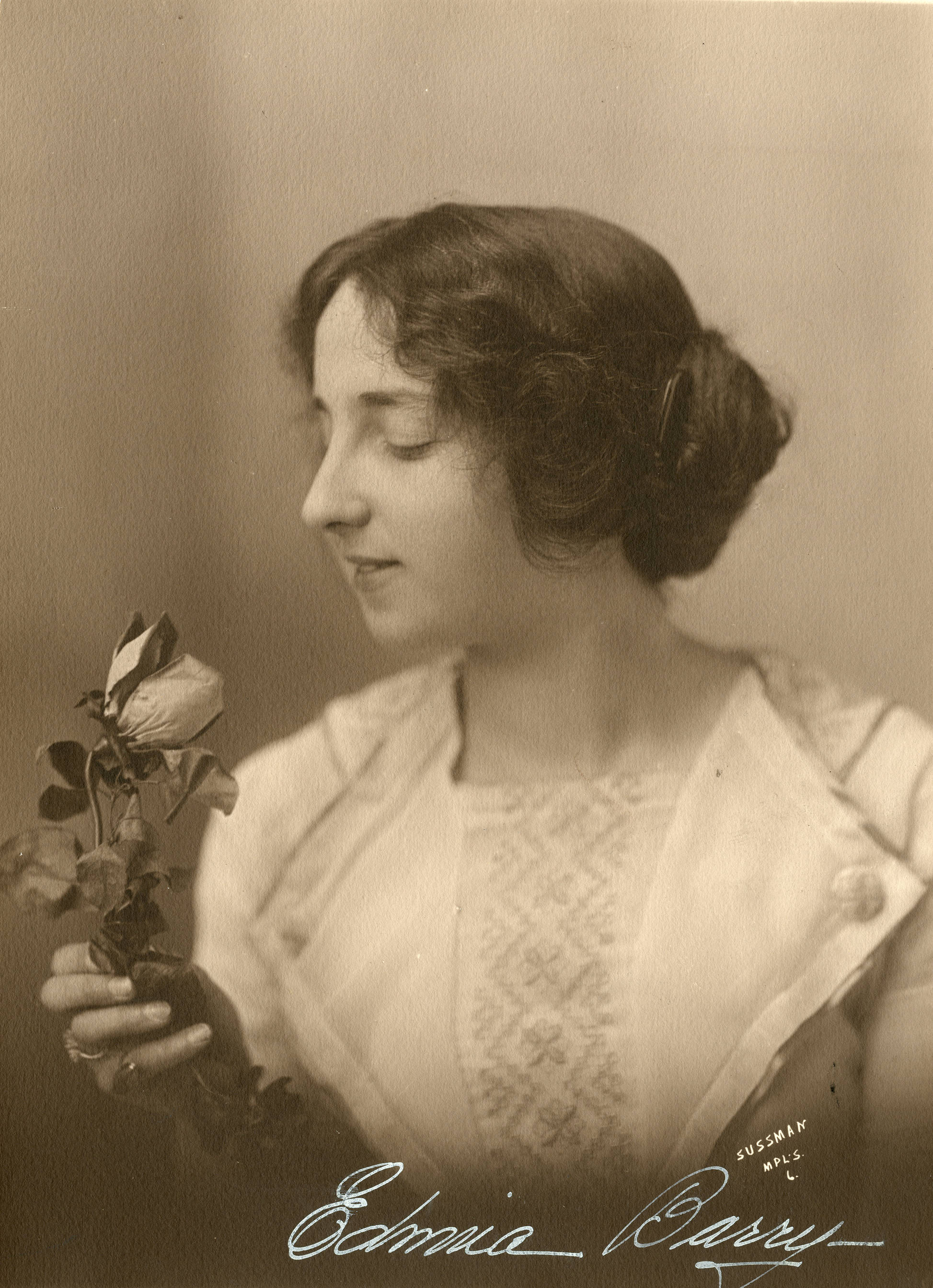
Signed photograph of Edwina Barry, 1912

During World War I, Barry toured the world, performing in Europe, South Africa, and Australia. In the early 1920s, Barry embarked on another international tour, during which she performed in India, Burma, Indonesia, China, Japan, and the Philippines, as well as South Africa, Australia, New Zealand, and Canada. While in South Africa, she performed with the African Theatres Company.

In the 1940s, Barry hosted a talk radio show in Shanghai, China and also worked as a columnist for American newspapers. By the Second World War, Barry returned to the United States, where she worked as a librarian for the U.S. Navy.

== Private life and death ==
In 1920, Barry settled in Hollywood after returning to the United States from an international tour. She never married and had no children.

On June 28, 1988, Barry was admitted to the hospital after sustaining a concussion following a fall. She died of pneumonia at the UCLA Medical Center on July 9, 1988. She had recently turned 102. Upon Barry's death, the Actors Fund, which had planned a birthday celebration in her honor, cancelled the event. Performers including Carroll O'Connor, Ed Asner, and Donald O'Connor had been expected to attend.

After her death, Dale Olson said of Barry, "She was very popular all over the country and, in fact, all over the world for about a 20-year period."
