= Bells of Capistrano =

1942 film

- Theatrical release poster
- Directed by: William Morgan
- Screenplay by: Lawrence Kimble
- Produced by: Harry Grey
- Starring: Gene Autry; Smiley Burnette; Virginia Grey
- Cinematography: Reggie Lanning
- Edited by: Edward Mann
- Music by: Morton Scott (supervisor)
- Production company: Republic Pictures
- Distributed by: Republic Pictures
- Release date: September 15, 1942 (USA)
- Running time: 73 minutes
- Country: United States
- Language: English
- Budget: $132,288 or $500,000

Bells of Capistrano is a 1942 American Western film directed by William Morgan and starring Gene Autry, Smiley Burnette, and Virginia Grey. Written by Lawrence Kimble, it is a story of a singing cowboy who helps out a beautiful rodeo owner when her competitor gets too rough. The film features the popular songs "Forgive Me", "At Sundown", "In Old Capistrano", and "Don't Bite The Hand That's Feeding You". Bells of Capistrano was Autry's final film before entering the service for World War II.

== Plot ==
The World Wide Wild West Show is a struggling rodeo outfit about to be taken over by the powerful Johnson Brothers rodeo. Daniel "Pop" McCracken (Lucien Littlefield) and Melinda "Ma" McCracken (Claire Du Brey) from World Wide get into a brawl with Jed (Tris Coffin) and Stag (Morgan Conway) Johnson after the brothers catch the desperate McCrackens vandalizing their advertisements. Singing cowboy Gene Autry (Gene Autry) and his sidekick Frog Millhouse (Smiley Burnette) come upon the brawl and try to break up the fight, but Frog's little brother Tadpole draws the sheriff's attention, and soon they are all taken to jail, where Gene sings a song for his new friends.

The next day, Jennifer Benton (Virginia Grey), the owner of World Wide, bails Ma and Pop out of jail. After meeting Gene, she agrees to hire him hoping his singing will bring in people and improve business. Soon, Gene is drawing in the crowds eager to see the Singing Bronco Buster. Jed and Stag are not pleased with World Wide's new success, having planned to take over the company prior to their upcoming important engagements in Capistrano. As part of their efforts to acquire World Wide, Stag has been wooing Jennifer, telling his brother he will even marry her in order to close the business deal. Gene tries to warn her about Stag's motives, but she doesn't believe him.

Meanwhile, Jed and Jackie Laval (Marla Shelton), Stag's former girl friend, pay Gene a call and offer him a job with the Johnson Brothers rodeo for more money. When Gene declines, they warn him that they will take World Wide apart by force if they have to. When Gene gets into a fistfight with Jed, Jennifer mistakenly assumes it is Gene's fault. Determined to eliminate the competition, Jed returns to the World Wide camp with a gang of thugs, who proceed to destroy the camp's equipment. When Jennifer's horse bolts during the attack, Gene comes to her rescue, though she again blames him for the disturbance. When Stag offers to pay for the damage, a grateful Jennifer decides to marry him and sell him World Wide.

To prevent Jennifer from making a big mistake, Gene prevents the sale by having the deputy sheriff attach the rodeo for back wages. Broken-hearted by her failure as an owner, Jennifer hands the show over to Ma, Pop, and the other rodeo workers, telling them that she was going to give them the proceeds of the sale anyway. Later, when Jennifer tells Stag that she cannot sell the company after all, Stag's negative reaction convinces her that Gene was right about Stag's motives for romancing her. Jennifer returns to the World Wide camp, where her friends assure her that she is still the owner.

The World Wide Wild West Show travels to Capistrano and a big fiesta to celebrate their upcoming opening is organized. Unknown to Jennifer and the others, the Johnsons have planted one of their thugs, Jenkins, in Capistrano, and Jennifer unwittingly hires him. On the night of the fiesta, Jenkins sets fire to their campground, and Pop is injured while trying to rescue the horses. When Gene learns that a special doctor is needed to perform a delicate operation on Pop, he accepts a position with the Johnson Brothers who agree to advance him the money needed for Pop's operation—it's the only way he can raise that much money.

Without revealing the seriousness of Pop's condition to Jennifer and the others, Gene leaves for the Johnson Brothers rodeo. When Gene discovers the connection between the Johnson Brothers and Jenkins, he agrees not to turn them in for arson if they pay Pop's medical expenses and buy new equipment for World Wide. The Johnson Brothers agree to Gene's proposal. Later, Jennifer and the others are relieved to learn that Gene did not desert them. After Pop recovers from his operation, Gene performs in a special show attended by a booking agent from New York City. The agent is so impressed, he books the entire group for a rodeo at Madison Square Gardens.

== Cast ==
- Gene Autry as Gene Autry
- Smiley Burnette as Frog Millhouse
- Virginia Grey as Jennifer Benton
- Lucien Littlefield as Daniel "Pop" McCracken
- Morgan Conway as Stag Johnson
- Claire Du Brey as Melinda "Ma" McCracken
- Charles Cane as Tex North
- Joe Strauch Jr. as Tadpole Millhouse
- Marla Shelton as Jackie Laval
- Tris Coffin as Jed Johnson
- Guy Usher as Sheriff
- Ken Christy as Deputy
- Robert J. Wilke as Roustabout (uncredited)
- Champion as Gene's Horse (uncredited)

== Production ==
=== Casting ===
Bells of Capistrano was the only Gene Autry film to feature Virginia Grey. Born March 22, 1917, in Los Angeles, Grey was the daughter of director Ray Grey. One of her early babysitters was film star Gloria Swanson. Grey made her first film appearance at the age of ten in the silent film Uncle Tom's Cabin (1927). After a few years of acting, she left movies to finish her education. In the 1930s, Grey returned to the screen in bit parts and eventually signed a contract with Metro-Goldwyn-Mayer, appearing in several feature films, including Another Thin Man (1939), Hullabaloo (1940), and The Big Store (1941). In 1942, she left MGM and signed with several different studios in the coming years. In the 1950s and 1960s, Grey appeared in popular melodramas, such as All That Heaven Allows (1955), Back Street (1961), and Madame X (1966). In the 1940s, Grey was romantically involved with Clark Gable. Following the death of Carole Lombard, Gable and Grey were often seen together socially, and many expected the two to marry, including Grey herself. In 1949, Gable married Lady Sylvia Ashley, and reportedly, Grey was heartbroken. According to friends, her great love for Gable was the reason she never married. Toward the end of her career, Grey appeared regularly on television programs such as General Electric Theater, Bonanza, and The Virginian. She died in Woodland Hills, California in 2004 at the age of 84.

=== Filming and budget ===
Bells of Capistrano was filmed July 7–24, 1941. The film had an operating budget of $132,288 (equal to $2,606,693 today), and a negative cost of $132,229.

=== Filming locations ===
- Agoura Ranch, Agoura, California, USA
- Albertson Ranch, Agoura, California, USA
- Iverson Ranch, 1 Iverson Lane, Chatsworth, Los Angeles, California, USA
- Littlerock Dam, Pearblossom, California, USA
- Monogram Ranch, Los Angeles, California, USA
- Thousand Oaks, Los Angeles, California, USA
- Republic Pictures Backlot, Studio City, Los Angeles, California, USA

=== Stunt work ===
- Yakima Cunutt
- George Havens (Joe Strauch Jr.'s stunt double)
- Cliff Lyons
- Post Park
- Tex Terry (Smiley Burnette's stunt double)
- Nellie Walker (Virginia Grey's stunt double)
- Bill Yrigoyen
- Joe Yrigoyen (Gene Autry's stunt double)

=== Soundtrack ===
- "Forgive Me" (Milton Ager, Jack Yellen) by Gene Autry
- "At Sundown" (Walter Donaldson) by Gene Autry
- "Fort Worth Jail" (Dick Reinhart) by Gene Autry
- "In Old Capistrano" (Fred Stryker, Jerry Charleston) by Gene Autry and extras, Composed by Manuel Esperon
- "Don't Bite The Hand That's Feeding You" (Jimmie Morgan, Thomas Hoier) by Gene Autry

== Military service ==
After being notified to report for induction as a technical sergeant in the Army Air Force, Autry finalized principal photography on Bells of Capistrano on July 24, 1942. Two days later, on Sunday July 26, during the airing of the Melody Ranch radio show, Autry took the oath from Lt. Col. Edward Shaifer. He reported for duty at Fort Sheridan on August 3, 1942.
