= The Davene Gymnasts =

Maria (maiden name Marian Booth), William, and Lucy Davene

The Davene Gymnasts, sometimes styled French Troupe Davene were an English troupe of acrobats and aerialists active during the 19th century. While the group claimed to be French and related by blood publicly, this was a fiction invented to market the group. None of the performers were French or actually named Davene, but adopted the surname as a stage pseudonym.

== History ==
The Davene Gymnasts were led by alleged "patriarch" William M. Davene who was born in London, England on October 1, 1846. His real surname was Davis, and Davene was adopted to make the troupe sound French. At the age of 18 he married the English artificial-flower-maker Marian Booth. William and Maria were joined by three other performers, Lucy, Lizzie, and Vara, to form their acrobatic "family act". Together they formed a gymnastics and acrobatic act with which they toured Europe. In reality, not all of the performers were biologically related, but they all adopted the stage surname Davene and the fiction was used to market the group to the public. In Belgium they were presented a gold medal by King Leopold III.

The Davene Gymnasts performed across Central and South America prior to giving their first performance in the United States in New Jersey in 1879. In 1881 the Davene Troupe was performing with the Barnum & Bailey Circus, with Lizzie featured in a catapult act. Twice each day she lay down atop the spring-based catapult and was launched in the air, doing flips in the air as she traveled about 75 feet into a net. During a May 3, 1881 engagement in Wilkes-Barre, Pennsylvania, the timing of her mid-air flips was off and she landed in the net head-first. According to The Billboard, when she called out for help she said "I cannot move hand or foot." She was taken to the hospital and found to be tetraplegic. Rather than cancel the shows, Lucy Davene, took her place in the catapult through the end of the engagement. Lizzie died from her injuries the following week.

According to The Billboard, it helped to spark "much bitter criticism against the use of the catapult acts" in 1881. A day after her burial, The Philadelphia Times strongly condemned catapult acts. The mayor of Philadelphia, also the president of the Society to Protect Children from Cruelty, declared that those responsible should be charged with involuntary manslaughter. It did not happen, as Lizzie was an adult, but the circus was subject to harsh criticism by the press and public, which also cast scrutiny on Lucy, still a minor, who did not suffer an accident in the catapult but who was seriously injured in a trapeze accident the previous year.

According to The New York Times, although there were no formal services, her burial ceremony was "crowded with members of the Barnum circus and representatives of the guild of gymnasts." She was interred at Green-Wood Cemetery in Brooklyn, New York.

The Davene Gymnasts continued to perform in circuses, variety theatre, and vaudeville; touring widely from 1893-1890. After Lucy's death a new "family member" in the group was a boy named Bob. In 1888 William divorced Marian and married Vara who had been posing as a his daughter since she was 8 years old. They were not in fact related.
