= Dora Carr =

American blues and boogie-woogie singer of the 1920s

Dora Carr was an American musician, best known for her work in the early and mid-1920s with pianist and arranger Cow Cow Davenport. Carr is best remembered for the song "Cow Cow Blues" and playing boogie-woogie. Dora Carr was also a vocalist who went on tour in the 1920s performing at venues.

According to Harlem Renaissance Lives (edited by Henry Louis Gates and Evelyn Brooks Higginbotham), Davenport and Carr met in 1922 and toured the Theater Owners Booking Association as "Davenport and Company". Eight songs were released by Vocalion Records in the vaudevillian duet style. The band broke up when Carr left Davenport for another man, whom she later married.
