= Gracie Deagon =

American actress

- Born: Grace O'Connor Deagon; 1893 or 1894; Lockport, New York, U.S.
- Died: After 1966
- Occupations: Actress, vaudevillian, writer
- Spouse(s): Homer Dickinson (m. 1911; div. 1918 m. 1918; div. 1921)

Grace O'Connor Deagon (1893 or 1894), known professionally as Gracie Deagon, was an American vaudevillian, stage and radio actress and writer, known for her exceptionally unaffected child impersonations,

== Early life and career ==
Raised in Springfield, Ohio, Deagon was a daughter of the then popular vaudeville team Kitty (née Andres) and Edwin H. Deagon (who also headed their own theatre company); her uncle was Broadway actor Arthur Deagan.

In 1924, Deagon provided the lyrics to Belle Baker's "Pretending", the first song composed by the already famous singer.

During her vaudeville career, Deagon had three straight men. The first, from 1912 to 1922, was her then husband Homer Dickinson; then came Wilbur—a.k.a. Jack—Mack. Deagan's third and final partner, from 1926 until at least February 1932, was Charlie Cannefax.

In the summer of 1934, Deagon and fellow vaudevillian Jack Usher co-starred in the radio sitcom Babs and Don, scripted by Deagon and airing on the "Nation's Station", WLW in Cincinnati.

== Personal life ==
Thrice married and thrice divorced, Deagon was the wife of fellow vaudevillian Homer Cissero Dickinson from 1911 to 1918, 1918 to 1921, and 1921 to 1922. They had one child, a son, Homer J. Dickinson.

Predeceased by her son, Deagon was residing in Costa Mesa, California as of April 1967

== Theatre credits ==
- East Lynne
- The Moonshiner's Daughter
- Lena Rivers
- Way Down East
- Cinderella on Broadway (June 24, 1920 – September 25, 1920) – Performer (as Grace Deagon)
- Hello, Alexander (April 1921) – Kitty
- The G Man (February 10, 12, 15 and 17, 1936) – Performer
- The Old Soak (April 13, 1936) – Nellie, the hired girl
- Dulcy (May 20–21, 1936) – Dulcy Parker Smith
- Chalk Dust (November 9–15, 22–28, 1936) – Third Teacher
- Babes in Toyland (December 28, 1936 – January 9, 1937) – Jane
- It Can't Happen Here (January 28 – February 5, 1937) – Switchboard Operator
- No More Peace (April 23 – May 1, 1937) – The Angel
- Green Grow the Lilacs (October 4–9, 1937) – Cowboy singer
