= Block and Sully =

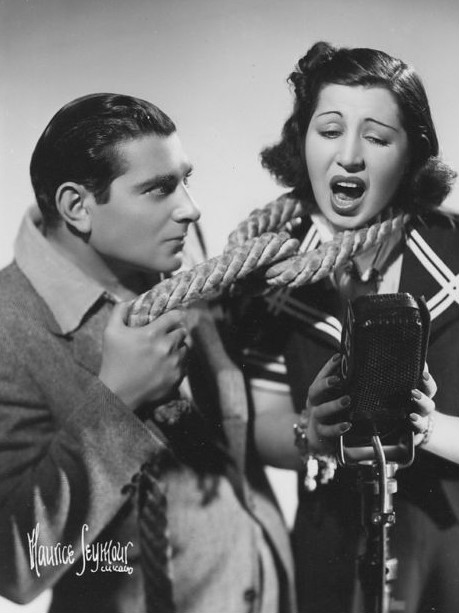
Block and Sully, circa 1930s-'40s

Block and Sully were an American husband and wife vaudeville team who performed during the years 1926 to 1948. They were Jesse Block (December 16, 1900 – March 22, 1983) and his wife Eva Sully (December 28, 1901 – August 7, 1990).

== Early life and career in vaudeville ==
Jesse Block was born in New York City. He started performing in vaudeville as a child, getting his first break as a member of Gus Edwards' Song Revue of 1915. Later, he developed a song-and-dance act and toured for four years as one half of a duo with Frances Dunlap. In 1926, he was introduced to Eve Sully by Bert Gordon. Sully, born in Atlantic City, New Jersey, was touring in a song-and-dance act with Blossom MacDonald, sister of Jeanette MacDonald, but she soon joined Block to form a crosstalk comedy act. The couple married in 1930.

Block and Sully toured together for three years before they played the Palace Theatre for the first time in 1929, and headlined there both in April and October 1930. They were popular mainstays of the vaudeville circuit, and friends as well as rivals of George Burns and Gracie Allen. Some of Sully's catchphrases, such as "Some nerve!", and "I’ll bet you tell that to all the girls!", were later attributed to Allen rather than Sully. Both of the double acts used material written by Al Boasberg; Block and Sully also used material from Herman Wouk.

== Later life ==
In the early 1930s, Block and Sully ventured into radio and had their own program. One of the cast members was a young Arlene Francis. The couple also appeared in a number of film shorts, and were featured in the 1934 feature Kid Millions starring their good friend Eddie Cantor. During World War II, they toured with the USO. In 1948, Block and Sully played their last vaudeville engagement at Loew's State.

After leaving show business in 1946, Block became a stockbroker with Bache and Company, retiring in 1973. The couple remained happily married until Block died at age 82 on March 22, 1983, at home in Manhattan. Eve Sully Block died of cardiovascular collapse on August 7, 1990, at Tisch Hospital in Manhattan. She was 88 years old.
