= The Four Evans =

- Born: Evan E. Evans: 1889 Helen Evans (née Hartz): 1894 Maryetta Evans: 1912 Lester E. Evans: 1919
- Origin: Homestead, Pennsylvania, United States
- Died: Evan E. Evans: 1962, Homestead, Pennsylvania Helen Evans: 1974 (age 80) Maryetta Evans: 2009 (age 96), West Palm Beach, Florida Lester E. Evans: 1989 (age 59), Pittsburgh, Pennsylvania
- Genres: Soft shoe dance, tap dance
- Years active: 1942-1960

The Evans Family had a vaudeville family dance act in the mid-1900s. The Evans were the only complete American family in a war zone during World War II in the course of their performance tours of US military bases. The Evans family continued touring the US through 1960, playing engagements in all major cities and making television appearances.

== Background ==
Evan E. Evans began dancing as a child in Pittsburgh, Pennsylvania. In 1910, Evan married Helen Hartz, a fellow vaudeville circuit dancer. The married couple toured together and continued to tour following the birth of their first child, Maryetta Evans, in 1912, then settled back in Pittsburgh around the time of the birth of their second child, Lester Evans. Evan and Helen operated a dance studio in Homestead, and Maryetta and Lester were educated in Pittsburgh. Maryetta went on to study at the Art Institute of Pittsburgh, and Lester at University of Pittsburgh. The family developed their new touring act and took to the stage as "Four Evans: Two Generations of Dance."

== "The Four Evans" ==
In 1942, The Evans Family were scouted by the United Service Organizations (USO) to perform at American military service locations. Between 1942 and 1953, the Four Evans completed USO tours of Europe, Africa, Japan, Korea, Greenland, and the United States. The Evans performed in Bastogne during the Battle of the Bulge, and escaped Belgium with Pennsylvania's 28th Division. Between 1946 and 1960, the Four Evans danced in major cities throughout the United States and played extended engagements at New York's Paramount Theatre. In 1944, the family performed for the Lord Mayor of London, England; in 1947, they danced for the Premier of Canada; in 1949, they appeared on WDTV, Pittsburgh's (and Pennsylvania's) first television station. In 1953, while traveling internationally, the Evans family survived a plane crash in the sea of Japan.

== After "The Four Evans" ==
From 1960, the Evans family operated a dance studio in Homestead. In 1962, Evan E. Evans died in Homestead at age 73. Lester Evans taught at Point Park University, and at Pittsburgh Creative and Performing Arts School, and he owned the Homestead studio from 1962. In 1974, Lester and Maryetta appeared on Mister Rogers' Neighborhood. Also in 1974, Helen Evans died at age 80. In the 1980s, Lester and Maryetta Evans toured again as "The Four Evans," with younger Evans family members. After Lester Evans died in 1989, Maryetta moved to Florida, where she continued to dance and instruct. In the late 1990s, while living in Palm Springs, Florida, Maryetta danced with The Fabulous Palm Springs Follies. In 1999, The Guinness Book of World Records named her the World's Oldest Professional Show Dancer at age 86. Maryetta Evans died in 2009.
