= Bert Errol =

English singer and female impersonator

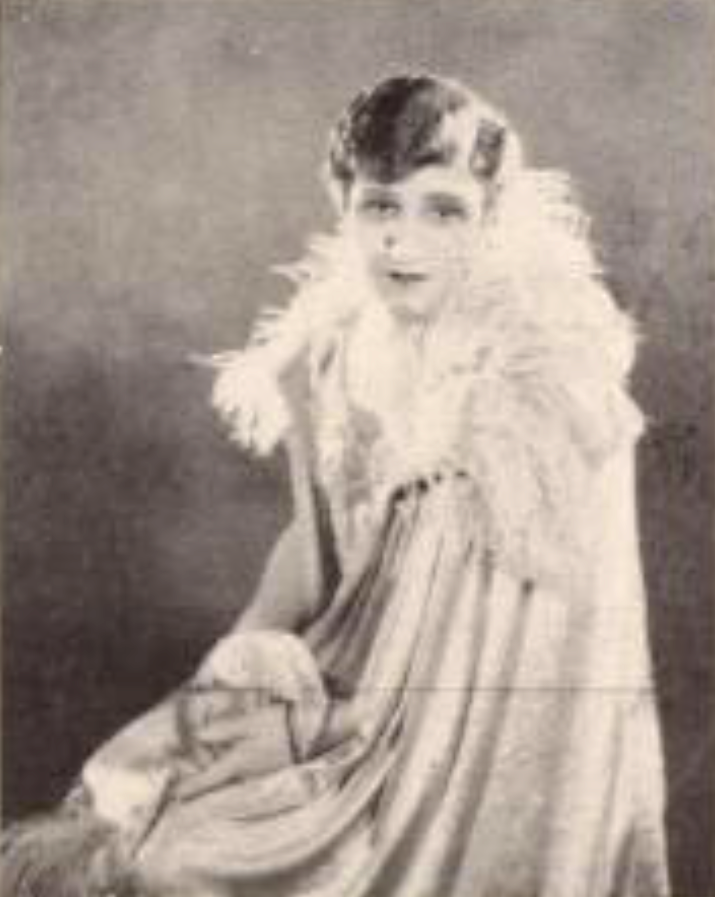
- Bert Errol in 1927
- Born: Isaac Whitehouse; 11 August 1883; Birmingham, England
- Died: 28 November 1949 (aged 66); Brighton, Sussex, England
- Occupations: Singer, female impersonator, entertainer
- Years active: 1901–1940s

Bert Errol (born Isaac Whitehouse; 11 August 1883 – 28 November 1949) was a British singer and female impersonator, who was a popular entertainer in both Britain and the United States.

== Life and career ==
Born in Birmingham, he had a voice ranging from tenor to falsetto. From the age of 18, he worked in music halls and concert parties, and in the all-male Harry Reynolds' Minstrels, before making his first London appearance in 1908, billed as "The Famous Male Soprano and Double-Voiced Vocalist". His act included parodies of musical comedy stars, as well as invented personalities.

He first visited the United States in 1910, when there was publicity over the fact that he had paid $1,000 customs duty on his gowns, many of which he had bought from Henry Paget, the Marquess of Anglesey. He returned to the U.S. several times, receiving good reviews and touring on the Orpheum and Keith vaudeville circuits, and also toured Europe, Australia, New Zealand, South Africa and Canada. He was said to have a "Tetrazzini voice". He always appeared with his wife, Ray Hartley, whom he presented on stage, "for fear of any suspicion of homosexuality", and who assisted with his rapid changes of clothes.

In later years, he developed the comedy side of his act, and became known in Britain for his performances as a pantomime dame. In 1935, he appeared in the pantomime Cinderella on BBC radio, and was described as "one of the finest female impersonators of modern times, who must have played in nearly every music-hall in the country".

He died in Brighton in 1949, aged 66.
