= Mr. and Mrs. Jimmy Barry =

American vaudeville performers

Mr. Jimmy Barry
- Born: James Maurice Barry; September 9, 1867; Boston, Massachusetts, U.S.
- Died: January 4, 1940 (aged 72)
- Occupation: Vaudeville performer
- Family: Edwina Barry (sister)

James Maurice Barry (September 9, 1867 – January 4, 1940) and his wife Josephine Barry (née Richards; December 28, 1870 – September 29, 1958) were American vaudeville entertainers, who were usually billed as Mr. and Mrs. Jimmy Barry.

Mrs. Jimmy Barry
- Born: Josephine Richards; December 28, 1870; Plymouth, Pennsylvania, U.S.
- Died: September 29, 1958 (aged 87)
- Other names: Josephine Barry; Josie Richards
- Occupation: Vaudeville performer

== Careers ==
Jimmy Barry was born in Boston, Massachusetts, in 1867 according to his baptism record, though some sources state 1868. His father was an Irish-born harness maker. He started his acting career in local stock companies, and met Josie Richards, from Plymouth, Pennsylvania; they married in 1895. They worked together as serious actors for several years, but in 1899 debuted as Mr. and Mrs. Barry in vaudeville.

They performed comic sketches of their own devising, with original songs and dances, and reportedly presented a subtle form of humour as opposed to clowning. They generally acted as unsophisticated rustic characters, "rubes", with cross-talking between them. Their sketches included "The Skin Game" (c. 1905), "Village Cut-Ups" (c. 1906), "At Hensfoot Corners" (c. 1908), and "The Rube" (c. 1914). Their dialogue was described as "brightly written", and Jimmy Barry as "ever funny in his country bumpkin character". For some of the couple's performances they were augmented by Jimmy's brother, William H. Barry (1871–1959).

Jimmy and Josie Barry lived at Dingmans Ferry, Delaware Township, Pike County, Pennsylvania. They continued to perform well into the 1920s, before retiring towards the end of the decade. Jimmy Barry died in 1940 at the age of 72. Josie Barry died in 1958, aged 87.

Jimmy Barry's younger sister, Edwina Barry (1886–1988), was also a vaudeville performer and comedian. She worked with, married, and later divorced, Josie Barry's brother, William Richards (1873–1946).
