= Billy Glason =

William Glason (born William Isador Glazer; possibly September 10, 1893 – January 1985) was an American vaudeville entertainer, songwriter and comedian.

Sources differ as to whether he was born in Russia in 1893, travelling to the United States as a baby; or whether he was born in Boston, Massachusetts, in either 1898 or 1904. His parents were Russian Jewish immigrants. As a child in Boston, he began work selling newspapers, and then started performing in small theatres and selling new songs, initially by singing them to crowds at beaches to gauge their reaction. He developed his own patter between the songs and started performing in vaudeville in Boston. By the 1920s, he was an established vaudeville performer, as a singer and comedian, on the Keith circuit, often as an opening act.

He was a mainstay of vaudeville during the 1930s, interspersing his monologues with popular songs of the time. He also wrote songs for others, such as "Why Do They Always Say No?" and "He'll Always Be One Of Those Guys". In 1939, he hosted his own radio comedy show on WMCA in New York, Bill Glason and His Gang, also featuring his wife Paula. From the late 1940s, his main activity was in writing jokes for other comedians and after-dinner speakers. He produced a regular newsletter, Fun-Master Monthly, which he advertised for sale in the columns of magazines such as Variety, and produced some anthologies of jokes, many of which were long-established rather than his own. The jokes were used by performers such as Bob Hope, Jackie Gleason, Steve Allen, Ed Sullivan and Johnny Carson.

He died in New York in 1985.
