= Harry Kraton =

African American juggler and tightrope walker

Harry Kraton, sometimes given as Harry Craton and Harry Krayton, (14 February 1883 – 10 October 1912) was an African American juggler and tightrope walker who performed in minstrel shows and in vaudeville from 1899 until his death in 1912 at the age of 29. As a juggler he specialized in a genre of juggling known as hoop rolling. With his wife Ethelyn Kraton, he co-founded the hoop rolling vaudeville act The Kratons in 1906 and spent the remainder of his life touring in vaudeville in the United States and to Europe where he performed in music halls. Kraton was an early advocate for black performers on the American stage. He wrote an op-ed in Variety magazine arguing for the acceptance of black performers in vaudeville. In 1909 he was a charter member of the Colored Vaudeville Benevolent Association.

== Life and career ==
Harry Kraton was born in Lynchburg, Virginia on 14 February 1883 to African-American parents. He began his career as a blackface minstrel show performer in 1899; working as both a juggler and tightrope walker. He achieved acclaim for his skills as a juggler in the genre of hoop rolling; a style of juggling he began performing in c. 1902. He reportedly could keep 24 hoops going at one time. As a juggler in this genre he was referred to as a "hoop controller". Prominent black arts critic Sylvester Russell wrote the following about Kraton:

"Dressed in white duck pants and white shoes with plum colored shirt, and a high collar to catch the sweat, with nice hair parted near the middle, the partly self-esteemed boy wonder controlled hoops careless enough to convince the average novice that he is perfection unsophisticated."

Kraton toured with a variety of minstrel shows from 1899-1903, among them Oliver Scott's Refined Negro Minstrels, Richards & Pringle's Famous Georgia Minstrels and Fields and Hanson Minstrels (John F. Fields and Frank Hanson). He then worked with Sissieretta Jones and the Black Patti's Troubadours; performing with them on their annual tours from 1904-1908. The 1905-1906 touring show was entitled The Virginia Mammy.

While Kraton's early career was predominantly in minstrel shows, he also performed in vaudeville as early as 1900 with the Big Black Vaudeville Company. With his wife Ethelyn Kraton he formed a hoop rolling vaudeville act known as The Kratons in 1906. This group also occasionally included his brothers, John and Delma, and also utilized performers outside the Kraton family, including Fred Diegman, Tom Johnson, Tom Hart and married couple Clarence and Leonora Johnson. The Kraton's biggest success was a show called "Hoopville" in which multiple hoops were manipulated across a stage set simultaneously with all of the hoop manipulators off stage and remaining unseen.

Kraton spent the latter portion of his career touring the vaudeville circuit in the United States, and performing in music halls in Europe. In 1907 he wrote an article for Variety magazine in which he advocated for support of black entertainers in vaudeville. In 1909 he was a charter member of the Colored Vaudeville Benevolent Association.

Kraton died at the age of 29 in a sanatorium in Bournemouth, England on 10 October 1912.
