= Pat Casey (vaudeville) =

- Photo taken for the Moving Picture World Magazine on January 4, 1913
- Born: Springfield, Massachusetts
- Died: February 7, 1962 (aged 87)
- Occupations: Vaudeville booking agent, theatrical manager and film industry conciliator

Pat Casey (died February 7, 1962) was a well-known vaudeville booking agent and was later a film industry mediator. In 1908, Pat Casey founded his own booking agency (the Pat Casey Agency) to great success, becoming one of the best-known figures in the vaudeville industry. In his later career, Pat Casey served as the chairman of the producers’ labor committee of the Association of Motion Picture Producers.

== Early life ==
Pat Casey was born in Springfield, Massachusetts. When he was 15, Casey secured the exclusive rights to sell peanuts and candy at the local Springfield Baseball grounds over the summers of 1893 and 1895 for $75, and reportedly earned $45 to $55 a day. In May 1895, Casey acquired the rights to run a ticket booth outside the main tent of a 20-wagon circus called Tucker’s Giant Shows. Casey eventually became an assistant manager for the circus, touring New England for 6 weeks before the circus went bankrupt in Skowhegan, Maine.

== Vaudeville career ==
Casey’s theatrical beginnings can be traced back to when he returned to Springfield between the years of 1894 and 1895, where he found employment as a treasurer of a Parlor Theatre. He later worked in another theatre called the Gilmore, before it was destroyed by a fire in 1896. The Gilmore was later rebuilt and leased in the fall of 1896 by a firm called Finnegan & Shea. Casey was appointed as manager of the Gilmore by the firm, eventually acting as a general manager for their vaudeville circuit. This included their other theatres, including the Nelson, Park, and Worcester. Casey stayed with the company for 8 years.

Eventually, Casey went to New York to book various talents, where it was also reported that he held various positions on Broadway. One of these positions led Casey to become acquainted with William Morris, who later founded the William Morris Agency. The two had reportedly travelled to Winnipeg for business; after returning, Morris put Casey in charge of his offices at the time, where Casey took over much of the day-to-day administrative tasks.

When the United Booking Offices offered Casey “enticing inducements to engage with United” around the same time that Williams-Hammerstein left the Morris offices, Casey refused their offer, opting to stay with William Morris instead. It was through Morris that Casey was eventually put into contact with Klaw and Erlanger, who arranged for Casey to manage their “advanced vaudeville” campaign. This led to Casey being well acquainted with A. L. Erlanger. It was commonly reported that Erlanger spoke very highly of Pat Casey, so much so that in one New York Herald interview, Erlanger mentioned Pat Casey’s name in nearly every paragraph. Casey’s later success in the vaudeville industry with his agency business could be attributed to his positive relationship with Erlanger, where it was reported that Casey wouldn't make an important decision without asking for Erlanger’s advice. However, many believed that Casey could have achieved a similar level of success under more average conditions without his help. It was also through Klaw and Erlanger that Casey garnered the attention of other notable vaudeville figures such as B. F. Keith, Martin Beck, E. F. Albee, and Percy G. Williams. Though Casey was offered managerial positions from Klaw and Erlanger, he eventually decided to create an agency business of his own, as he valued being free and unrestricted.

== Booking and motion picture ventures ==
The Pat Casey Agency was a booking agency that was located in the St. James Building in New York City. It opened in the summer of 1908 to great success, becoming as important as other pre-established booking agencies in vaudeville. The Agency featured many prominent clients throughout its operating years, including Harry Lauder, Phil Baker, Ted Lewis, and Nora Bays.

While Pat Casey's success with his booking agency was commonly attributed to his connections with Erlanger, it was also due to how knowledgeable Casey was when it came to producing and managing theatre overall. He was often praised for “his ability to select acts for his attention” and “intuitive insight into theatricals.”

By December 1908, Pat Casey had booked “more acts than any three agents in the country” and had “more acts booked and working under his exclusive direction than any other agent.” Casey’s success with booking acts in vaudeville came from how well he secured them over his competitors. It was very common for Casey to split his commission 5% with the managers of those acts to weed out competition. Later reports from 1912 estimated that he was making at least $50,000 per year.

In 1913, Pat Casey was announced as the general manager of a newly established motion picture company called the Protective Amusement Company, which would feature two plays a week starting September 1 of that year. The company was founded jointly by theatrical producer A. H. Woods and Klaw and Erlanger, who aimed to turn their successful plays into films. It was noted that Pat Casey had expressed interest in moving into the film industry around this time, so such a move wasn't out of the ordinary. Casey’s plans for the motion picture company were described as “practical” and “simple.” He argued that a company like Selig, which distributes a film to be shown only on one night, was a waste of potential profits. His plans instead called for two films a week and would be given a trial run. Along with the melodramas provided by A. H. Woods, and other plays in their possession, Casey was confident that they were suited for film adaptations and would bring good money.

By 1914, the Pat Casey Agency had also branched out into becoming a motion picture bureau.

In 1917, William Morris and Pat Casey consolidated their booking agencies under the Pat Casey name. While the merger caught many by surprise in the vaudeville industry, it was speculated to occur for a while. This arrangement mainly came about due to Casey being unable to fully dedicate his time to his booking agency, as he had to balance it with his position in the Vaudeville Managers’ Protective Association.

In June 1929, the Pat Casey Agency was rebranded as the Weeden & Schultz Agency, operated by George O. Weeden and John A. Schultz. By this point, Pat Casey had been the head of the Vaudeville Managers’ Protective Association for years.

== Later career ==
In 1916, a year before consolidating his booking agency with Morris, Casey had been working under the Vaudeville Managers Association (VMPA) as their general representative, having been unanimously selected for the position. He worked at the VMPA for six years before he was recruited by the Keith-Albee vaudeville circuit as a talent executive. In 1926, Casey left the circuit to work at the Association of Motion Picture Producers (AMPP), where he served as chairman of their producers’ labor committee for 21 years.

Throughout Casey’s career with the AMPP, he was often described as “one of the fairest producer representatives.” In that role, Casey worked with other studio executives to mitigate issues such as the negotiations of union contracts and controversies. In 1937, Casey negotiated with Mechanics Local, raising worker wages by 10 cents and reducing working hours from 44 to 40 for all eastern studios.

After his retirement in 1947, Pat Casey served as a labor relations adviser for five years. His original position at the AMPP was later taken over by Charles Boren, who was personally recommended by Casey for the role.

== Death ==
On February 7, 1962, Pat Casey passed away at the age of 87 in the Presbyterian Hospital. He was a Roman Catholic who had remained in good health—having neither smoked nor drunk his entire life—up until his death, during which he reported experiencing stomach pains two days prior. A Requiem Mass was held in his hometown of Springfield, Massachusetts, at St. Michael’s Cathedral. Another Requiem Mass was held at St. Patrick’s Cathedral in New York, while a Memorial Mass was held in Hollywood. Casey’s only known relatives were two cousins, George Leary and Mary Moriarty.
