= Gustav Walter (impresario) =

Gustav Walter was a 19th-century German impresario who managed vaudeville theaters in San Francisco and founded the Orpheum Circuit — a chain of vaudeville theaters from the Pacific Coast to the Mid-West.

Walter immigrated to the US in 1865. He moved to San Francisco in 1874, where he opened a concert saloon called The Fountain on Kearny Street. He managed the Vienna Gardens on Stockton Street and then opened the Wigwam Variety Hall on the same street. In 1886, he then built a grand theater on O'Farrell Street which would seat 3500. This was the Orpheum Opera House which staged performances of opera, plays and vaudeville. The prices started at 10 cents for the balcony or children up to 50 cents for a box. This was low at the time and the theater soon became the most popular in San Francisco. Following this success, he opened another Orpheum in Los Angeles and then another in Sacramento. This was the start of the successful Orpheum Circuit which became a major chain of theatres.

Walter overspent on expensive acts from Europe such as Parisian ballet or a Hungarian boys military band. His chronic shortage of money led him the lease the Orpheum to John Cort in 1891. The financial panic of 1893 forced Cort out and Walter returned to manage the Orpheum with Morris Meyerfeld, Jr. providing the finance and business acumen. Meyerfield organized a chain of theaters from the Pacific coast to the Mid-West. The Kansas City Orpheum opened in 1898 but then Gustav Walter died of appendicitis on 9 May. Meyerfield immediately announced that the show would go on and the Orpheum circuit continued to expand with Martin Beck as its general manager.
