= New York Star =

New York Star may refer to:

- New York Star (1800s newspaper), a New York City newspaper from about 1868 to 1891
- New York Star, a theatrical weekly magazine founded in 1908 which merged with the Vaudeville News in 1926
- New York Star (1948–1949), a newspaper that lasted from 1948 and 1949
- a fictional newspaper in the 1946 film Night Editor
- a fictional newspaper in the television show Sex and the City

== See also ==
- New York Stars (disambiguation)
