= Balasis family acrobatic act =

Balasis family acrobatic act was performed by the Balasic family who were performers who specialized in acrobatics and appeared in variety shows, vaudeville theaters and circuses of Europe, Canada and America from the early 1900s to 1930 with a special feat billed as "The Boys With The Steel Heads", "The World's Only Head to Head Jugglers".

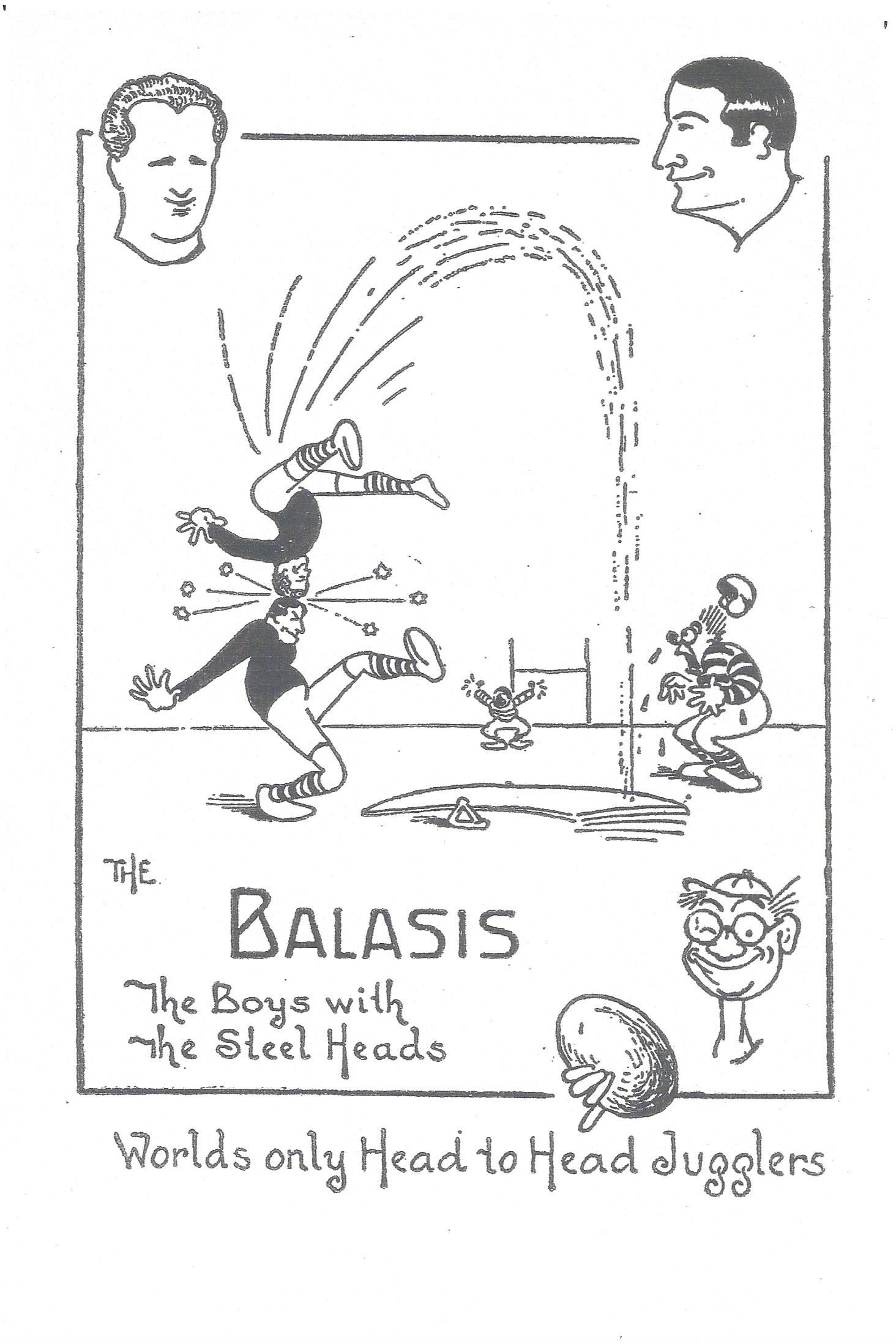
Advertising postcard for the Balasis acrobatic act performing in Variety / Vaudeville Theaters in Europe in 1922.

== Early history ==
Named in 1957 to the Hall of Circus Immortals of the Circus Museum in Hamburg, Germany, the act originated in Austria-Hungary in the late 1800s. The family act followed the marriage of Victor Balasic Sr. to Paula Enders in Hungary in 1894 and the births of two sons: Alfred Joseph Balasic in 1896 and Victor Balasic Jr. in 1897. Paula was from a circus family. Paula as a young woman had performed bareback riding in Europe with her sister Maria Enders Rieffenach with the Circus Enders, owned by their parents. The Circus Enders was sold in 1905 after the death of Paula's father. Victor Balasic Sr. and Paula Enders Balasic then formed their own acrobatic act and began performing in European theaters and circuses as "The Great Merkels". The stage name was taken from the name of Victor Balasic Sr.’s former tutor, Carl Merkel.

== The act ==
"The Great Merkels" act was originally composed of Victor Sr., Paula and their sons Alfred and Victor Jr. The act consisted of gymnastics and acrobatics, with the family using naval costumes and sets as a theme. Acrobatic acts were highly regarded in Europe and often headlined shows. The performance, which normally lasted for 10 to 15 minutes, included strength and balance feats performed by different members of the family. Some of the feats involved the use of gymnastic apparatus. The Balasics' in 1906 created a shoulder-mounted frame which was worn by Paula and which held up an axle on which young Alfred and Victor Jr. would perform acrobatics.

In 1907 they developed the "finger-stand" of five metal rods each on two bases, upon which Alfred would balance in a handstand, each of his fingers on a separate rod. Later newspaper reviews of the act in the U.S. describe Alfred performing this feat frequently and on occasion with Victor Jr. balancing on Alfred's back at the same time.

But they were most famous for an acrobatic routine that involved the use of a seesaw and was performed by Alfred and Victor Jr. and would be advertised as “The Balasis. The Boys with the Steel Heads”. In 1908 they began to perform as the “World’s Only Head to Head Jugglers”. Alfred would jump from a chair onto the raised end of a seesaw. Victor Jr., standing on the lowered end, would be thrown into the air and would land head first on Alfred's head where they would maintain their balance using just their neck strength. A padded leather helmet worn by Alfred helped to cushion the head-to-head landing and the balance was held for several seconds. During the act they would repeat this feat, with Victor Jr. alternatively landing with his hand or feet onto Alfred's head. This feat would become their signature routine as they performed twice a day, traveling to the next theater each week, appearing in up to 50 theaters a year.

== Europe ==
From 1905 through 1923, the Balasics performed throughout Europe with the "Das Program / Das Organ" variety agency headquartered in Berlin, Germany. They performed on the European equivalent of the American circus and vaudeville circuits. They toured with a group of performers and at times added individuals to their act, performing as the "5 Merkels" and the "8 Merkels". Having had great success in Europe for 6 years, the “5 Merkels” traveled on tour to the United States and Canada in 1911 bringing their unique head-to-head balancing act to North America for 6 months. They toured the west coast of America on the Pantages vaudeville circuit, performing in Seattle, Portland, San Francisco, Sacramento and Los Angeles. They also performed in Calgary and Edmonton in Alberta, Canada, and appeared at the Empire Theater in New York City before returning to Europe in 1912. In something of an adventure, they were on tour in Imperial Russia when World War I broke out in 1914 between Austria-Hungary and Russia.

As Austro-Hungarian citizens, they were interned by the Russian government and transported to Siberia. After several months, they were able to leave Russia by way of Scandinavia and returned home to Berlin. They began performing under a new stage name as the "5 Balasis" for the next several years in areas controlled by the Austro-Hungarian and German Empires during the war. The act stopped performing for a period of time between 1917 and 1918 when Victor Sr., Alfred and Victor Jr. served in the Austro-Hungarian army.

Immediately after the war ended in November 1918, the act was resumed. Between 1918 and 1923, the "5 Balasis" performed all over Europe, including in Germany, Austria, Hungary, the Netherlands, Czechoslovakia, Norway, France, Switzerland and Belgium. During this period, they developed a new theme titled "On the Society Football Grounds". The theme involved their playing the parts of a stadium crowd and costumed as the soccer players they interpreted the game through a series of head-to-head and hand-to-hand balancing stunts, with one of the troupe acting as the ball. In addition, the family performed a large variety of person-to-person balancing and strength moves, wire walking and ladder apparatus, and tumbling stunts. They were attractions at some of the most prestigious theaters in Europe, including the Alhambra in Paris, the Apollo in Vienna, the Cirque Royal in Brussels, the Corso in Zürich, and the Berlin Wintergarten theatre.

During this time, Alfred met Maria Holz, an Austrian solo dance performer who had been a member of the Vienna State Ballet and was performing on the same theater bills as the “5 Balasis”. She would eventually marry Alfred and become part of the act.

In 1923, the Balasics were offered a contract to perform in North America. It was for 30 weeks of work, with the act to be paid four hundred dollars a week for performances in small cities, and four hundred fifty dollars (equal to six thousand five hundred in 2018 dollars) a week in large cities. They accepted, and in August 1923 Victor Sr., Paula, Alfred, Victor Jr., Maria Holz and a Danish girl who was employed as part of the Balasis troupe sailed from Gothenburg, Sweden, to New York City for a North American vaudeville tour.

== North America ==
The "5 Balasis", "The Boys with the Steel Heads", "World's only Head to Head Jugglers", began performing on the B.F. Keith's vaudeville circuit beginning in Chicago in September 1923. The tour then proceeded, in succeeding weeks, with performances in St. Louis, Detroit, Cleveland, Buffalo, Rochester, Toronto, Montreal, Boston, Keith's Palace Theatre in New York City, Newark, Washington, D.C. (on the same top billing at B.F. Keith's Theatre with Jack Benny, December 3, 1923), Norfolk, Richmond, Schenectady, Amsterdam, Albany and Binghamton, New York. That the "5 Balasis" had been booked to perform at the premiere venue in the country, B.F. Keith's Palace Theatre in New York City, was testament to how highly the act was regarded. Mark Henry of the Billboard theatrical trade publication in his November 5, 1923 review of their performance at the Palace Theatre described the act:

The Five Balasis, who opened, having been switched from the closing spot, were a sensation with their acrobatic tricks, the concluding stunt in particular being productive of decided approbation. It is a throw from a teeter-board impact to a head-to-head catch without the hands being used to assist. The writer has never seen this trick performed before!

There followed immediately another U.S. tour on the Orpheum circuit where, during April 1924, they appeared on the same bill in Fort Worth, Texas with vaudeville star comedienne Eva Tanguay and on the same bill in Fort Smith, Arkansas, with Mae West, and received better reviews than either.

Rather than return to Europe, the act signed new contracts and began performing on the Pantages circuit. Alfred and Maria married, and a son, Alfred Balasi, was born in September 1924 in Portland, Oregon. In October, the young Danish woman who had accompanied them from Europe left the act and the “5 Balasis” became the “Balasi Troupe".

After more than thirty years in the business, Victor Sr. and Paula decided to retire in early 1925 and remain in America. Having lived in hotels for the 2 previous years, they selected Chicago as their new home.

The act was reorganized as the "Balasi Trio", starring Alfred, his wife Maria and Victor Jr., and they concentrated on acrobatics with new costumes sporting an American collegiate theme. They debuted their new act in June 1925 on the open air stage of the Palisades Amusement Park in New Jersey. The balasi Trio went on to perform on several vaudeville circuits through early 1927, including the B.F. Keith, Loew's, Pantages and Gus Sun circuits. Again reviews were good with praise for the head-to-head and hand-to-head vaults. The act appeared several times in articles in Billboard, Variety, Vaudeville News and Zit's, among other theatrical trade publications. An article in the July 30, 1926, issue of Vaudeville News recounted how the Balasi Trio employed a movie camera to record their act to help improve their performance.

During 1927, the trio changed their act, with more of their performance devoted to dancing by Maria, but gymnastics by Alfred and Victor were still a major part of the act. Maria, who had used the name Micareme during her solo dance career in Europe, created the stage name of "Florence Micareme and Company" with a Renaissance theme. They toured on the B.F. Keith, Pantages and Proctor circuits through 1929. For 2 years from August 1927 to August 1929, they performed 2 shows a day, traveling by train with all their gymnastic equipment, to over one hundred vaudeville theaters from the east coast to the west coast, frequently playing alongside the stars of the vaudeville stage. Reviews were again good for the men's head-to-head acrobatics and the overall act was usually well received.

The Balasis had their last performance at the New Palace Theater (now the Cadillac Palace Theatre) on September 16, 1929, in Chicago, where they had started their North American vaudeville tour in 1923. Vaudeville was on the decline, being supplanted by the budding movie business. After their final performance, the Florence Micareme and Company act was dissolved, and Alfred and Maria retired in Chicago in 1930.

Victor Jr. left the act to start up his own act with his wife as "Balasi and Skaren". Victor Jr. retired a decade later in New York City as vaudeville began to die out.

He died there in 1943 and is buried in the National Vaudeville Association section of Kensico Cemetery in Valhalla, New York. Victor Sr. had died in 1931, Paula Enders Balasic in 1954, Maria Holz Balasic in 1963 and Alfred Balasic in 1967, all in Chicago, Illinois.

== Alternative names ==
- The Great Merkels 1905–1914
- The 5 Merkels
- The 8 Merkels
- The Great Enders 1915
- The 5 Balasis 1916–1924
- The 6 Balasis
- The Balasi Troupe 1925
- The Balasi Trio 1925–1927
- Florence Micareme and Company 1927–1930
