= George Godfrey =

George Godfrey may refer to:

== People ==
- George Godfrey (boxer, born 1897) (1897–1947), American boxer
- George Godfrey (boxer, born 1853) (1853–1901), Canadian boxer
- George Godfrey (curler), American curler
- George Godfrey (journalist) (1904–1989), Australian journalist and union leader
- George Godfrey (politician) (1834–1920), member of the Victorian Legislative Council (1885–1904) for South Yarra
- George Godfrey (swimmer) (1888–1965), South African swimmer
- George Godfrey (vaudeville) (1886–1974), general manager of the Orpheum Circuit

== Other ==
- George Godfrey (novel), an 1828 novel by Thomas Gaspey

== See also ==
- George Godfrey Massy Wheeler (1873–1915), VC recipient
