= USS Beaumere II =

Patrol vessel of the United States Navy

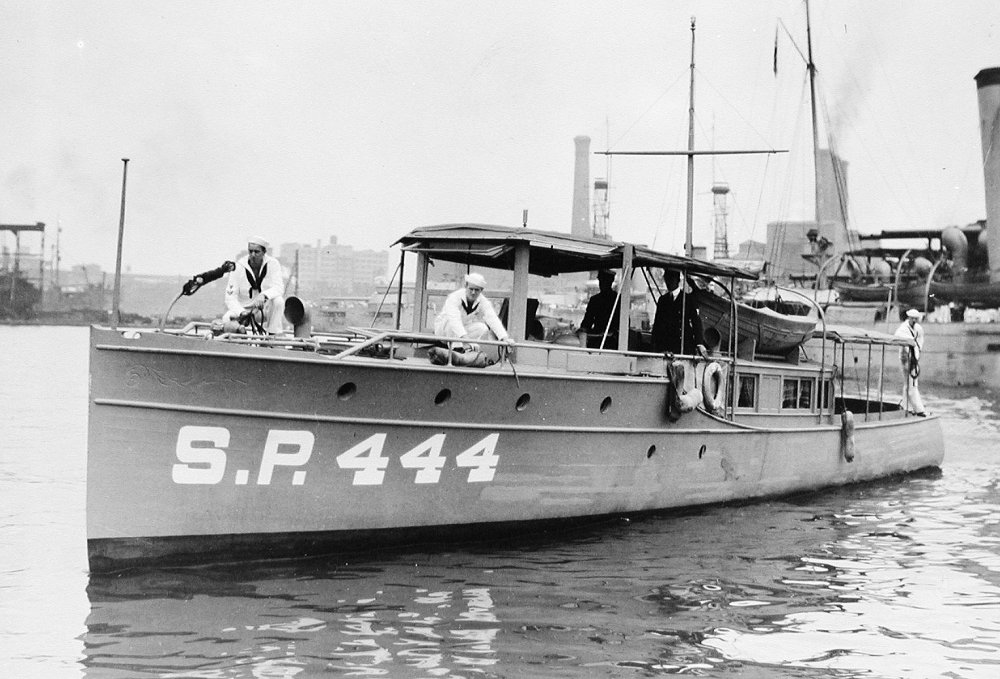
- USS Beaumere II (SP-444) at the Brooklyn Navy Yard on 15 September 1917.

History

United States
- Name: USS Beaumere II
- Namesake: Previous name Beaumere retained with the addition of the Roman numeral II
- Builder: Gas Engine and Power Company and Charles L. Seabury Company, Morris Heights, the Bronx, New York
- Completed: 1914
- Acquired: Leased 29 June 1917; Delivered 18 July 1917
- Commissioned: 22 October 1917
- Decommissioned: February 1919
- Stricken: 24 February 1919
- Fate: Returned to owner 24 February 1919
- Notes: Operated as private yacht Madge II and Beaumere 1914–1917 and Beaumere 1919–1949

General characteristics
- Type: Patrol vessel
- Displacement: 12 tons
- Length: 62 ft 6 in (19.05 m)
- Beam: 10 ft 9 in (3.28 m)
- Draft: 3 ft (0.91 m) mean
- Propulsion: Two gasoline engines, two shafts
- Speed: 22.5 knots
- Complement: 5
- Armament: 1 × 1-pounder gun; 1 × Colt machine gun

USS Beaumere II (SP-444) was a United States Navy patrol vessel in commission from 1917 to 1919.

== Construction and acquisition ==
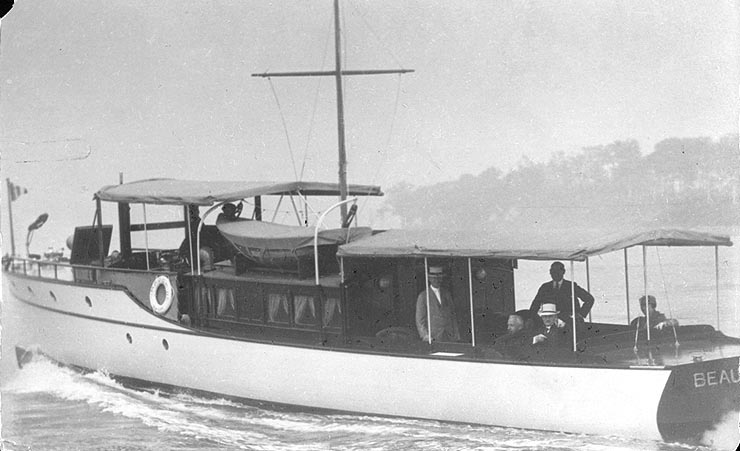
Beaumere II as Edward Franklin Albee II's private motorboat Beaumere prior to World War I. She carries a life ring amidships bearing her earlier name Madge II.

Beaumere II was built as the private motorboat Madge II in 1914 by the Gas Engine and Power Company and the Charles L. Seabury Company at Morris Heights, the Bronx, New York. She later was renamed Beaumere.

On 29 June 1917, the U.S. Navy acquired Beaumere under a free lease from her owner, the vaudeville impresario Edward Franklin Albee II (1857–1930), for use as a section patrol vessel during World War I. The Navy took delivery of her from Albee on 18 July 1917. The Navy added the Roman numeral II to her name and commissioned her as USS Beaumere II (SP-444) on 22 October 1917.

== United States Navy service ==
Assigned to the 3rd Naval District, Beaumere II operated principally from the New York Navy Yard, the Barge Office at Battery Park, and the Marine Basin at Ulmer Park in Brooklyn, New York, as a despatch boat for the rest of World War I and into early 1919. She spent her entire naval career carrying passengers between various locations on the shores of the East River and North River, to Staten Island, and as far north as West Point, New York, on the Hudson River. During portions of April, May, June, and September 1917, and again in January 1919, she alternated with the patrol boat USS Get There (SP-579) as despatch boat at the Barge Office. She interspersed these active operations and stand-by periods with upkeep at the Marine Basin.

Among the naval officers Beaumere II transported numerous times were Rear Admiral Cameron McRae Winslow, Inspector of Naval Districts on the Atlantic Coast, Rear Admiral Nathan R. Usher, Commandant of the 3rd Naval District, and Usher's chief of staff, Captain Louis R. de Steiguer, who was a frequent passenger. Other distinguished passengers included Vice Admiral DeWitt Coffman and his staff, on a trip from the New York Navy Yard out to the French Navy armored cruiser Dupetit-Thouars on 27 June 1918; Major General J. Franklin Bell, United States Army, who was embarked with a small party for an excursion up the Hudson River to West Point on 1 September 1918; Admiral William S. Benson, the Chief of Naval Operations, whom Beaumere II transported to the transport USS Northern Pacific on 17 October 1918; and the Brazilian Ambassador to the United States E. H. DeGama and his wife, whom Beaumere II took out to the armored cruiser USS Pueblo (Armored Cruiser No.7) on 22 October 1918 for the start of DeGama's journey back to Rio de Janeiro.

Perhaps Beaumere II's most eventful trip occurred on 10 July 1918 with Captain DeSteiguer embarked. She was en route the Barge Office at Battery Park when she encountered a heavy swell caused by the passage of an outward-bound battleship. Water entered Beaumere II's engine room through an open port, short-circuiting the port motor. Although hampered by having to proceed on one engine, Beaumere II continued on her way and delivered DeStiguer to the Barge Office safely.

== Disposal ==
Beaumere II's final voyage while in commission was to Pier 72 in New York City on 15 February 1919. After being decommissioned there, Beaumere II was stricken from the Navy Directory on 24 February 1919 and returned to Albee the same day.

== Later career ==
Reverting to her original name, Beaumere, she remained under Albee's ownership through 1929, after which she became the property of the Marine Sales and Service Company, of New York City. Her last owner appears to have been a Joseph White, through 1949, after which time the name Beaumere disappears from contemporary yacht registers.
