= Louise Heims Beck =

American librarian and vaudeville performer (1889–1978)

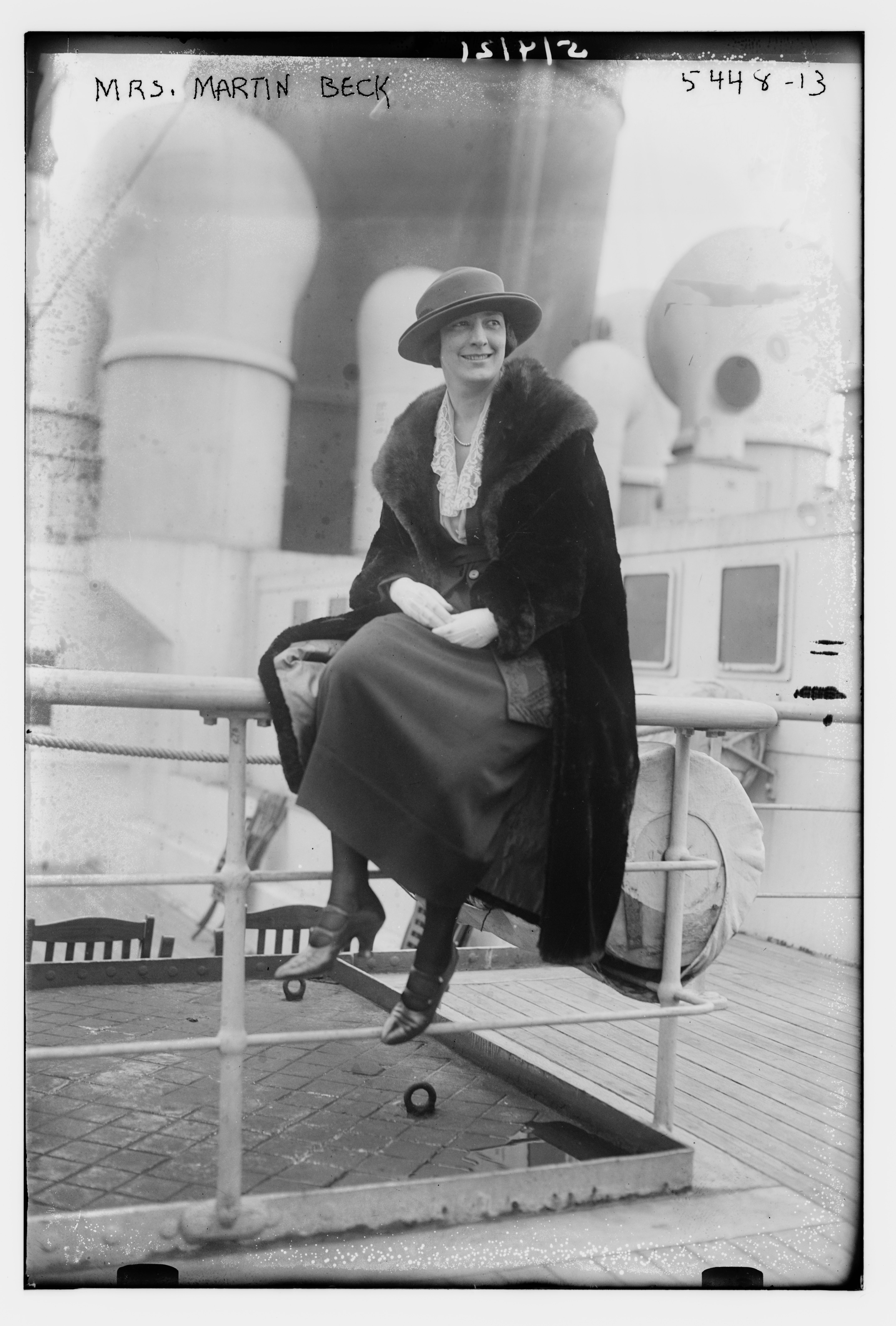
- Born: Louise Payton Heims; February 23, 1889; Osceola Township, Pennsylvania, U.S.
- Died: March 16, 1978 (aged 89); Lenox Hill Hospital, New York City, U.S.
- Other name: Mrs. Martin Beck
- Education: Drexel Institute of Art, Science and Industry
- Occupations: Librarian; vaudeville performer
- Spouse: Martin Beck (m. 1920; died 1940)
- Children: 2
- Relatives: Morris Meyerfeld Jr. (uncle)
- Awards: Special Tony Award (1958); Actors Fund Medal of Honor (1977)

Louise Payton Heims Beck (February 23, 1889 – March 16, 1978), sometimes referred to as Mrs. Martin Beck, was an American librarian who became a vaudeville performer and the wife of theatre impresario Martin Beck. She assisted her husband in his theatrical enterprises until his death in 1940, after which she took over the management of his eponymous Broadway theatre. Along with Antoinette Perry and several other women, she co-founded the American Theater Wing (ATW) in its revived and revised version in 1940. She served as one of the directors of the ATW in its early years, and played a critical role in establishing both the Stage Door Canteen during World War II and the Tony Awards in 1947. She was chairperson of the governing board of the Actors' Fund of America from 1960 until her death in 1978.

== Life and career ==
Born Louise Payton Heims in Osceola, Pennsylvania, she graduated in 1911 from the Drexel Institute of Art, Science and Industry (now Drexel University) with a degree in Library Science. While a student at Drexel she worked as an assistant librarian. In 1911 she became the first librarian at Wake Forest College; a post she held for four years. In 1915 she relocated to New York City and assumed a position as a librarian with the New York Public Library. She left that post after successfully auditioning as a singer for Marcus Loew; who booked her for three performances a day in his vaudeville circuit.

Her uncle was Morris Meyerfeld Jr., a theatre entrepreneur who was the financial backer of the famous Orpheum Circuit. He employed impresario Martin Beck to hire the talent for his theaters. In 1920 she married Beck after meeting him while touring in vaudeville. They had two daughters together. Prior to their marriage, her husband had founded Broadway's Palace Theatre in Times Square in 1912. In 1924 he established a second theatre, the Martin Beck Theatre. Heims Beck became a close partner to her husband in his theatrical endeavors, advising him on productions and reviewing potential scripts for use in his theatres. After his death in 1940, she continued to manage the Martin Beck Theatre with Louis A. Lotito.

In 1940 Heims Beck co-founded the American Theatre Wing (ATW) with Antoinette Perry, the organization responsible for the Tony Awards. Initially the organization was established to raise funds and supplies, such as clothing and medical items, to aid American and British military personnel in need during World War II (WWII). She was one of the ATW's directors from 1940 until 1946 when Perry died; serving as the organization's first Vice President. She played an integral role in the establishment of both the Stage Door Canteen during WWII and the Tony Awards in 1947. She was responsible for overseeing the organization of the 1st Tony Awards. In her role as chairman of the ATW in 1950–1951, she served as one of the main presenters at the 4th and 5th Tony Awards.

In addition to her work with the ATW, Heims Beck was dedicated to the Actors Fund of America; serving first as a trustee of the organization and then chairman of its governing executive committee from 1960 until her death eighteen years later. She concurrently served as the director of the Percy G. Williams Home; a retirement home for impoverished elderly actors. In 1958 she was the recipient of a Special Tony Award for her service to the theatre community. She was also the recipient of an honorary doctorate from Drexel University in 1977. In 1977 she was given the Actors Fund Medal of Honor on the occasion of her 88th birthday.

Louise Heims Beck died at Lenox Hill Hospital in Manhattan on March 16, 1978, at the age of 89.
