= Edward Franklin Albee =

Edward Franklin Albee is the name of:

- Edward Franklin Albee II (1857–1930), vaudeville theatre chain owner, grandfather of playwright Edward Albee
- Edward Franklin Albee III (1928–2016), playwright and grandson of Edward Franklin Albee II
