= Actors Fund Medal of Honor =

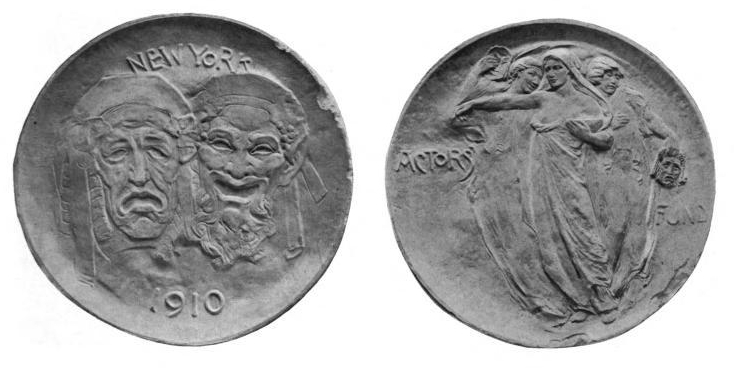
1910 Medal of Honor presented to William Howard Taft, designed by Chester Beach

The Actors Fund Medal of Honor has been awarded since 1910 by the Actors' Fund of America to individuals and organizations that are committed to enriching the entertainment community.

== Honorees ==
- 2008 Stewart F. Lane & Bonnie Comley
- 2007 John Breglio, Esq.
- 2006 Rocco Landesman
- 2005 Roger Berlind
- 2004 Thomas C. Short
- 2003 Martin Richards
- 2002 James M. Nederlander
- 2001 Tom Dillon
- 2000 Related Companies L.P., Philip J. Smith, Kevin Spacey
- 1999 Sir Cameron Mackintosh, Bernadette Peters
- 1998 Gerald Schoenfeld, Arthur Ochs Sulzberger, Jr.
- 1996 Tina Brown, Merle Debuskey, Federic Rosen
- 1995 Sir Andrew Lloyd Webber, J.P. Morgan & Co., Inc.
- 1994 Frank A. Bennack, Jr., Jonathan S. Linen, Robert Whitehead
- 1992 Bernard B. Jacobs
- 1989 Lucille Lortel
- 1987 George Abbott
- 1985 Alexander H. Cohen
- 1983 George Burns, Armina Marshall
- 1982 James M. Nederlander
- 1981 Ronald Reagan
- 1980 Nedda Harrigan Logan
- 1979 Frances McCarthy
- 1978 Bernard B. Jacobs, Gerald Schoenfeld
- 1977 Mrs. Martin Beck, Joseph Papp
- 1976 Louis A. Lotito
- 1975 Ellen Burstyn, Charles Grodin, Robert Preston, Vincent Sardi
- 1974 Jacob I. Goodstein, Debbie Reynolds
- 1973 Clive Barnes, Harry Hershfield
- 1972 Alfred Lunt & Lynn Fontanne, Harold Prince, Neil Simon
- 1971 Danny Kaye, Warren P. Munsell, Richard Rodgers
- 1970 Brooks Atkinson, Katharine Hepburn, Ethel Merman
- 1969 Hon. John V. Lindsay
- 1968 Angela Lansbury
- 1967 Ed Sullivan
- 1966 Warren A. Schenck
- 1964 Angus Duncan, Zero Mostel, Floyd W. Stoker
- 1963 Lawrence Shubert Lawrence, Jr., Newbold Morris
- 1962 American Shakespeare Festival, League of Off-Broadway Theatres
- 1960 Nanette Fabray, Sam Levene, Music Fair Enterprises
- 1959 Ralph Bellamy, Council of Stock Theatres, Stephen P. Kennedy, Mary Martin, Musical Arena Theatre Assn.
- 1958 Actors' Equity Association, Charles Dow Clark, Fact Finding Committee of the Entertainment Unions in New York, Helen Hayes, League of New York Theatres, J.J. Shubert, Walter Vincent
- 1910 William Howard Taft
