= Harold Winston =

Harold Winston may refer to:

- Harold A. Winston (1901–1964), American stage actor and promoter
- Harold W. Winston (1887–1960), performer and a trainer of sea lions
