= Get There =

Get There may refer to:

- Get There (Minor Alps album), 2013
- Get There (Bôa album), 2005
- "Get There", a song performed by the Danish singer Rikke Emma Niebuhr
- USS Get There (SP-579), a United States Navy patrol vessel in commission from 1917 to 1919
