= Grand Opera House (Los Angeles) =

Former theater in Los Angeles, CA

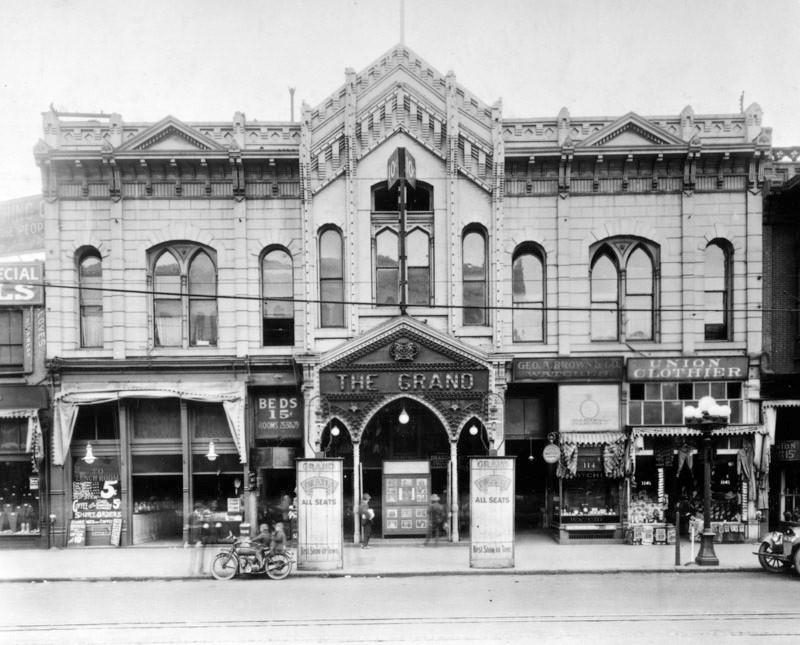
- The building in 1920
- Interactive map of Grand Opera House
- Address: 110 S. Main Street; Los Angeles
- Coordinates: 34.05319°N 118.24573°W
- Capacity: 1311

Construction
- Opened: May 24, 1884
- Renovated: 1887-1888
- Closed: April 5, 1936
- Demolished: 1936
- Architects: Ezra F. Kysor and Octavius Morgan; James M. Wood (1888 remodel)

Grand Opera House, originally Child's Opera House, also known as Grand Theater, Orpheum Theatre, Clune's Grand, and Teatro Mexico, was a theater located in downtown Los Angeles. It was the first home of the Orpheum Circuit in Los Angeles and also the first theater in Los Angeles to exhibit Thomas Edison's motion picture technology.

== History ==
Grand Opera House was built by Ozro W. Childs and opened on May 24, 1884, at which point it became the largest theater in Los Angeles. It was designed by Ezra F. Kysor and Octavius Morgan and had a seating capacity of 1,311. The theater was renovated by James M. Wood in 1887-1888.

In December 1894, the Orpheum Circuit made this theater their first home in Los Angeles, where they would remain until 1903. After the Orpheum Circuit left, the theater struggled to compete with the nearby Burbank Theatre, Hippodrome, and Mason Opera House, and by 1910, this theater had been converted to a moviehouse. By 1920, it was showing second run movies, then Mexican movies and stage shows.

The theater closed on April 5, 1936 and was demolished soon after.

== Architecture and design ==
Grand Opera House featured a Victorian design that combined elements of Classicism, Gothic Revival, and "artistic" decorations that included pointed arched windows and a facade made of stone and wood. Inside, the theater featured a large balcony and side boxes, while the building itself featured gas lighting and a fashionable lobby and lounge.
