= Merton Clivette =

American painter, magician, writer, vaudevillian and entertainer

- Merton Clivette in the Carlinville Daily Oct 1897
- Born: Merton Clive Cook; June 11, 1868; Portage, Wisconsin
- Died: May 8, 1931 (aged 62); New York City, United States
- Known for: Painting, writing, vaudeville performing, magician, silhouettist
- Notable work: Snake Killer; Outriding a Blizzard; Vamps
- Movement: Ashcan realism

Merton Clive Cook (11 June 1868 - 8 May 1931), also known as Merton Clivette, was an American painter, magician, writer, vaudevillian and entertainer who spent most of his early life traveling the world entertaining before settling in New York to paint permanently. As a very highly regarded American artist of the early 20th century by his peers (including Maurice Sterne, Waldo Pierce, Edward Bruce, Marcel Sauvage and Michel Georges-Michel of Paris, among others), his style can be identified with the American expressionist movement. Clivette is also known to be one of several artists who most defined the Ashcan realism period in New York at that time. Clivette was demonstrated artistic talent painting in a free flowing manner rarely painting over a line twice. During the 1920s his style evolved as he moved from realism toward expressionism eventually moving on to figurative and the abstract.

== Life ==
Clivette was born in 1868 in Portage, Wisconsin but grew up in the Wyoming Territory. In this teens he left home to participate in a Wild West show which toured the Northwest US and during his time in it he was able to display his skills as an acrobat, juggler and amateur magician. He honed these skills into what would later be a Vaudeville touring show. Clivette moved to Seattle, then San Francisco in the late 1880s. Clivette was a student of Auguste Rodin from 1889-1890 and even painted a portrait of Auguste Rodin, said to be the greatest of all portraits of the sculptor.

He started his own circus tour in 1890 and then joined the Orpheum Circuit to tour with them from 1891-1900. At this time he officially adopted the name Clivette, and billed himself "Clivette, the Man in Black". He toured Europe in 1893, and Far East in 1894. He married a circus performer Catherine Parker Chamberlain, in New York in 1896, and her acts were incorporated into his show. They toured America, Europe and the East, until 1907 when a daughter, Juanita (also spelled Juanyta) Clivette, was born.

The family of Clivettes moved to New York, where Merton gave up his stage career and began to paint full time. Merton was an active part of the artist community there, participating in symposiums and workshops at the Art Students League, being a member of the Society of Independent Artists, and befriending other artists. The entire family was a part of the vibrant Bohemian life of Greenwich Village in the teens and 20’s. From 1918 to 1923 Merton and Catherine ran an antique store "Bazaar de Junk" on 1 Sheridan Square, telling outlandish stories about their products to the visitors. In 1920 they also announced that their daughter, Juanita, ever since the age of 5 claimed to be a reincarnation of Sappho, with the whole story catching the attention of the press, and Juanita starting to publicly read her poems. Meanwhile her father's work was frequently exhibited during the 1920s from Los Angeles to Paris, and New York in-between. Clivette died in 1931, at the age of 62, in New York, after "a long illness".

== Career ==
Clivette modeled himself with Ashcan School artists (including Robert Henri) utilizing realist subjects. Clivette used the Chiaroscuro style in both light and dark juxtapositions and loose but forceful brushwork. This technique links him and the Ashcan school. These were similar to Robert Henri and other realist painters. Clivette was well known for his Vamp series which portray show-business ladies in Burlesque attires. Contrasting these Vamp paintings Clivette painted numerous Native American portraits. Clivette inevitably moved away from this realistic look to a more distorted fashion in the vein of Chaïm Soutine. Over time he drifted away from realism toward expressionism. His later work turned toward figurativism, and eventually becoming abstract.

Clivette created his expressionist works painting with confidence with many strokes in succession; he utilized his skills he learned as an acrobat to move the brushes with precision. In his grander works, the marks looked like they were created using his whole body. This style was one of his greatest strengths. Over time other New York artists such as Franz Kline, picked up on this new type of performance painting to make their mark. During the 1920s New York art locale, Clivette was respected and his art was well received. George S. Hellman writes that Clivette was the greatest American Painter ever after seeing Clivette's "Outriding the Blizzard" painting. Hellman was so convinced of Clivette's genius that he purchased a number of paintings from him and encouraged other accomplished New York painters — Maurice Sterne, Paul Manship, Edward Bruce — to purchase paintings from Clivette as well. Sterne himself was amazed at this unknown artist who he thought painted self-portraits similarly to Paul Cézanne but with less control.

To this point is a reference from Henry Rankin Poore's book "Modern Art, Why, What and How" which talks about Clivette's impact including this Paris show. He begins, "Although France may claim the credit of introducing modern art to the world it is not generally known that before Paul Cézanne had sponsored cubism and Henri Matisse freedom, an American citizen was working out kindred theories. Merton Clivette, although of distant French extraction, has been Americanized through generations since 1630."

Additionally it notes, "Only recently an invitation came for a large exhibition of his works in Paris, and had those pictures been seen there when first produced, Henri Matisse would have had to acknowledge that his idea had already been preempted. The French Government, through its Director of Fine Arts, selected an example from this exhibition which is destined for Luxembourg. The critical press of Paris extolled the newcomer from across the sea. It is quite proper then that the makers of Modern Art should move up and accord Clivette a place beside them."

Clivette joins six other painters as the only American given a special article in the book, "Selections from the Collection of George S. Hellman", along with Picasso, Cezanne, Matisse, Derain, Gauguin, and Van Gogh. Selected paintings include Rushing Waters, Flowers in a Pot, Still Life, Walt Whitman, Indian in a Canoe, Toucan, Seascape, Small Seascape, and Sunset among others.
