= Rieffenach =

Family of circus performers

Aug. 2, 1931 Chicago Sunday Tribune page of pictures including section on the "Circus is coming to town" with references to performers Rose Rieffenach, bareback equestrian, and Felix Adler, clown, performing with the Ringling Brothers and Barnum & Bailey Combined Circus in Chicago's Grant Park.

The Rieffenach family were circus performers who specialized in a bareback riding act that performed in Europe and the United States during the first half of the 20th century. Family members, daughters Maria (Mitzi) Rieffenach and Rose (Rosie) Rieffenach, were inducted into the Circus Hall of Fame in 1970. The Rieffenach Family Equestrian Act originated from the marriage of the mother Maria Enders of the Hungarian Circus Enders, and Simon Rieffenach Sr. The family performed their horseback riding act with the Sarrasani Circus in Europe from 1905 and were with the German Circus Carl Hagenbeck in 1921. The Rieffenach Family Riding Act came to the United States in 1922 after being booked to perform for the Ringling Bros. and Barnum & Bailey Circus. The Rieffenach Family Act was with Ringling Brothers for sixteen years through 1937. In her memoir, Tiny Kline, the famous circus acrobat, stated: "The Rieffenachs' riding act had been the feature in the center ring of the Big Show since their arrival from Austria". In 1939 the Rieffenachs went on the Cole Bros. Circus, performing through 1942 after which time the act was disbanded. One son, James Rieffenach, continued riding with the Poodles Hanneford Act, while the other members of the act retired. James died of a heart attack in 1945 while still performing with the Cole Bros. Circus.

== Members ==
The members of the act included the matriarch, Maria Enders Rieffenach, and her daughters, Mitzi Rieffenach Jahn, Rose Rieffenach Bruce, Betty Rieffenach Olvera and Maria's son, James Rieffenach. In an interview for the magazine Circus Scrap Book published in 1932, the late famous circus aerialist, Lillian Leitzel, spoke of the Rieffenach family as an example of the wholesome conditions of circus life, demonstrated by the parents desire to see their children continue in the family circus performer tradition. In addition to the Rieffenach family members, the act included Clarence Bruce, husband of Rose. In an ironic twist of fate, after Lietzel's death in a circus accident in 1931, her widowed husband, the trapeze artist Alfredo Codona married Vera Bruce, also a trapeze artist and the sister of Rose's husband Clarence. In 1937, in an unwholesome act, Codona committed suicide after murdering Vera Bruce.

The Rieffenach act was the continuation of a long established family affair with the circus beginning in Europe. An equestrian herself, the mother Maria had performed bareback riding in Europe with her sister, Paula Enders Balasic, with the Circus Enders owned by their father, Josef Enders. Maria joined the Rieffenach Act and after the Circus Enders closed in 1905 the act joined the Sarrasani Circus. Her sister Paula had left the Circus Enders earlier to form the Balasis family acrobatic act with her husband Victor Balasic Sr. Once in the United States, the mother Maria owned and managed the Rieffenach act but did not ride in the performances.

== Act ==
The Rieffenach act consisted of athletic riding performances on the back of horses, with act members usually standing on the bare back of a horse or sometimes employing a small platform strapped to the horse's back. The performers would execute acrobatic feats in the center ring of the circus tent, riding in circles around the ring, in front of the audience in the stands. There were many elements to the act including one rider standing on the shoulders of another, riding on two horses with one foot on each horse, riding balanced on only one foot, jumping from one horse to another, and even somersaulting from one horse to another. At times the entire family performed at once with three riders standing astride four horses, supporting two more family members on their shoulders. The most famous part of the act was the performance of Maria (Mitzi) Rieffenach and Rose (Rosie) Rieffenach called "riding two-high". Mitzi and Rosie would stand on the horse and then, while the horse galloped around the ring, Mitzi would lift her sister Rosie with one arm up into the air. The scene is recreated on one of their more famous lithographic posters for the Ringling Bros. and Barnum & Bailey Circus including the title "The Rieffenach Sisters, Riding Beauties of International Fame".

In addition to the many circus art posters created for The Rieffenach Sisters, they were the subjects for a painting by the famous artist John Steuart Curry and a print by the famous illustrator and lithographer, Robert Riggs.

== Alternative names ==
- Geschwister Rieffenach Akrobatinnen zu Pferde
- The Rieffenach Troupe
- The Rieffenach Sisters Riding Beauties of International Fame
- Miss Rose Rieffenach Hungarian Queen of Equestrianism
- Rose Rieffenach Champion Equestrienne of Continental Europe
- Miss Rose Rieffenach World's Greatest Equestrienne

[1]
[2]
[3]
[4]
[5]
[6]

== See also ==
- Circus Hall of Fame
