= La Valera =

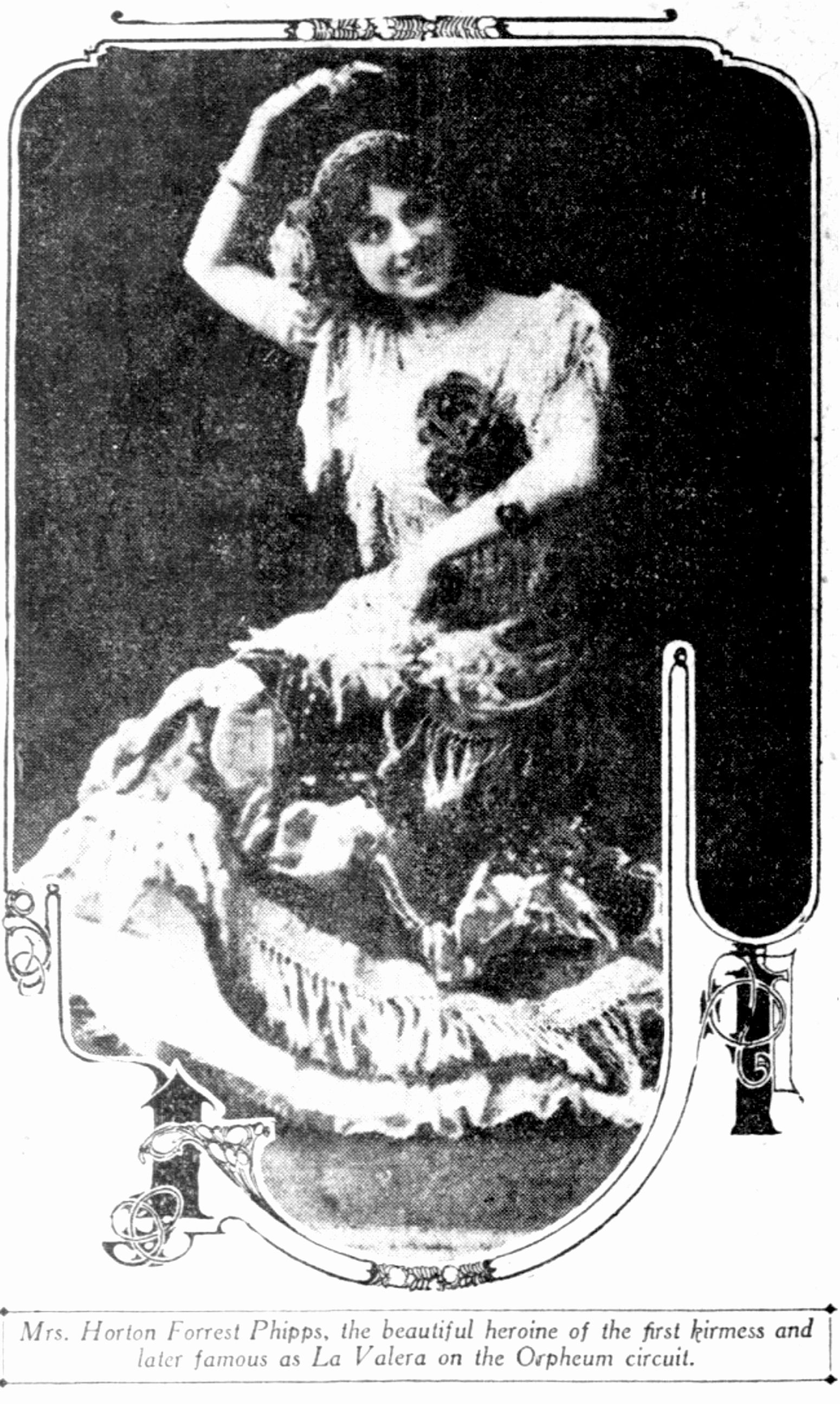
La Valera in 1911

La Valera (died 1973) was a Spanish dancer of the early twentieth century.

== Background ==
When she toured with her "Spanish Dance" her publicity claimed she was a famous Spanish dancer and singer who at the age of 15 was the premier danseuse at the Teatro Real in Madrid. More credible accounts indicate she was born Hazel Wolf to a traveling salesman and his wife and claimed Portland as her home town. Accounts of her divorce give her married name as Mrs. Hazel Gertrude Phipps, daughter of Mrs. Marie Dowd. Phipps married her when she was a student at St. Margaret's, San Mateo. She reportedly "returned" to Spain as a teenager.

== Exotic Dancer ==
She relocated to San Francisco and by 1909 had signed to tour on the Orpheum Circuit, Inc. In a Los Angeles engagement La Valera presented a Kirmess dance during a production of Cupid At Home, at the Orpheum Theater.

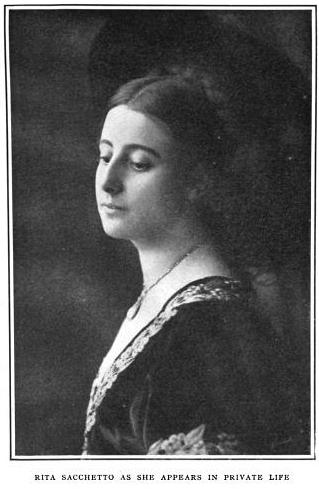
Rita Sacchetto 1910

Often she imitated Rita Sacchetto, a German-born Spanish dancer. Some of the dances she performed were originated by Carmencita. Others were taken from peasant dances. As Rita, La Valera performed a toreador dance, draped in a large black cape. She depicted the fear of the bullfight and the danger faced by the torero precisely. Her attire was black and gold like the jewelry of Toledo, Spain. She designed all of her own costumes.

She performed at the American Music Hall in New York City in May 1910. In 1914 she appeared at the Colonial Theater owned by Benjamin Franklin Keith. In this New York show she was paired with Melvin Stokes in A Dash of Spanish. Will Rogers, the Oklahoma cowboy, was also on the bill.

In June 1915 La Valera joined the Mission Play performers who gave presentations at the Pasadena Playhouse. In September of the same year she introduced a new dance called the El Pandoro at San Gabriel, California. She learned it from La Belle Ortega, a legendary Spanish dancer who was retired.

== Marriage ==
La Valera's husband, Horton Forrest Phipps, became a taxi driver shortly before she began her vaudeville touring. He was soon arrested on a charge of grand larceny, but was acquitted. La Valera divorced him afterwards. Phipps' checkered career was further tarnished by his employment as a runner by a firm of police court attorneys. Through his employment he violated a San Francisco statute which read, "every person who acts as a runner or capper for attorneys in or about police courts is a vagrant and is punishable by a fine of $500 and imprisonment not to exceed six months."

In 1919 she married Army Colonel Hugh Cochran. "La Valera" retired around this time. Being an Army couple, they lived in many places: The Philippines, Hawaii, New York, Virginia, Texas and eventually California.

They had four children: Hazel, Nancy, Hugh and Donald.

The Cochrans settled in Palo Alto, California and later in nearby Atherton, California.

Colonel Hugh Cochran died c. 1963 and Mrs. Hazel Cochran died in 1973.

== Sources ==
- "The Drama-Players, Playhouses, Theatrical Chit-Chat", (May 30, 1909), Los Angeles Times, Page III1.
- "Personifies Spanish dance mood", (June 7, 1915), Los Angeles Times, Page III4.
- "Mission Play", (September 7, 1915), Los Angeles Times, Page II6.
- "Spanish Dancing", (May 1, 1910), New York Times, Page XX3.
- "Week's Bills At The Theatres", (May 24, 1910), New York Times, Page 9.
- "For Vaudeville's Patrons", (January 11, 1914), New York Times, Page X6.
- "The Knave", (December 6, 1914), Oakland Tribune, Page 25.
- "Is It Press Agent Work", (November 11, 1911), Oakland Tribune, Page 9.
- "Mrs. Phipps (La Valera) Plans Suit for Divorce", (January 19, 1912), Oakland Tribune, Page 13.
