= Harold W. Winston =

Harold W. Winston (September 2, 1887-May 12, 1960) was born in Grand Rapids, North Dakota, US. He is known as a performer and a trainer of sea lions in vaudeville shows, circus's, and in movies.

== Professional life ==
In 1909 he toured Australia with an act called: Captain Winston's Seals. The journal, Vaudeville News, November 12, 1920, states that: "H.W. Winston, of Winston's Water Lions and Diving Nymphs, rushed in Friday, night, paid a year's dues in advance and asked that his new card be sent to the S.S. “Celtic.” As he was sailing next day for England for a tour of the Moss & Stoll houses." Moss & Stoll is also known as Moss Empires.

In his book "The London Palladium: The Story of the Theatre and Its Stars", Chris Woodward gives a glimpse of what that tour was like: “Winston's Water Lions and Diving Nymphs appeared on 24 January 1921, to delight audiences with ‘The Aquatic Marvels of the Twentieth Century’. ‘During their performance the Water Lions will emulate all the feats performed by the Misses Farry and Wood, Gold Medalists of the swimming and diving world.’ Even a high dive of twenty-five feet was successfully attempted.

His trained seal lions appeared in movies such as "Spawn of the North" and "Fisherman's Wharf" in the 1930s and 1940s.

== Personal life ==
While traveling in Europe he met and married his wife Daisy. They had three children: Jacqueline, Joyce and Peter.

He died on May 12, 1960, in Riverside, California, US.
