= Reed A. Albee =

American businessman (1885–1961)

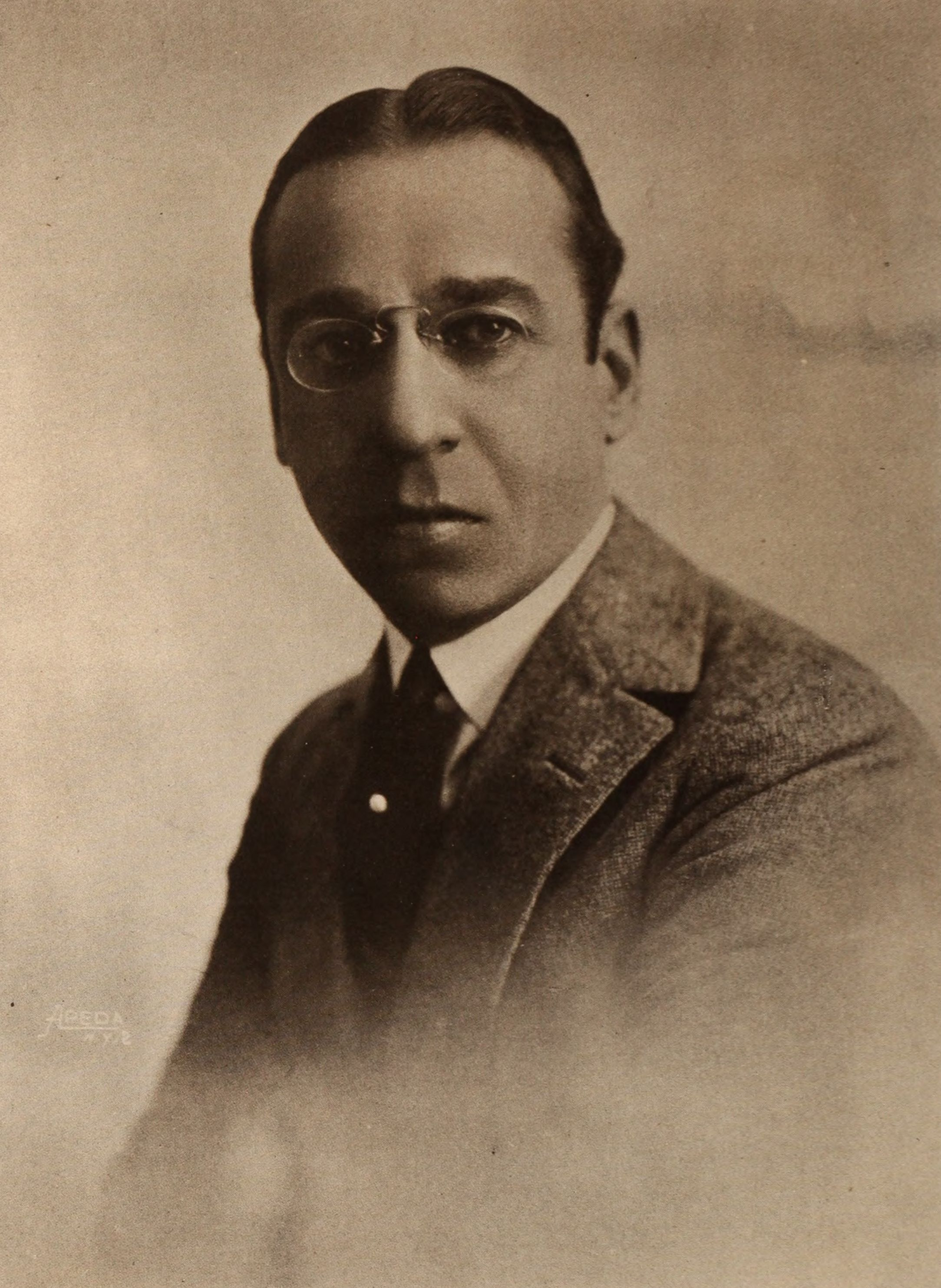

Reed Adalbert Albee (8 September 1885 – 2 August 1961) was an American businessman. He was the adoptive father of the playwright Edward Albee and a member of a prominent East Coast family who owned several theaters.

== Biography ==
Albee was born on 8 September 1885 in Boston, Massachusetts, the son of Laurette Frances Albee (née Smith) and Edward Franklin Albee II. He had a younger sister, Ethel, who was born in 1890.

Albee married Louise Holmes Williams, an actress, on 10 June 1914. They were divorced on 26 February 1925.

On 7 March 1925, Albee married Frances Cotter in Jersey City, New Jersey. She worked at Jay Thorpe, Inc. at 24 West Fifty-seventh Street in Manhattan. They moved to Larchmont, New York and adopted a son, whom they named Edward Franklin Albee III (1928–2016).

Albee died in Larchmont on August 2, 1961.

== See also ==
- 1900 US Census with Albees in Manhattan
