= Orpheum Circuit =

Former chain of vaudeville and movie theaters

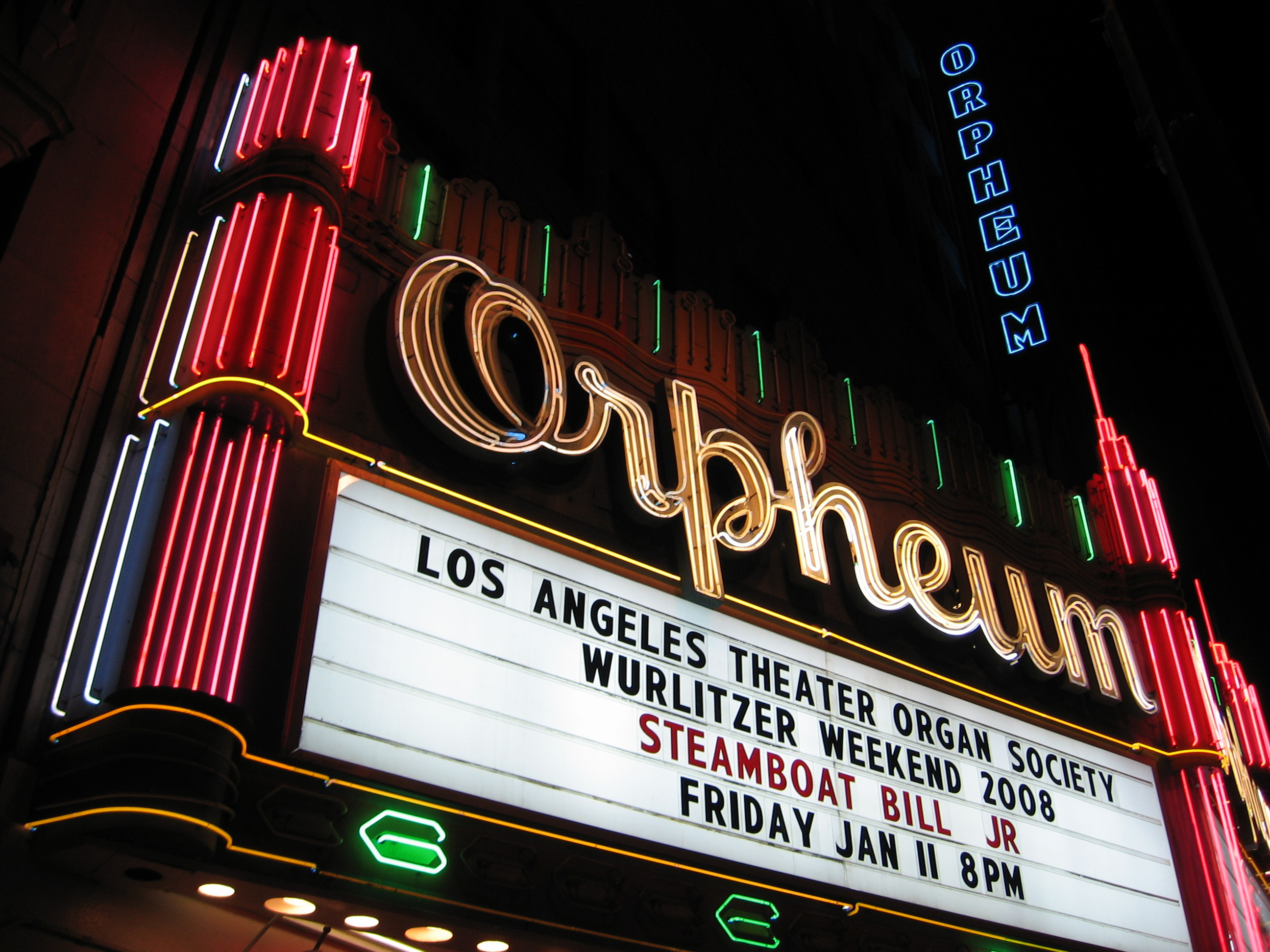
- The Orpheum Theatre in Los Angeles
- Founded: 1886; 140 years ago, in the United States
- Headquarters: United States

The Orpheum Circuit was a chain of vaudeville and movie theaters. It was founded in 1886, and operated through 1927 when it was merged into the Keith-Albee-Orpheum corporation, ultimately becoming part of the Radio-Keith-Orpheum (RKO) corporation.

== History ==
=== Early history (1886–1893) ===
The Orpheum Circuit was started by the vaudeville impresario Gustav Walter, who opened the Orpheum Opera House in San Francisco in June 1887. This first Orpheum seated 3500 and quickly became one of the most popular theaters in San Francisco attracting a wide variety of people.

The Orpheum's tickets were scaled to draw a mixed audience. Customers bought tickets to the Orpheum because of its diverse program that ranged from knockabout comedy to opera. It drew a late-night crowd since it was the only theater open late with performances lasting until two in the morning. The Orpheum's shows were advertised to appeal to "elite audiences" and were "suitable for refined young ladies". One reporter noted that upon seeing a show at the Orpheum, he saw just as many female attendees as male.

Walter was successful but in debt, and in 1891, he faced bankruptcy and leased his theater and its management to John Cort. Cort took over the operations of the Orpheum for two years until his own bankruptcy led to Walter being rehired as manager. This time, Walter had the financial backing of Morris Meyerfeld. Meyerfeld became Walter's business partner, investing $50,000 as his share. As co-owner, Meyerfeld managed the business and financial aspects of the Orpheum while Walter managed the talent and booking for the theater. As partners, they re-opened the theater in 1893 and made the Orpheum the place to go for a night on the town. It was regularly sold out, including standing room.

=== The circuit's beginnings (1893–1900) ===
Following their success in San Francisco, Meyerfeld encouraged Walter to open more theaters. Meyerfeld argued that in order to entice more performers to make the journey to perform at their theater, they needed to make the trip worthwhile. San Francisco was so far removed geographically from the rest of the nation that continuing to attract quality acts was difficult and expensive. By offering more opportunities to perform, Meyerfeld persuaded Walter that they would entice more performers to come to their theater from the east coast and Europe. The next logical city to Meyerfeld was Los Angeles. The pair leased the Grand Opera House and opened the Los Angeles Orpheum to a sold out house in 1894. It was now customary for performers to stop in Los Angeles after playing in San Francisco.

Walter and Meyerfeld continued to expand their operations by opening more theaters on the road between the Midwestern United States and their Pacific Coast theaters. Kansas City, Missouri was chosen as their next location, due to its railroad connections and thriving economy. The pair leased the Ninth Street Theatre and renamed it the Orpheum. It opened in 1898 to a sold out house. Three months after the Kansas City opening, Walter died due to an appendicitis attack. Business for the theaters continued as usual and all contracts held. Meyerfeld was elected as the circuit's new president.

In 1899, Meyerfeld persuaded Martin Lehman, owner of the Los Angeles theater, to officially fold his theater into the Orpheum's operation and join him in a partnership. With Lehman as a partner, the two continued to expand the Orpheum Circuit throughout the Midwest. They leased the Creighton Theater in Omaha, Nebraska and built the Denver Orpheum at a cost of $350,000. With these five theaters, Meyerfeld now ran the "Great Orpheum Circuit".

=== Vaudeville associations and alliances (1900–1907) ===
To continue expanding the Orpheum Circuit's operation, Meyerfeld made a deal with the Western Circuit of Vaudeville Theaters (WCVT), an association of theater owners based in Chicago. Lehman proceeded to Chicago and established an office there for booking acts into their Orpheum theaters. It was at this point that the pair hired Martin Beck to run the booking operations of the theaters. Beck's goals became to "make the Orpheum circuit bring the highest forms of art within reach of the people with the slimmest purses". This alliance now allowed vaudevillians twenty to forty weeks of performing from Chicago to the Pacific Coast.

In 1900, the circuit was incorporated in order to better finance and organize its five theaters. The Orpheum theaters now dominated the big-time circuit west of Chicago. In May 1901, Meyerfeld and Beck, along with other big-time Vaudeville theater owners such as Benjamin Franklin Keith and Edward Franklin Albee II who dominated the Eastern Vaudeville Circuit, met to discuss uniting vaudeville theaters nationwide. On May 29, the bylaws and constitution of the Vaudeville Managers Association (VMA) was signed. This organization was created to eliminate harmful competition.

The creation of the VMA centralized the vaudeville empire. Performers were organized and toured along a prearranged route. For the first time, Eastern and Western Circuits were linked in an agreement. The VMA divided the country into two wings — the Western Vaudeville Managers Association (WVMA) and the Eastern Vaudeville Managers Association (EVMA). The Orpheum-WCVT officials were on the western board, including Meyerfeld and Beck. Members of the board would meet weekly to judge performers and book them into houses as well as establishing salaries. All five Orpheum theaters were now a part of VMA.

Between 1901 and 1905, the Orpheum had doubled in the size of its holdings to eight theaters with new venues now in New Orleans (1902) and Minneapolis (1904). In 1904, the WCVT was replaced completely by the WVMA with Meyerfeld as the president and Beck as vice president of this new association. Managers of the Eastern and western wings of the VMA often bickered over issues and goals of their enterprise and so by the end of 1904, the alliance split into two separate booking circuits-the WVMA and EVMA. By 1906 the WVMA included more than 60 theaters.

In 1906, negotiations began to create another alliance between Keith's eastern theaters and the WVMA. These meetings were interrupted on April 18, 1906 when a devastating earthquake and fire hit San Francisco and destroyed the Orpheum theater. This disaster caused negotiations between the east and west to temporarily cease. A new Orpheum theater was built and opened in January 1907. In May, negotiations for the new east-west alliance continued until finally, mid-June 1907, an agreement was reached and the Combine in trade was formed.

The agreement essentially carved up the country into two sections, drawing a line through Cincinnati. The Orpheum Circuit and its leaders were in control of the territory west of the line to the Pacific Coast. They also had control of much of the south from Louisville to New Orleans as well as western Canada. This new arrangement guaranteed the owners territorial rights and prohibited owners from establishing a theater in a city where another member operated a venue. This new arrangement created an oligopoly that now dominated the big time booking business. This powerful alliance had the power to not only blacklist performers, but now to blacklist any other manager that was not a part of its agreement.

=== Tension between east and west (1907–1919) ===
As vaudeville continued in its popularity, so did the Orpheum Circuit. By the end of 1909, Orpheum theaters had opened in Atlanta, Memphis, Mobile, Birmingham, Salt Lake, Ogden, and Logan. In addition, Beck and Meyerfeld made an agreement with the smaller Sullivan-Considine vaudeville chain in 1908 that allowed the Orpheum to book artists in their theaters in Seattle, Spokane, Portland, and Butte. In 1911–1912, the Orpheum acquired theaters in Winnipeg, Calgary, and Edmonton, Canada.

Beck wanted to continue to build the Orpheum's influence and power. He became obsessed with opening a large Orpheum theater in New York and started to put plans in place to build the Palace right up the street from the Victoria owned by Albee. In addition, Beck decided he wanted to build a new circuit of Orpheum theaters in the east, all of which violated the territorial agreement of the Combine.

As early as 1908, rumors of Beck's intention to put Orpheum theaters on the east coast were printed and tensions rose between the eastern and western managers. Each side of the circuit pushed to increase their territories and in 1910, the eastern managers purchased controlling interest in Cincinnati, Louisville, and Indianapolis. At the end of 1911, Beck officially obtained a multi-year lease on a large piece of property in Times Square, New York where construction for the Palace Theater began in February 1912. Even though each side denied it, the east-west alliance teetered on the brink of collapse.

Additional competition between the two occurred when Percy Williams announced the sale of his eight theaters in 1911. In 1912, an agreement was reached for both circuits to buy the Williams six theaters with the Keith-Albee circuit owning 44 percent and the Orpheum circuit owning an estimated 25 to 43 percent. With this purchase, the Orpheum Circuit now had interests in New York and its surrounding areas and a new territorial agreement was made.

Albee used the new Combine agreement to gain control of the Orpheum's Palace Theater which opened under Beck and the Orpheum's control in 1913. He threatened to take legal action against Meyerfeld and Beck claiming that their ownership of the Palace was a violation of their new territorial agreement. Meyerfeld realized that the partnership with Albee was more important than the Palace and agreed to sell his financial stake. With this transaction the Keith-Albee circuit was now in control of 51 percent of the Palace's stock. Beck maintained his 25 percent interest and consented to be the chief booker for the theater.

=== Late circuit (1919–1928) ===
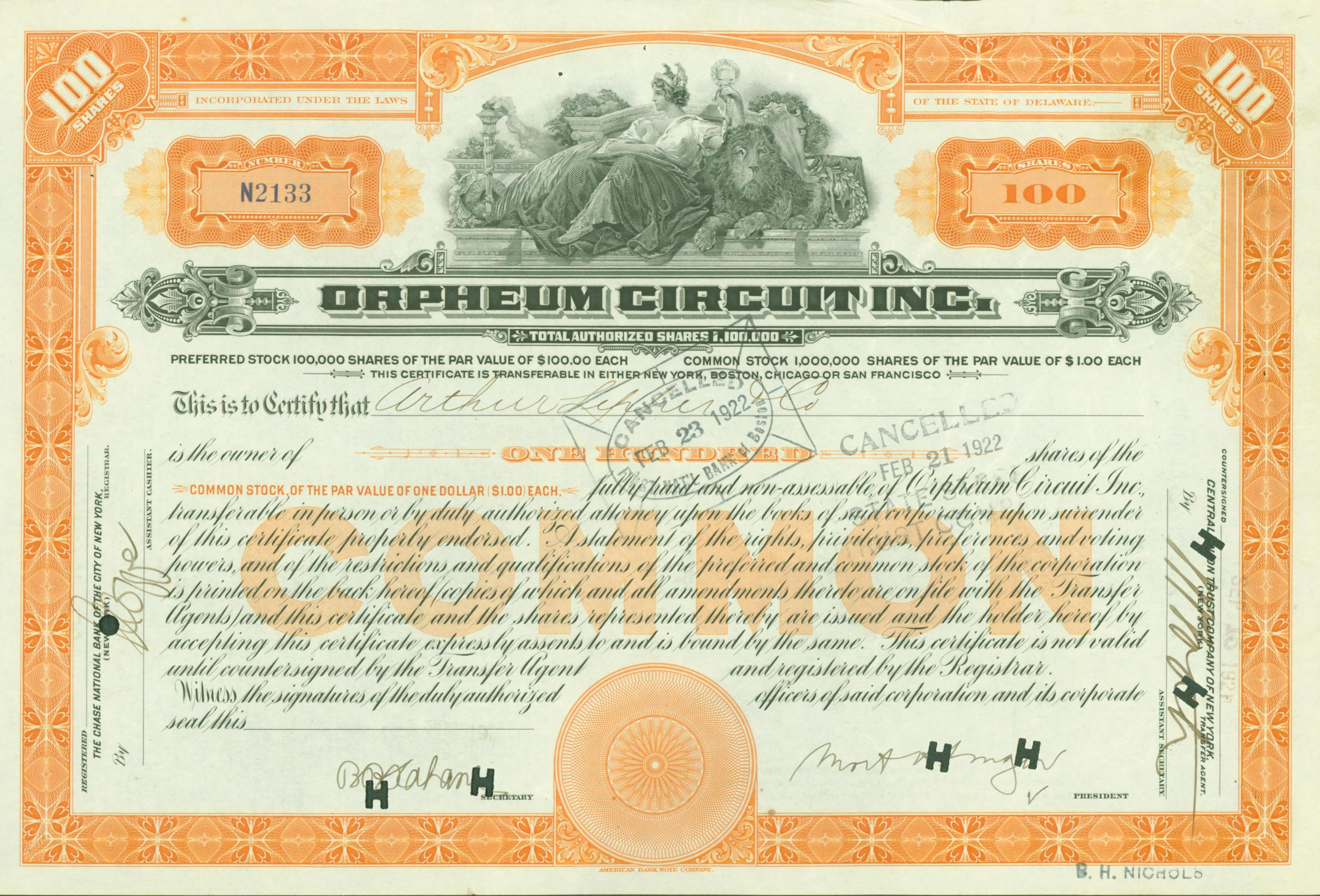
Share of the Orpheum Circuit Inc., issued 16 September 1921

In 1919, twenty-seven small-time Vaudeville theaters located in middle-sized cities in the Midwest joined the Orpheum Circuit. These theaters were operated by Marcus Heiman and Joseph Finn. Meyerfeld retired as the Orpheum's president in 1920 and Beck was appointed as the new president with Heimanas appointed as the new vice president. The circuit now included forty-five vaudeville theaters in thirty-six cities. Heiman and Beck continuously differed in their opinions over questions of theater building and programing. Beck preferred the big-time traditional model of live vaudeville acts while Heiman wanted smaller theaters that favored the new trend of a vaude-film combination.

Beck eventually resigned from the Orpheum in 1923 to become involved with a theater in New York. After his departure Heiman was elected president. Heiman realized that movies were capturing a larger audience and began to give more priority and top billing to featured films rather than live acts in the Orpheum theaters. It cost him less money to rent the feature films and they gave him the opportunity to cut the seven to fifteen act bill to an average of five acts which also saved money. But the Orpheum found it difficult to obtain first-run films since it was not allied with a major motion picture studio.

By 1927, the circuit's box office revenue fell and profits stagnated due to competition from movie palaces and production houses. In the east, the Keith-Albee circuit was having the same issues. These similar problems spurred discussions between the two regarding a merger. It was clear that a merger of the circuits would bolster their financial footing and allow them to continue to compete in the changing entertainment industry. In December 1927 an agreement was reached to merge the two circuits into the Keith-Albee-Orpheum circuit (KAO) which was officially incorporated on June 28, 1928.

In 1928, KAO was merged with Joseph P. Kennedy's Film Booking Offices of America (FBO) film company under the aegis of RCA. The result was Radio-Keith-Orpheum (RKO) which consisted of the former KAO theater chain and a new film studio, Radio Pictures (later called RKO-Radio), one of the major Hollywood studios of the 1930s and 1940s.

== Threats ==
The smaller Pantages theater circuit owned and operated by Alexander Pantages, was a competitor of the Orpheum Circuit. Pantages owned theaters in almost every city where the Orpheum had venues and offered quality entertainment for low-admission. To prevent Pantages from signing their performers, the Orpheum resorted to the blacklist.

During the years of the VMA, performers were encouraged to book through the association and pay a commission fee. The VMA threatened to blacklist artists who did not use their services. The White Rats organization was formed to fight the VMA and protect performers rights. VMA members, including the Orpheum, viewed this growing organization as a threat and would blacklist any performer who joined the rats.

To retaliate, the White Rats initiated a series of strikes and walk-outs in 1901. On March 6, 1901 the VMA managers and White Rats leaders met to discuss deal. The managers agreed to rescind their commission fee for the performers. However, this never happened. The VMA never abolished their commission and as a result the White Rats lost many of their members and became less powerful.

== Booking ==
The booking offices of the Orpheum were constantly busy. The halls and elevators would be crowded all day with Vaudeville performers seeking audiences with booking powers. In other rooms booking agents tried to sell the acts they represented. Bookers tried to arrange fast paced playbills showcasing acts which would dovetail together to create a harmonious show. Successful programs delivered diversity and Orpheum managers avoided similar types of acts on the same playbill. The entire show was packaged to achieve maximum efficiency and momentum from the top of the show to the final curtain. Booking agents tried to engage an act at a theater only once a season.

== Program ==
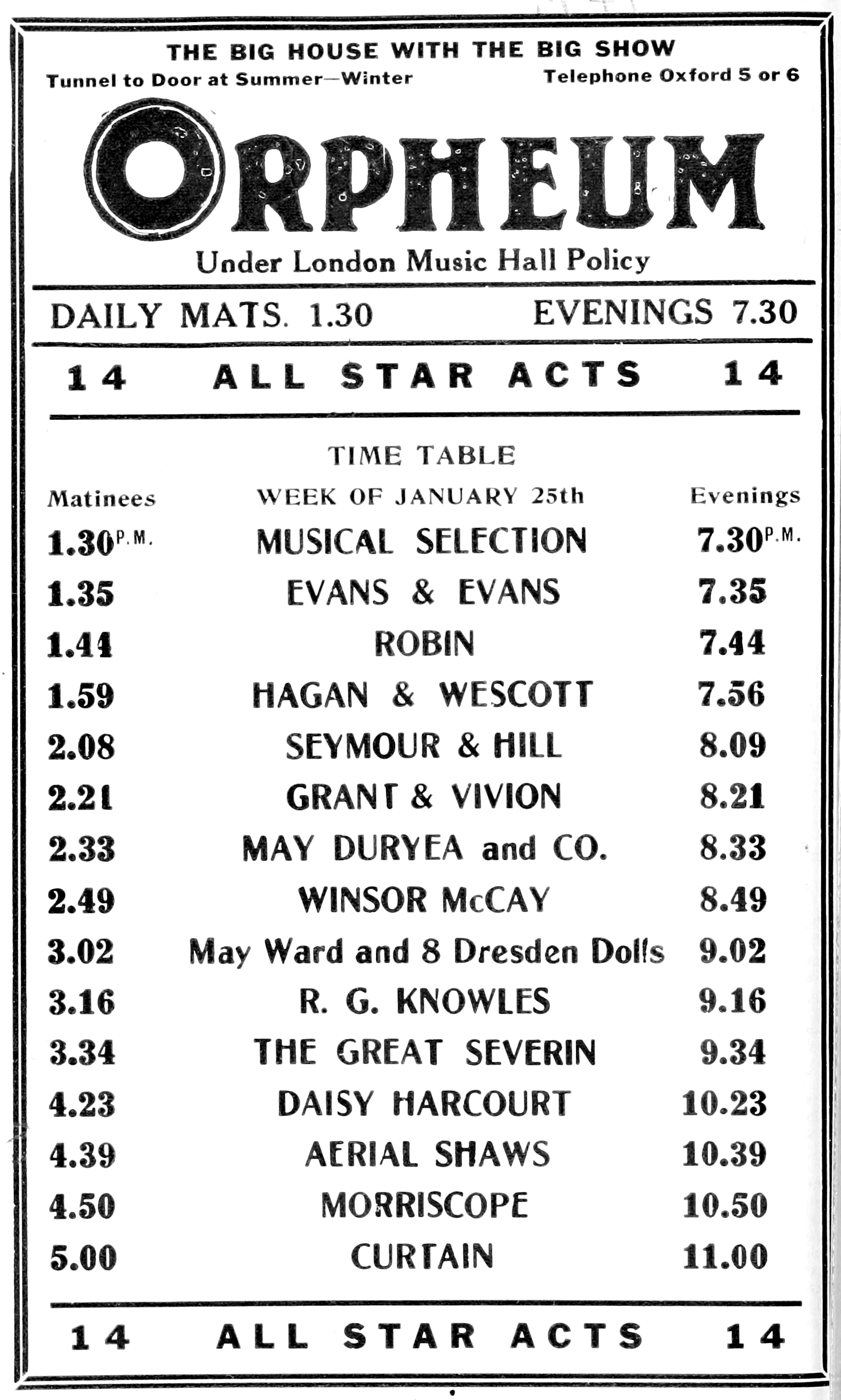
This ad is in This Week in Boston, 1909.

Programs offered at the Orpheum theaters varied in length from around seven to fifteen acts with a nine act bill being the average. The show would open with a "dumb (silent) act" to allow for late arrivals. These acts were typically acrobats, jugglers, dancers, or animal acts. The second slot was meant to grab the audience's attention and arouse expectations. These acts were often a talented singing team or repartee. The third spot was sure-fire entertainment such as a humorous playlet or fast paced revue featuring singing or dancing spectacle.

The fourth position was a comedian or singer who were audience favorites. These performers excited audiences even more. The fifth spot was designed to climax and end the first half of the program with a bang. It needed to be a big sensation with a proven ability to enthrall the audience before intermission. After intermission the sixth act was selected to recapture the audience's attention. It was often an amusing speaker, lively musician, or another "dumb" routine.

Seventh in the line-up was a fully staged production number, designed to excite the audience without over-shadowing the following act. The eighth position was the headliner; the star position. The entire playbill was built around the star and was designed to “wow" the audience and send them home happy. The final act of the night was another "dumb" act such as a trapeze artist or a silent picture.

== Manager and performer relations ==
Beginning with the re-opening of the San Francisco Orpheum in 1893, the Orpheum theaters hosted numerous topflight entertainers, variety combinations, opera companies, and orchestral ensembles from across the United States and Europe. During the early stages of the circuit, Walter would travel to find the best talent making the Orpheum's playbills among the most electric in the nation. After an act played a theater, the manager of that theater would send a report to the booking department. The report would include criticism of the act and measured the audience's response. These reports served as a guide to further booking efforts. Performers careers and futures in the business depended on these reports. The performers often complained that the reports were unfair.

Managers also reported on the artist's behavior such as drinking, gambling, and cursing as well as any offensive material that was eliminated from their routines during rehearsal. Contracts with artists often included a cancelation clause which allowed managers the power to dismiss an act if the artists did not perform to the manager's satisfaction. The manager's power was absolute and vaudevillians lacked job protection. At the rehearsals prior to the show, theater managers were instructed to scrutinize the artist's attire and routines. Anything found to be offensive was asked to be changed or removed. The Orpheum managers went to extreme lengths to not offend their audiences and risk their reputation for wholesome entertainment. As a result, acts were often censored.

== Artists ==
- Borromeo Lou
- Anna Chandler
- George M. Cohan
- Merton Clivette
- Lew Dockstader
- W. C. Fields
- Irene Franklin
- Thomas Kurton Heath
- Harry Houdini
- Gypsy Rose Lee
- James McIntyre
- Bill "Bojangles" Robinson
- La Valera
- George Walker
- Bert Williams
- Gus Williams
- Mack Sennett
- Bothwell Browne
- Sarah Bernhardt

== Management ==
- Martin Beck
- John Cort
- George A. Godfrey
- Morris Meyerfeld
- Gustav Walter

== Theatres still operating ==
- The Orpheum Theatre in Vancouver, British Columbia (1927)
- The Palace Theatre (originally the Orpheum Theatre), 630 S. Broadway, Los Angeles, California (1911)
- The Palace Theatre, New York City (1913)
- The Orpheum Theatre, 842 S. Broadway, 4th and final venue in Los Angeles, California (1926)
- The Orpheum Theatre, Madison, Wisconsin (1926)
- The Orpheum Theater, Omaha, Nebraska (1927)
- The Orpheum Theatre, Galesburg, Illinois (1916)
- The Orpheum Theatre, San Francisco, California (1926)
- The Orpheum Theatre, Memphis, Tennessee (1928)
- The Orpheum Theater, New Orleans, Louisiana (1918)
- The Orpheum Theater, Boston, Massachusetts (1906)
- The Orpheum Theater, Flagstaff, Arizona (1911)
- The Orpheum Theater, Phoenix, Arizona (1929)
- The Orpheum Theatre, Minneapolis, Minnesota (1921)
- The Orpheum Theatre, Wichita, Kansas (1922)
- The Orpheum Theater, Sioux City, Iowa (1927)
- The Orpheum Theater, Sioux Falls, South Dakota
- The Orpheum Theatre, St. Louis, Missouri (1917)
- The Orpheum Theatre, Okmulgee, Oklahoma (1919)
- The Orpheum Theater, Conrad, Montana (1917)
- The IVCCD Orpheum Theater Center, Marshalltown, Iowa
- The Morris Performing Arts Center, South Bend, Indiana (originally Palace Theater) (1922)

== Closed theaters ==
- The Orpheum Theatre, New Bedford, Massachusetts (1912)
- The Orpheum Theatre, Champaign, Illinois (1914)

== Demolished theaters ==
- Grand Opera House in Los Angeles, 110 S. Main Street (built 1884, closed 1937). First of four homes of the Orpheum circuit in the city.
- Lyceum Theatre, Los Angeles, second home of the circuit in Los Angeles, 227 S. Spring Street, (opened 1888, closed 1941).
- The Orpheum Theatre in Portland, Oregon: built in 1913, remodeled in 1926 and demolished circa 1976.
- The Orpheum Theater in Seattle, Washington: built in 1927; demolished in 1967.
- The Orpheum Theater in Oakland, California: built in 1923
- The Orpheum Theater in Tulsa, Oklahoma: built in 1923 (designed by John Eberson), demolished in 1971
- The Orpheum Theater in Oklahoma City, Oklahoma: built in 1903, demolished in 1964
- The Orpheum Theatre and complex (originally 18 stores, offices, pool hall, ballroom and a cafe) in Springfield, Illinois: built in 1927, demolished in 1965
- The Orpheum Theater, 5th & Edmond Street, St. Joseph, Missouri, built c. 1910, demolished 1975

== See also ==
- Alexander Pantages
- Vaudeville Managers Association
