= New York Stars =

New York Stars could refer to:

- New York Stars (WBL), a team that played two seasons in the Women's Professional Basketball League before disbanding in 1980
- New York Stars (WFL), a team in the World Football League that relocated in 1974 and became the Charlotte Hornets (WFL)
