= Gerald Schoenfeld =

American theatre manager (1924–2008)

- Born: September 22, 1924; New York, New York
- Died: November 25, 2008 (aged 84); New York, New York
- Education: University of Illinois; New York University School of Law
- Occupation: Chairman of The Shubert Organization (1972–2008)
- Spouse: Pat Schoenfeld (m. 1950–2008)
- Children: Carrie Schoenfeld-Guglielmi

Gerald Schoenfeld (September 22, 1924 – November 25, 2008) was chairman of The Shubert Organization from 1972 to 2008.

== Career ==
After graduating from the University of Illinois, Schoenfeld fought in World War II. On his return, he obtained a law degree from New York University and got a job with a local law firm then known as Klein & Weir. One of the firm's clients was the Shubert Organization, which was represented by Adolph Lund, a partner in the firm and a name partner when the firm's name was changed to Klein & Lund. After Adolph Lund's death at age 49 on January 1, 1957, Jacob J. Shubert, the surviving Shubert brother, hired Schoenfeld to represent him and his interests. Schoenfeld was 32 at the time. Later that same year, Jacob J. Shubert, encouraged Schoenfeld to hire a second primary lawyer. Schoenfeld hired his brother's childhood friend, Bernard B. Jacobs.

A power struggle for control of the organization followed J.J. Shubert's death in 1963. By 1972, Schoenfeld and Jacobs had taken control of the organization. Schoenfeld tended to manage the maintenance and operational aspect of the theaters, while Jacobs was more involved in the artistic aspect. The two are credited with pulling American theater out of a steep downward spiral in the early 1970s and making it into a profitable enterprise.

As of 2008, the Shubert Organization owned 17 Broadway theaters, one off-Broadway theater, and major theaters in Boston, Philadelphia, and Washington, D.C. It remains the preeminent organization in American theater.

In 2004, Broadway's Plymouth Theatre was renamed The Gerald Schoenfeld Theatre in his honor.

== Book ==
His memoir, Mr. Broadway: The Inside Story of the Shuberts, the Shows, and the Stars, was published posthumously in 2012.

== Death ==
Schoenfeld died from a heart attack in 2008. He was 84.
