= Entertainment Community Fund =

American charitable organization

- Founded: June 8, 1882; 144 years ago
- Founder: Albert Marshman Palmer
- Type: Charitable organization
- Tax ID no.: 13-1635251
- Legal status: 501(c)(3)
- Headquarters: New York City, U.S.
- Coordinates: 40.760212°N 73.983562°W
- Services: To provide housing, social services and emergency financial assistance, health services and employment training to performing arts and entertainment professionals.
- Chairman of the Board: Annette Bening
- President, Chief Executive Officer: Joseph P. Benincasa
- Subsidiaries: Actors Fund Housing Development Corp _{(501(c)(3))}, Aurora Housing Development Fund Corp _{(501(c)(3))}, Aurora West 57th Corporation _{(C Corp)}
- Revenue: $36,832,752 (2017)
- Expenses: $34,504,429 (2017)
- Endowment: $15,204,554 _{(2017)}
- Employees: 322 (2017)
- Volunteers: 92 (2017)
- Website: entertainmentcommunity.org

The Entertainment Community Fund, formerly The Actors Fund, is a 501(c)(3) charitable organization that supports performers and behind-the-scenes workers in performing arts and entertainment, helping more than 17,000 people directly each year. Serving professionals in film, theatre, television, music, opera, radio, and dance, the Fund's programs include social services and emergency financial assistance, healthcare and insurance counseling, supportive and affordable housing, and employment and training services. The Fund owns and operates the Lillian Booth Actors Home, a skilled nursing and assisted living facility in Englewood, New Jersey.

== History ==
The Entertainment Community Fund was founded as the Actors Fund of America by Albert Marshman Palmer on June 8, 1882, largely due to the efforts of former New York University student Harrison Grey Fiske, editor of the New York Dramatic Mirror, who was aware of the many problems faced by those in the profession. The Actors Fund's first meeting was held in the theatre of president J. Lester Wallack. The Actors Fund's first officers were Lester Wallack, president; Albert M. Palmer, vice president; Daniel Frohman, secretary; and Theodore More, treasurer. The original bylaws said that the organization existed to "foster and benefit the physical, as well as advance the intellectual, welfare of the actors of America."

Funds raised at the 1892 Fair, held at Madison Square Garden, enabled the charity to provide individuals and families with assistance, including burial plots in a Brooklyn cemetery and accommodations in the Actors' Fund Home.

During the next decades, benefit performances held throughout the country raised significant amounts of revenue to subsidize the Fund's many projects. From 1960 through 1978 Louise Heims Beck was chairman of the Actors Fund's governing board. Today, the Fund sponsors many special events and performances, with numerous Broadway stars and Hollywood celebrities hosting, performing, and attending. Theatres throughout the country frequently pledge proceeds from regularly scheduled performances to the charity.

Offices are maintained in New York, Los Angeles, and Chicago. Additionally, the Fund is associated with a range of sister organizations which raise money through donations, including Broadway Cares/Equity Fights AIDS, the guild/union relief funds of Actors' Equity, AFTRA; AGMA; AGVA; Episcopal Actors' Guild; the Jazz Foundation; the Professional Dancers Society; MusiCares, Society of Singers, and the Lambs.

In 1997, the Actors' Work Program (AWP) was incorporated into the Actors Fund's full spectrum of services. Today, the Actors Fund Work Program (AWP) assists entertainment industry and performing arts professionals in identifying and finding sideline work and new careers. The Fund in New York also hosts a weekly creative writing workshop held on Thursdays for disabled and senior citizen performers.

The Fund operates the Dorothy Ross Friedman Residence (formerly the Aurora), a site which provides supportive housing to special low-income groups including seniors, working professionals and people living with AIDS. The Dorothy Ross Friedman Residence opened in 1996 (as the Aurora) and the Actors Fund provides on-site social services for residents. The social services group provides information and referral to community resources, entitlement program advocacy, coordination of home care and medical services, outreach, health education and support groups. The on-site social services staff includes two social workers, three case managers, and an activities coordinator. The Actors Fund developed this supportive housing project with its partner, the Related Companies.

The Actors Fund's Palm View residence is a similar residential facility, located in West Hollywood, California. The Palm View, opened in 1998, is a 40-unit apartment complex that provides homes to low-income people with HIV/AIDS. The Palm View is a collaborative project between the Actors Fund, the West Hollywood Community Housing Corporation, Housing for Entertainment Professionals and various funders. The buildings are managed by the West Hollywood Community Housing Corporation.

The Fund also owns and operates the 6-acre (24,000 m^{2}) Lillian Booth Actors Home, in Englewood, New Jersey, a nursing home and assisted living care facility for retired members of the entertainment community. The home is licensed by the Department of Health and qualifies for Medicaid and Medicare. Individuals who have dedicated a major portion of their professional lives to the entertainment industry are eligible for admission. The Actors Fund provides funds to subsidize the care residents receive.

One of the earliest services the Actors Fund provided was assistance with the cost and arrangements of funerals and burials. In 1886, the Actors Fund purchased its first plot at the Cemetery of the Evergreens in Brooklyn, New York, and, in 1904, a second plot was purchased at Kensico Cemetery in Valhalla, New York. These plots are the final resting place of over 2,000 members of the entertainment industry. Today, the Fund continues to assist with the cost of funerals and provide a grave site with a headstone to those in need. In addition, the Fund offers pre-pay arrangements for those interested in purchasing a grave site.

In 2014, Fund President and CEO Joseph P. Benincasa received the Tony Honors for Excellence in Theatre for outstanding contribution to the theatrical community for 25 years of service to the Fund. On September 21, 2015, the organization announced that it would merge with Career Transition for Dancers. In March, 2017, the Actors Fund opened the Samuel J. Friedman Health Center for the Performing Arts in New York City. This facility is in partnership with Mount Sinai Hospital and offers medical care for everyone in entertainment.

In May 2022, the organization changed its name to the Entertainment Community Fund, reflecting the broad scope of professionals the organization serves. In June 2023, Annette Bening was elected Chair of the Board of Trustees for the Entertainment Community Fund.

== Services ==
The Fund's programs include social services and emergency financial assistance, healthcare and insurance counseling, supportive and affordable housing, and employment and training services.

== See also ==
- Motion Picture and Television Fund
- Actors Fund Medal of Honor
