= George Godfrey (vaudeville) =

American theatre agent and producer

George A. Godfrey
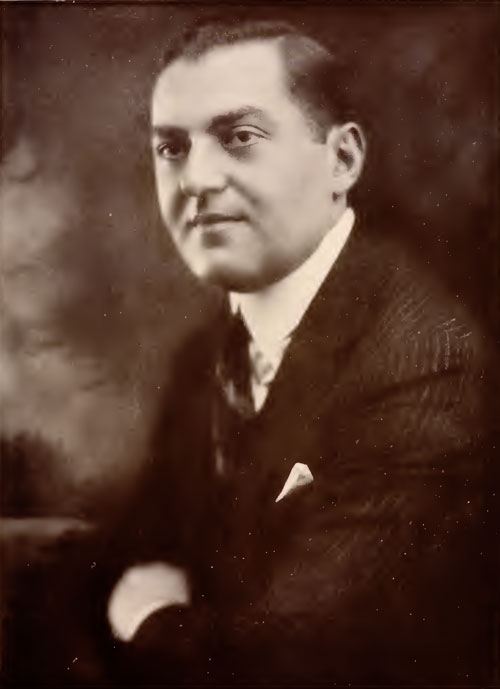
- 1927 publicity photo
- Born: April 2, 1886
- Died: April 17, 1974 (aged 88); Miami Beach, Florida, U.S.
- Occupations: General Manager, Orpheum Circuit; Casting director, Columbia Pictures
- Years active: 1913-1961

George A. Godfrey (April 2, 1886 - April 17, 1974), was the general manager of the Orpheum Circuit in charge of bookings.

== Biography ==
Godfrey was born on April 2, 1886. He replaced Edward Valentine Darling as the general manager for the Orpheum Circuit, booking acts for the Palace Theatre among others, starting in 1913. In 1929, he became the head casting director for RKO Pictures and served the same role for Columbia Pictures from 1941 until his retirement in 1961.

Godfrey died on April 17, 1974, at the Ankara Hotel in Miami Beach, Florida.
