= E. F. Albee =

American vaudeville impresario (1857–1930)

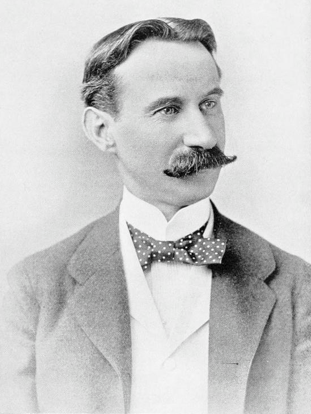
- Albee circa 1894
- Born: Edward Franklin Albee II; October 8, 1857; Machias, Maine, US
- Died: March 11, 1930 (aged 72); Palm Beach, Florida, US
- Occupations: Vaudevillian impresario, producer
- Spouse: Laurette Frances Smith
- Children: 4, including Reed A. Albee
- Relatives: Edward Franklin Albee III, adopted grandson

Edward Franklin Albee II (October 8, 1857 – March 11, 1930) was an American vaudeville impresario.

== Early life ==
Albee was born on October 8, 1857, in Machias, Maine, to Nathaniel Smith Albee and Amanda Higgins Crocker.

== Career ==
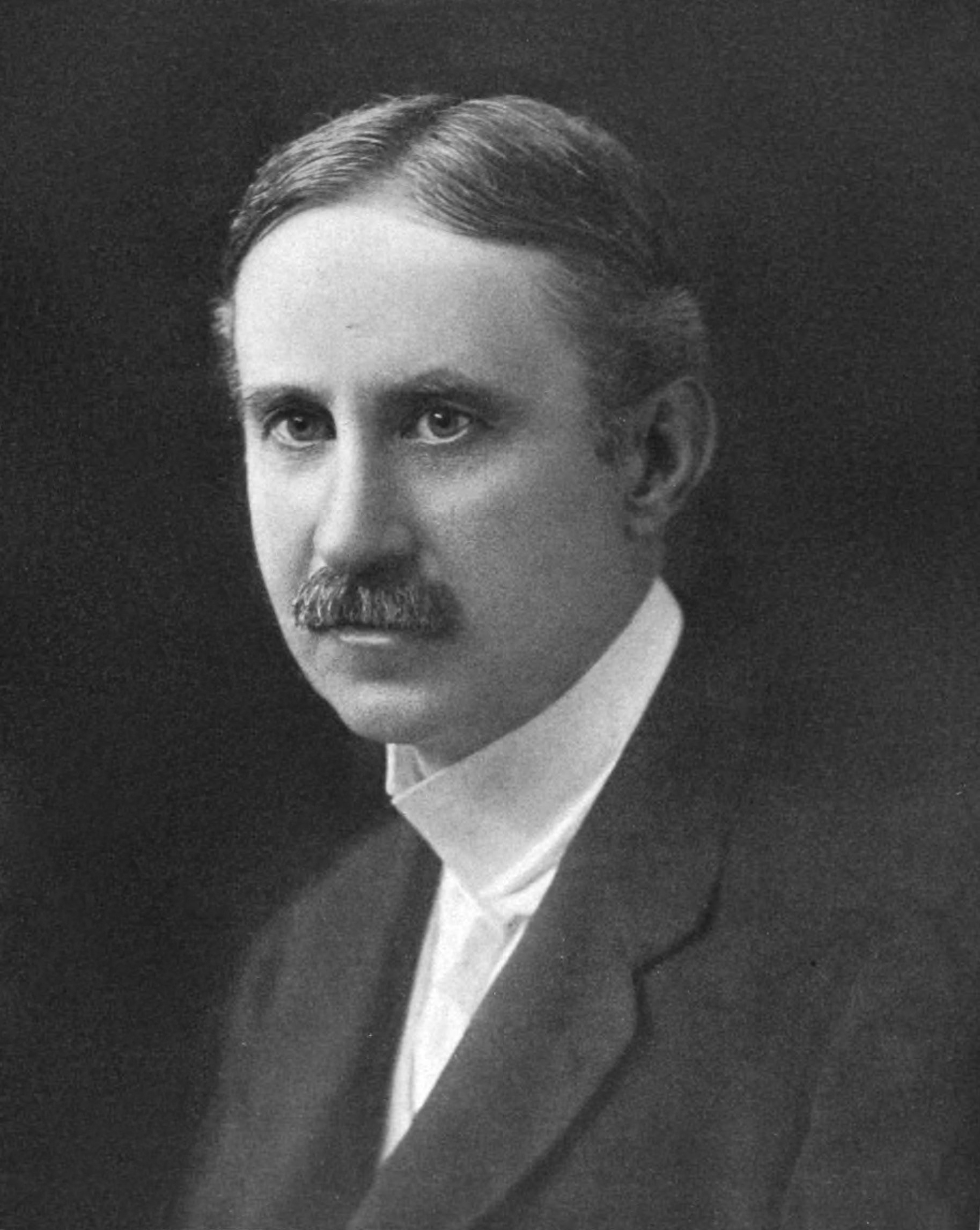
Edward F. Albee in 1908

He toured with P. T. Barnum as a roustabout, then, in 1885, he partnered with Benjamin Franklin Keith in operating the Bijou Theatre in Boston, Massachusetts. With the success of their business, it grew into the Keith-Albee theatre circuit of vaudeville theatres. Albee gradually took managerial control of Keith's theatrical circuit. They were the first to introduce moving pictures in the United States.

In 1900, Pat Shea of Buffalo proposed to Keith and Albee that they should set up a shared booking arrangement for vaudeville similar to the Theatrical Syndicate. They called a meeting in May 1900 in Boston of most of the major vaudeville managers, including Weber & Fields, Tony Pastor, Hyde & Behman of Brooklyn, Kohl & Castle, Colonel J.D. Hopkins, and Meyerfield & Beck of the Orpheum Circuit of the western United States.

They did not invite Frederick Freeman Proctor, Keith's main competitor, but the other managers objected and insisted on a meeting in New York where Proctor was invited. The Vaudeville Managers Association (VMA) was founded at the New York meeting. Keith and Albee dominated the new organization. Albee was president of the VMA's United Bookings Office from its formation in 1906. Albee had most of the major vaudeville circuits give him control of their theatrical bookings where he charged acts a 5% commission.

When performers tried to form a union (White Rats), he set up National Vaudeville Artists and made membership in it a requirement for booking through his company. The National Vaudeville Artists built the National Vaudeville Artists Hospital, which later became the Will Rogers Memorial Hospital related to the Cure cottages of Saranac Lake. Edwards Davis was a president (1921) of the National Vaudeville Artists.

His partner, Benjamin Franklin Keith, died in Palm Beach, Florida, in 1914.

He formed the Keith-Albee-Orpheum corporation on January 28, 1928, with Joseph P. Kennedy. Radio Corporation of America bought his company and formed RKO Pictures ("Radio-Keith-Orpheum") and turned the Orpheum vaudeville circuit into a chain of movie theaters.

=== Anecdotes ===
Many entertainers considered Albee's tactics tyrannical. Groucho Marx referred to the United Bookings Office as "Albee's Gestapo".

Joe Frisco summed up the impression of power Albee made; exiting Albee's office into a street under construction, his agent wondered why the street was being torn up and Frisco quipped, "Albee's kid lost his ball."

Albee appears as a minor character in the film Yankee Doodle Dandy and in the 1968 Broadway musical, George M!.

== Personal life ==
Albee married Lauretta Frances Smith (1861–1960), with whom he had:

- Albee (d. 1916)
- Edward Albee (1883–1883), who died young
- Reed A. Albee (1886–1961), who married Louise Holmes Williams, an actress, in 1914. They divorced in 1925 and in the same year, he married Frances Cotter.
- Ethel Keith Albee (1890–1976), who married Edwin George Lauder Jr. (1883–1955) in 1914. They divorced in 1941.

On March 11, 1930, Albee died at the Breakers Hotel in Palm Beach, Florida. In his will, his estate was valued in excess of $2,000,000 (equivalent to $38,545,800 in 2025) and he left his wife $1,000,000 (equivalent to $19,272,900 in 2025), among many charitable donations that supported The Actors' Fund, Percy Williams Home, Variety Artists' Benevolent Fund and Institution.

=== Descendants ===
His grandson was Edward Albee, the playwright, who was adopted by his son, Reed.

== See also ==
- 1900 US census with Albees in Manhattan
- USS Beaumere II (SP-444)
- Albee Square
