= Keith-Albee-Orpheum =

Owners of an American chain of vaudeville and motion picture theatres

- Entrance to B.F. Keith's Palace Theatre in New York City c. 1915, a flagship venue of the Keith-Albee-Orpheum circuit
- Founded: January 28, 1928; 98 years ago United States
- Defunct: October 1928; 98 years ago
- Successor: RKO Pictures
- Headquarters: Delaware, United States

The Keith-Albee-Orpheum Corporation was the owner of a chain of vaudeville and motion picture theatres. It was formed by the merger of the holdings of Benjamin Franklin Keith (B.F. Keith Circuit) and Edward Franklin Albee II and Martin Beck's Orpheum Circuit.

== History ==
The company was incorporated in Delaware on January 28, 1928, to acquire the stocks of the B.F. Keith Corporation; Orpheum Circuit, Inc.; Vaudeville Collection Agency; B.F. Keith-Albee Vaudeville Exchange; and Greater New York Corporation. The company operated a chain of vaudeville and motion picture theatres in the United States and Canada with a seating capacity of 1,500,000 persons. The combined theater chain then had over 700 theaters in the United States and Canada. A total of 15,000 vaudeville performers were booked through the new entity.

In May 1928, a controlling portion of stock was sold to Joseph P. Kennedy, from whom it was purchased in October by the Radio Corporation of America (RCA) as part of the deal, along with Film Booking Offices of America (FBO), that created the major motion picture studio Radio Keith Orpheum (RKO Pictures).

After the establishment of RKO, motion pictures became the primary focus of entertainment at the former KAO theaters. Vaudeville survived only as an interlude for feature films.

== Theaters ==
- Keith-Albee Theatre, Huntington, West Virginia
- Keith-Albee Theater, Washington, D.C.
- Keith-Albee Theatre, Flushing, Queens
- RKO Albee Theatre, Cincinnati, Ohio
- RKO Keith's Theater (Richmond Hill, Queens)
