= USS Get There =

Patrol vessel of the United States Navy

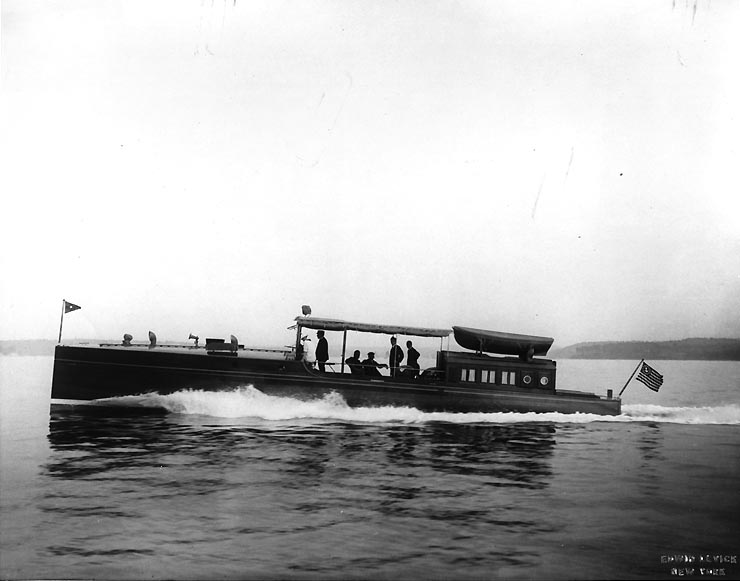
- Get There as a private motor yacht sometime in 1916 or 1917.

History

United States
- Name: USS Get There
- Namesake: Previous name retained
- Builder: Wood & McClure, City Island, the Bronx, New York
- Completed: 1916
- Acquired: Leased 28 June 1917; Delivered 14 July 1917
- Commissioned: 10 August 1917
- Decommissioned: 6 March 1919
- Fate: Returned to owners 13 March 1919
- Notes: Operated as private motorboat Get There 1916-1917 and from 1919

General characteristics
- Type: Patrol vessel
- Tonnage: 15 gross register tons
- Length: 58 ft 1.5 in (17.717 m)
- Beam: 10 ft 6 in (3.20 m)
- Draft: 3 ft 6 in (1.07 m)
- Speed: 28 knots
- Complement: 8
- Armament: 1 × 1-pounder gun; 2 × .30-caliber (7.62-mm) machine guns

USS Get There (SP-579) was a United States Navy section patrol craft in commission from 1917 to 1919.

Get There was built as a private motor yacht of the same name in 1916 by Wood & McClure at City Island, the Bronx, New York. On 28 June 1917, the U.S. Navy acquired her under a free lease from her owners, J. S. Bache and F. L. Richards of New York City, for use as a section patrol boat during World War I. The Navy took delivery of her on 14 July 1917 and she was commissioned as USS Get There (SP-579) on 10 August 1917.

Assigned to the 3rd Naval District, Get There served on section patrol and general transportation duties in New York Harbor for the remainder of World War I except for winter periods, when she was laid up in the marine basin at the New York Navy Yard.

Get There was decommissioned at New York City on 6 March 1919. The Navy returned her to her owners on 13 March 1919.

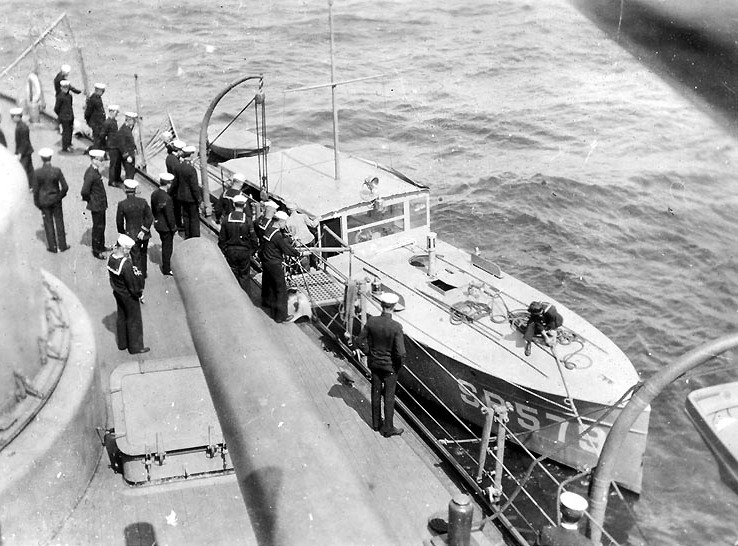
USS Get There (SP-579) alongside the battleship USS Indiana (Battleship No. 1) in New York Harbor in 1917 or 1918, performing transportation services as an admiral's barge.
