= Martin Beck (vaudeville) =

American theatre owner (1868–1940)

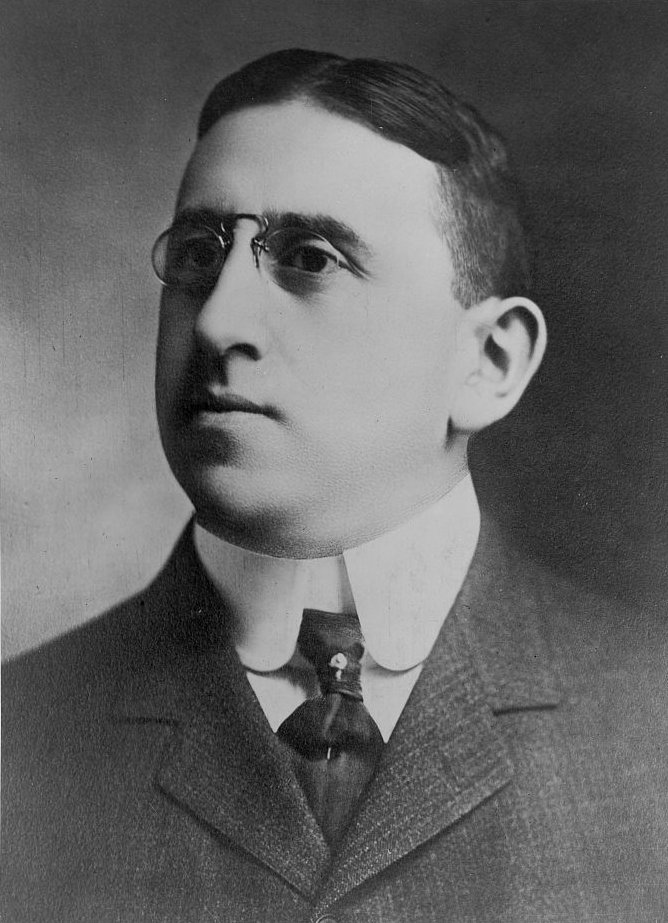
- Born: July 31, 1868; Liptószentmiklós, Kingdom of Hungary (today Liptovský Mikuláš, Slovakia)
- Died: November 16, 1940 (aged 72); New York City, U.S.
- Occupations: Theater owner, Theatrical manager and booking agent

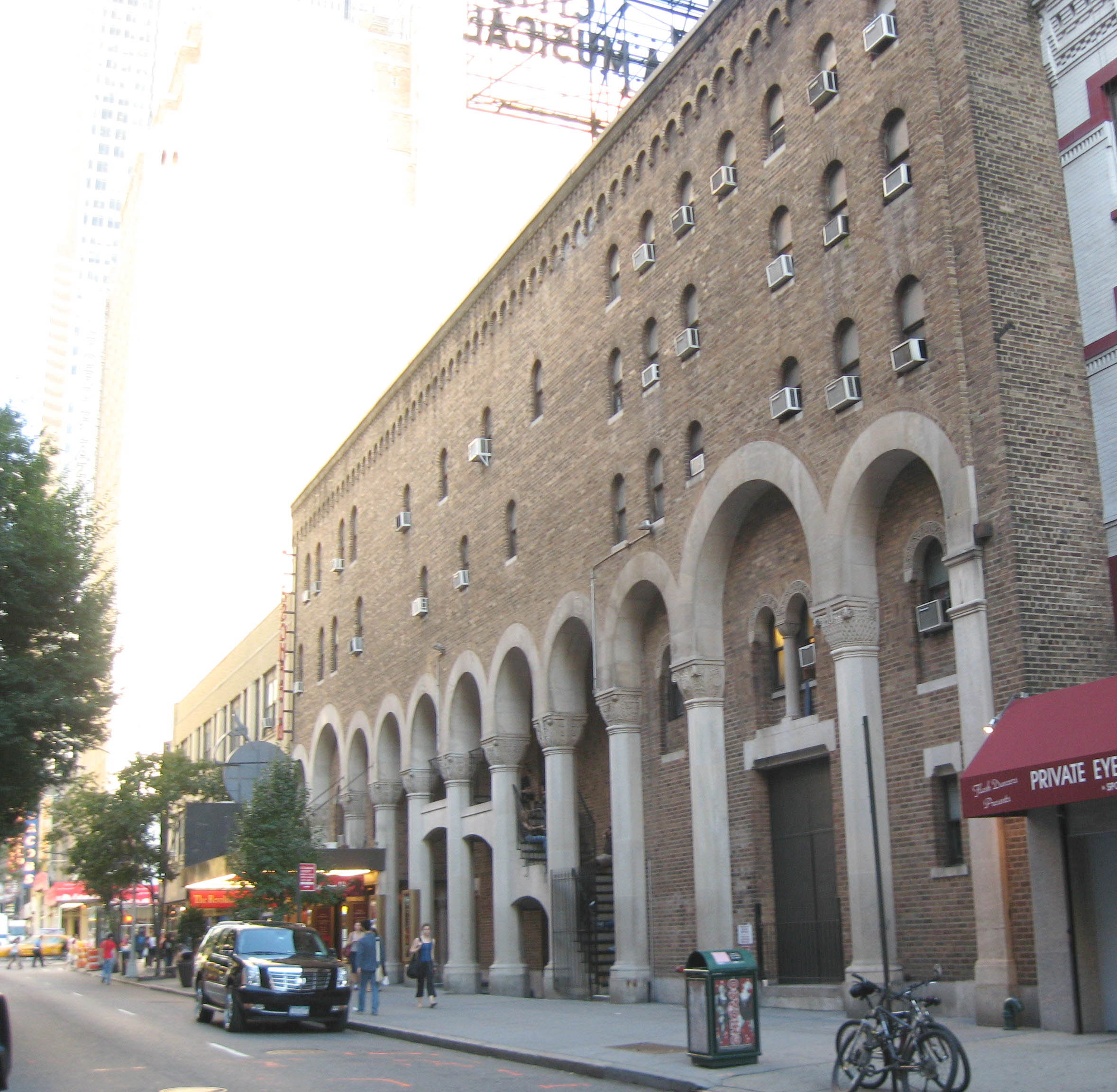
The Martin Beck Theater, now the Al Hirschfeld Theatre, at 302 West 45th Street in Manhattan

Martin Beck (July 31, 1868 – November 16, 1940) was a vaudeville theatre owner and manager, and theatrical booking agent, who founded the Orpheum Circuit, and built the Palace and Martin Beck Theatres in New York City's Broadway Theatre District. He was a booking agent for, and became a close personal friend of the prominent magician, Harry Houdini.

== Early life ==
Martin Beck was born to a Jewish family on July 31, 1868, in Liptószentmiklós, Kingdom of Hungary (now Liptovský Mikuláš, Slovakia). He went with a group of actors on the SS Elbe from Bremen, Germany, to the United States in May 1884, where he worked as a waiter in a beer garden in Chicago.

He went to San Francisco with the Schiller Vaudeville Company, then gained citizenship in the United States in October 1889. When the Orpheum Theatre in San Francisco was bought by Morris Meyerfeld Jr. in 1899, he worked with Morris to acquire more theaters. By 1905, Beck was running the organization.

== Influence on career of Harry Houdini ==
In the spring of 1899, Beck met Harry Houdini, who was then performing at a beer hall in St. Paul, Minnesota. Beck saw Houdini struggling with magic, so he made an offer, Beck telegraphed Houdini when he got to his next stop in Chicago: "You can open Omaha, March twenty sixth, sixty dollars, will see act probably make you proposition for all next season."

According to Houdini's wife when speaking to a biographer years later, this represented Houdini's big break in his professional career as a performing magician. As Houdini wrote at the bottom of the telegram, which she had carefully preserved: "This wire changed my whole Life's journey."

Beck and Houdini became close personal friends. Beck advised Houdini to concentrate on his escape acts, and booked him on the Orpheum vaudeville circuit. Within months, Houdini was performing at the top vaudeville houses all over the United States, and in 1900, Beck arranged for him to tour Europe.

== Theatre management and ownership ==
He built the Palace Theatre in New York City in 1913. In 1920 he married vaudeville performer Louise Heims, and she closely assisted him in all his theatrical endeavors.

He was voted out of the presidency of Orpheum Circuit in a boardroom coup after it went public in 1923. The following year, he opened the Martin Beck Theater in New York City (renamed the Al Hirschfeld Theatre in 2003).

On January 28, 1928, Orpheum Circuit was merged with the theater chain started by Benjamin Franklin Keith and Edward Franklin Albee II to form Keith-Albee-Orpheum. A few months later, Joseph P. Kennedy and David Sarnoff of Radio Corporation of America merged Keith-Albee-Orpheum with Film Booking Office of America to form the Radio-Keith-Orpheum (RKO) movie studio.

In 1932 he managed the booking office at RKO. In 1934 he brought the D'Oyly Carte Opera Company from London to America.

== Death ==
Beck died at Mount Sinai Hospital in Manhattan on November 16, 1940. Arthur Hopkins gave the eulogy at the funeral; honorary pall bearers included William A. Brady, John Golden, Sam H. Harris, Lawrence Langner, Guthrie McClintic, Lee Shubert and Herman Shumlin.
