= Morris Meyerfeld Jr. =

American businessman

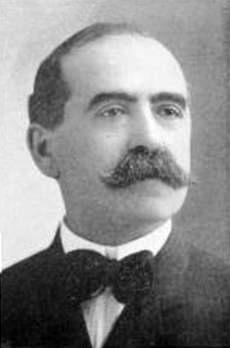
- Morris Meyerfeld ca. 1900s
- Born: November 17, 1855; Beverungen, Kingdom of Prussia
- Died: June 20, 1935 (aged 79); San Francisco, California, U.S.A.
- Occupation(s): Entrepreneur, theater owner

Morris Meyerfeld Jr. (November 17, 1855 – June 20, 1935) was a German-born American entrepreneur who through the Orpheum Circuit dominated the vaudeville market west of the Mississippi for nearly two decades.

== Early life ==
Moses Meyerfeld (later known as Morris Meyerfeld Jr.) was born in Beverungen, a small town that occupies both banks of the Weser River in the Province of Westphalia, Kingdom of Prussia. As a boy he received his education at schools in Cologne before sailing on the SS Frisia to America in the spring of 1874; the year his father, Herz Meyerfeld, died. Morris Meyerfeld was the middle of three brothers who immigrated to America between 1872 and 1876 to settle in San Francisco. Morris, Joseph (Josef) and Jesse (Jesaja) all went on to be merchants engaged in similar lines of commerce as their uncle Moses Meyerfeld (1829–1892), a San Franciscan cigar wholesaler who came to California from Germany in 1850.

== Career ==
In 1879 Meyerfeld was asked to take over operation of a successful dry goods store in Vallejo, California by the shop's owner, his maternal uncle, Salomon Dannebaum. At around this time his brothers were employed by L. Siebenhauer & Co. in San Francisco, Jesse as a tobacco dealer and Joseph as a foreman. A few years later Mayerfeld and his brother Jesse formed a business partnership with John S. Mitchell and Levi Siebenhauer. From their place of business on 116 Front Street, the firm Meyerfeld, Mitchell and Siebenhauer engaged in the manufacturing of cigars and as wholesalers of wines and liquors. Through this enterprise Meyerfeld would be placed in a position within a few years to assume ownership of the city's financially strapped Orpheum Theatre.

Also known as the Orpheum Opera House, the 3,500 seat venue on O'Farrell Street between Stockton and Powell was built by Gustav Walter in 1887 and was for a time the most luxurious theater in the West. Walter, a native of Prussia, became successful at the Orpheum putting on variety shows that appealed to wide audiences often with exotic acts from the East Coast and Europe rarely seen in the West. With his success in San Francisco Walter began to expand his organization, by then known as the Orpheum Circuit, to include leases on theaters in Los Angeles and Kansas City. In 1897 Walter turned the Orpheum into a vaudeville–only venue and shortly thereafter became overextended and was unable to pay the Orpheum's $50,000 liquor bill owed to the firm Meyerfeld, Mitchell and Siebenhauer.

Accounts differ on whether Walter lost total control of his organization at this point or was able to continue with Meyerfeld as a principal partner and investor. Meyerfeld did become the head of the Orpheum Circuit the following year when Gustav Walter died in Los Angeles while being prepared for an emergency appendectomy operation. Meyerfeld had the means to purchase the outstanding shares of the Orpheum Circuit from Walter's heirs before launching an aggressive expansion of their operation west of the Mississippi River with the help of Martin Beck, his gifted general manager.

By 1911 the Orpheum Circuit had grown to be the largest in the West, owning outright twelve grand theaters with leases on dozens more. Meyerfeld was credited with bringing "modern vaudeville" to the Western United States with quality entertainment performed in palatial theaters. He was, if not the first, one of the first showmen in the region to pay his talent's traveling expenses to lure vaudeville acts west. Meyerfeld was admired by his contemporaries as a good manager who ran a model business organization. According to his New York Times obituary, San Franciscans considered Meyerfeld "the Rockefeller of Vaudeville".

In the early 1900s Meyerfeld and Beck formed an alliance with United Booking Offices, an organization that came about following a merger between the B. F. Keith and F.F. Proctor circuits, that gave the Orpheum Circuit, through its booking agency, Central Vaudeville Promotion Co., control over virtual every vaudeville house of that time west of Chicago. This arrangement and other similar trust agreements would later lead to antitrust charges from state and federal agencies along with lawsuits from competitors at home and abroad and from groups representing vaudeville talent who felt these types of agreements between competing vaudeville circuits drove down wages.

On December 3, 1919, Meyerfeld in San Francisco and Beck from New York City announced that the Orpheum Circuit had merged with several Midwestern vaudeville circuits, such as Cole and Castle, Cella and Tate, Fehr and Singer, and the Finn-Himan Corporation. The new company was to be called Orpheum Circuit Consolidated (later Orpheum Circuit Inc.) and would operate some fifty venues including every major vaudeville house west of the Mississippi River between Chicago and New Orleans and as far north as Western Canada In 1920 Martin Beck became president of Orpheum Circuit Inc. and Morris Meyerfeld Chairman of the Board, a largely ceremonial position that ended his day-to-day involvement in the operation. That same year Beck married Meyerfeld's niece, Louise Heims Beck, who was a librarian turned vaudeville singer. She became a close working companion of Beck's, assisting him in his theatrical endeavors and later co-founding the American Theatre Wing.

Faced with declining vaudeville audiences, Orpheum Circuit Inc. merged with the Keith-Albee Circuit in 1928 to form a national chain with some two hundred major venues coast-to-coast. Later that year Keith-Albee-Orpheum merged with David Sarnoff's Radio Corporation of America (RCA) to form Radio-Keith-Orpheum Pictures (RKO Pictures).

The original Orpheum Theatre was destroyed in the 1906 San Francisco earthquake and was rebuilt three years later near the same site. This venue remained open until 1937 before becoming a causality of talking motion pictures and the Great Depression. Today the Palace Theatre in Los Angeles, the third Orpheum built in that city, is the oldest remaining theater in the nation that was constructed under Meyerfeld's stewardship; celebrating its centennial year on June 26, 2011.

== Republican delegate ==
In 1912 Meyerfeld was chosen from California's 4th congressional district as a delegate to the Republican National Convention. A supporter of President William Howard Taft, he was eventually seated after surviving a challenge from backers of former President Theodore Roosevelt.

== Marriage ==
In 1886 Meyerfeld married Nannie Friedman (1867–1959), a San Francisco native of German-Scottish parents, and the following year became the father of Elizabeth Leslie, his only child. Elizabeth later married Leon Lazare Roos, a Bay Area merchant, and took up residence at a house Meyerfeld had built for the newlyweds. Designed by architect Bernard Maybeck, the Roos home on 3500 Jackson Street cost $36,000 to construct, a princely sum for the time, and is today considered a San Francisco landmark.

== Death ==
On June 20, 1935, Morris Meyerfeld died at his residence in the Mark Hopkins Hotel on Nob Hill. He was survived by his wife of forty-nine years and daughter. Jesse Meyerfeld later in life opened a restaurant in San Francisco, while Joseph Meyerfeld remained in the cigar business after relocating to Brooklyn, New York. Both brothers most likely died in the 1920s. At the time of his death Morris Meyerfeld's estate was estimated to have a value in the neighborhood of one-million dollars. In 2017, his historic home (built in 1909) that he passed on to his decedents was listed on the market for $16 million. The original home cost $50,000 to build.

== Sources ==
Source material derived from census records, passport applications, passenger ship manifests, business directories and funeral records scanned by Ancestry.com, newspaper articles scanned by Ancestry.com, Google News, New York Times Historical and NewspaperARCHIVE.com and publications scanned by Google Books.
