= The Vaudeville News =

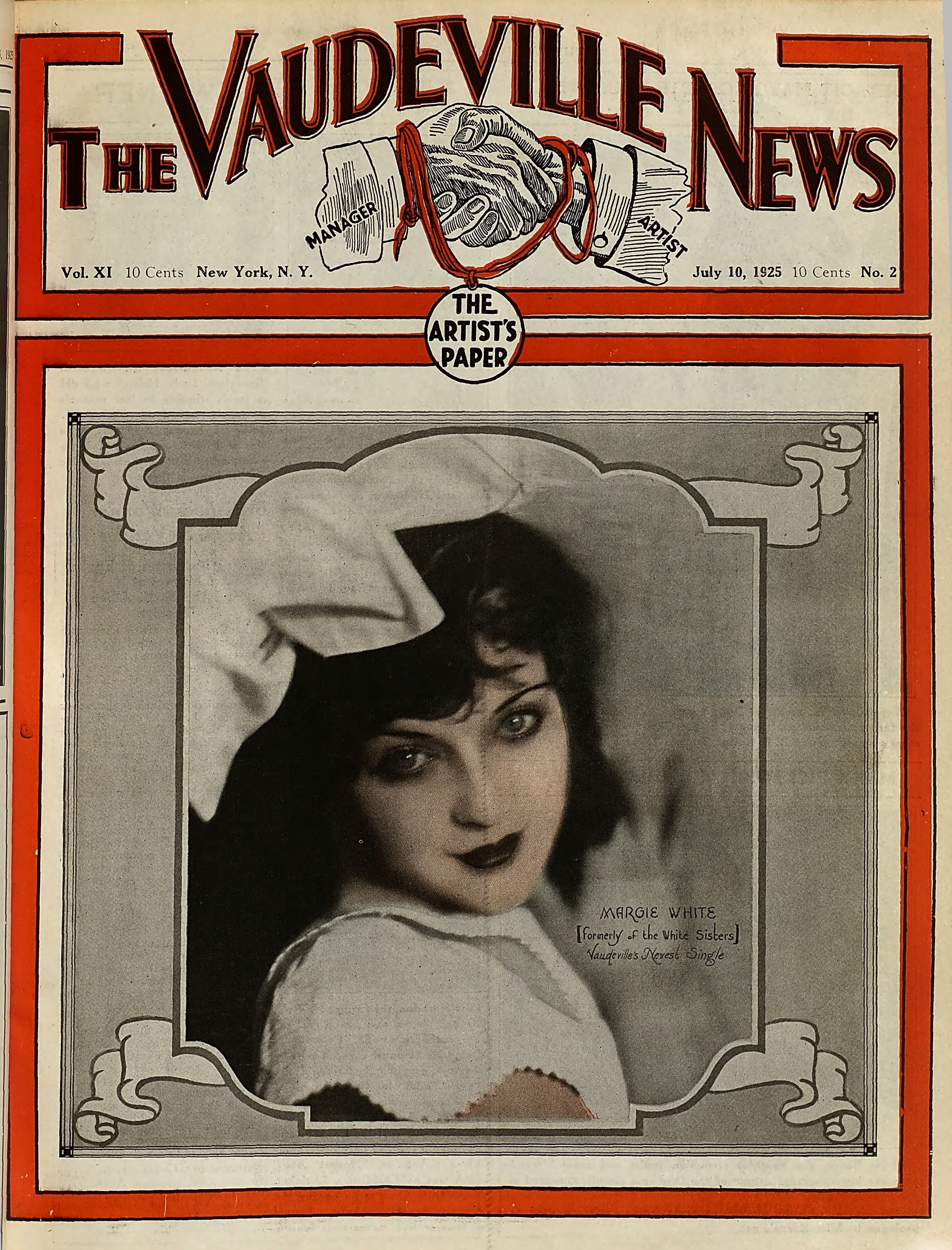
- Type: Weekly newspaper
- Owner(s): E.F. Albee
- Founded: 1920
- Headquarters: New York City, New York

The Vaudeville News (1920–1926) was a weekly newspaper created by the Vaudeville tycoon E.F. Albee in 1920. It was intended for Vaudeville actors and their managers to provide news, information, and advertising to those in the business.

The newspaper merged with the New York Star (founded 1908) in 1926.
