= Peppy =

Peppy may refer to:

- Peppy (mascot), the polar bear mascot and icon of Fox's Glacier Mints
- Peppy Blount, American college football player
- Peppy Campus, Italian sports shooter
- Peppy Fields, American singer
- Peppy Hare, a Star Fox character
- Peppy Martin, American public relations executive
- Dean Herbert (developer), nicknamed peppy
