= Sophie Tucker =

Ukrainian-American singer, comedian and actress (1886–1966)

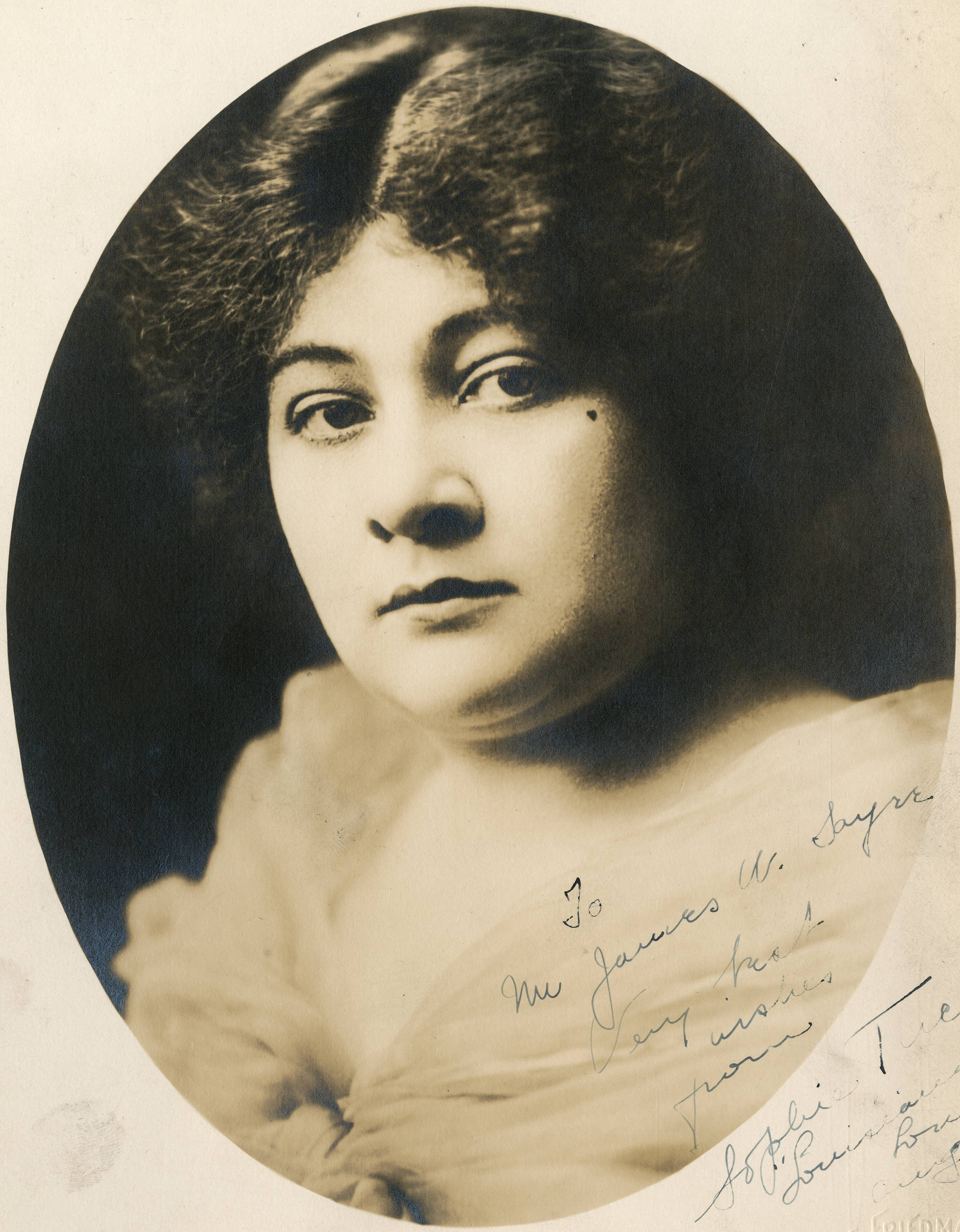
- Tucker in 1912
- Born: Sofia Kalish; January 13, 1886; Tulchyn, Podolia, Russian Empire
- Died: February 9, 1966 (aged 80); New York City, United States
- Other names: Sophie Tuck; Sophie Abuza; The Last of the Red Hot Mamas
- Occupations: Singer; actress; comedian; radio personality
- Years active: 1903–1966
- Spouses: Louis Tuck (m. 1903; div. 1913) Frank Westphal (m. 1917; div. 1920) Al Lackey (m. 1928; div. 1934)
- Children: 1

Sophie Tucker (born Sofia Kalish; January 13, 1886 – February 9, 1966) was a Jewish-American singer, comedian, actress, and radio personality. Known for her powerful delivery of comical and risqué songs, she was one of the most popular entertainers in the U.S. during the first half of the 20th century. She was known by the nickname "the Last of the Red-Hot Mamas".

== Early life and education ==
Tucker was born Sofiya "Sonya" Kalish (Ukrainian: Соня Калиш; Russian: Софья «Соня» Калиш; Yiddish: סאָפיאַ קאַליש) in 1886 to a Jewish family in Tulchyn, Russian Empire, now Vinnytsia Oblast, Ukraine. (Sonya is a pet name for Sofiya in both Russian and Ukrainian as well as for Sofya, the Yiddish form of the name Sophia.) They arrived in Boston on September 26, 1887. The family adopted the surname Abuza before immigrating, her father fearing repercussions for having deserted from the Imperial Russian Army. The family lived in Boston's North End for eight years then settled in Hartford, Connecticut, and opened a restaurant.

At a young age, she began singing at her parents' restaurant for tips. Between taking orders and serving customers, Tucker recalled that she "would stand up in the narrow space by the door and sing with all the drama I could put into it. At the end of the last chorus, between me and the onions, there wasn't a dry eye in the place."

In 1903, around the age of 17, Tucker eloped with Louis Tuck, a beer cart driver, from whom she later derived her professional surname. When she returned home, her parents arranged an Orthodox wedding for the couple. She became pregnant almost immediately after being married. In 1905, she gave birth to a son, Albert. However, shortly after Albert was born, the couple separated, and Tucker left the baby with her family and moved to New York City.

== Career ==
After Tucker left her husband, Willie Howard gave her a letter of recommendation to Harold Von Tilzer, a composer and theatrical producer in New York. When it failed to bring her work, Tucker found jobs in cafés and beer gardens, singing for food and tips from the customers. She sent most of what she made back home to Connecticut to support her son and family.

=== Stage ===
In 1907, Tucker made her first theater appearance, singing at an amateur night in a vaudeville establishment. The producers thought that the crowd would tease her for being "so big and ugly." Early in her career, Tucker appeared in blackface as a minstrel singer, but she disliked this work and would sabotage the act by revealing that she was white at the end of the show, first removing a glove to reveal her white hand, then by pulling off her wig and exposing her blonde hair. Tucker also began integrating "fat girl" humor, which became a common thread in her acts. Her songs included "I Don't Want to Get Thin" and "Nobody Loves a Fat Girl, But Oh How a Fat Girl Can Love."

"Some of These Days" recorded by Tucker in 1911 on wax cylinder

In 1909, Tucker performed with the Ziegfeld Follies. Though she was a hit, the other female stars refused to share the spotlight with her, and the company was forced to let her go. This caught the attention of William Morris, a theater owner and future founder of the William Morris Agency. Two years later, Tucker released "Some of These Days" on Edison Records, written by Shelton Brooks. The title of the song was used as the title of Tucker's 1945 biography.

In 1921, Tucker hired pianist and songwriter Ted Shapiro as her accompanist and musical director, a position he would keep throughout her career. Besides writing a number of songs for her, Shapiro became part of her stage act, playing piano on stage while she sang, and exchanging banter and wisecracks with her in between numbers. Tucker remained a popular singer through the 1920s and became friends with stars such as Mamie Smith and Ethel Waters, who introduced her to jazz. Tucker learned from these women and became one of the early performers to introduce jazz to white vaudeville audiences.

Also in 1921, Nathan Handwerker named his previously unnamed hot dog stand Nathan's Hot Dogs in 1921 after Tucker, then a singer at the nearby Carey Walsh's Cafe, made a hit of the song "Nathan, Nathan, Why You Waitin?"

In 1925, Jack Yellen wrote "My Yiddishe Momme", a song which became strongly identified with her and was performed in cities which had a significant Jewish audience. Tucker said: "Even though I loved the song and it was a sensational hit every time I sang it, I was always careful to use it only when I knew the majority of the house would understand Yiddish. However, you didn't have to be a Jew to be moved by 'My Yiddishe Momme'." The song was banned in Nazi Germany.

=== Popularity ===
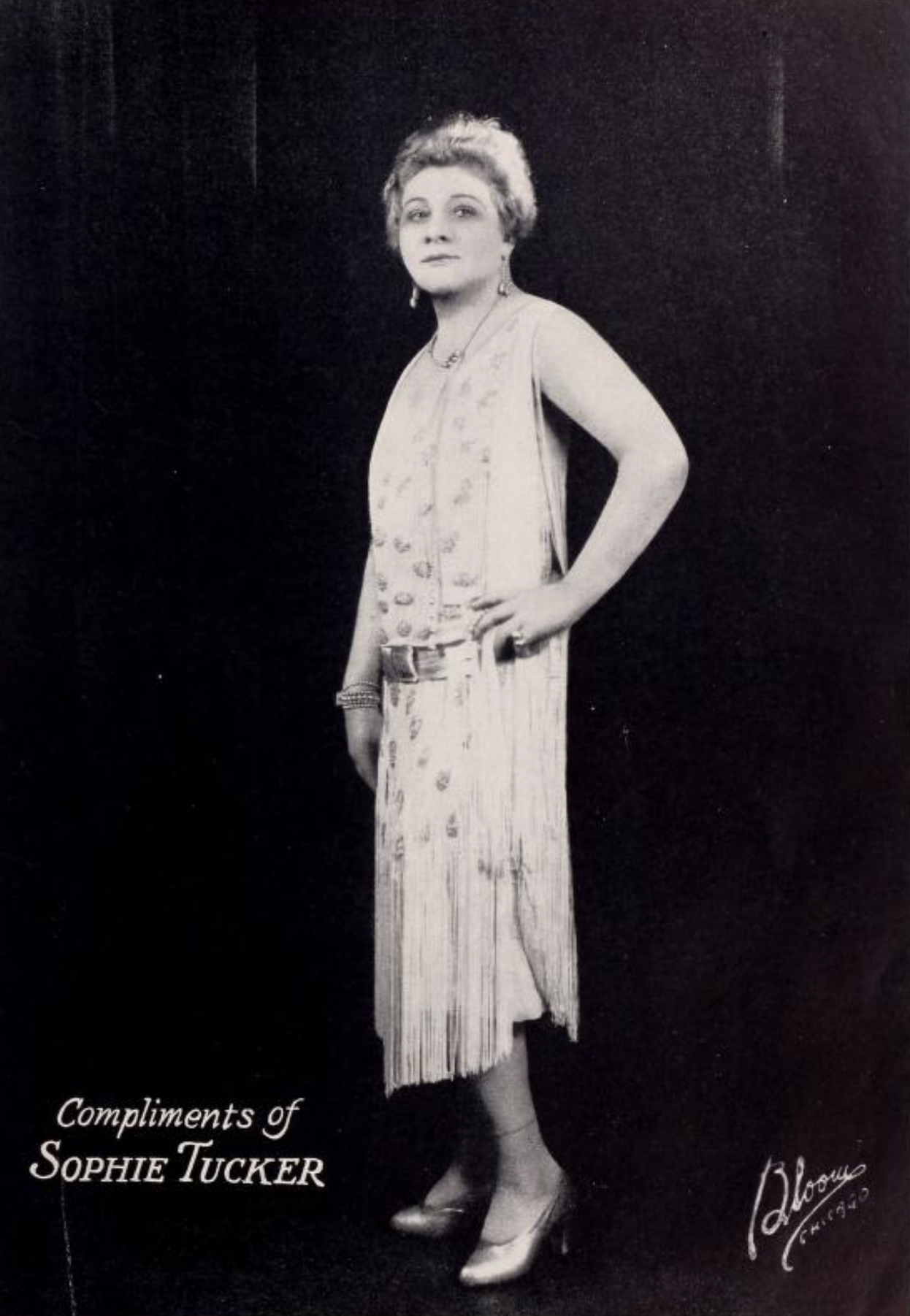
Tucker in 1928

By the 1920s, Tucker's success had spread to Europe, and she began a tour of England, performing for King George V and Queen Mary at the London Palladium in 1926. Tucker re-released her hit song "Some of These Days", backed by Ted Lewis and his band, which stayed at the No. 1 position of the charts for five weeks beginning November 23, 1926. It sold more than one million copies and was awarded a gold disc by the RIAA.

Tucker was strongly affected by the decline of vaudeville. Speaking about performing in the final show at E.F. Albee's Palace Theater in New York City, she remarked "Everyone knew the theater was to be closed down, and a landmark in show business would be gone. That feeling got into the acts. The whole place, even the performers, stank of decay. I seemed to smell it. It challenged me. I was determined to give the audience the idea: Why brood over yesterday? We have tomorrow. As I sang, I could feel the atmosphere change. The gloom began to lift, the spirit which formerly filled the Palace and which made it famous among vaudeville houses the world over came back. That's what an entertainer can do."

My Pet sung by Sophie Tucker in 1928 with the Ted Shapiro Orchestra

In 1929, she made her first movie appearance in Honky Tonk. During the 1930s, Tucker brought elements of nostalgia for the early years of the 20th century into her show. She was billed as "the Last of the Red Hot Mamas" as her hearty sexual appetite was a frequent subject of her songs, unusual for female performers of the day after the decline of vaudeville.

The cartoon The Woods Are Full of Cuckoos caricatures Tucker as Sophie Turkey.

=== American Federation of Actors ===
In 1938, Tucker was elected president of the American Federation of Actors, an early actors' trade union. Originally formed for vaudeville and circus performers, the union expanded to include nightclub performers and was chartered as a branch of the Associated Actors and Artistes.

In 1939, the union was disbanded by the American Federation of Labor (AFL) for financial mismanagement. However, Tucker was not implicated in the proceedings. The AFL later issued a charter for the succeeding American Guild of Variety Artists, which remains active.

=== Later days ===
In 1938-39, Tucker had her own radio show, The Roi Tan Program with Sophie Tucker, broadcast on CBS for 15 minutes on Monday, Wednesday, and Friday. She made numerous guest appearances on such programs as The Radio Hall of Fame and The Andrews Sisters' Show: Eight-to-the-Bar Ranch hosted by the Andrews Sisters. In the 1950s and early 1960s Tucker, "the First Lady of Show Business", made frequent television appearances on many popular variety and talk shows of the day such as The Ed Sullivan Show and The Tonight Show. She remained popular abroad, performing for fanatical crowds in the music halls of London. On April 13, 1963, a Broadway musical titled Sophie, based on Tucker's early life until 1922, opened with Libi Staiger as the lead. It closed after eight performances.

Tucker continued to perform for the rest of her life. In 1962, she performed in the Royal Variety Performance, which was broadcast on the BBC. She appeared on the Ed Sullivan Show on October 3, 1965. For the color broadcast, her last television appearance, she performed "Give My Regards to Broadway", "Louise", and her signature song, "Some of These Days".

== Personal life ==
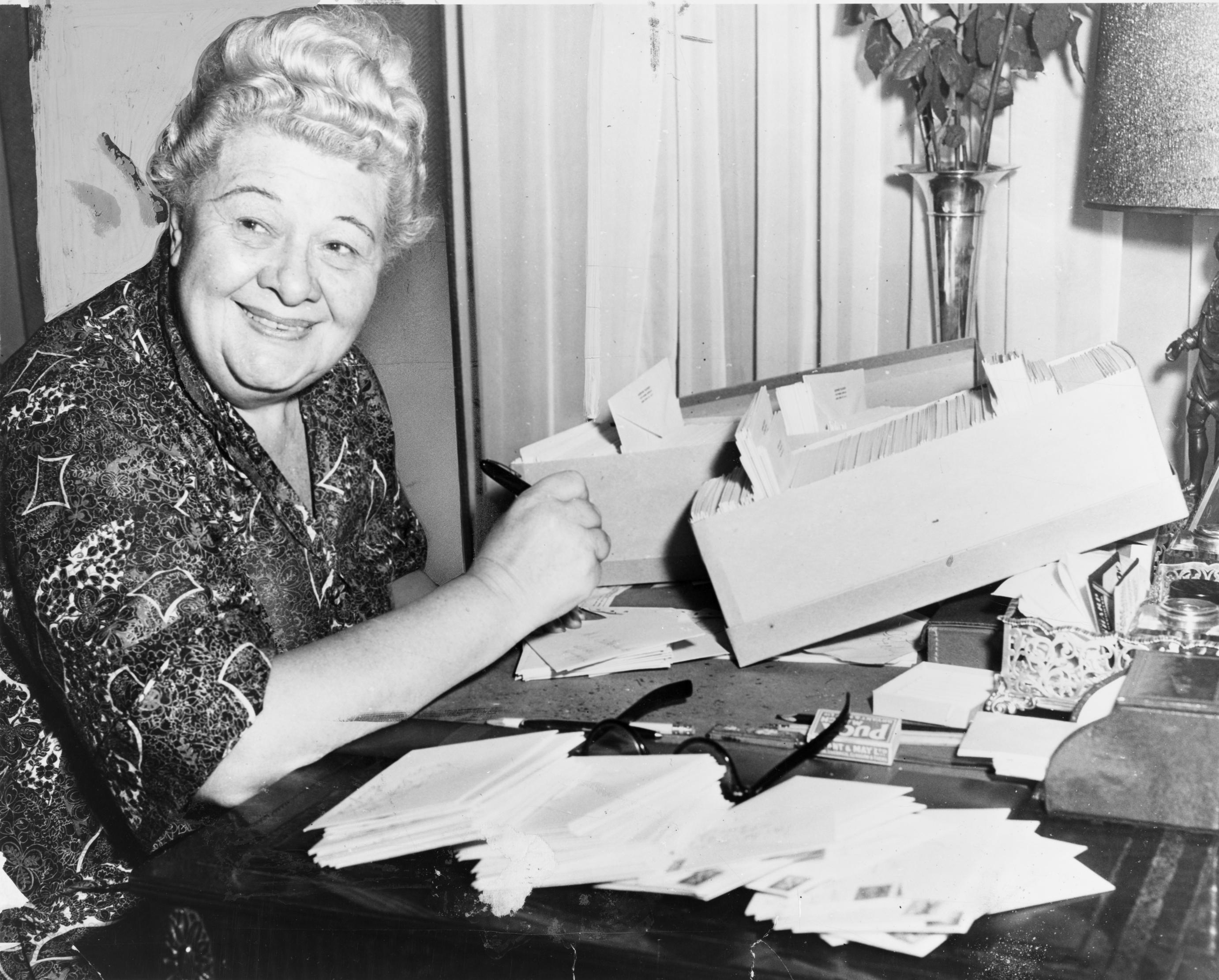
Tucker in 1952

Tucker was married three times. Her first marriage was to Louis Tuck, a beer cart driver, with whom she eloped in 1903. The marriage produced Tucker's only child, Albert. In 1906 the couple separated, and Tucker left Albert with her family, supporting them with money from her singing jobs in New York. They were divorced in May 1913. Albert was raised by his maternal aunt, Annie. Annie and Sophie had a close relationship and kept in touch with weekly letters.

Her second marriage to her accompanist Frank Westphal (from 1917 to 1920) and her third marriage to her manager Al Lackey from 1928 to 1934 both ended in divorce and produced no children. She blamed the failure of her marriages on her being too adjusted to economic independence. She said "Once you start carrying your own suitcase, paying your own bills, running your own show, you've done something to yourself that makes you one of those women men like to call 'a pal' and 'a good sport,' the kind of woman they tell their troubles to. But you've cut yourself off from the orchids and the diamond bracelets except those you buy yourself."

Tucker died of lung cancer and kidney failure on February 9, 1966, at age 80 in her Park Avenue apartment. She continued working until her death, playing shows at the Latin Quarter just weeks before. Tucker is buried in Emanuel Cemetery in Wethersfield, Connecticut.

== Works ==
=== Theatre ===
- Ziegfeld Follies of 1909 (1909) (Broadway)
- Lulu’s Husbands (1910) (Broadway)
- Louisiana Lou (1911–1912) (Chicago and U.S. national tour)
- Hello, Alexander (1919) (Broadway)
- Tick-Tack-Toe (1920) (Broadway and U.S. national tour)
- Earl Carroll's Vanities of 1924 (1924) (Broadway)
- Follow a Star (1930) (London and U.K. national tour)
- Leave It to Me! (1938-1940) (Broadway and U.S. national tour)
- High Kickers (1941–1942) (Broadway and U.S. national tour)

=== Film ===
- Honky Tonk (1929)
- Gay Love (1934)
- Paramount Headliner: Broadway Highlights No. 1 (1935, short subject)
- Broadway Melody of 1938 (1937) as Alice Clayton
- Thoroughbreds Don't Cry (1937)
- Follow the Boys (1944)
- Sensations of 1945 (1944)
- Screen Snapshots: The Great Showman (1950, short subject)
- Screen Snapshots: Hollywood's Great Entertainers (1953, short subject)
- The Heart of Show Business (1957, short subject)
- The Joker Is Wild (1957)

=== Radio ===
- Desert Island Discs, BBC radio (September 2, 1963)

=== Popular Recordings ===
- "That Lovin' Rag" (1910)
- "That Lovin' Two-Step Mam" (1910)
- "That Loving Soul Kiss" (1911)
- "Some of These Days" (1911)
- "Knock Wood" (1912)
- "High Brown Blues" (1922)
- "You've Gotta See Mama Ev'ry Night (Or You Can't See Mama At All)" (1923)
- "Red Hot Mama" (1924)
- "My Yiddishe Momme (1928)
- "Life Begins at Forty", by Jack Yellen and Ted Shapiro, recorded by Tucker in 1937.

=== Compilations ===
- Greatest Hits (1967) (Decca DL 4942)
- Sophie Tucker: Origins of the Red Hot Mama, 1910–1922 (Archeophone, 2009)

== Influences ==
Tucker's comic and singing styles are credited with influencing later female entertainers, including Mae West, Rusty Warren, Carol Channing, Totie Fields, Joan Rivers, Roseanne Barr, Ethel Merman, "Mama" Cass Elliot of the Mamas & the Papas, and Bette Midler, whose stage character Soph is a tribute to Tucker. She also influenced Miami-based radio and television host-come-singer Peppy Fields, sister of noted pianist Irving Fields, whom Variety and Billboard magazines called the "Sophie Tucker of Miami".

Probably the greatest influence on Tucker's later song delivery was Clarice Vance (1870–1961). They appeared many times on the same vaudeville bill. Sophie made her first recordings in 1910, and Clarice made her final records in 1909. Clarice had perfected and was known for her subtle narrative talk-singing style that Sophie later used to her advantage when her vocal range became increasingly limited. At the time that Clarice Vance was using the narrative style, it was unique to her among women entertainers.

== Legacy ==
Tucker is briefly mentioned in the lyrics of the song "Roxie" from the musical Chicago ("And Sophie Tucker'll shit I know/To see her name get billed below/Foxy Roxie Hart") and was cited as the main influence for the character Matron "Mama" Morton.

A popular music revue, Sophie Tucker: The Last of the Red Hot Mamas, developed by Florida Studio Theatre (FST) in Sarasota, Florida, celebrates Tucker's brassy and bawdy behavior, songs, and persona. Developed in-house by artistic director Richard Hopkins in 2000, it has enjoyed several productions across the country, including theatres in New York City, Chicago, Atlanta, and Toronto. Kathy Halenda, who originated the role of Tucker in the production, returned to FST for a limited engagement of The Last of the Red Hot Mamas in March 2012.

William Gazecki produced the 2014 documentary The Outrageous Sophie Tucker.

During the Beatles' appearance at the Royal Variety Performance on November 4, 1963, Paul McCartney introduced the song "Till There Was You" as having been recorded "by our favourite American group, Sophie Tucker." McCartney likewise introduced the song "I Want to Hold Your Hand" on The Ed Sullivan Show on February 16, 1964 in the same manner.
