= Honky Tonk (1929 film) =

1929 film

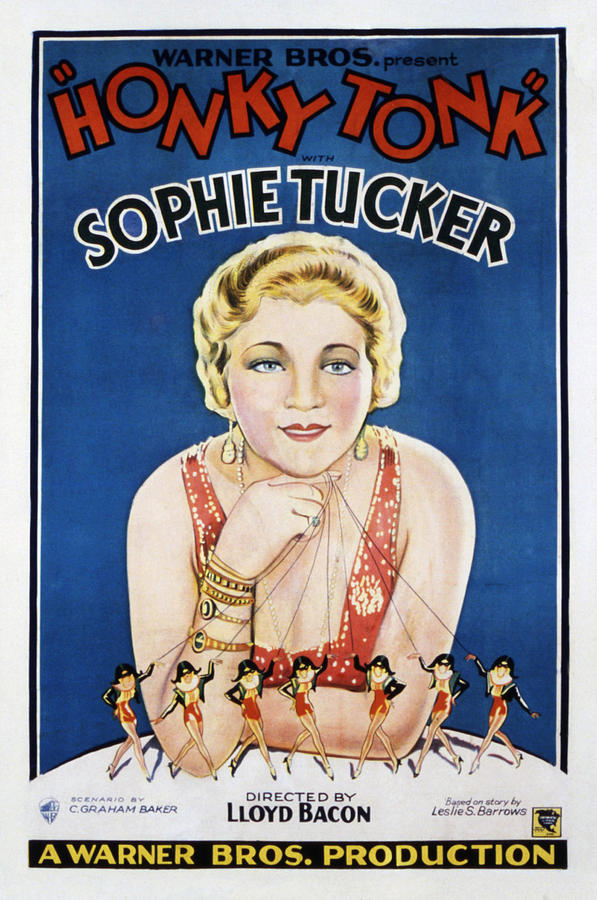
- Theatrical film poster
- Directed by: Lloyd Bacon
- Written by: C. Graham Baker; Jack Yellen
- Starring: Sophie Tucker
- Cinematography: Ben F. Reynolds
- Music by: Alois Reiser
- Production company: Warner Bros. Pictures
- Distributed by: Warner Bros. Pictures
- Release date: August 31, 1929; (limited release)
- Running time: 71 minutes
- Country: United States
- Language: English
- Budget: $251,000
- Box office: $650,000

Honky Tonk is a 1929 American sound (All-Talking) Pre-Code musical film directed by Lloyd Bacon and starring Sophie Tucker in her film debut. The film was a flop when released and is now lost, although the Vitaphone soundtrack for the film and for the trailer still exists. Tucker sings a number of songs in the movie, including her theme song "Some of These Days", and "I'm the Last of the Red Hot Mamas", from which she took her billing as "The Last of the Red Hot Mamas".

== Plot ==
Sophie Leonard is a nightclub singer at the Honky Tonk, performing her popular “hot mamma” songs. One evening, she grows angry at the offensive familiarity of Freddie Gilmore, the son of the head of a major chain-store organization, who is part of a wild group of intoxicated college boys out for a night of fun. Sophie orders Freddie to be ejected from the club.

Sophie's entire world revolves around her daughter Beth, who has been attending school in Europe for several years. Beth believes her mother to be a concert singer of considerable means, completely unaware that Sophie has sacrificed and saved by working in such clubs to pay for her daughter's education.

On the day of Beth's early return, Sophie's modest flat has been decorated lavishly with flowers and a special dinner prepared. Sophie and Jim Blaken, who lives in the same building and is a close friend, prepare to go meet the boat bringing Beth home. However, Beth arrives an hour ahead of schedule, driving up in a luxurious limousine accompanied by Jean Gilmore, a school companion and the sister of Freddie Gilmore.

Beth is shocked and disappointed to see the humble state of Sophie's home, and Jean is openly contemptuous of Sophie's modest surroundings. Sophie learns that Beth is to attend a party that evening, arranged by Freddie. Sophie, distressed by the prospect, prepares to meet her daughter but ends up eating alone with Jim.

At four o’clock in the morning, Sophie sees Beth arrive home with Freddie and witness them share a kiss. She commands Beth not to see Freddie again, but Beth receives her mother's admonitions with impatience, even criticizing the quality of the home Sophie has worked so hard to provide.

Later, Jim comes into the flat, and Sophie confides in him her conflicted feelings — though she hates the café life, she now hates her home even more and decides to return to the Honky Tonk the very next night.

Angered by Sophie's treatment of him, Freddie takes revenge by bringing Beth to the Honky Tonk to witness the kind of work her mother does. Beth is aghast and humiliated. She confronts Sophie harshly and moves out to a hotel, leaving a note behind saying she can never forgive her mother.

Beth phones Freddie the next morning, but before he can visit her, Jim calls him. After their conversation, Freddie comes to Beth and declares he will not marry her unless he has Sophie's permission. Hurt and surprised, Beth accompanies Freddie to Sophie's flat to ask for the blessing.

However, before they can reach Sophie, Jim intercepts them and rebukes Beth for her ingratitude and cruelty toward her mother. His words soften Beth, and she begins to regret her harsh judgment.

Sophie is overjoyed by the change in her daughter's attitude and realizes that Beth still loves Freddie. Recognizing Freddie's worth, Sophie arranges a meeting between the lovers. Beth accompanies her mother to the café, where everything is resolved to Beth's surprise.

One year later, Sophie Leonard is a proud grandmother, shown happily caring for Beth, Freddie, and their baby — a testament to Sophie's sacrifices and the love holding their family together.

== Cast ==
- Sophie Tucker as Sophie Leonard
- Lila Lee as Beth, Sophie Daughter
- Wilbur Mack as Stuttering Valet
- Audrey Ferris as Jean Gilmore
- Tom Keene as Freddie Gilmore
- Mahlon Hamilton as Jim Blaken
- John T. Murray as Cafe Manager

== Reception ==
According to Warner Bros the film earned $448,000 domestically and $202,000 foreign.

== Musical numbers ==
- "I'm Doing What I'm Doing for Love" (Milton Ager, Jack Yellen)
- "He's a Good Man To Have Around" (Ager, Yellen)
- "I'm Feathering a Nest (For a Little Blue Bird)" (Ager, Yellen)
- "I'm the Last of the Red Hot Mamas" (Ager, Yellen)
- "I Don't Want To Get Thin" (Ager, Yellen)
- "Some of These Days" (Shelton Brooks)

== See also ==
- List of early sound feature films (1926–1929)
- List of incomplete or partially lost films
