= TSX Broadway =

Skyscraper in Manhattan, New York

The Square
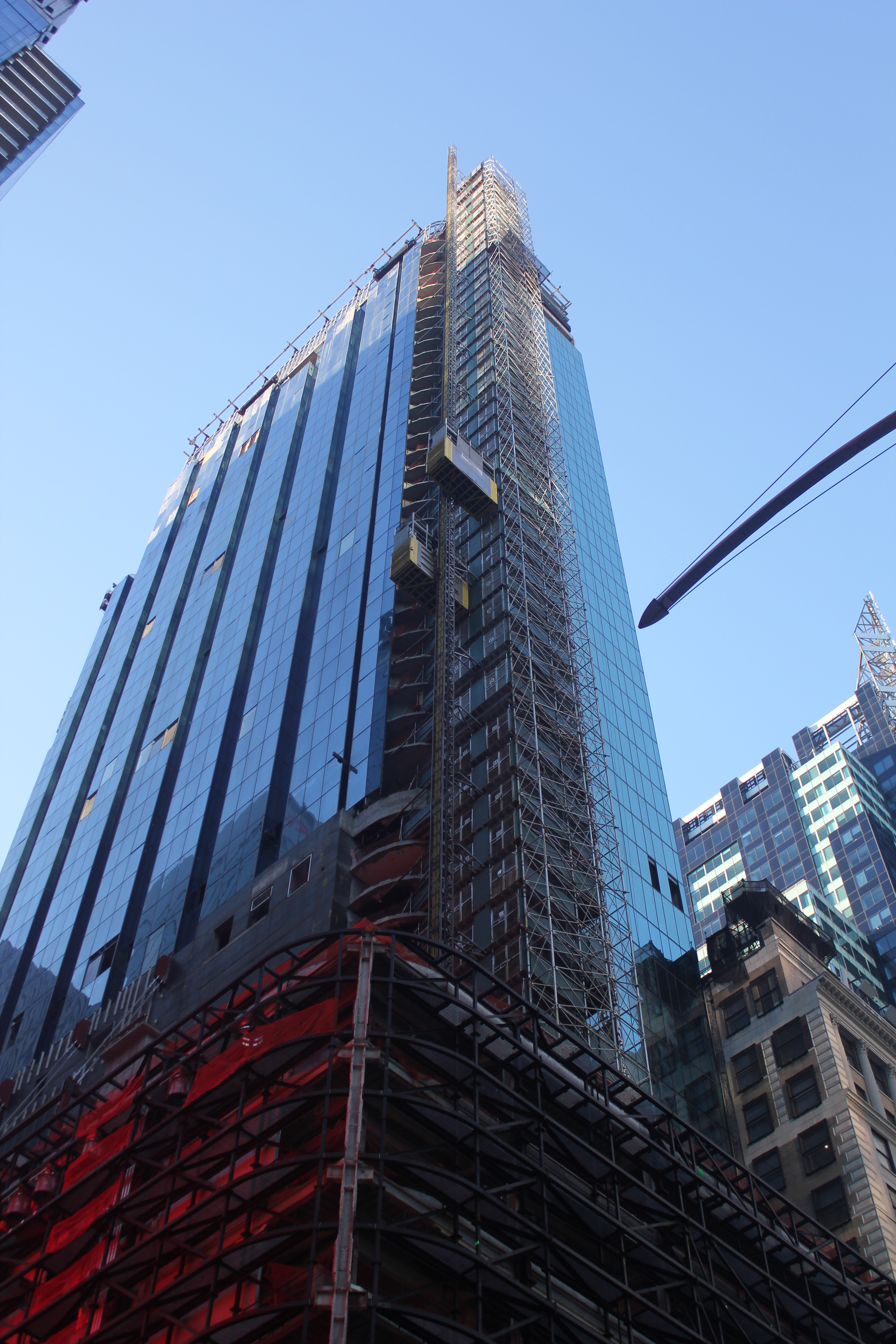
- Seen in September 2022
- Interactive map of the The Square area

General information
- Status: Completed
- Type: Mixed-use (hotel, retail, theater)
- Location: 1568 Broadway, Manhattan, New York, United States
- Coordinates: 40.759000°N 73.984523°W
- Construction started: 2019 (partial demolition of the old structure)
- Completed: 2024
- Cost: $2.5 billion

Technical details
- Floor area: 500,000 square feet (46,000 m^{2})

Website
- http://thesquareny.com/

The Square, formerly known as TSX Broadway, is a 46-story mixed-use building on Times Square, at the southeastern corner of Broadway and 47th Street, in Midtown Manhattan, New York City. Developed by L&L Holding, the building includes a 669-room hotel, multi-story retail space, and an existing landmarked Broadway theater called the Palace Theatre. The Square development involved the reconstruction of a DoubleTree hotel that was completed in 1991, as well as the lifting of the Palace Theatre at the former hotel's base. The framework of the hotel's first 16 stories remains largely intact, but the upper floors have been demolished. Work on the new structure began in 2019, and the building was completed in 2024.

== History ==
=== Background ===
The Square replaced an Embassy Suites hotel (later a DoubleTree Suites), designed by Fox & Fowle, which was built above the Palace Theatre between 1987 and 1991. Developer Larry Silverstein had planned to build a skyscraper on the Palace Theater's site since the mid-1980s. Such a development was contingent on his ability to acquire a Bowery Savings Bank branch at the corner of 47th Street and Seventh Avenue, surrounded by the original Palace Theatre building. The New York City Landmarks Preservation Commission (LPC) designated the theater as an interior landmark in 1987, forcing Silverstein to build around the theater. The theater's old office wing on Seventh Avenue was demolished (except for the lobby), as were two stories above the auditorium and two ancillary structures. Silverstein developed a 43-story Embassy Suites hotel on the site. The theater received a $1.5 million renovation as part of the $150 million hotel project. The hotel was completed in September 1990.

In 2015, the Nederlander Organization (which operated the Palace Theatre) and Maefield Development announced another renovation in conjunction with a new development on the DoubleTree site. The theater would be renovated, and its auditorium would be raised 30 feet (9.1 m) to accommodate ground-floor retail spaces. The LPC approved the plan in November 2015, even as many preservationists expressed concern over the idea. Maefield filed permits for the project in mid-2016. The New York City Council approved the plan in June 2018, allowing the redevelopment to proceed.

=== Construction ===
L&L Holding Company, Maefield Development, and Fortress Investment Group announced in September 2018 that the construction of The Square would start in early 2019. The developers received $780 million of funding from a syndicate led by UBS, a $1.25 billion construction loan from Goldman Sachs, and a $494 million investment pool from foreign investors through the EB-5 visa program. Construction started in March 2019 with the demolition of floors above the 16th floor. The renovation was delayed during 2019 because the contractors needed to inspect an adjacent building, but the property's owners did not grant permission for the inspection for over a year.

The old 1568 Broadway building was being demolished by early 2020. Work was only interrupted for three weeks during the COVID-19 pandemic in New York City, as The Square project had hotel rooms and was thus classified as an "essential jobsite". Construction of The Square's superstructure began the next year, and the Palace Theatre was raised from January to April 2022. Hilton Hotels & Resorts announced in September 2022 that it would operate the hotel at The Square, which would be the first hotel in the Tempo by Hilton brand.

==== Lifting the Palace Theatre ====
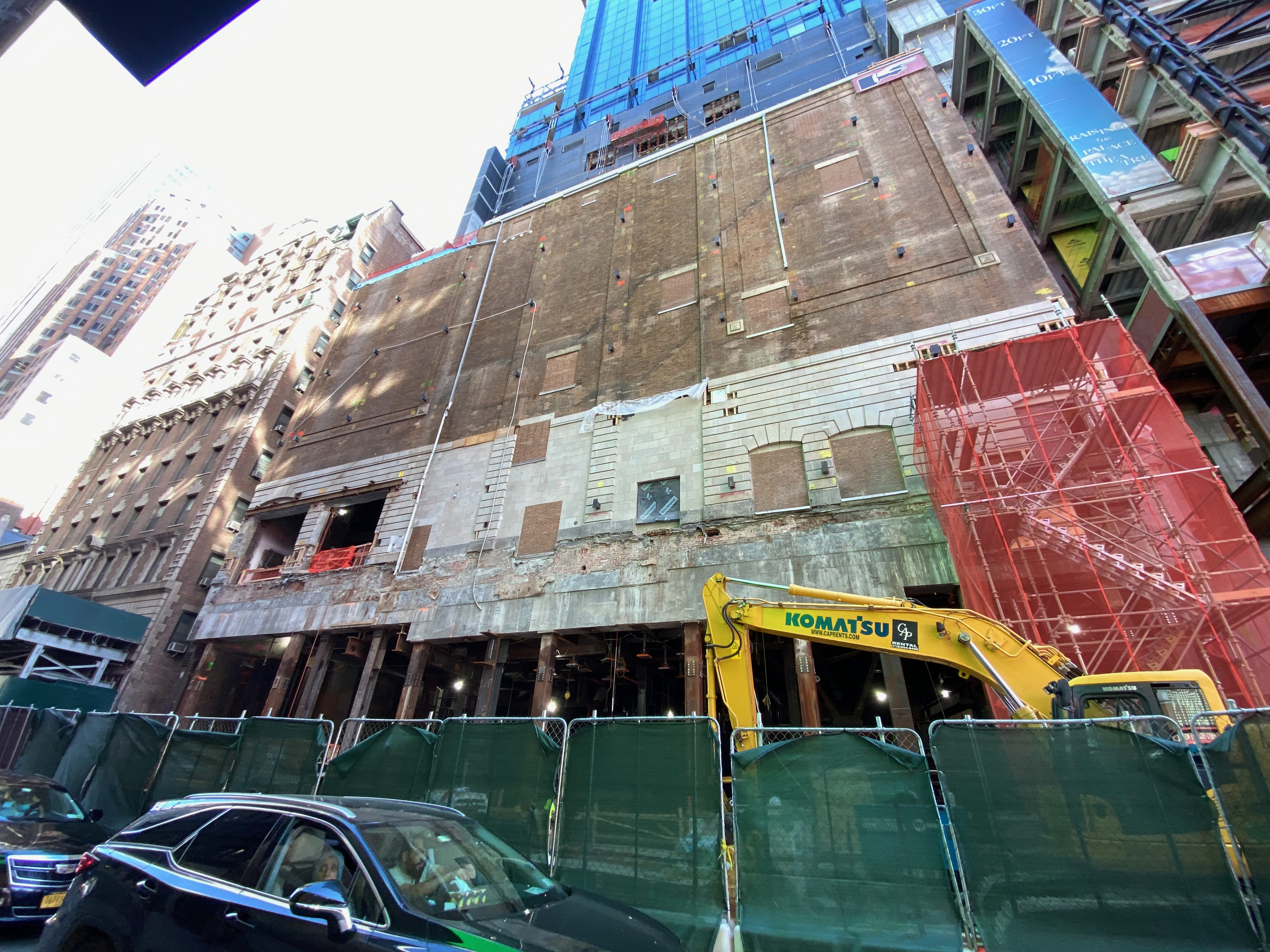
Construction in May 2022 after the Palace Theatre was raised to its final height 30 feet off the ground

When construction started in 2016, the super columns of the building were extended to the 16th floor. A multi-story super-truss structure hanging on the extended super columns were built along the top floors up to the 16th floor to support the new floors above it. New columns were built to hang from the new super-truss to support all lower floors above the theater. As no loads were no longer applied to the original superstructure right above the theater's ceiling, the old superstructure was removed. A partial demolition of the slabs of the ground to 16th floors was done to meet the amount required by the codes on retaining slabs. After that, a subcellar was constructed by removing the theater's old foundation, creating the new foundation, and installing 34 hydraulically controlled steel posts to be ready for lifting the theater.

The Palace Theatre's auditorium was raised starting in January 2022. After the theater had been raised 16 or 17 feet (4.9 or 5.2 m), in March 2022, the lifting process was temporarily paused while the new structural frame was installed. The lifting process was completed on April 5, 2022, though the formal celebration was held the next month. Afterward, the permanent supports under the auditorium were installed. At the time, The Square was planned to be completed in 2023.

=== Completion ===
The LED screen on the building's facade was illuminated for the first time in January 2023. Members of the public were allowed to buy 15-second advertisement slots on the screen for $40 each. The screen quickly attracted attention from VTubers and social-media users in China, among others, who bought up advertisement slots there. Post Malone hosted the first concert on The Square's outdoor terrace in July 2023.

In June 2023, it was reported that The Square property was scheduled to open in the first quarter of 2024. The Tempo by Hilton hotel opened on August 9, 2023, and the building was ultimately completed in mid-2024. Goldman Sachs and the building's other lenders took over The Square in August 2024 after L&L Holding and Fortress Investment defaulted on a $1.13 billion loan that had been placed on the building. The United States Immigration Fund (USIF) filed a lawsuit over this takeover in February 2026, claiming that L&L and Fortress owed $890 million because they had given up ownership without USIF's permission.

== Architecture ==
The owners hired Mancini Duffy as the architect of record to coordinate the entire project. Platt Byard Dovell White was hired to redesign the Palace Theatre's interior, and Perkins Eastman designed the exterior. The structure includes a 669-room hotel, which was built around, above, and below the Palace Theatre's auditorium. Due to modifications in New York City's zoning regulations, the DoubleTree Hotel exceeded the maximum floor area ratio (FAR) allowed for the site. However, zoning regulations allow new developments to contain the same amount of floor space as their predecessors, ignoring FAR limits, if the new building retains 25 percent of the original structure.

To meet city building codes, the new structure retains the lowest 16 stories of the DoubleTree structure, with new concrete slabs being poured around the old ones. The ground-floor areas is being replaced with retail space, extending three levels below ground. This requires the auditorium to be raised by about 30 feet (9.1 m). The new development includes about 51,000 square feet (4,700 m^{2}) of exterior LED signage stretching from the base to the roof of the building. The structure was to be enlarged from 483 to 533 feet (147 to 162 m).

The original plans, filed in 2016, called for the basements and first ten stories to contain the Palace Theatre, as well as entertainment spaces and retail. The 10th floor was to contain two balconies and a restaurant, while the hotel's lobby was to be on the 11th floor. The new ground-story space includes 4,000 square feet (370 m^{2}) of outdoor entertainment space and 75,000 square feet (7,000 m^{2}) of retail. In addition, about 10,000 square feet (930 m^{2}) of back of house space was created for the Palace Theatre. In total, the theater was expanded from 40,000 to 80,000 square feet (3,700 to 7,400 m^{2}). The hotel rooms extend to the 45th floor, and a mechanical space is located on the 46th floor.

== Sources ==
- Harriman, Marc S. (November 1991). "Spanning History" (PDF). Architecture. pp. 107–109.
