= Some of These Days =

1910 popular song composed by Shelton Brooks

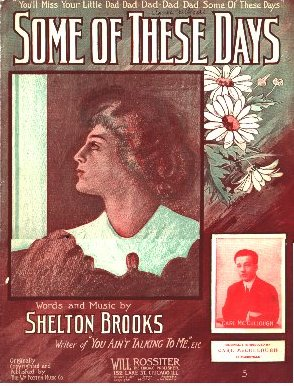
- 1910 sheet music cover

Song by Sophie Tucker
- Published: 1910 by Will Rossiter
- Genre: Jazz standard
- Songwriter: Shelton Brooks

"Some of These Days" is a popular song, written and composed by Shelton Brooks, published in 1910, and associated with the performer Sophie Tucker.

== Background ==
Shelton Brooks and "Some of These Days" was brought to Sophie Tucker's attention in 1910 by her maid, who insisted she meet Brooks and hear the song. Tucker instantly recognized its hit potential, performed and recorded many versions throughout the years, and eventually it became her signature song—including landing movie appearances to perform it.

Tucker first recorded the song along with others on wax cylinder format in 1910–11. In 1926, on 78 RPM record format and backed by Ted Lewis and his band, Tucker recorded her classic, million-selling 1926 version, which stayed in the #1 position on the charts for five weeks beginning November 23, 1926, and re-affirmed her lasting association with the song.

"Some of These Days" has been recorded by many other artists, including Billy "Uke" Carpenter, Ethel Waters, Louis Armstrong, Coco Briaval, Elkie Brooks, Cab Calloway, Bing Crosby, Bobby Darin, Ella Fitzgerald, Diahann Carroll, Brenda Lee, Danny Aiello, Judy Garland, Matt Forbes, The Hot Sardines, Susan Maughan, The McGuire Sisters, the Original Dixieland Jass Band, Sue Raney, Serena Ryder, Sidney Bechet, Leon Redbone, Mora & Bronski, Coon-Sanders Nighthawks and Erica Lewis with the band Tuba Skinny.

Some of These Days recorded by Sophie Tucker in 1911 on wax cylinder

== Appearances in film ==
"Some of These Days" made the first of many movie soundtrack appearances in Lights of New York (1928), the first "all talking" motion picture, being one of several songs played by the house band of the nightclub where the film is set. Sophie Tucker herself sang "Some of These Days" in character as nightclub singer Sophie Leonard in the 1929 film Honky Tonk with reprise performances (as herself) in Broadway Melody of 1938 and Follow the Boys (1944).

Other films to feature the song include Scarface and Three on a Match (both 1932), both featuring actress Ann Dvorak dancing to the song: in Scarface the song is played in a nightclub by Gus Arnheim's band while Cesca Camonte (Dvorak) dances and in Three on a Match, Vivian Revere Kirkwood (Dvorak) dances while Jerry Carter (Harry Seymour) plays "Some of These Days" on a piano.

In Rose-Marie (1936), Marie de Flor (Jeanette MacDonald) attempts a lyric soprano rendition in a Klondike café whose regular vocalist Belle (Gilda Gray) upstages Marie with an earthy performance of the song. "Some of These Days" was also featured in the 1939 release Only Angels Have Wings in which Bonnie Lee (Jean Arthur) plays the song on the piano in a cantina.

Other soundtrack appearances of the song include:

- The song is performed in the 1930 Talkartoon Wise Flies by a spider with hat attempting to seduce a female fly. The spider's vocals are taken directly from a 1929 Eddie Peabody recording.
- The 1931 film An American Tragedy features a group of young adults singing the song while lounging in canoes on a lake. The song is performed with only a guitar, while percussions are used by tapping on the canoes and body of the guitar, while the trumpet parts are scatted by some of the crowd.
- The song is performed by Clyde (Slim Thompson) in 1939 movie Lying Lips.
- Audrey Paris (Leland Palmer), Katie Jagger (Ann Reinking) and Michelle Gideon (Erzsebet Foldi) perform the song in the 1979 film All That Jazz.
- Calloway's 1930 Brunswick recording appears on the soundtrack of Forbidden Zone (1980), with Oingo Boingo member Gene Cunningham in the role of Papa Hercules lip synching Calloway's vocals.
- The 2004 Bobby Darin biopic Beyond the Sea features the song over the end credits, performed by Kevin Spacey, who played Darin.
- In the 1920s-set HBO drama series Boardwalk Empire, the 1911 version of the song by Sophie Tucker is played in the 2010 pilot episode. In the ninth episode of the first season, "Belle Femme", Sophie Tucker appears as a character (played by Kathy Brier) in a cabaret show and sings the song.
- In the Mama's Family third season episode “Grandma USA” in 1987, Thelma Harper (Vicki Lawrence) sings the song during the talent portion of a beauty contest for grandmothers.
- In the White Collar fourth season episode "Empire City" in 2013, June Ellington (Diahann Carroll) sings the song during the finale.
- In the Pulang Araw second episode in 2024, Katy de la Cruz (Julie Anne San Jose) sings the song during a vaudeville performance.

== Appearances in fiction ==
- The song, or a particular recording of it, is a recurrent theme in Jean-Paul Sartre's 1938 novel Nausea.

== See also ==
- List of pre-1920 jazz standards
