= Palace Theatre (New York City) =

Broadway theater in Manhattan, New York

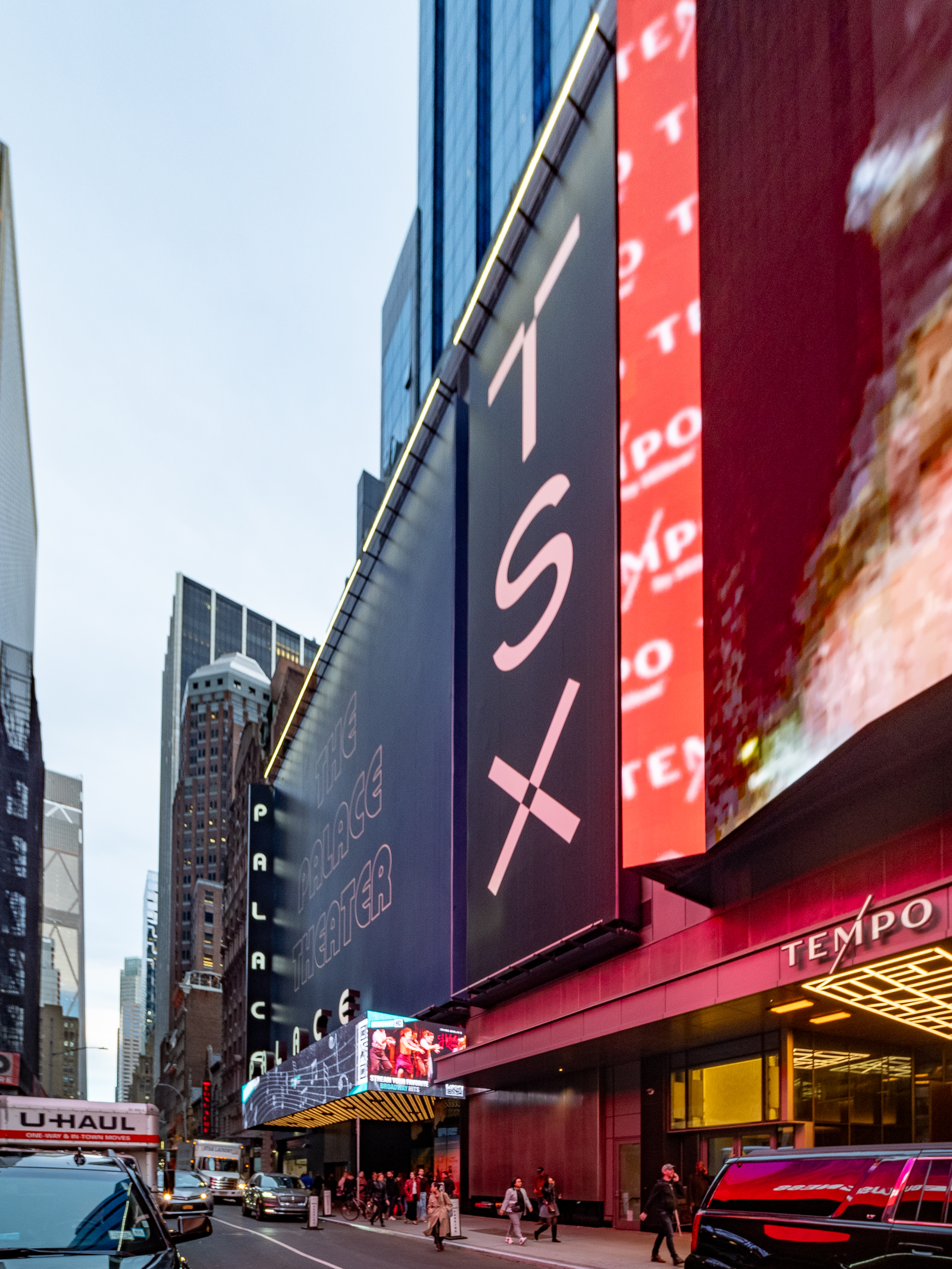
- Palace Theatre entrance within TSX Broadway, 2024
- Interactive map of Palace Theatre
- Address: 1564 Broadway; Manhattan, New York; United States
- Coordinates: 40°45′32″N 73°59′05″W
- Owner: Nederlander Organization and Stewart F. Lane
- Operator: Nederlander Organization
- Capacity: 1,648 (Note: This capacity is approximate and may vary depending on the show. Playbill gives a different figure of 1,610 seats.)
- Type: Broadway
- Production: The Lost Boys

Construction
- Opened: March 24, 1913 (113 years ago) (vaudeville); January 29, 1966 (60 years ago) (Broadway theater)
- Rebuilt: 1987–1991, 2018–2024
- Years active: 1913–1932 (vaudeville); 1932–1965 (movie palace); 1966–present (Broadway)
- Architect: Kirchhoff & Rose

Website
- broadwaydirect.com/venue/palace-theatre

New York City Landmark
- Designated: July 14, 1987
- Reference no.: 1367
- Designated entity: Auditorium interior

The Palace Theatre is a Broadway theater at 1564 Broadway, at the north end of Times Square, in the Midtown Manhattan neighborhood of New York City, New York, U.S. Designed by Milwaukee architects Kirchhoff & Rose, the theater was funded by Martin Beck and opened in 1913. From its opening to about 1929, the Palace was considered among vaudeville performers as the flagship venue of Benjamin Franklin Keith and Edward Franklin Albee II's organization. The theater had 1,648 seats across three levels as of 2018.

The modern Palace Theatre consists of a three-level auditorium at 47th Street, which is a New York City designated landmark. The auditorium contains ornately designed plasterwork, boxes on the side walls, and two balcony levels that slope downward toward the stage. When it opened, the theater was accompanied by an 11- or 12-story office wing facing Broadway, also designed by Kirchhoff & Rose.

The Palace was most successful as a vaudeville house in the 1910s and 1920s. Under RKO Theatres, it became a movie palace called the RKO Palace Theatre in the 1930s, though it continued to host intermittent vaudeville shows in the 1950s. The Nederlander Organization purchased the Palace in 1965 and reopened the venue as a Broadway theater the next year. The theater closed for an extensive renovation from 1987 to 1991, when the original building was partly demolished and replaced with the DoubleTree Suites Times Square Hotel; the theater was reopened within the DoubleTree in 1991. The DoubleTree Hotel was mostly demolished in 2019 to make way for the TSX Broadway development. As part of this project, the Palace closed again in 2018 and was lifted 30 feet (9.1 m) in early 2022. The renovation was completed in May 2024.

== Buildings ==
The Palace Theatre is at 1568 Broadway, at the southeast corner of Seventh Avenue and 47th Street, in the Theater District of Midtown Manhattan in New York City, New York, U.S. It faces Duffy Square, the northern end of Times Square. The theater's site abuts the I. Miller Building and Embassy Theatre to the south.

The Palace Theatre was designed by Milwaukee architects Kirchhoff & Rose and was completed in 1913. The theater was funded by Martin Beck, a vaudeville entrepreneur. The theater has been housed in three buildings over the years. While the interior space dates to the 1913 design by Kirchhoff & Rose, the original theater building was partly demolished in 1988 and the theater space was renovated inside the DoubleTree Suites Times Square Hotel, completed between 1990 and 1991. The DoubleTree Hotel was itself demolished in 2019 to make way for the TSX Broadway development.

=== Original building ===
The Palace Theatre was originally composed of an office wing along Times Square, as well as the theater wing on 47th Street that contained the auditorium. The original building's site was assembled from ten land lots at 1564–1566 Broadway and 156–170 West 47th Street, which were arranged in an "L" shape. The Broadway lots collectively measured 40 by 80 feet (12 by 24 m), while the 47th Street lots measured 137 by 100 feet (42 by 30 m). This structure was designed by Kirchhoff & Rose, with James J. F. Gavigan as an associate architect. The steelwork was constructed by the George A. Just Company.

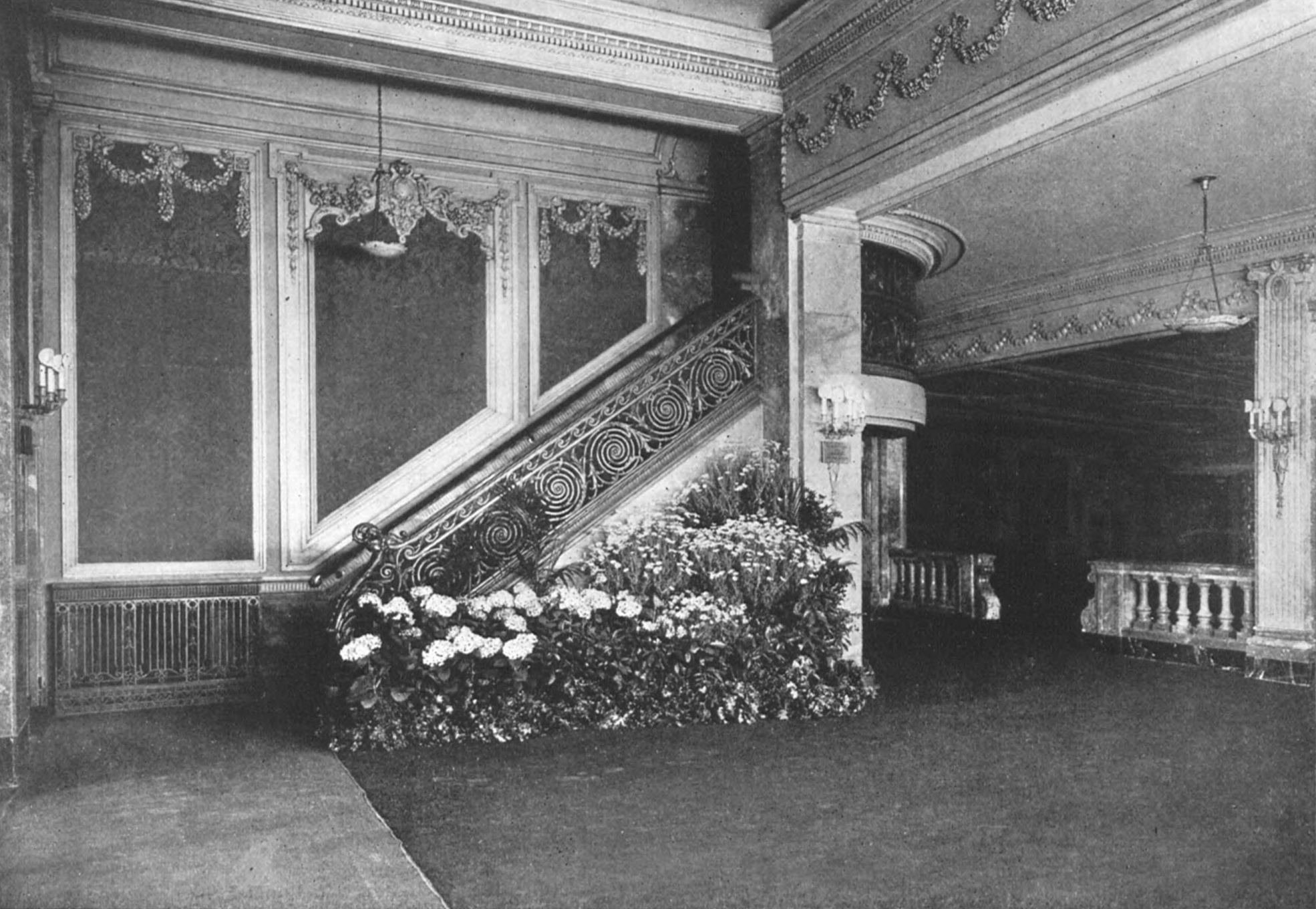
Original foyer

The office wing was an 11-story or 12-story structure, which served as the theater's main entrance. In the original building's later years, the entrance had a marquee. The office wing had an ornate marble facade, as well as two public elevators and a private one inside. The theater entrance was 40 feet (12 m) wide and contained an outer lobby with either Pavanazzo or yellow Carrara marble and a Siena-marble inner lobby. The lobbies were accessed by two sets of stained-glass, bronze-framed screen doors. There were stairs to the upper floors in the inner lobby. Past the two lobbies was a foyer that led directly to the auditorium (see Palace Theatre (New York City) § Auditorium).

The theater wing measured 88 by 125 feet (27 by 38 m). It had a brick or terracotta facade on 47th Street. The interior had French decorations. The auditorium originally had a seating capacity of 1,820, with double balcony levels and 20 boxes arranged in tiers. It was characterized as having an ivory-and-bronze color scheme. Five massive girders spanned the auditorium; each measured 86 feet (26 m) long and 8 feet (2.4 m) deep, weighing 30 short tons (27 long tons; 27 t). There were also 32 or 36 dressing rooms.

=== DoubleTree Suites ===
An Embassy Suites hotel (later a DoubleTree Suites), designed by Fox & Fowle, was built on the site between 1987 and 1991, replacing the office wing on Broadway. The hotel had 460 suites and was 43 stories tall. (Note: One source cited the hotel as being 44 stories tall.) The theater's facade was almost entirely hidden behind 10,000 square feet (930 m^{2}) of billboards for the first 120 feet (37 m) of the hotel's height, as per zoning regulations governing buildings on Times Square. The hotel leased the unused air rights above the Palace Theatre to achieve a greater height than would normally be allowed under zoning regulations. The hotel was placed above and around the theater's original auditorium and stage house. The hotel rooms were supported by four steel-and-concrete "super columns", which each measured 145 feet (44 m) tall and were placed to the west and east of the auditorium. Resting on the columns were two concrete-encased steel trusses, measuring 130 feet (40 m) long by 57 feet (17 m) tall and connected by 17 crossbeams.

The theater's lobby, as well as the hotel's entrance and some retail shops, were on the ground story. The entrance to the theater was at approximately the same location as in the original building, and the lobby from the old office wing was preserved. The theater lobby was divided into two sections leading into a foyer. Above that was a five-story atrium with some of the hotel's public spaces, which were placed between the beams, and 36 guestroom stories. A 12-foot-wide (3.7 m) emergency exit was preserved on the eastern side of the theater. Within the theater itself, mezzanine restrooms, an air-conditioning system, and an elevator to the second balcony were installed. Furthermore, the backstage facilities were enlarged. The Palace Theatre's original facade on 47th Street, consisting of rusticated limestone blocks at the first floor and brick on the upper stories, still remained but was not protected as a New York City landmark. The theater's lobby was also not protected as a landmark.

=== TSX Broadway ===
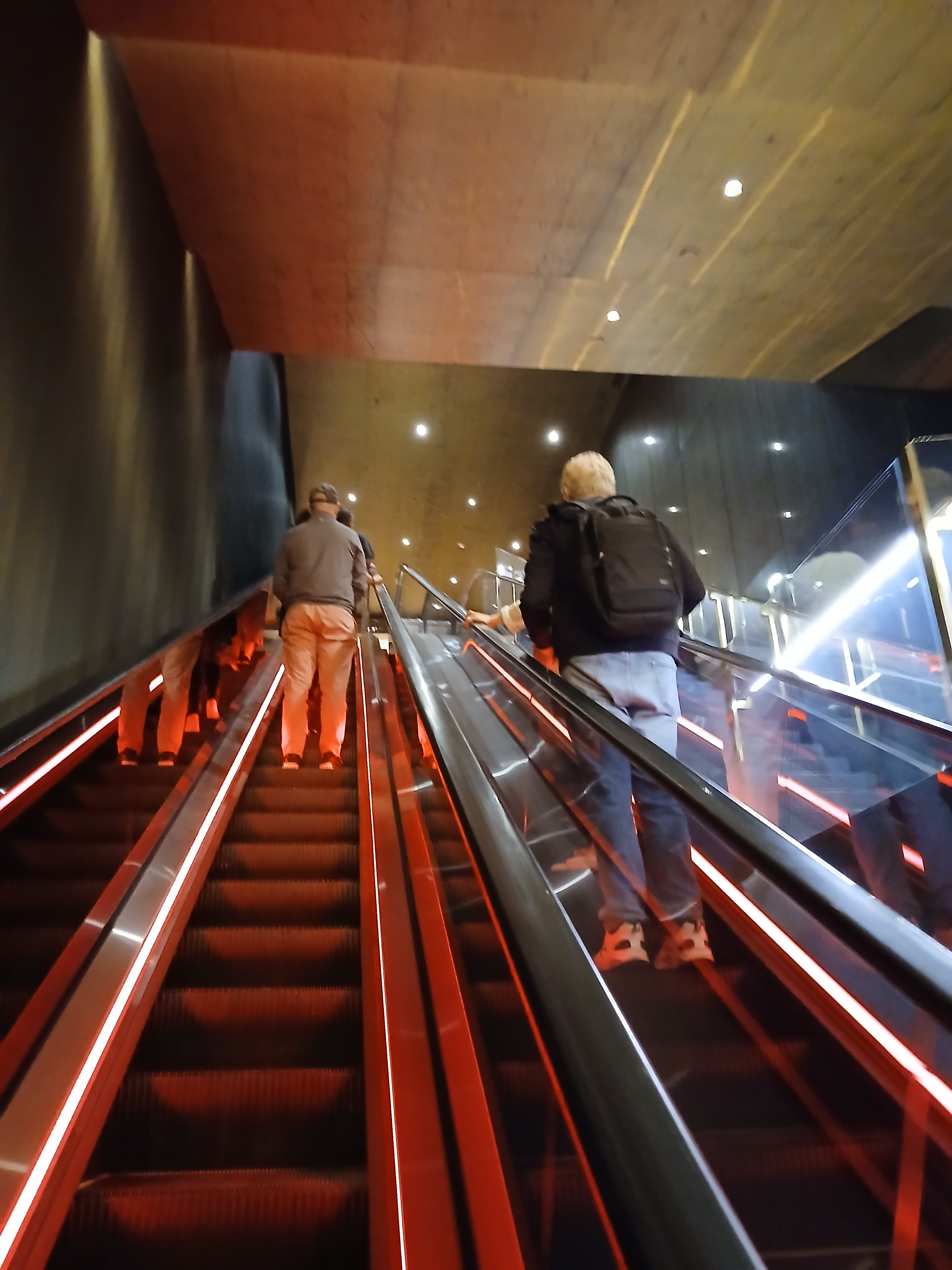
Escalators in TSX Broadway leading up from the ground level to the orchestra level

During the late 2010s and early 2020s, the DoubleTree/Palace site was redeveloped as part of TSX Broadway, a $2 billion mixed-use structure with a 669-room hotel, which was built around, above, and below the Palace's auditorium. The new structure retains the lowest 16 stories of the DoubleTree structure. The area occupied by the 1987 lobby was replaced with retail space, which would also extend three levels below ground. This required the auditorium to be raised by about 30 feet (9.1 m). (Note: Some sources cite the theater as being raised by 29 feet (8.8 m).) The auditorium is supported by columns that, in turn, rest on caissons extending 45 feet (14 m) deep.

About 10,000 square feet (930 m^{2}) of back of house space was created as part of the project. The main entrance was also relocated to 47th Street, where the facade was raised and a marquee sign was installed. Escalators along 47th Street connect the new entrance to a new orchestra-level lobby next to the raised auditorium. In total, the theater was expanded from 40,000 to 80,000 square feet (3,700 to 7,400 m^{2}).

== Auditorium ==
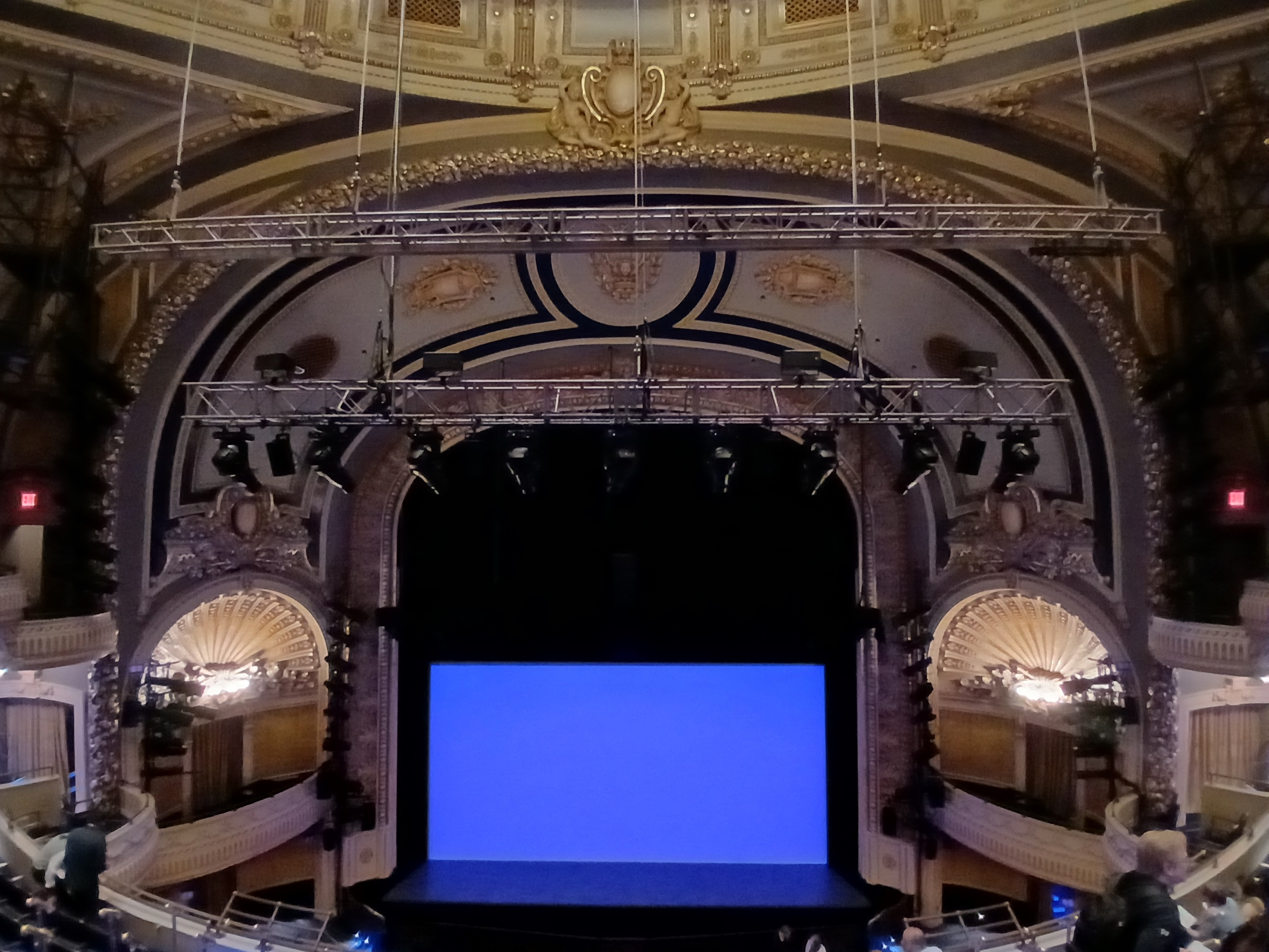
Auditorium, facing the proscenium

The auditorium, which the New York City Landmarks Preservation Commission (LPC) has protected as a city landmark, is the only portion of the original theater that survives. It is placed in a rigid enclosure that is structurally separate from the buildings within which it has been housed. The auditorium has boxes, two balconies above an orchestra level, and a large stage behind an oversized proscenium arch. The auditorium's width is slightly greater than its depth. The foyer and lobby were designed with plaster decorations in high relief, which alluded to the vaudeville presented at the Palace, while the stage itself was originally sloped. Though the auditorium's orchestra level was originally at the ground story, it was raised to the third story when TSX Broadway was built.

The New York Times described the auditorium as "Baroque with Beaux-Arts influences". Many of the original design features were removed over the years and were restored in the 2020s using plaster molds and historical photographs.

=== Seating areas ===
As of 2024, the theater has 1,648 seats; prior to its closure in 2018, the auditorium had 1,743 seats. The orchestra level has a raked floor that slopes downward toward the stage. Both balcony levels have curved fronts and cantilever above the orchestra, sloping downward toward the stage. All three levels contain promenades, which have cornices on their ceilings. Staircases behind each promenade connect the three levels of seating. One of the staircases was nicknamed the "Judy Garland staircase" because the actress Judy Garland would use it for surprise entrances. In addition, an elevator connects all three seating levels.

The first balcony level extends half the depth of the orchestra and contains two staircases about halfway through. The front of the balcony has decorative moldings with classical masks, while its underside contains plaster moldings of ropes. The second balcony contains rope moldings on its underside, which form a rectangular pattern. The front edge of the second balcony's underside contains guilloche moldings interspersed with oak branches, above which are decorative moldings with masks. The second balcony's side walls have decorative pilasters that support a frieze, as well as exit doors with curved pediments. The ceiling of the second balcony has ventilation grates, which are not part of the original design.

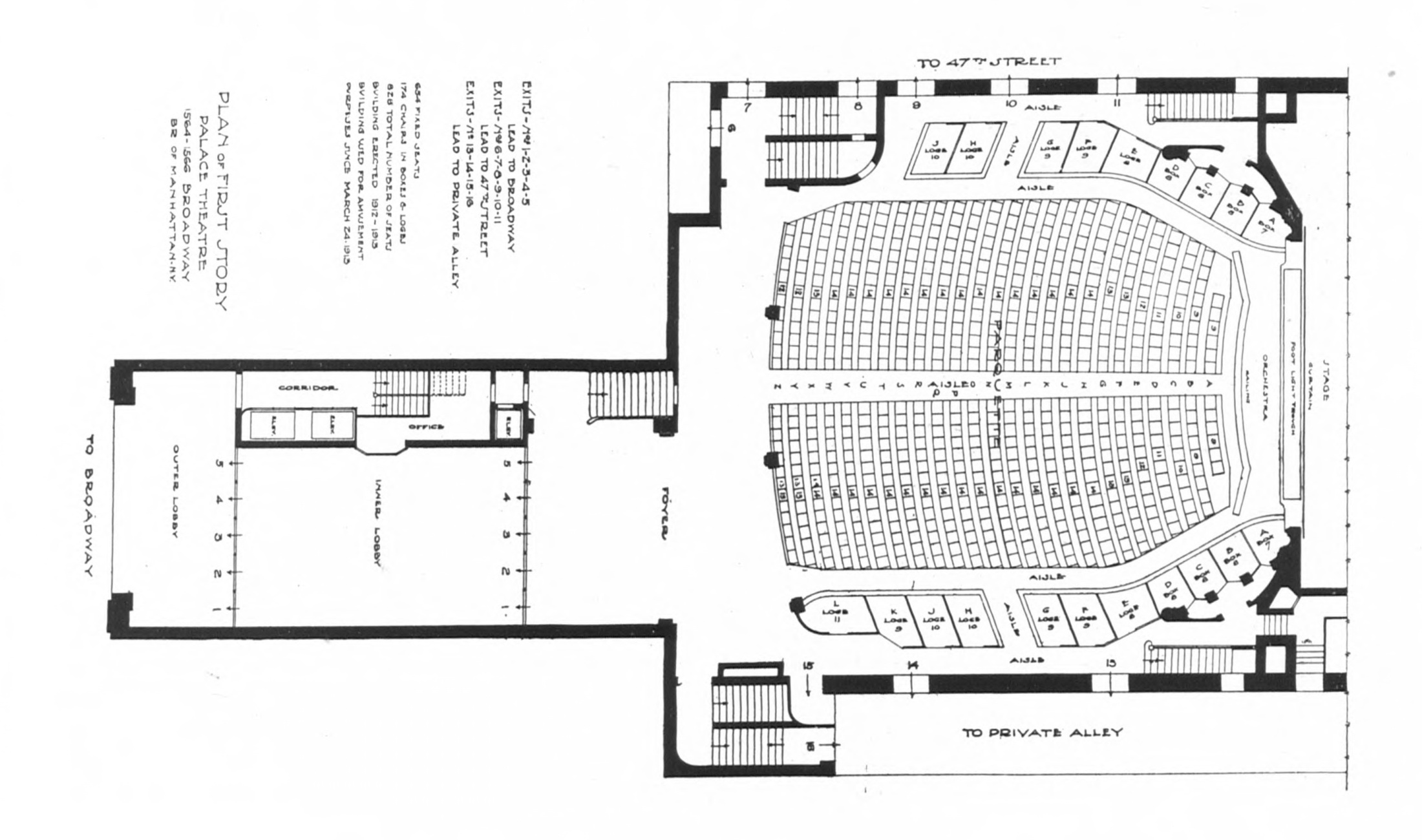
Original floor plan from 1913

The orchestra level has boxes on either side, divided by white-marble barriers with black-marble baseboards. On either side of the proscenium are arched niches with a doorway at orchestra level and a box at the first balcony level. Each niche's box contains a doorway with pilasters on either side, which are topped by console brackets that support a curved pediment with a tympanum. The niches are topped by a recessed lunette that resembles a shell or sunburst. The niches originally contained three boxes each, but these were extensively altered in a 1965 renovation. Additional boxes exist on both sides of both balcony levels. The first balcony level has one additional box behind each niche. The second balcony level has five curved boxes on each side in a terraced arrangement, with higher boxes being further from the stage. The fronts of the balcony-level boxes have decorative moldings, while the undersides of these boxes contain foliate ornamentation. Originally there were 20 boxes at orchestra level, 23 at the first balcony, and 12 at the second balcony. There was also a projection booth behind the balcony for film screenings, which was built in the 1930s and removed in the 2020s.

=== Other design features ===
Pendentives at each corner of the auditorium support a wide coved ceiling. The cove is divided into a set of panels with different types of scrolls and floral moldings. The front of the cove, near the sounding board, has a cartouche with putti. There is a flat ceiling surface with a pair of curved triangular panels, as well as a dome with modillions, rosettes, and fruit-and-flower moldings. There is an old-ivory bronze chandelier measuring 14 feet (4.3 m) across, which hangs from a pendant on the ceiling.

The proscenium arch measures 44 feet (13 m) across. It contains pellet, egg-and-dart, and acanthus-leaf moldings surrounding a band of acanthus leaves. The top of the arch consists of a keystone with a molding of a child's head. A sounding board rises above the proscenium arch, with foliate bands at the perimeter. At the center of the sounding board, above the stage, is a circular panel depicting a lyre. The orchestra pit is at the front of the orchestra seating level, in front of the proscenium. It dates from a 1965 renovation and contains high walls. The stage is behind the proscenium arch and orchestra pit. The stage historically had a Wurlitzer Opus 303 organ. The orchestra and stage both have stage lifts.

== History ==
The vaudevillian Martin Beck was the operator of the Orpheum Circuit, which in the early 20th century was the dominant vaudeville circuit on the West Coast of the United States. Its East Coast complement was the Keith–Albee circuit, composed of Benjamin Franklin Keith and Edward Albee, who operated venues both by themselves and through their United Booking Office. The Orpheum and Keith–Albee circuits had proposed a truce in 1906, wherein Orpheum would control vaudeville west of Chicago and Keith–Albee would control vaudeville east of Chicago, including New York City. This truce was implemented in 1907.

=== Development ===
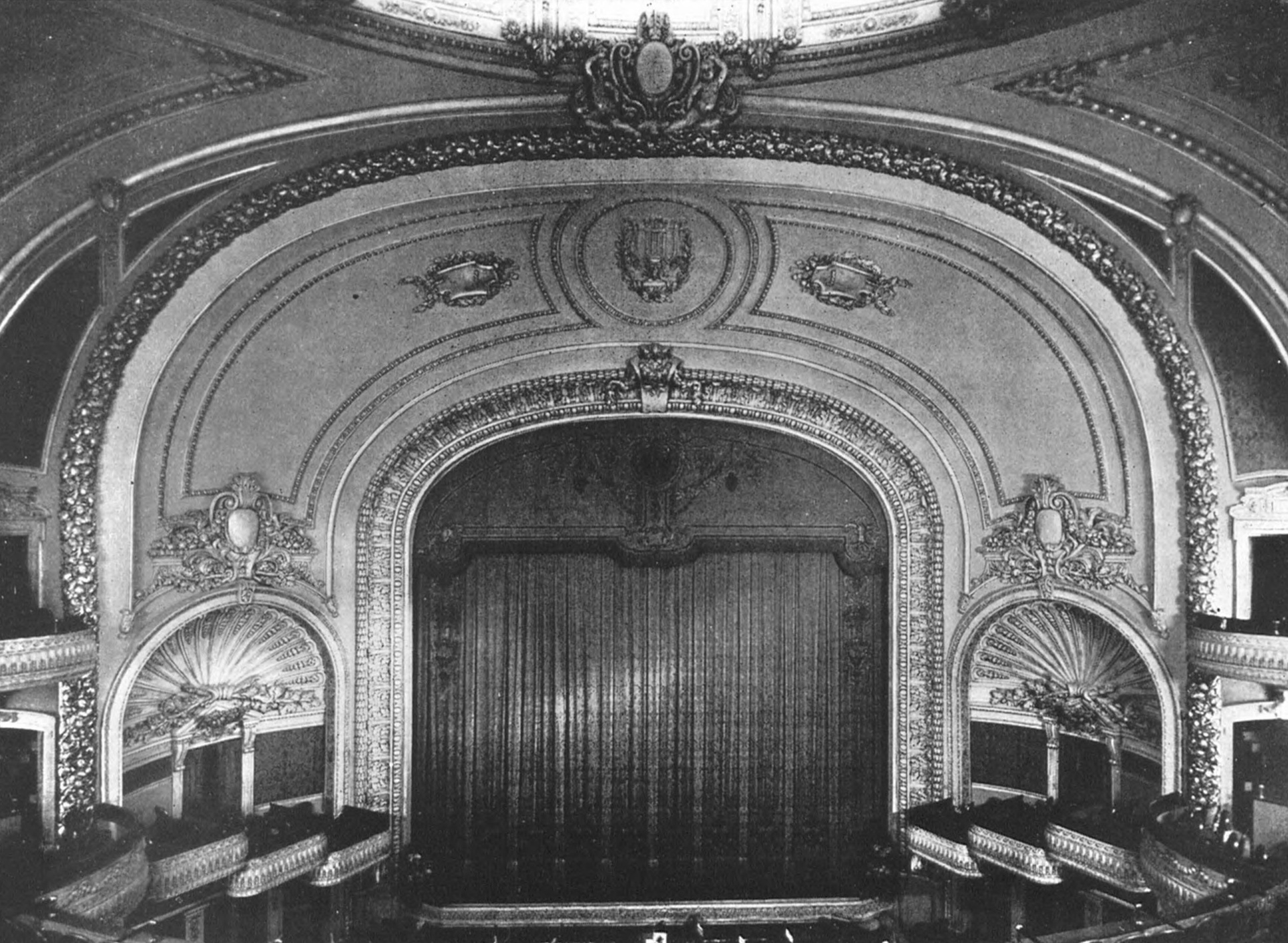
1913 view of the auditorium, facing the proscenium

Beck and Herman Fehr announced in December 1911 that they had leased the site with plans to construct a venue, the Palace Theatre. Beck's representatives initially said the Palace would not be part of the Orpheum interests and, therefore, would not be used to show vaudeville. Beck subsequently recanted, saying he would use the Palace for vaudeville. In February 1912, Kirchhoff & Rose and Gavigan filed plans with the New York City Department of Buildings for a theater building at Broadway and 47th Street.

Due to the truce between Orpheum and Keith–Albee, Edward Albee initially said any vaudeville act that played the Palace would not be allowed on the Keith–Albee circuit. Albee demanded that Beck turn over three-quarters ownership to use acts from the Keith–Albee circuit, to which Beck acquiesced. (Note: According to Slide 2012, p. 385, Keith and Albee only had 51 percent ownership.) Albee moved the B. F. Keith office to the fifth floor, and the UBO office moved to the office wing as well. Furthermore, Willie Hammerstein held the exclusive franchise to vaudeville performances around Times Square. Because of the vaudeville restriction, Werba & Luescher obtained an option on the new theater in mid-1912. Hammerstein initially refused to sell his exclusive vaudeville franchise to Albee, but Hammerstein agreed to a $200,000 settlement in May 1913, after the theater had opened. The Palace's programming was still unknown to the public until February 1913, when The New York Times announced the theater would be "something along the lines of English music halls", with events such as ballets, rather than "strict vaudeville".

=== Vaudeville ===
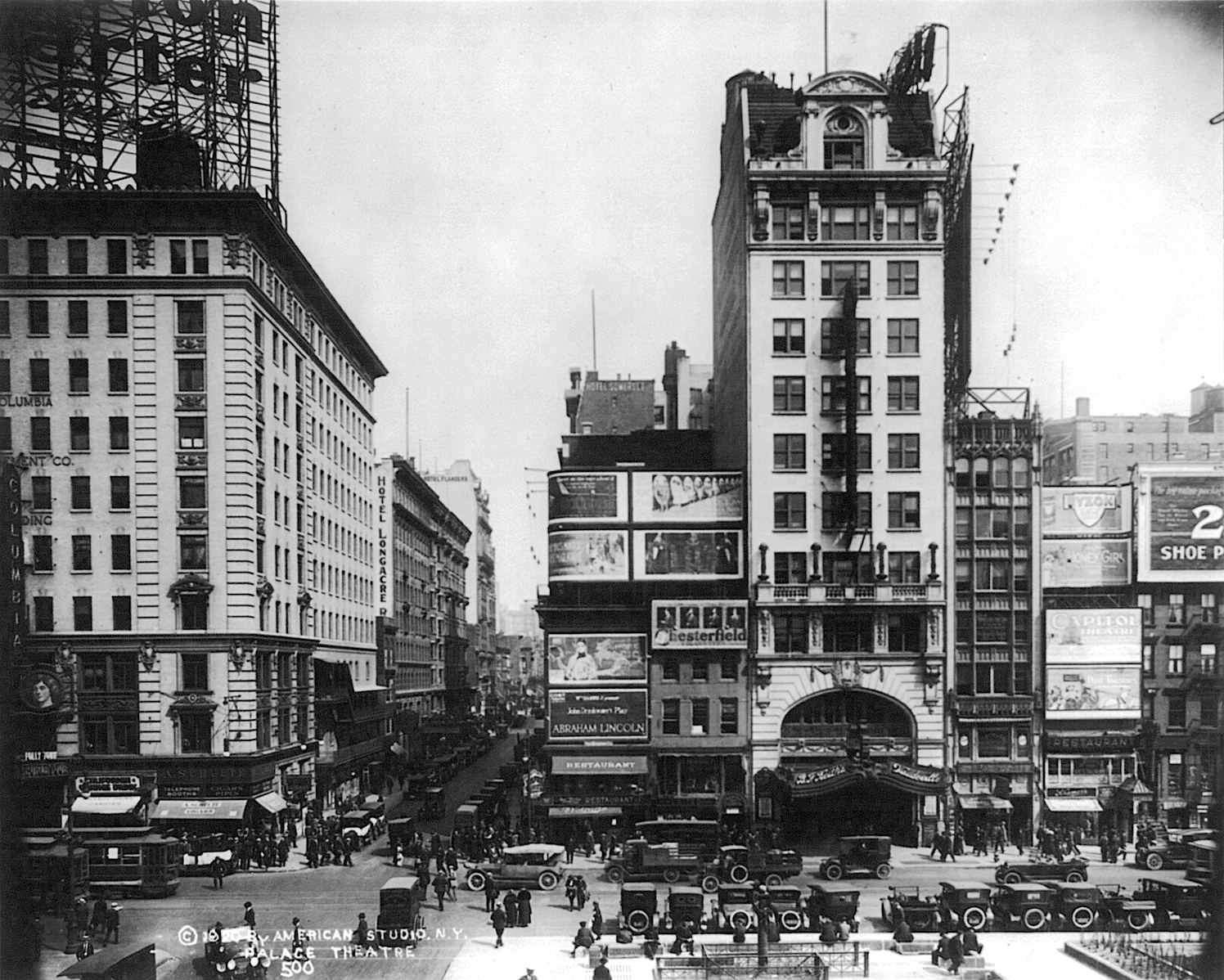
The Palace Theatre, c. 1920

The theater finally opened on March 24, 1913, with headliner Ed Wynn. Tickets cost $1.50 for matinees and $2.00 for nighttime performances. The screenwriter Marian Spitzer wrote of opening day: "The theatre itself, living up to advance publicity, was spacious, handsome and lavishly decorated in crimson and gold. But nothing happened that afternoon to suggest the birth of a great theatrical tradition." Rather, the public mostly considered its $2 admission fees to be expensive. The media widely mocked the opening bill; four days after the Palace opened, Variety magazine printed an article entitled "Palace $2 Vaudeville a Joke: Double-Crossing Boomerang". Also problematic was the presence of Hammerstein's Victoria Theatre, a much more successful and established vaudeville venue. The Variety article noted that, while the Victoria had played to capacity two days in a row, the Palace had to give out free coupons to half the guests and still struggled to fill the balcony seats.

The Palace's first success was the one-act play Miss Civilization, featuring Ethel Barrymore, six weeks after the theater opened. It was only after an appearance by French actress Sarah Bernhardt on May 5, 1913, that the Palace became popular. Except for a period from May to December 1913, the Palace had performances every day for the next two decades. By December 1914, Variety was characterizing the Palace as "the greatest vaudeville theater in America, if not the world". The death of Willie Hammerstein the same year, and the subsequent closure of the Victoria, contributed to the Palace's popularity. Keith also died in 1914, giving Albee even more control of the Palace. Albee sometimes traded on the performers' desire for this goal by forcing acts to accept smaller profits. To "play the Palace" meant that entertainers had reached the pinnacles of their vaudeville careers. The theater itself was nicknamed the "Valhalla of Vaudeville". Performer Jack Haley wrote:

Only a vaudevillian who has trod its stage can really tell you about it ... only a performer can describe the anxieties, the joys, the anticipation, and the exultation of a week's engagement at the Palace. The walk through the iron gate on 47th Street through the courtyard to the stage door, was the cum laude walk to a show business diploma. A feeling of ecstasy came with the knowledge that this was the Palace, the epitome of the more than 15,000 vaudeville theaters in America, and the realization that you have been selected to play it. Of all the thousands upon thousands of vaudeville performers in the business, you are there. This was a dream fulfilled; this was the pinnacle of Variety success.

A typical bill would have nine acts, who would perform twice a day. The bills were rotated every Monday. Consequently, the Monday matinee was generally considered among vaudevillians to be the most important of any given week, with the harshest audience. A failed act would generally be eliminated from the evening shows. Because of the constant rotations of acts, Variety observed in 1914 that the theater was "using up headliners at an alarming rate". At its peak, the Palace's annual profit was $500,000, and the average bill was paid $12,000. About three-quarters of revenue was from subscriptions, and many patrons who regularly visited the Monday afternoon shows were subscription holders. Performing comedians would select "stooges" from the Palace's box seats. The audience members in the right-side first-balcony boxes would generally assist the performers.

==== Vaudeville headliners ====
Throughout vaudeville's heyday, the headliners (usually billed next to the closing act) included:

Notable vaudeville headliners at the theater
Performer	Year of appearance	Refs.
Ed Wynn	1913	
Ethel Barrymore	1913	
Nora Bayes	1914	
Fritzi Scheff	1914	
Nan Halperin	1915	
Will Rogers	1916	
Blossom Seeley	1917	
Lillian Russell	1918	
Leon Errol	1919	
Marie Cahill	1919	
Olga Petrova	1919	
"Dixie Duo" (Noble Sissle and Eubie Blake)	1919	
Bert Williams	1919	
Marie Dressler	1919	
Aileen Stanley	1920, 1926, 1930, 1931	
The Marx Brothers	1920	
Lou Clayton and Cliff Edwards	1921	
Bessie Clayton	1921	
Fanny Brice	1923	
Isabella Patricola ("Miss Patricola")	1923, 1926, 1927, 1938	
Cecilia Loftus	1923	
Trixie Friganza	1924	
Florence Mills	1924	
Cliff Edwards	1924	
Doc Rockwell	1925	
Weber and Fields	1925	
Hamilton Sisters and Fordyce (the Three X Sisters) and Jerry and Her Baby Grands	1925 or 1926	
Eva Tanguay	1926	
Barto and Mann	1927, 1929	
Ethel Waters	1927	
Julian Eltinge	1927	
Duncan Sisters	1927	
Clark and McCullough	1928	
Clayton, Jackson & Durante	1928	
Buck and Bubbles	1928, 1929	
Harry Langdon	1929	
Mary Hay and Clifton Webb	1929	
Phil Baker	1930, 1931, 1932	
George Jessel	1930	
Adelaide Hall	1930, 1931, 1933	

==== Other performers ====
Other vaudeville performers appearing at the Palace included:

- Burns and Allen
- Jack Benny
- Sarah Bernhardt
- Eddie Cantor
- Vernon and Irene Castle
- Gus Edwards
- Frank Fay
- Benny Fields
- Bob Hope
- Eddie Leonard
- George Jessel
- Helen Kane
- Bert Lahr
- Ethel Merman
- Bill Robinson
- Blossom Seeley
- Kate Smith
- Sophie Tucker

==== Decline ====
The circuit became Keith–Albee–Orpheum in 1925 and it acquired film companies the following year. With the Great Depression came a rise in the popularity of film and radio, and vaudeville saw a steep decline. The Paramount Theatre of 1926 and Roxy Theatre of 1927, in particular, were major competitors to the Palace. Many bills were held at the Palace for several consecutive weeks due to their popularity, which turned away subscription holders who wished for more variety; furthermore, many acts demanded increased salaries. After Keith–Albee–Orpheum merged with RCA and the Film Booking Office to form RKO Pictures in 1928, the circuit's vaudeville houses became movie houses. In 1929, the Keith's booking office relocated from the fifth floor of the office wing to the sixth.

To attract vaudeville-goers, the Palace added an electric piano in the lobby and colored lights in the auditorium during the late 1920s. Vaudeville was still popular as late as 1931, when Kate Smith had a ten-week-long run. After considering a three-a-day production, (Note: Bloom 2007, pp. 203–204, says the Palace was three-a-day by 1929, but a 1932 New York Daily News article cites the Palace as the "only all-vaudeville two-a-day theatre in the country".) the Palace moved to four shows a day in May 1932 and lowered its admission prices. A fifth show was subsequently added, but this failed to increase the number of attendees.

=== Post-vaudeville ===
==== Movie palace use ====
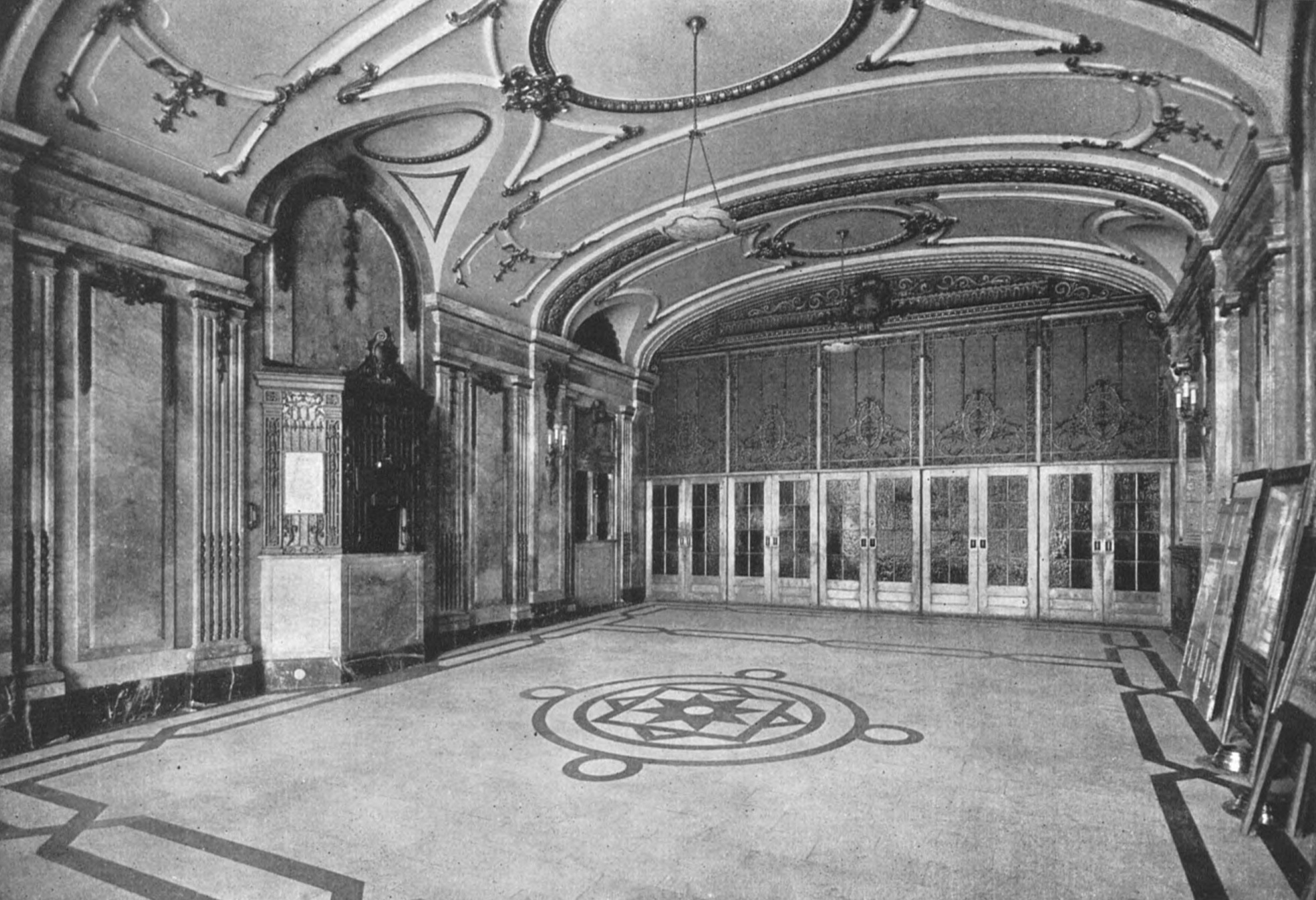
The original lobby prior to its renovation in 1939

The last week of straight vaudeville at the Palace premiered July 9, 1932, featuring Louis Sobol. Afterward, the Palace instituted a mixed policy of vaudeville before a feature film, which continued for several months. The last vaudeville accompaniment took place on November 12, 1932, with Nick Lucas and Hal Le Roy appearing on the closing bill. Thereafter, the Palace was converted to a movie palace, showing films exclusively under RKO Pictures. The film-only policy was not initially successful because many major studios already operated their own theaters in Times Square. Theatrical historian Louis Botto said that "from the 1930s on, it was a constant struggle for survival" for the Palace, which frequently flipped between film-only, vaudeville/film, and live performance formats.

The Palace reverted to a vaudeville-before-film policy on January 7, 1933, two months after it started showing films exclusively. The venue spent the next two years alternating between film-only and vaudeville-before-film formats. For fourteen years beginning in 1935, the Palace showed movies almost exclusively. The booking office in the Palace Theatre's office wing moved several blocks away to Radio City Music Hall. There was a brief return to a live revue format in 1936, when Broadway producer Nils Granlund staged a series of variety shows, beginning with "Broadway Heat Wave" featuring female orchestra leader Rita Rio. Among the films shown at the RKO Palace was the RKO picture Citizen Kane, which had its world premiere at the theater in 1941.

In preparation for the 1939 New York World's Fair, RKO began to erect a 40-by-25-foot (12.2 by 7.6 m) marquee in front of the office wing in April 1939. The next month, RKO announced the Palace would be renovated. The alterations included renovating the outer lobby with black-and-white granite walls and the inner lobby with zebra wood and black marble walls. Additionally, aluminum and bronze frames were installed in the outer lobby. The work also included installing doors between the inner and outer lobbies. The renovations were finished in August 1939. Further renovations followed in the early 1940s, when some of the boxes were removed since they did not have a good view of the cinema screen.

==== Attempted revival of vaudeville ====
The RKO Palace was closed for a $60,000 renovation in early 1949. It received new seats and carpets; upgraded acoustic features and stage; and a new ticket booth in the lobby. Beginning in May 1949, under RKO vice president Sol Schwartz, the RKO Palace tried to revive vaudeville with a slate of eight acts before a feature film. Within two months of vaudeville being reintroduced, Schwartz said patronage was "very encouraging". The Palace was closed for a two-week renovation in October 1951. After the Palace reopened, Judy Garland staged a 19-week comeback at the venue, supported by acts such as Max Bygraves. This was the first occurrence of two-a-day vaudeville at the Palace in nearly 18 years. The Palace also attracted acts including Lauritz Melchior, José Greco, Betty Hutton, Danny Kaye, Dick Shawn, and Phil Spitalny. Garland returned for a successful run in 1956, this time with Alan King.

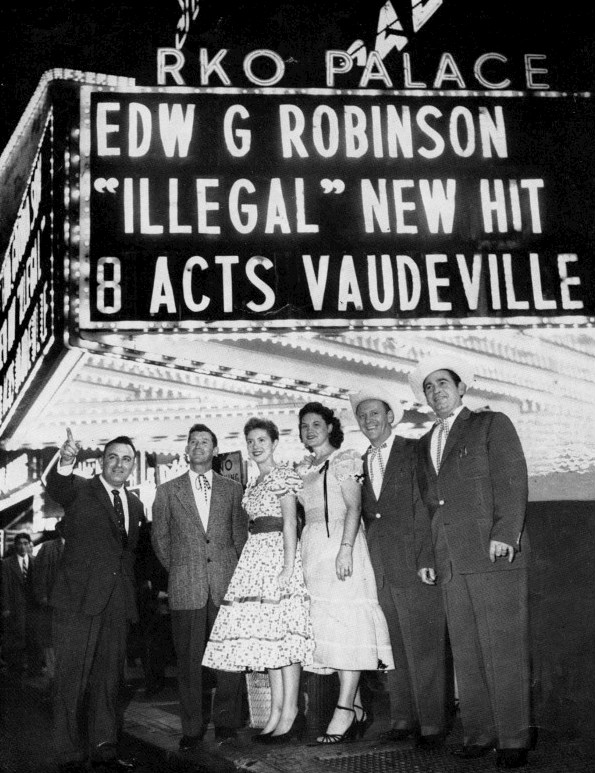
Publicity shot of RKO Palace marquee, still advertising "vaudeville", c. 1955

While the shows were successful, they did not lead to a revival of the vaudeville format. According to theatrical historian Ken Bloom, the Palace "limped along into the fifties with an occasional good week", but the popularity of television had restricted the profitability of the Palace's vaudeville. Performances by Jerry Lewis and Liberace, in 1957, failed to attract enough audience members. As a result, the Palace dropped its vaudeville policy in July 1957. Its film screenings began with James Cagney's Man of a Thousand Faces on August 13, 1957. The films included The Diary of Anne Frank, which premiered in 1959. The Palace hosted one more vaudeville performance by Harry Belafonte in December 1959.

=== Broadway theater ===
==== Nederlander conversion ====
The RKO Palace was no longer profitable as a cinema by March 1965, and RKO considered selling it to Sherman S. Krellberg for conversion into a Broadway theater. That July, the Nederlander Organization agreed to purchase the Palace from RKO for about $1.4 million or $1.6 million. The Nederlanders also acquired the ground lease, which had 52 years remaining in its term. The last film to play the RKO Palace was Harlow in August 1965, and the Nederlanders formally acquired the theater the same month. The Nederlanders incorporated the All State Amusement Corporation to operate the theater. For the Palace to break even, each production would have to gross $65,000 a week.

The Nederlanders spent $500,000 to renovate the venue into a legitimate theater. Many of the decorations that were added after the theater's opening were removed, revealing the original design. Among the decorations uncovered were ironwork, marble balustrades, and the molded ceiling of the lobby. In the basement, workers found a gold vault that was filled with paint cans, as well as crystal chandeliers. The auditorium was outfitted with red decorations and gold-and-cream walls, while the basement was renovated to include a dressing room for the primary performer. Two bars were installed: one in the lobby and one in the basement. The renovations made the Palace the only Broadway theater that was actually on Broadway, and, with 1,732 seats, the largest Broadway house. Ralph Alswang oversaw the restoration of the Palace. The Stage magazine printed the Palace Theatre's programs, competing with Playbill magazine, the traditional publisher of stage programs.

On January 29, 1966, the Palace opened as a Broadway venue with the original production of the musical Sweet Charity. The production ran at the Palace for 608 performances. The Nederlanders wished to keep the Palace Theatre open even when there was no theatrical engagement. For some time, the Palace showed films and presented concert performances between engagements. Judy Garland's performance in July 1967 was recorded for a live album, Judy Garland at Home at the Palace: Opening Night; it was followed the same year by a double bill with Eddie Fisher and Buddy Hackett. Later in 1967, the musical Henry, Sweet Henry had a relatively short run of 80 performances. More successful was George M!, which opened in 1968 and ran over 400 performances.

During the 1970s, the Palace hosted live performances from Josephine Baker, Bette Midler, Vikki Carr, Shirley MacLaine, and Diana Ross. The Palace additionally hosted the 25th Tony Awards in 1971. During this time, the theater hosted the musical Applause, which had opened in 1970 and ran for 896 performances over two years. The next hit was the musical Lorelei, which opened in 1974 and lasted ten months. The musical Man of La Mancha ran at the Palace for three months in 1977; it was followed in 1979 by the musical Oklahoma!, which had 301 performances. Yet another musical, Woman of the Year, opened in 1981 and stayed for two years. The Palace's most successful production in its first two decades as a Broadway venue was La Cage aux Folles, which opened in 1983 and ran for more than four years.

==== 1980s renovation to mid-2010s ====
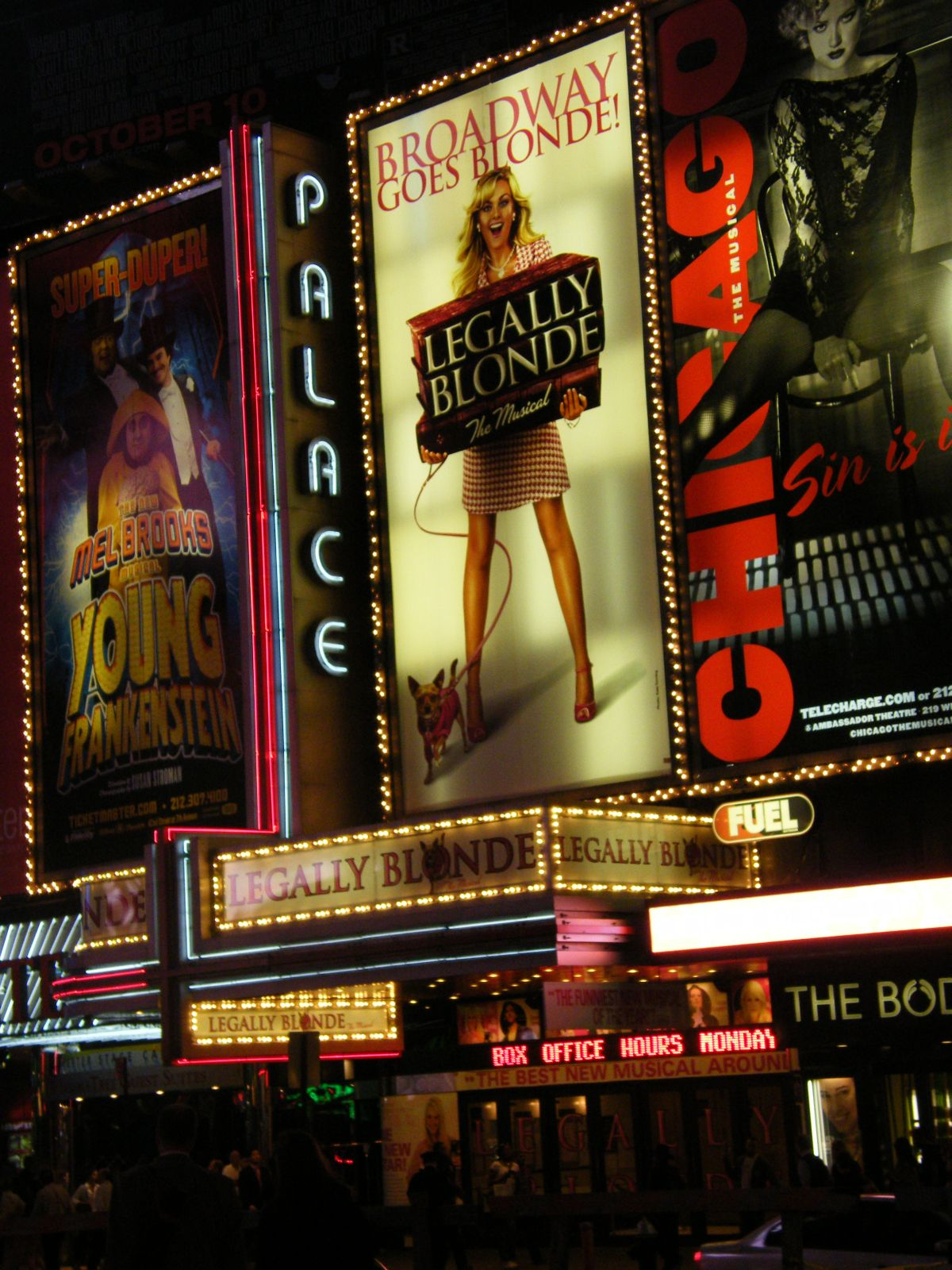
Legally Blonde at the Palace Theatre

Developer Larry Silverstein had planned to build a skyscraper on the Palace Theater's site since the mid-1980s. Such a development was contingent on his ability to acquire a Bowery Savings Bank branch at the corner of 47th Street and Seventh Avenue, surrounded by the original Palace Theatre building. Even after acquiring that site, he had to wait until after the New York City Landmarks Preservation Commission (LPC) reviewed the theater for city-landmark status in 1987. If the landmark status was approved, Silverstein would have to build around the theater. This was part of the LPC's wide-ranging effort in 1987 to grant landmark status to Broadway theaters. Ultimately, only the interior was designated as a landmark; a similar status for the exterior was denied. The LPC wrote that the Palace Theatre would be "virtually uncontested" as the most famous Broadway theaters. In late 1987, the theater closed after the last performance of La Cage aux Folles.

The New York City Board of Estimate ratified the landmark designation in March 1988. The Nederlanders, the Shuberts, and Jujamcyn collectively sued the LPC in June 1988 to overturn the landmark designations of 22 theaters, including the Palace, on the merit that the designations severely limited the extent to which the theaters could be modified. The lawsuit was escalated to the New York Supreme Court and the Supreme Court of the United States, but these designations were ultimately upheld in 1992. Meanwhile, the office wing was demolished (except for the lobby), as were two stories above the auditorium and two ancillary structures. Silverstein developed a 43-story Embassy Suites hotel on the site. The theater received a $1.5 million renovation as part of the $150 million hotel project. The hotel was completed in September 1990.

The Will Rogers Follies opened in the renovated theater on May 1, 1991, running until 1993. The Palace then presented Beauty and the Beast from 1994 to 1999, before it transferred to the Lunt-Fontanne. Aida, which ran from 2000 through 2004, had 1,852 performances. The theater also staged Legally Blonde: The Musical from 2007 to 2008; West Side Story from 2009 to 2011; Priscilla, Queen of the Desert from 2011 to 2012; and Annie from 2012 to 2014. As part of a settlement with the United States Department of Justice in 2014, the Nederlanders agreed to improve disabled access at their nine Broadway theaters, including the Palace. Also in early 2014, the orchestra seating was rearranged as part of a $200,000 renovation prior to the opening of Holler If Ya Hear Me; that musical opened in June 2014 and ran for six weeks. An American in Paris, a stage adaptation of the 1951 MGM film, opened in April 2015 for an 18-month run. The Illusionists: Turn of the Century ran a limited engagement from November 2016 to January 2017, and Sunset Boulevard also had a limited engagement from February to June 2017.

==== 2010s and 2020s renovation ====
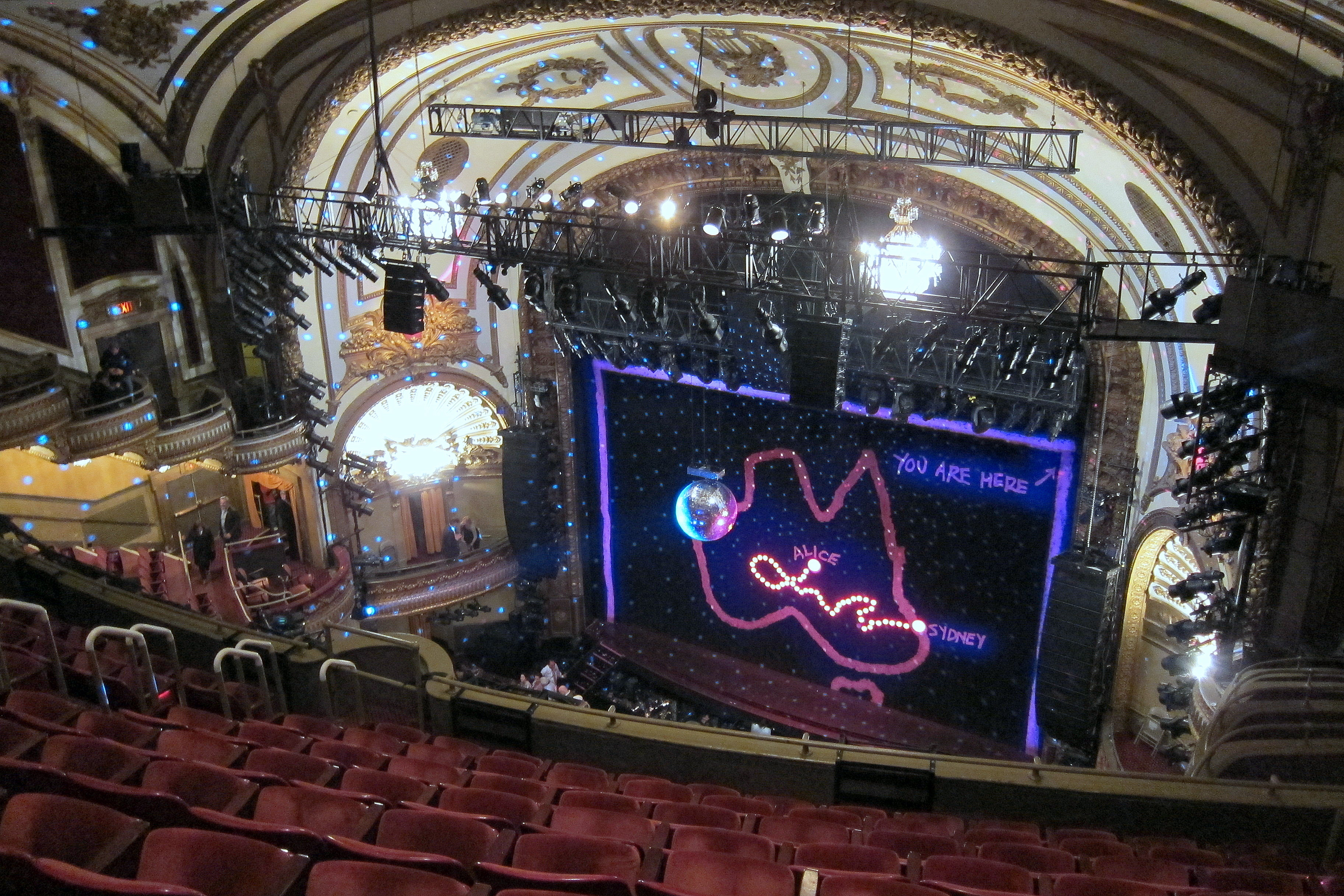
Auditorium interior as seen in 2011

In 2015, the Nederlander Organization and Maefield Development announced another renovation in conjunction with the TSX Broadway development. The project would include a new lobby and entrance on 47th Street as well as dressing rooms and other patron amenities. The landmark interior would be raised 30 feet (9.1 m) to accommodate ground-floor retail spaces. The LPC approved the plan in November 2015, even as many preservationists expressed concern over the idea. The New York City Council approved the plan in June 2018, allowing the redevelopment to progress. The musical SpongeBob SquarePants was the last show to play at the theater prior to the renovation, running from December 2017 to September 2018. Demolition of the existing structure began in late 2019. Platt Byard Dovell White was hired to redesign the Palace Theatre's interior.

The reconstruction was originally estimated to keep the Palace closed until 2021. The renovation was delayed during 2019 because the contractors needed to inspect an adjacent building, but the property's owners did not grant permission for the inspection for over a year. The old 1568 Broadway building was being demolished by early 2020. Work was only interrupted for three weeks during the COVID-19 pandemic in New York City, as the TSX Broadway project had hotel rooms and was thus classified as an "essential jobsite". Construction of TSX Broadway's superstructure began the next year. The theater also underwent a renovation, which involved restoring the plasterwork and original chandelier, adding sound insulation, and erecting a new box office and new restrooms.

The auditorium was raised starting in January 2022. During the lift, the bottom of the auditorium was cushioned by a 5-foot-thick (1.5 m) layer of concrete, installed by foundation engineer Urban Foundation Engineering. The lift was conducted using 34 hydraulic posts, which were sunk 30 feet (9.1 m) into the ground. The posts consisted of telescoping beams, which moved the auditorium by 0.25 inches (6.4 mm) an hour. After the theater had been raised 16 or 17 feet (4.9 or 5.2 m), in March 2022, the lifting process was temporarily paused while the new structural frame was installed. The lifting process was completed on April 5, 2022, though the formal celebration was held the next month. Afterward, the permanent supports under the auditorium were installed. At the time, TSX Broadway was planned to be completed in 2023, though this was then delayed to the first quarter of 2024. Although the cost of the renovation was estimated in 2022 at $50 million, the project ultimately cost $80 million.

==== Mid-2020s to present ====
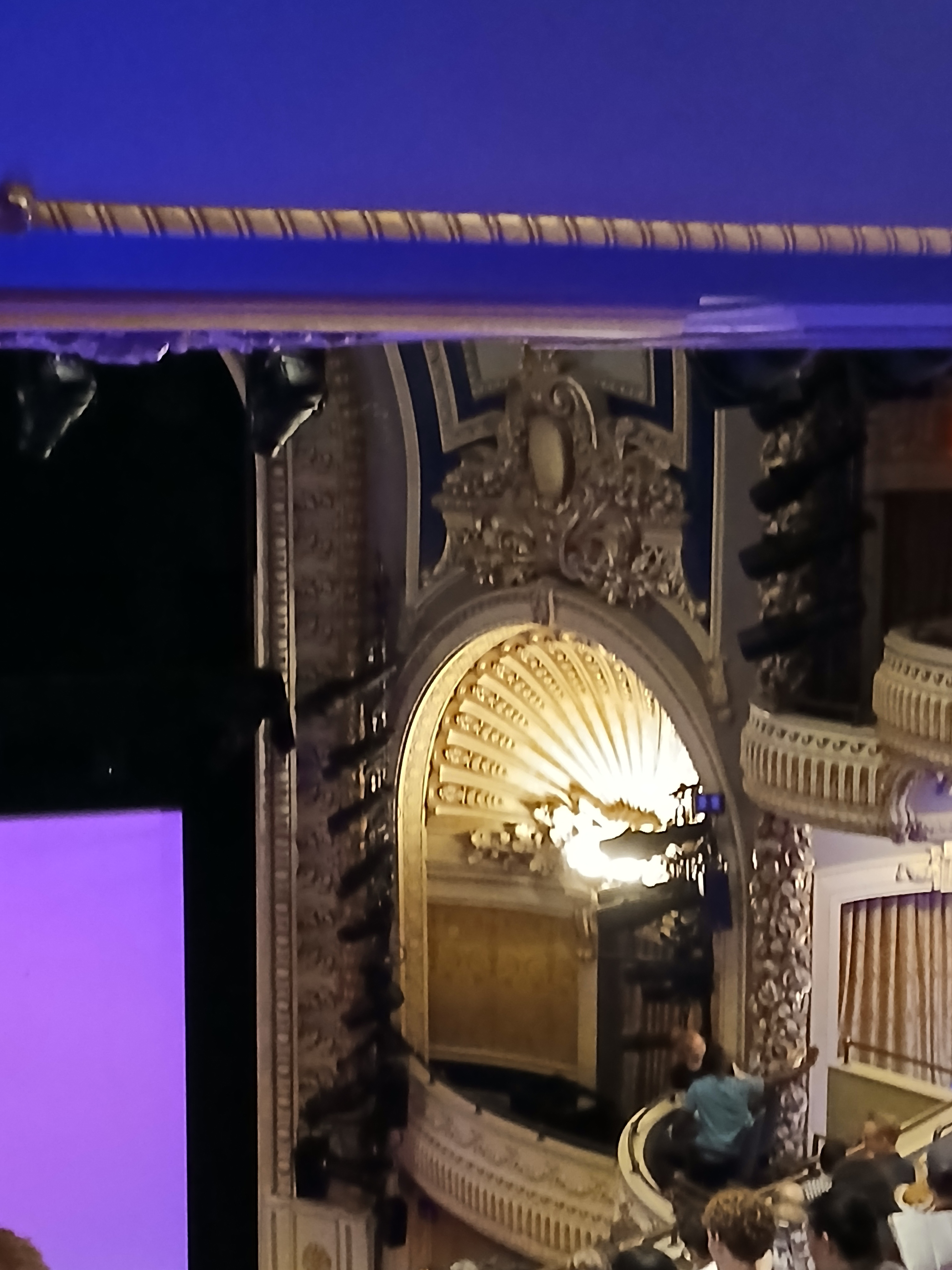
The right-hand box, seen from the mezzanine in 2025

In March 2024, the Nederlander Organization announced that the theater would reopen on May 28, 2024, with a concert residency by Ben Platt. The residency lasted for 18 performances. This was followed by the musical Tammy Faye, which opened in November 2024 and closed on December 8 after 24 previews and 29 regular performances. A revival of Glengarry Glen Ross opened at the theater in March 2025 for a three-month limited engagement, which was followed by a revival of Beetlejuice in October 2025 for a 13-week limited engagement. The musical adaptation of The Lost Boys opened at the Palace in April 2026.

== Alleged haunting ==
The ghost of acrobat Louis Bossalina allegedly haunts the theater. Observers have said that the ghost is a white-clothed figure swinging in the air before emitting a "blood-curdling scream" and falling. Bossalina, who was a member of the acrobatic act the Four Casting Pearls, was injured when he fell 18 feet (5.5 m) during a performance on August 28, 1935, before 800 theatergoers. Bossalina's act was not a trapeze but rather fixed towers in which the acrobats were "cast from one to the other". Comedian Pat Henning started his act in front of a curtain that was pulled right after the accident. Bossalina died in 1963. According to television channel NY1, sightings of Bossalina only occurred through the 1980s, though another source cited a sighting in the 1990s during a showing of Beauty and the Beast.

== Notable productions ==
Productions are listed by the year of their first performance. This list only includes Broadway shows; it does not include vaudeville shows or films.

Notable productions at the theater
Opening year	Name	Refs.
1966	Sweet Charity	
1967	Henry, Sweet Henry	
1968	George M!	
1970	Applause	
1973	Cyrano	
1973	Bette Midler	
1974	Lorelei	
1975	Goodtime Charley	
1976	Home Sweet Homer	
1976	Shirley MacLaine Live at the Palace	
1976	An Evening with Diana Ross	
1977	Man of La Mancha	
1979	The Grand Tour	
1979	Beatlemania	
1979	Oklahoma!	
1981	Woman of the Year	
1983	La Cage aux Folles	
1991	The Will Rogers Follies	
1994	Beauty and the Beast	
1999	Minnelli on Minnelli: Live at the Palace	
2000	Aida	
2005	All Shook Up	
2006	Lestat	
2007	Legally Blonde	
2008	Liza's at The Palace....	
2009	West Side Story	
2011	Priscilla Queen of the Desert	
2012	Annie	
2014	Holler If Ya Hear Me	
2014	The Temptations and the Four Tops on Broadway	
2015	An American in Paris	
2016	The Illusionists: Turn of the Century	
2017	Sunset Boulevard	
2017	SpongeBob SquarePants	
2024	Ben Platt: Live at the Palace	
2024	Tammy Faye	
2025	Glengarry Glen Ross	
2025	Beetlejuice	
2026	The Lost Boys	

== See also ==
- List of buildings and structures on Broadway in Manhattan
- List of Broadway theaters
- List of New York City Designated Landmarks in Manhattan from 14th to 59th Streets
