= Irving Fields =

American songwriter

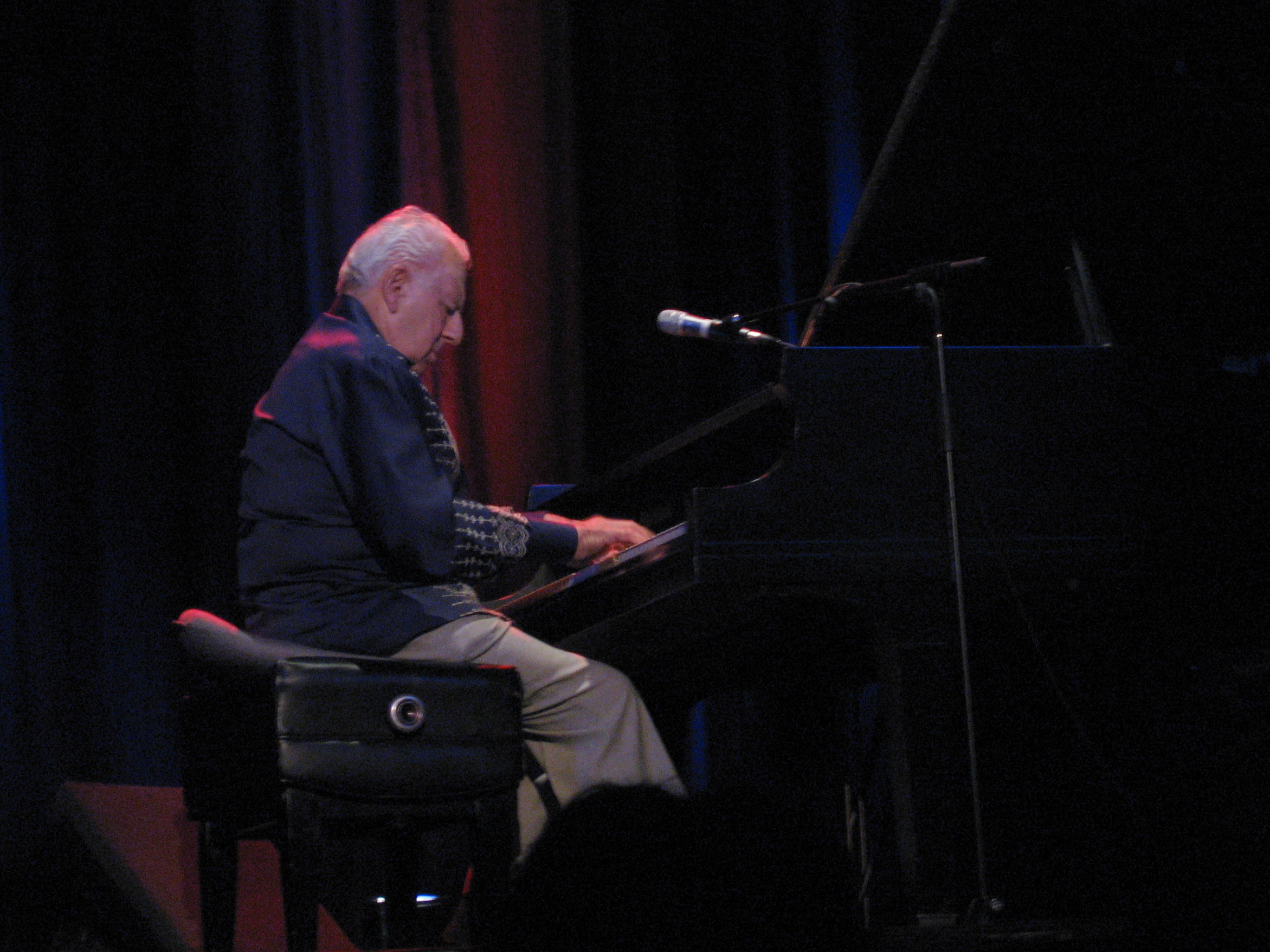
- Fields playing at a concert of Canadian musician Socalled in 2005

Background information
- Born: Yitzhak Schwartz; August 4, 1915; New York, New York, U.S.
- Died: August 20, 2016 (aged 101) Manhattan, New York, U.S.
- Genre: Lounge music
- Instrument: Piano

Irving Fields (born Yitzhak Schwartz; August 4, 1915 – August 20, 2016) was an American pianist and lounge music artist who was born in New York City. Some of his most noteworthy compositions include "Miami Beach Rhumba"; "Managua, Nicaragua"; and "Chantez, Chantez," covered by Dinah Shore in 1957. From November 1, 1954 to January 3, 1955, he and his orchestra appeared on the DuMont Television Network series The Ilona Massey Show, hosted by Ilona Massey.

== Career ==
Fields' most famous album is Bagels & Bongos (1959), recorded for Decca Records with his trio, which sold two million copies. The next year he released the sequel More Bagels & Bongos, which was reissued on CD in 2009 by Roman Midnight Music under the direct creative advisement of 94-year-old Fields, the only reissue commissioned directly by Irving. Fields claimed to have recorded nearly 100 albums featuring trios, quartets, orchestras and solo. His most known work is the 1960s output that directly followed Bagels & Bongos and fused international music with Latin, including: Bikinis and Bongos, featuring Hawaiian music, Pizza and Bongos featuring Italian music and Champagne and Bongos featuring French music. He also did an album of songs done in a Twist style called Twistin!. Fields' sister was Peppy Fields, often called the Sophie Tucker of Miami, who hosted celebrity radio and TV shows for 35 years.

Fields wrote, upon a fan's request, a YouTube theme song. The song, "YouTube Dot Com Theme Song", which he wrote within fifteen minutes, has subsequently received over 800,000 views and was released on iTunes. In July 2012 Roman Midnight Music, a Manhattan indie book publisher/music label owned by music critic and author Aaron Joy published The Pianos I Have Known: The Autobiography Of Irving Fields. The book was created via conversations between 94 year old Fields with Tony Sachs, who writes regularly for The Huffington Post. As of 2015, Fields played six nights a week at Nino's Tuscany, an Italian restaurant in New York City.

Fields turned 100 in August 2015. He was featured in the Carl Reiner documentary "If You're Not In the Obit, Eat Breakfast", released in 2017. He died on 20 August 2016 in Manhattan at the age of 101.

== Partial discography ==
=== Irving Fields Trio ===
- The Fabulous Fingers, Fiesta FLP-1228
- Plays Irving Berlin in Fabulous Hi-Fi, Tops L1562
- At the Latin Quarter, 20th Century Fox 1010
- Broadway Hits in Hi-Fi, ABC-Paramount ABC-154
- At the Saint Moritz, ABC-Paramount ABC-187
- More Bagels and Bongos, Decca DL-74114 (reissued on CD by Roman Midnight Music)
- Pizzas and Bongos, Decca DL-74175
- Champagne and Bongos, Decca DL-74238
- Bikinis and Bongos, Decca DL-74323
- Bagels and Bongos, Decca DL-78856 (reissued on CD by Reboot Stereophonic)
- Irving Fields and his Trio at the Emerald Room, Decca DL-78901
- Latin Dance Date, RCA Camden CAL-350
- Melody Cruise to Hollywood, Oceanic OCP 510
- Year Round Party Fun, Oceanic OCP 511
- Melody Cruise to Paris, Oceanic OCP 512
- Melody Cruise to Italy, Oceanic OCP 513
- Melody Cruise to Latin America, Oceanic OCP 514
- Melody Cruise to Vienna, Oceanic OCP 515
- Melody Cruise To Israel, Oceanic OCP 516
- Melody Cruise to Spain and Mexico, Oceanic OCP 517
- Melody Cruise To Havana, Oceanic OCP 518
- Cha-Cha-Cha to America's Favorite Melodies, Oceanic OCP 519

=== The Irving Fields Orchestra ===
- Twistin' (reissued 2010)

=== Solo releases ===
- 50 Songs You'll Always Love, SMI 6
- 38 Romantic Favorites
- The Irving Fields Novelty Songs EP, Roman Midnight Music
- At Carnegie Hall
- Round The World Cruise
- My Yiddishe Mama's Favourites, Tzadik TZ8117
- Nisht Far Di Kinder! (Not For The Children!) Jewish Comedy Songs! Live At The Fallsview, New York, Roman Midnight Music
- Merry Christmas from Irving Fields
- Irving Fields Live in New York City
- The Classics Go Latin
