= Peppy Fields =

Ukrainian-American radio show host (1906–1998)

- Born: Rosie Schwartz; Kiev, Russia
- Died: October 28, 1998 (aged 92); Miami Beach, Florida, US

Peppy Fields (born Rosie Schwartz) was an American singer, performer, radio host, actress, comedian, recording artist, and philanthropist.

== Early life ==
Fields was born Rosie Schwartz, on August 1, 1906. She was born Rosie but in high school she decided to change her name to Rosamund, based on a character in Shakespeare's As You Like It. She later changed her name to Rosalie, and then Rosalind.

== Career ==
Field's career in entertainment began when she was 15 years old and won the title as Miss Coney Island. As a result she won a contract to play on the Lowe's Vaudeville Circuit. After four years she stepped out of entertainment to raise a family. When Fields was 50 years old, her brother, pianist and composer Irving Fields, was performing at a night club in New York and invited her to sing on the stage. The president of Jubilee Records happened to be in the crowd and invited Fields to create an album under his label. In 1960, she recorded her debut album "Red Hot and Peppy Fields" and Billboard Music awarded the album 4 out of 4 stars.

In 1960 she was a hostess of "Doing the Town with Peppy Fields" in New York City where she interviewed celebrities in nightclubs and restaurants. Fields relocated to Florida in 1962 and she became the hostess of the House Party on Station WEDR in Miami Beach. She continued her show by broadcasting live until 1997. Fields also appeared in two movies: Hot Stuff and The Stoolie. Fields produced and starred in her show Peppy Fields Night of Stars, which was an annual occurrence at the Miami Beach Theater of Performing Arts. The event was created by Fields and her husband, Danny Flaxman, which partnered with several organizations that benefited various aid groups, including the United Cerebral Palsy association.

== Awards and honors ==
Fields has been honored multiple times, including being named Goodwill Ambassador of Miami Beach in 1968, in 1979 she was named Citizen of the Year by Miami Beach Citizen News, and in 1997 she received a Life Achievement Award

== Personal life ==
She was married to Daniel Flaxman. The pair ran a club at the Lucerne Hotel in Miami Beach from 1962 to 1972.
