= B. F. Keith Circuit =

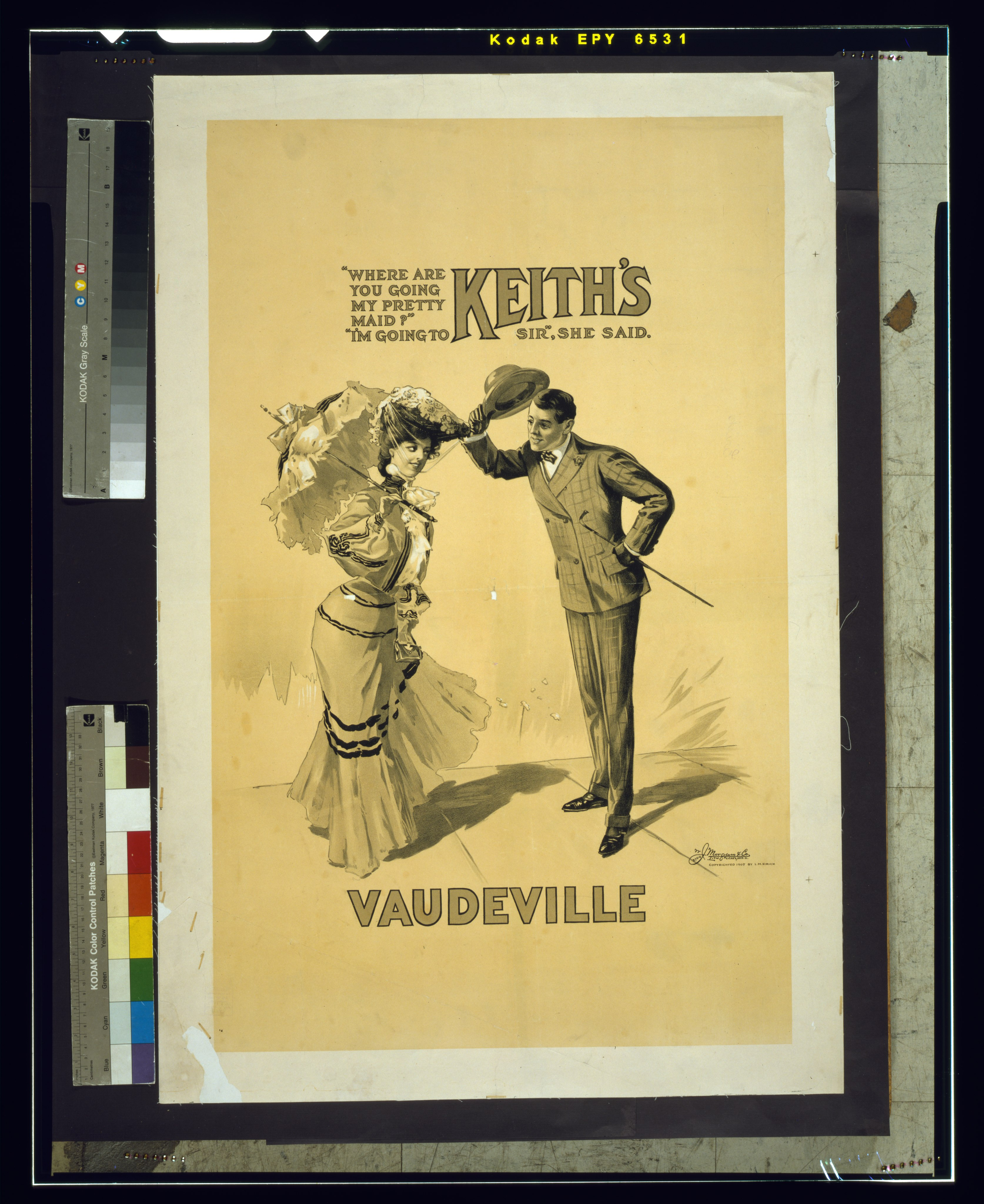
Poster for Keith's Vaudeville (1905)

The B. F. Keith Circuit was a chain of vaudeville theaters in the United States and Canada owned by Benjamin Franklin Keith for the acts that he booked. Known for a time as the United Booking Office, and under various other names, the circuit was managed by Edward Franklin Albee, who gained control of it in 1918, following the death of Keith's son A. Paul Keith.

== History ==
Keith entered the vaudeville business in 1883, when he began booking acts at the theater in his curiosity museum. Vaudeville eventually outdrew the museum and became Keith's primary business. In 1886, he obtained a lease on the Bijou Theatre in Boston. He quickly expanded his theater business, acquiring the Providence Museum in 1887 (Providence, Rhode Island), Low's Opera House (Providence) in 1888, the Bijou (Philadelphia) in 1888, and Union Square Theatre (New York City) in 1893. In 1894, he opened Keith's Theatre in Boston. In 1900, he purchased the Princess Theatre in London. In 1906, Keith merged his New York and New Jersey theatres with Frederick Freeman Proctor, but dissolved the partnership five years later.

On February 11, 1907, the United Booking Office of America was formed by B. F. Keith, F. F. Proctor, Edward F. Albee, and A. Paul Keith of Keith & Proctor and Percy G. Williams and Oscar Hammerstein. The two sides maintained ownership of their respective theaters and agreed not to compete with each other, with Keith & Proctor controlling vaudeville bookings in Boston and Philadelphia and Williams and Hammerstein controlling New York City. In 1909, Keith, Proctor, Williams, and Hammerstein formed the United Theatres Securities Co. with fellow theater owners Harry Davis of Pittsburgh, Michael Shea of Toronto, P. B. Chase of Washington, D.C., James H. Moore of Rochester, New York, and James C. Duffield and James Dyment of Canada. This gave the United Booking Office control over 100 theaters. In 1911, the United Booking Office reached an agreement with Martin Beck, which gave the United Booking Office control of vaudeville theaters in the east and Beck's Orpheum Circuit control of the west. In 1912, Keith purchased Williams's eight New York City theaters (Bronx, Greenpoint, Gotham, Crescent, Bushwick, Colonial, Orpheum, and Alhambra).

Prior to Keith's death in 1914, his 29 theaters were acquired by his son, A. Paul Keith, and the circuit's longtime general manager, Edward F. Albee. Albee took full control following the younger Keith's death in 1918.

In 1928, the theaters owned by Albee and the Orpheum Circuit merged to form the Keith-Albee-Orpheum circuit. The combined theater chain now had over 700 theaters in the United States and Canada. They had a combined seating capacity 1.5 million. 15,000 vaudeville performers will be booked through the new entity.

== Theaters ==
- Allegheny Theatre, Philadelphia
- B.F. Keith Theater, Louisville
- B.F. Keith's Theatre, Atlantic City, New Jersey
- B.F. Keith's Theatre, Lowell, Massachusetts
- Bijou Theatre, Boston
- Bijou Theatre, Jersey City, New Jersey
- Bronx Theatre, New York City
- Bushwick Theater, New York City
- Colonial Theatre, New York City
- Crescent Theater, New York City
- Gotham Theater, New York City
- The Harlem Alhambra, New York City
- Harlem Opera House, New York City
- Hippodrome Theater, Cleveland
- Jersey City Theatre, Jersey City
- Keith's New Theatre, Providence, Rhode Island
- Keith's New Theatre, Pawtucket, Rhode Island
- Keith's Theatre, Boston
- Keith's Theatre, Cincinnati
- Keith's Theater, Columbus, Ohio
- Keith's Theater, Indianapolis
- Keith's Theatre, Philadelphia
- Keith's Theater, Portland, Maine
- Keith's Theater, Washington, D.C.
- Palace Theatre, New York City
- Prospect Theatre, Cleveland
- Union Square Theatre, New York City

== Notable performers ==
- Rita Bell (1893–1992), singer, entertainer

== See also ==
- Orpheum Circuit
- Chitlin' Circuit
- Borscht Belt
