= A. Paul Keith =

American vaudeville theater owner

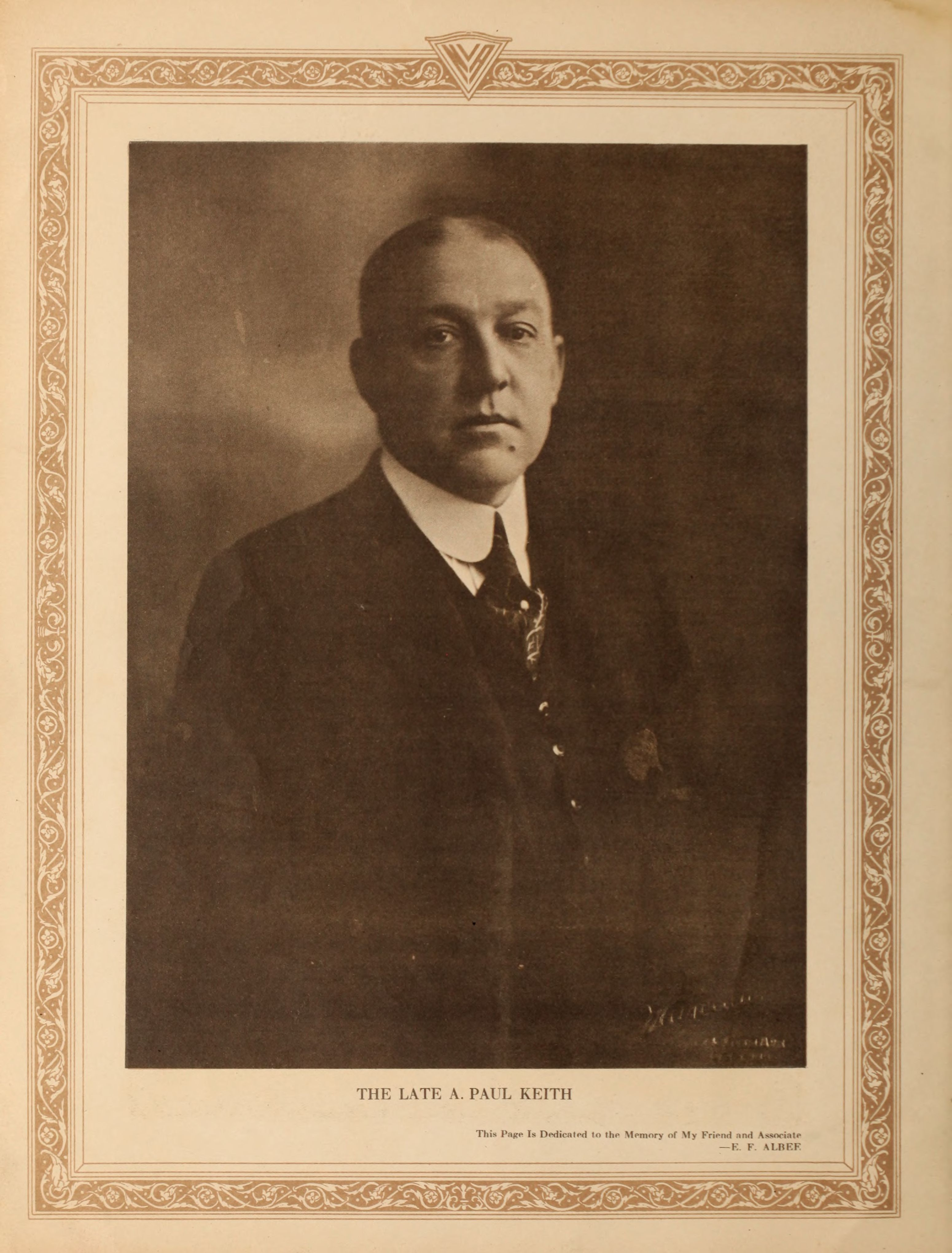
- Born: Andrew Paul Keith; January 3, 1875; New York, New York, U.S.
- Died: October 30, 1918 (aged 43); New York, New York, U.S.
- Education: Harvard College
- Occupation: Theater owner

Andrew Paul Keith (January 3, 1875 – October 30, 1918) was an American vaudeville theater owner who took over the B. F. Keith Circuit following the death of his father, Benjamin Franklin Keith.

== Biography ==
Keith began working in the theater at a young age and in 1893 was put in charge of bookings for Keith's Theatre, which opened the following year. He graduated from Harvard College in 1901.

By 1905, he was the assistant general manager of the Keith chain. When he turned 30, his father gifted him the Bijou Theatre in Philadelphia. In 1906, B. F. Keith combined his New York and New Jersey assets with those of F. F. Proctor to create the Keith and Proctor Amusement Company. A. Paul Keith served as treasurer of Keith & Proctor until the partnership was dissolved in 1911. In 1907, Keith became secretary–treasurer of the United Booking Office of America, which was a partnership between Keith & Proctor and Percy G. Williams and Oscar Hammerstein. In 1908, Keith served as acting general manager of the United Booking Office while E. F. Albee recovered from injuries suffered in an automobile accident.

Prior to his father's death in 1914, Keith and Edward F. Albee acquired control of the Keith circuit's 29 theaters. The pair also owned a chain of movie theaters.

In 1915, Keith was elected president of the Boston Athletic Association.

On October 25, 1918, Keith came down with the Spanish flu. He died on October 30, 1918, at the home of a business associate. He left an estate worth $3.8 million.($82,850,000 in 2025 dollars), A lifelong bachelor, his business holdings were inherited by Albee and other business partners, while his personal assets were given to Cardinal William Henry O'Connell and Harvard College. O'Connell used the money to create the Keith Academy and Keith Hall in Lowell, Massachusetts.
