= White Rats of America =

Labor union for male vaudeville performers

The White Rats
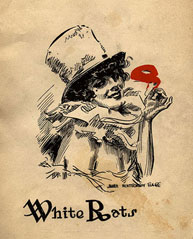
- Program cover for the 16 March 1915 Masque Ball of the White Rats Actors' Union of America
- Founded: 1900
- Headquarters: New York City, US
- Location: United States
- Affiliations: American Federation of Labor

The White Rats was a fraternal organization formed in the United States by vaudeville performers, led by George Fuller Golden, as a labor union to support the rights of male performers. Women and African-American performers were not allowed to join. The White Rats attempted to combat the monopolistic practices of the United Booking Office (UBO) and the Vaudeville Managers Association (VMA), groups formed by vaudeville theater managers to keep performers' wages low and control when and where performers were allowed to work. It was based on the Grand Order of Water Rats, a British entertainment industry fraternity and charity. It received a charter from the American Federation of Labor in 1910. The union staged several strikes but ultimately disbanded.

== Membership ==
Golden wrote a book about the White Rats, My Lady Vaudeville and Her White Rats, which was published in 1909 by the Broadway Publishing Company. This book lists the following members:

- George Fuller Golden, President
- Ezra Kendall, Secretary and Treasurer

Directors:

- David C. Montgomery
- John L. Rixford
- Mark P. Murphy
- Junie McCree
- Fred Stone
- Horace Goldin
- James F. Dolan
- Frank Gardiner
- Charles T. Aldrich
- George B. Reno
- George Felix
- Ren Shields
- George W. Monroe
- Sam Morton
- Walter Leroy
- M. J. Sullivan
- Nat M. Wills
- Chas. McDonald
- Harry Hayes
- Joe Birnes
- Harry Luken
- Eddie Foy
- Bobby Gaylor
- George Evans
- Todd Judge
- Fred Niblo
- Felix Patty

Only white male performers were allowed to join.

== Meeting places ==
The White Rats met on Twenty-third street in New York City, in a space above Koster & Bial's Music Hall between Broadway and Sixth Avenue.

== Strike of 1901 ==
Soon after the White Rats union was formed in 1900, its leadership committee attempted to negotiate with the VMA, led by E.F. Albee and B.F. Keith, to reduce or remove a 5% kickback each act was forced to pay in exchange for being booked on the lucrative VMA circuit. After negotiations failed, the White Rats called a strike in February 1901.

The Western States branch of the VMA gave in to the union's demands, and the Eastern branch went without vaudeville for two weeks. Keith and Albee called a meeting with the performers in which they claimed they themselves had been against the 5% commission, and would ask the other members of the VMA to remove it. Albee and Keith also agreed to go on the record in the press as being against the 5% commission if the strike was called off, and they did so. As a result, the strike was called off, and performers began to sign contracts with the VMA again in order to secure valuable long-term performing contracts.

== Strike of 1916 ==
The White Rats staged a strike in 1916 to protest poor treatment by vaudeville bookers. In retaliation, Vaudeville managers, led by Albee, created a blacklist that prevented any known members of the White Rats from working in any of the 10,000 to 15,000 theaters under his control. Performers often couldn't afford to be out of work, or to work at a reduced rate because of suspected union membership, and the strike collapsed within a year. The White Rats disbanded not long thereafter.

== See also ==
- List of vaudeville performers: A–K
- List of vaudeville performers: L–Z
