= Vaudeville Managers Association =

Former American cartel of vaudeville theater managers

Vaudeville Managers Association / Western Vaudeville Managers Association
- Formation: 1900 / 1903
- Dissolved: 1927
- Type: Association
- Legal status: Defunct
- Purpose: Vaudeville booking
- Headquarters: Boston / Chicago
- Region served: United States
- Official language: English

The Vaudeville Managers Association (VMA) was a cartel of managers of American vaudeville theaters established in 1900, dominated by the Boston-based Keith-Albee chain. Soon afterwards the Western Vaudeville Managers Association (WVMA) was formed as a cartel of theater owners in Chicago and the west, dominated by the Orpheum Circuit. Although rivals, the two organizations collaborated in booking acts and dealing with the performers' union, the White Rats. By 1913 Edward Franklin Albee II had effective control over both the VMA and WVMA. In the 1920s vaudeville went into decline, unable to compete with film. In 1927 the Keith-Albee and Orpheum chains merged. The next year they became part of RKO Pictures.

== Background ==
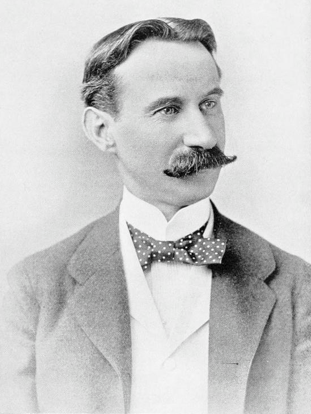
Edward F Albee in 1894

The Theatrical Syndicate was formed in 1896 by Marcus Klaw, A. L. Erlanger Charles Frohman, Al Hayman, Samuel F. Nixon and Fred Zimmerman. Between them they controlled three quarters of the legitimate theaters. Touring companies who booked through the syndicate had to play only in syndicate theaters. Although the syndicate never achieved a monopoly, by 1903 it controlled most first class theater productions.

In 1900 Pat Shea of Buffalo proposed to Benjamin Franklin Keith and Edward Franklin Albee II of Boston that they should set up a similar arrangement for vaudeville. They called a meeting in May 1900 in Boston of most of the major vaudeville managers, including Weber & Fields, Tony Pastor, Hyde & Behman of Brooklyn, Kohl & Castle, Colonel J.D. Hopkins, and Meyerfield & Beck of the Orpheum Circuit of the western USA. They did not invite Frederick Freeman Proctor, Keith's main competitor, but the other managers objected to this and insisted on a meeting in New York where Proctor was invited. The Vaudeville Managers Association (VMA) was founded at the New York meeting. Keith and Albee dominated the new organization.

The purpose of the Vaudeville Managers Association was to end bidding wars for popular acts and eliminate competition between managers for the same audience. The VMA central booking office would arrange all bookings for touring performers in exchange for 5% of their pay. The ground rules for what would become the United Booking Office (UBO) were thrashed out in the VMA meetings. Essentially the VMA was a "monopsony", where a single employer dominates the labor market. Since the theater managers controlled the VMA, they determined the pay and conditions.

Under the new system, acts were booked individually. This forced the break-up of vaudeville companies run by producers who arranged complete travelling shows. On the positive side, performers who paid their dues gained access to the best theaters, with schedules that minimized travel distances and gaps in engagements.

== History ==
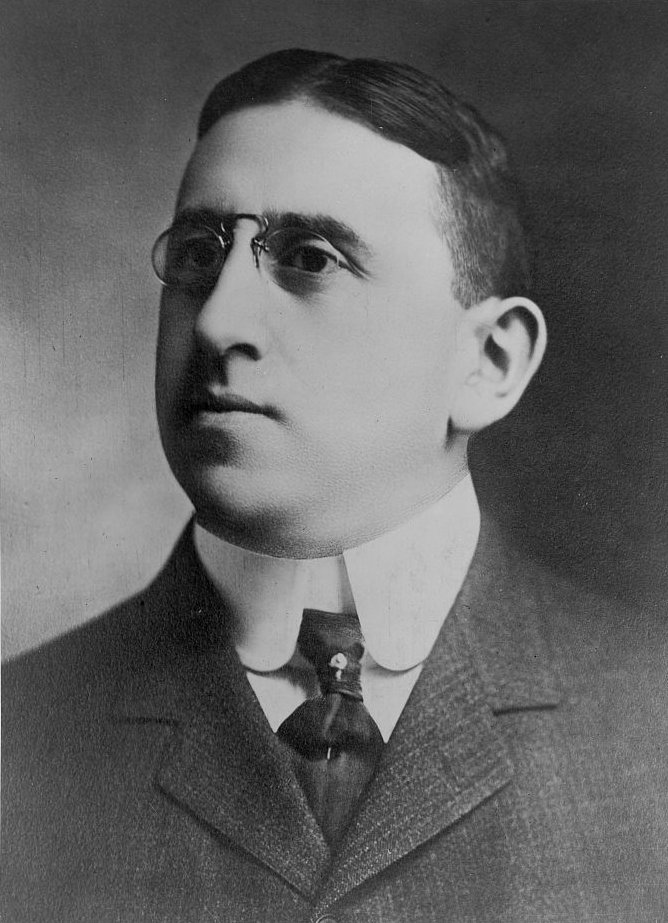
Martin Beck, head of the Orpheum Circuit

The theater managers continued to act independently in setting pay and competing for turf, so the main goals of the VMA were not achieved. After about a year F.F. Proctor left and started booking his own acts. Percy G. Williams of Brooklyn refused to join, so the monopoly was not complete. The Western Managers Association (WMA) originated in 1903 when Meyerfield & Beck of the Orpheum arranged to provide bookings for the Sullivan & Considine theaters in the northwest. Various small-time circuits signed up to the WMA for bookings.

The UBO was eventually incorporated in 1906, with the stated aim of eliminating inefficiencies and making sure there was enough proven talent to meet demand. It served the Keith-Albee circuit and many small-time theaters. The UBO had a powerful position. An agent would struggle to get enough bookings for his performers unless he signed up to the UBO, and a theater manager would have difficulty finding enough acts for his shows except by going through the UBO.

The Western Vaudeville Managers Association (WVMA) came into existence when John J. Murdock of Chicago joined up with Beck and others, and blocked expansion of Albee's UBO to Chicago and the west. In a compromise, Martin Beck agreed to book acts for the Orpheum Circuit through the UBO. It was agreed that the WVMA would handle all bookings to the west of the Mississippi and the UBO would handle all bookings to the east. In Chicago the WVMA had arrangements with both the Keith-Albee and the Orpheum. This meant that acts could arrange coast-to-coast tours through one agency.

In 1905 the Orpheum Circuit had seventeen theaters. By 1909 it had grown to twenty-seven theatres. Although the booking agreement held, the two main chains threatened to encroach on each other's territory. In 1911 Beck announced that he was building the Palace Theater on Broadway in Manhattan. In response Albee announced he was building theaters in San Francisco and Los Angeles. Only the Palace was built, and Albee and Keith managed to gain control of it. Albee had secretly acquired 51% of the Orpheum Circuit.

In 1913 the WVMA included over ten circuits and supplied shows to over 300 theaters, mostly in the Midwest, South and West, although it advertised national coverage. The chains included the Orpheum, Gus Sun, Butterfield, Allardt, Theilen, Finn & Heiman and Interstate. The WVMA imposed strict rules, as did the Keith-Albee circuit, to ensure that the shows were suitable for family audiences. "Everything of a vulgar, suggestive, profane or sacrilegious nature is forbidden..." The USA had 2,973 large and small vaudeville theaters by 1913. By 1915 Keith-Albee controlled about 1,500 theaters through the UBO. They imposed their terms on acts, and disciplined those that were late or caused other problems. Most performers had to accept the conditions if they wanted to play big-time theaters. Edward Paycen Churchill was the WVMA's general manager for many years.

== Union relations ==
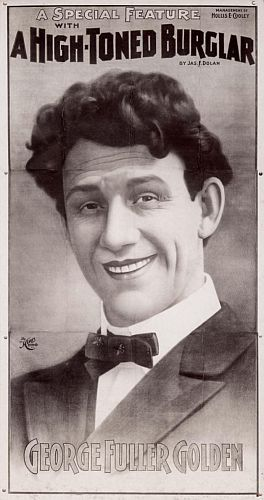
George Fuller Golden, founder of the White Rats

Almost immediately after the VMA was founded the performers responded by forming a union named the White Rats, led by the comedian George Fuller Golden. The White Rats only admitted white males as members. The performers demanded abolition of the 5% commission and went on strike in 1901 after failed negotiations. The Western managers quickly accepted their conditions. Keith met with representatives of the performers and promised to arrange with the other managers for improved conditions. The strike fizzled out with only minor gains.

In 1910 the White Rats was granted a charter by the American Federation of Labor led by Samuel Gompers. In 1911 Albee met with representatives of the Colored Vaudeville Benevolent Association. He told them there was no need for the colored artist to join a union to get work. The managers would look after their interests. Any artist who joined the union would be blacklisted. A hostile report of the meeting in the New York Age asked performers "Does Mr. Albee give you an equitable contract, or does he simply promise to do it? ... Does Mr. Albee treat you like he treats all other artist, like dirt...?"

Albee had a blacklist prepared by John J. Murdock, now his general manager, of all known White Rats. None of them could be employed on a Keith or Orpheum circuit.

The Vaudeville Managers Protective Association (VMPA) was formed to enforce the blacklist.

== National Vaudeville Artists ==
Albee set up the National Vaudeville Artists (NVA) as an alternative union under his control. Performers who wanted bookings on the Keith or Orpheum circuits had to warrant that they were NVA members.

In 1916, Harry Mountford of the White Rats organized a strike against the UBO that began in Oklahoma City and then spread to Boston and New York. The strikes failed and the White Rats went bankrupt. In May 1918 the Federal Trade Commission charged that the Vaudeville Managers Protective Association was an illegal combination operating in restraint of trade. It dominated big-time vaudeville, forced performers to pay excessive fees and punished union members through the blacklist. The FTC also named the NVA, UBO and the Keith Vaudeville Collection Agency. Marcus Loew, who had regional agencies for Famous Players and Universal Pictures, was seen as a co-conspirator by the government because many of the Keith theaters showed Loew-controlled films. The only result of the hearings was that the VMPA agreed to drop the requirement for a performer to belong to the NVA to obtain bookings.

In 1919 Albee acquired the former White Rats clubhouse as NVA headquarters. National Vaudeville Artists Club was at 229 West 46th Street. Cary Grant performed there, doing comic sketches, juggling, performing acrobatics, and as "Rubber Legs", riding a unicycle.

In March 1924 an article in Equity magazine (Actors' Equity Association) said the NVA "was formed so that the vaudeville artists could be herded into an organization under the control of the vaudeville managers. The N.V.A. is a lightning rod down which the collective strength of the vaudeville actor runs harmlessly into the ground."

Kennedy Cottage, at Saranac Lake, New York, a 1897 "cure cottage" was used by the National Vaudeville Artists Philanthropic Association prior to the construction of the National Vaudeville Artists Tuberculosis Sanitarium.

In the 1920s a small hospital/lodge was built in Saranac Lake, New York, for performers ailing from tuberculosis and other respiratory ailments. Later a larger hospital was built in the mid to late 1920s. It was called the National Vaudeville Artist Lodge. After the NVA went bankrupt and merged with what later became RKO in the 1930s, the hospital was renamed the Will Rogers Memorial Hospital. The Tudor mansion still stands today as a retirement home. It was painstakingly restored and looks exactly as it did when it was originally built.

Funds for the building and the upkeep of the hospital were raising through annual benefits in which many artists performed. To commemorate these efforts, souvenir books were created, featuring photographs of the many performers, a list of who was performing, cartoons, and poems written by performers.

Stella Mayhew married singer and composer Billie Taylor; they divorced in 1922. Mayhew lost her house in Beechhurst, New York, and her life savings, in the stockmarket crash in 1929, and she died "penniless" in 1934, aged 59 years, in t

By 1934, there was a National Vaudeville Artists' Ward at French Hospital, in Manhattan, which cared for Stella Mayhew.

Vaudevillians safeguarded some of their specialties by submitting detailed descriptions and diagrams to National Vaudeville Artists, Inc.'s Protected Material Department, "extensively used for years by the creators of gags, routines, skits, stunts, and unique specialties." Fellow vaudeville comedian Fred Allen described the procedure in his memoir:

"Any member could protect his act. All he had to do was to enclose a copy of his material in a sealed envelope and deliver it to the N.V.A. office. The envelope was placed in the Protected Material files. Later, if a plagiarist was brought to bay, the act preferred charges, the sealed envelope was opened, and the N.V.A. officials dispensed justice. Hundreds of acts protected their material through this service. After Albee's death, vaudeville started over the hill and took the N.V.A. club with it."

The N.V.A. office finally discontinued the Protected Material Department on September 15, 1947, "owing to lack of space." The originators of the material were invited to claim it in person; after 30 days the N.V.A. would dispose of the files left unclaimed. Ole Olsen remembered the storehouse of gags contained in the files, and purchased all of the remaining material that had been abandoned.

== Decline and dissolution ==
In 1929 the National Vaudeville Artists was taken in a hostile move by Joseph Kennedy. He kept Albee only as a figure head. One day Albee had an idea and was immediately told "You are nothing". A year and half later Albee died.

Some of the theaters began offering combinations of film and vaudeville, or film only. By 1925 the Albee-Keith chain was down to 350 theaters. By 1926 there were only twelve theaters dedicated to big-time vaudeville.

In 1927 the Orpheum merged with the Keith-Albee chain. In October 1928 the consolidated Keith-Albee-Orpheum company combined with the Radio Corporation of America and the Film Booking Office. The new company was called Radio-Keith-Orpheum (RKO). The former vaudeville theaters became cinemas.
