= Rita Bell =

American singer and entertainer (1893–1992)

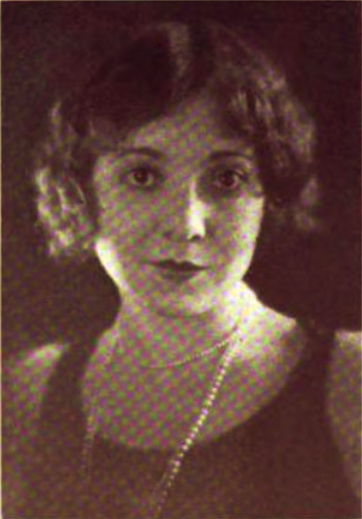
- Bell in a 1924 publication

Background information
- Born: Marguerite Hughes Bell; December 16, 1893; Stratton, Nebraska, U.S.
- Died: January 8, 1992 (aged 98) Great Neck, New York, U.S.
- Genres: vaudeville; musical theatre; radio; "talkies"
- Occupations: singer; songwriter; entertainer
- Instruments: piano
- Spouses: Nathaniel Brittan Crittenden (m. 1923, divorced); Edwin Theodore Redlich (m. 1940; died 1962)

Rita Bell (née, Bell; after first marriage, Crittenden; after second marriage, Redlich; December 16, 1893 – January 8, 1992) was an American lyric soprano and entertainer in vaudeville, musical theatre, radio, and "talkies". She was the principal actress of several Broadway musicals, such as "The Gingham Girl" and "Spice of Life". During her world tour, her singing voice and personality were broadcast from radio stations in Amsterdam, Berlin, Cape Town, and London. A singer-songwriter, Bell wrote many of her songs.

== Early life and education ==
Marguerite (nickname, "Rita") Hughes Bell was born in Stratton, Nebraska, December 16, 1893. Her parents were S. Warren Bell and Alice Hughes.

Her early education was in the public schools of Nebraska and Iowa. Bell sang her first part in an amateur performance in Iowa City, Iowa. From the time when she was a child in grade school, she liked to sing the popular songs which her uncle, Winfield Hughes, had in his music store in Iowa City. Bell came to Saint Paul, Minnesota when 13 years of age. She attended Central High School and performed in the school's Glee Club. She then attended the University of Iowa.

"If you want to be a successful actress go to college. If you can tell a theatrical manager you have a bachelor of arts degree from a college or university of high standards, you go up in his estimation... I know that academic training for the stage has long been neglected -at least it hasn't been recognized- but that doesn't make it one bit less important. The girl who has a firm foundation of liberal arts training has as great an advantage in musical comedy, vaudeville or serious drama... Foreign languages, music and dancing are subjects which should be studied and are particularly necessary for stage work."

Bell won distinction in Iowa City singing the part of "Hebe" in Gilbert and Sullivan's H.M.S. Pinafore, a part which her mother, then Miss Alice Hughes, had sung 20 years before opposite the same basso, Frank Sueppel. From that time on, no production in the vicinity was considered complete without Bell. Though she was a pupil of Marie de Santo Riedel at the University of Iowa's School of Music at the time, her practice did not take up all her energy. Bell organized a quartet including Grace Pfannebecker, Nita Stamp, Esther Thomann, and herself, touring Iowa on chautauquas and winter concerts.

== Career ==
She continued with amateur work while singing soprano at Peoples church. Bell also did one summer season in musical stock and light opera at Fairmont, Minnesota.

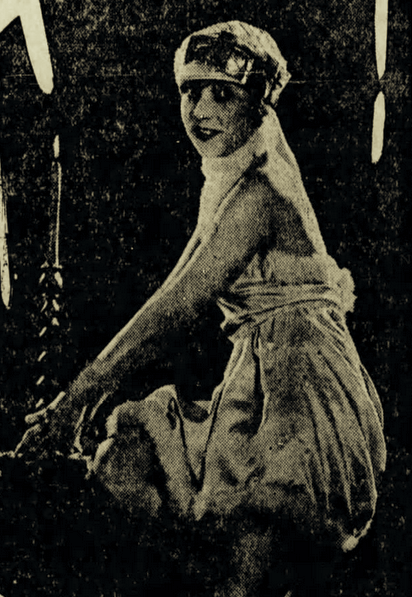
Rita Bell as she appeared in a vaudeville sketch written for her by Jack Lait.

The following fall, she had her first professional vaudeville offer, the "West Coast on Pantages" which took her to the Pacific coast. After filling some picture engagements in the west, she returned to vaudeville in a sketch written for her by Jack Lait. This act was extremely popular in the east on the "Keith" circuit. She left vaudeville in 1920 to concentrate on music comedy roles, on the East coast. She scored an immediate success, appearing as the ingenue soprano in The Spice of Life. She was cast for a lead in the 1922 Ziegfeld Follies, also John Cort's "Go-Go" and Harry Delf's "Sun Showers", but opted instead for the 1922 New York City production of The Gingham Girl where Bell played the entire run of the production in the title role. After it closed for the summer, Bell toured the Canadian Rockies and returned to St. Paul where she appeared in a musical interlude, The Butterfly Girl. She was booked for a leading role in Gus Edwards "Sunbonnet Sue" and "No, No, Nonette", but retired.

Bell appeared in numerous benefit performances, in "Jappyland", at the St. Paul auditorium (now, Roy Wilkins Auditorium), 1911; benefits for House of Hope and First Baptist church; and in entertainments for the wounded at Fort Snelling during World War I.

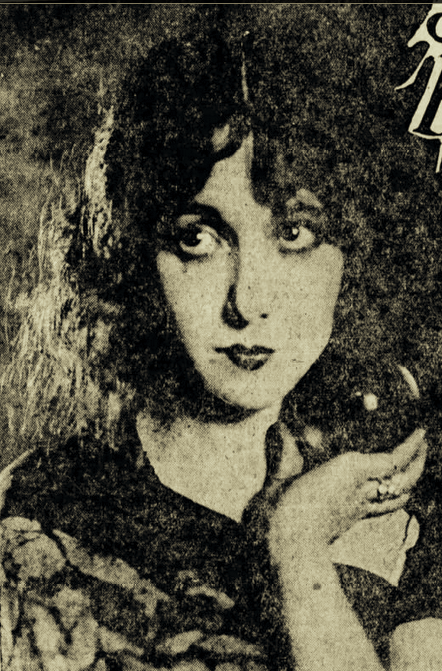
Rita Bell (1923)

She belonged to Central High School Glee Club, House of Hope Christian Endeavor Society, National Vaudeville Artists of New York City, Brahms Club of New York City and Women's National Democratic Club. Since her residence in New York, Bell worked on a committee for New York Music week, 1924. Bell directed a benefit for Judson Memorial Church and Health Center, and did social work at the center among young Italian girls. Bell served on the board of director of Brandeis University, and was Vice-president of the New York Gourmet Society. She founded the Community Concert Association in Great Neck, New York.

In France, Bell became a protege of Anna Calve. From France, she went to England and after singing there, received a contract to perform in South African radio. While traveling in South Africa, she wrote articles on diamond mines, as well as the people and customs of the country. In 1929, she returned to vaudeville, with performances scheduled in the Netherlands, Berlin, and Vienna. She also performed in Shanghai and Hong Kong. in 1939, she was a pianist-singer at a restaurant in Brooklyn.

Around 1940, Bell began appearing in USO shows. By 1972, she had made more than 2,000 benefit performances.

== Personal life ==
On September 15, 1923, she married Nathaniel Brittan Crittenden (1890-1958) of New York; At some point they divorced. On April 5, 1940, in Warrenton, Virginia, she married Edwin Theodore Redlich (1895-1962). The couple made their home on Long Island, in Freeport, New York.

In her later years, Rita Bell remained on Long Island and made her home in Great Neck, where she died January 8, 1992.
