= George Fuller Golden =

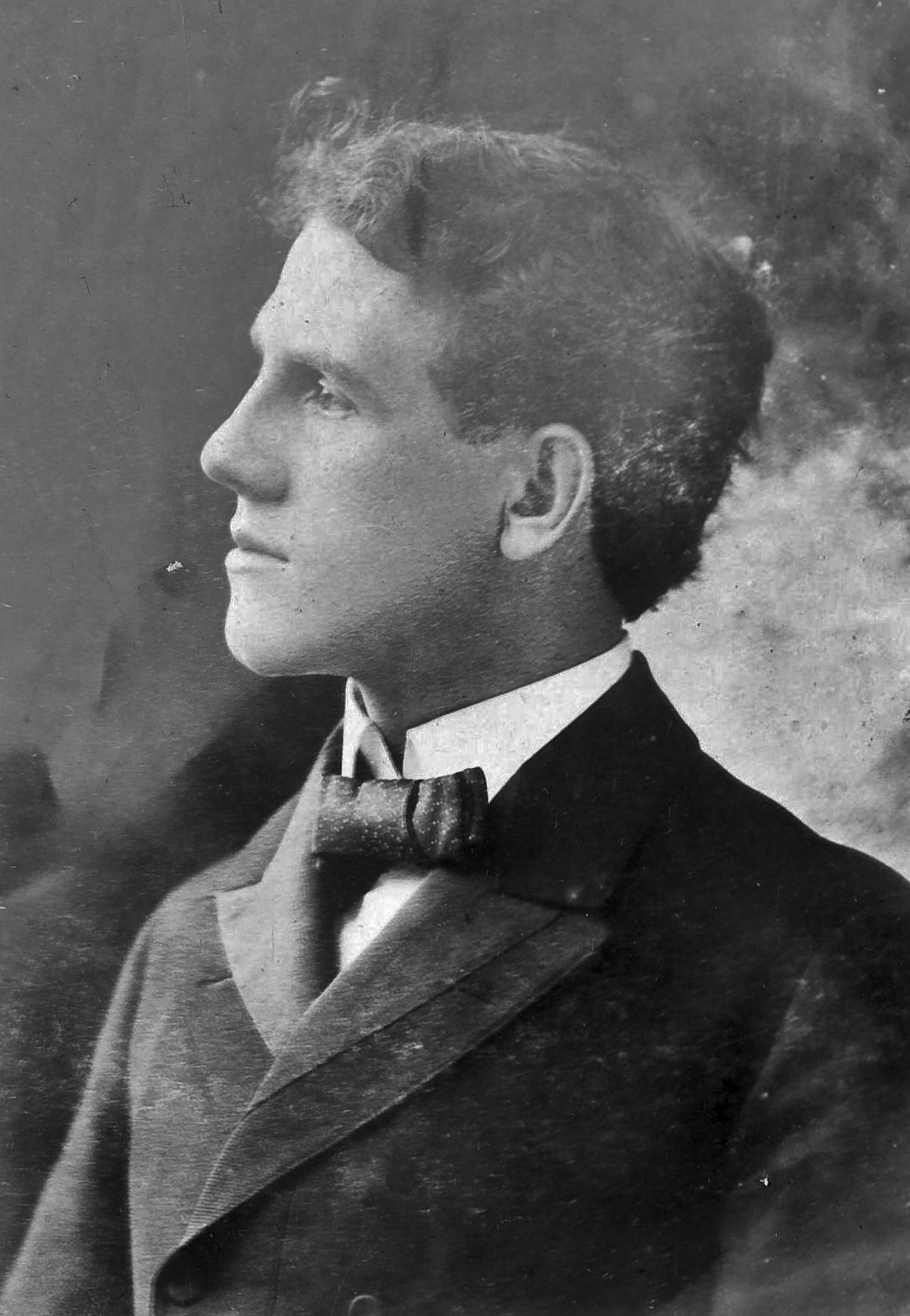

Background information
- Born: George Michael Fuller; 1868
- Died: February 17, 1912 (aged 43–44)
- Genres: vaudeville

George Fuller Golden (1868 – February 17, 1912), was a popular vaudeville entertainer at the beginning of the 20th century. He is best known for his monologues about his fictional friend Casey. He was also a prizefighter. He was the founder of the White Rats, a labor union for vaudeville performers.

== Performing career ==
=== Notable stage appearances ===
Broadway appearances

- Nell-Go-In, Oct 31, 1900 – Nov 17, 1900
- The Supper Club, Dec 23, 1901 – Jan 25, 1902, roles: Boss Thomas, Master of Ceremonies

== Formation of White Rats ==
Golden was performing in London in 1899 when his wife became sick and he was unable to work. The Water Rats, a British entertainment charity, helped him with his expenses and with securing travel back to the United States.

When the Vaudeville Managers Association (VMA) formed in 1900, and began demanding a 5% kickback from all performers in exchange for steady bookings, Golden called on his experience with the Water Rats to form the White Rats as a labor union for performers. The White Rats attempted to negotiate with the VMA, led by E.F. Albee and B.F. Keith, to reduce or remove the kickback. After negotiations failed, the White Rats called a strike in February 1901. Vaudeville performers all over the United States refused to work. Many claimed they were sick.

The Western States branch of the VMA gave in to the union's demands, and the Eastern branch went without vaudeville for two weeks. Some theaters shut down completely, others booked replacement acts. Keith and Albee called a meeting with the White Rats in which they claimed they themselves had been against the 5% commission, and would ask the other members of the VMA to remove it. Albee and Keith also agreed to go on the record in the press as being against the 5% commission if the strike was called off, and they did so. As a result, the strike was called off, and performers began to sign contracts with the VMA again in order to secure valuable long-term performing contracts.

Golden wrote a book about the White Rats, My Lady Vaudeville and her White Rats, which was published in 1909 by the Broadway Publishing Company.

The White Rats received a charter from the American Federation of Labor in 1910. However, the union was unable to manage funds efficiently, and lost members because many performers did not want to pay dues to the union in addition to paying the vaudeville managers.

== Personal life ==
Golden had three daughters.

Olive Fuller Golden was born in New York on January 31, 1896. She became a film actress and married fellow performer Harry Carey in 1916. She went on to star in movies and television shows under her married name, Olive Carey. She died on March 13, 1988, in California.

Ruth Fuller Golden was born May 19, 1901, in New York and was a film actress in 1919 and 1920. She died on August 15, 1931, in California.

Mignonne Golden was born on February 27, 1904, in London. She also became a film actress for a few years in the 1920s. She died in New York on September 22, 1997.

== Death ==
Golden died of tuberculosis on February 17, 1912.
