= Edward Churchill =

Edward Churchill may refer to:

- Edward Delos Churchill, American surgeon
- Edward Paycen Churchill, American theatre impresario, theatre manager, and talent agent
