= Stratton, Nebraska =

Village in Hitchcock County, Nebraska, United States

- Village
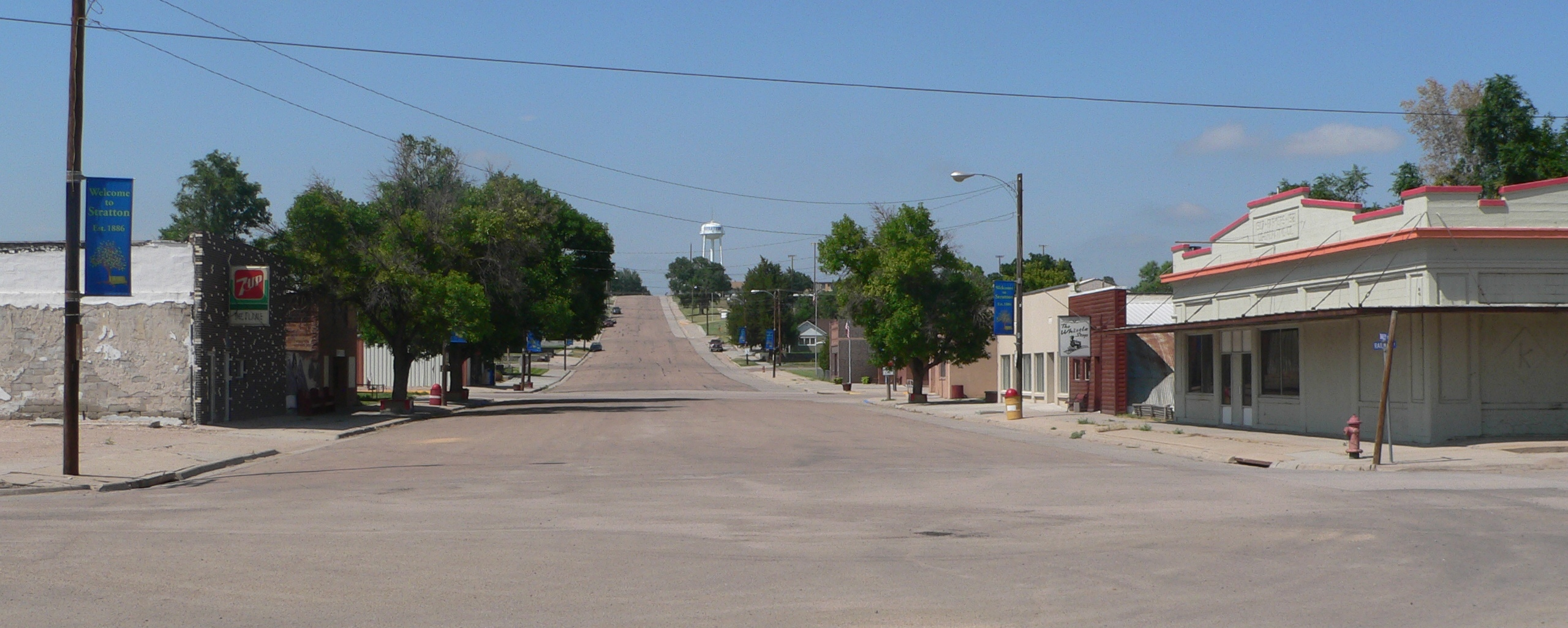
- Downtown Stratton: Bailey Street, looking north

- Location of Stratton, Nebraska
- Coordinates: 40°09′01″N 101°13′41″W
- Country: United States
- State: Nebraska
- County: Hitchcock

Area
  - Total: 0.43 sq mi (1.12 km^{2})
  - Land: 0.43 sq mi (1.12 km^{2})
  - Water: 0 sq mi (0.00 km^{2})
- Elevation: 2,828 ft (862 m)

Population (2020)
  - Total: 310
  - Density: 719.3/sq mi (277.71/km^{2})
- Time zone: UTC-6 (Central (CST))
  - Summer (DST): UTC-5 (CDT)
- ZIP code: 69043
- Area code: 308
- FIPS code: 31-47395
- GNIS feature ID: 2399918
- Website: www.strattonnebraska.com

Stratton is a village in Hitchcock County, Nebraska, United States. The population was 310 at the 2020 census.

== History ==
Stratton sprang up circa 1881 as a depot on the Chicago, Burlington and Quincy Railroad. It was named for Mary Stratton, an original owner of the town site.

== Geography ==
According to the United States Census Bureau, the village has a total area of 0.43 square miles (1.11 km^{2}), all land.

== Demographics ==
Historical population
| Census | Pop. | Note | %± |
|---|---|---|---|
| 1890 | 326 | | — |
| 1900 | 225 | | −31.0% |
| 1910 | 367 | | 63.1% |
| 1920 | 509 | | 38.7% |
| 1930 | 663 | | 30.3% |
| 1940 | 630 | | −5.0% |
| 1950 | 628 | | −0.3% |
| 1960 | 492 | | −21.7% |
| 1970 | 481 | | −2.2% |
| 1980 | 499 | | 3.7% |
| 1990 | 427 | | −14.4% |
| 2000 | 396 | | −7.3% |
| 2010 | 343 | | −13.4% |
| 2020 | 310 | | −9.6% |
U.S. Decennial Census

=== 2010 census ===
As of the census of 2010, there were 343 people, 168 households, and 99 families residing in the village. The population density was 797.7 inhabitants per square mile (308.0/km^{2}). There were 217 housing units at an average density of 504.7 per square mile (194.9/km^{2}). The racial makeup of the village was 95.0% White, 0.9% Native American, 0.3% Asian, 0.3% from other races, and 3.5% from two or more races. Hispanic or Latino of any race were 0.9% of the population.

There were 168 households, of which 19.6% had children under the age of 18 living with them, 49.4% were married couples living together, 6.0% had a female householder with no husband present, 3.6% had a male householder with no wife present, and 41.1% were non-families. 40.5% of all households were made up of individuals, and 25% had someone living alone who was 65 years of age or older. The average household size was 2.04 and the average family size was 2.72.

The median age in the village was 52.5 years. 19.8% of residents were under the age of 18; 4.7% were between the ages of 18 and 24; 16.6% were from 25 to 44; 27.1% were from 45 to 64; and 31.8% were 65 years of age or older. The gender makeup of the village was 49.0% male and 51.0% female.

=== 2000 census ===
As of the census of 2000, there were 396 people, 174 households, and 116 families residing in the village. The population density was 882.8 inhabitants per square mile (340.9/km^{2}). There were 205 housing units at an average density of 457.0 per square mile (176.4/km^{2}). The racial makeup of the village was 97.98% White, 1.26% Native American, 0.25% Asian, and 0.51% from two or more races. Hispanic or Latino of any race were 0.51% of the population.

There were 174 households, out of which 24.7% had children under the age of 18 living with them, 59.8% were married couples living together, 5.7% had a female householder with no husband present, and 32.8% were non-families. 31.6% of all households were made up of individuals, and 23.6% had someone living alone who was 65 years of age or older. The average household size was 2.28 and the average family size was 2.85.

In the village, the population was spread out, with 22.7% under the age of 18, 4.5% from 18 to 24, 18.4% from 25 to 44, 25.0% from 45 to 64, and 29.3% who were 65 years of age or older. The median age was 47 years. For every 100 females, there were 102.0 males. For every 100 females age 18 and over, there were 87.7 males.

As of 2000 the median income for a household in the village was $25,375, and the median income for a family was $32,656. Males had a median income of $18,500 versus $17,250 for females. The per capita income for the village was $15,139. About 8.4% of families and 12.7% of the population were below the poverty line, including 20.0% of those under age 18 and 9.9% of those age 65 or over.

== Notable people ==
- Rita Bell (1893-1992), American singer
- Jim Lankas, American football player
- George Sauer, American football coach

== See also ==
- List of municipalities in Nebraska
