= Harry Carey (actor) =

American actor (1878–1947)

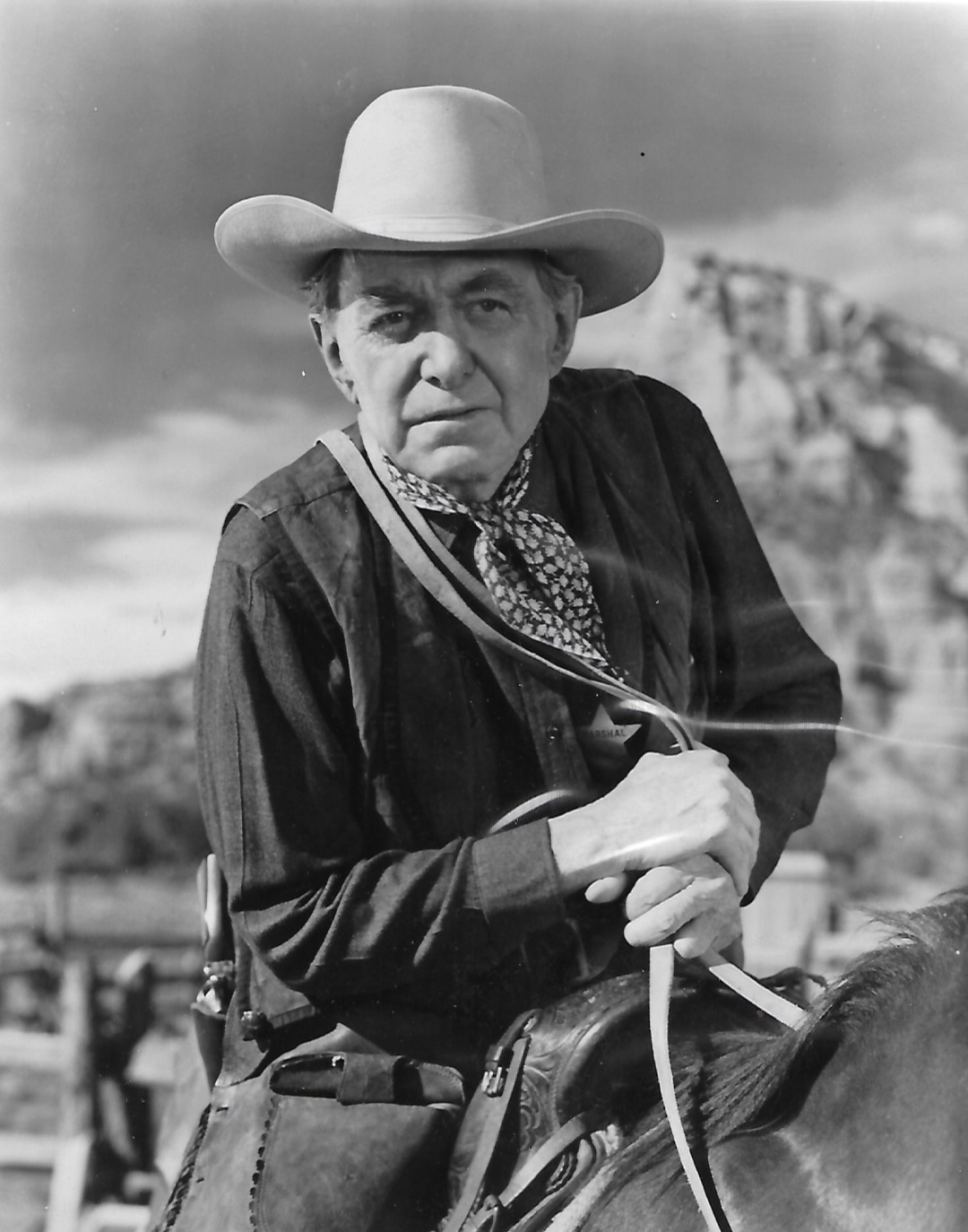
- Carey in Angel and the Badman (1947)
- Born: Henry DeWitt Carey II; January 16, 1878; New York City, U.S.
- Died: September 21, 1947 (aged 69); Los Angeles, California, U.S.
- Resting place: Woodlawn Cemetery, The Bronx, New York City
- Education: New York University
- Occupation: Actor
- Years active: 1909–1947
- Spouse: Olive Fuller Golden (m. 1920)
- Children: 2, including Harry Carey Jr.

Henry DeWitt Carey II (January 16, 1878 – September 21, 1947) was an American actor and one of silent film's earliest superstars, usually cast as a Western hero. One of his best-known performances is as the president of the United States Senate in the drama film Mr. Smith Goes to Washington (1939), for which he was nominated for the Academy Award for Best Supporting Actor. He was the father of Harry Carey Jr., who was also a prominent actor.

== Early life ==
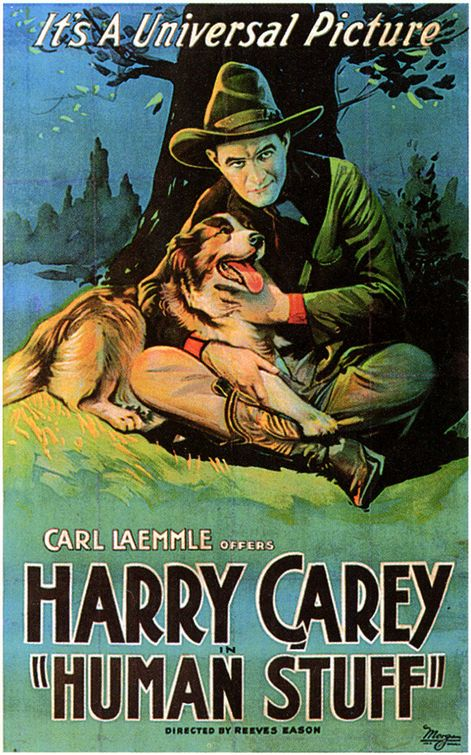
Human Stuff (1920)

Carey was born on January 16, 1878, in the Bronx, New York City. He is the son of Henry DeWitt Carey (a newspaper source gives the actor's name as "Harry DeWitt Carey II"), a prominent lawyer and judge of the New York Supreme Court, and his wife Ella J. (Ludlum). He grew up on City Island, Bronx.

Carey was a cowboy, railway superintendent, author, lawyer, and playwright. He attended Hamilton Military Academy, then studied law at New York University. While at the university, Carey became a member of the Delta Upsilon fraternity.

== Stage ==
When a boating accident led to pneumonia, he wrote a play, Montana, while recuperating, and toured the country performing in it for three years. His play was very successful, but Carey lost it all when his next play was a failure. In 1911, his friend Henry B. Walthall introduced him to director D.W. Griffith, with whom Carey would make many films.

Carey's Broadway credits include But Not Goodbye, Ah, Wilderness, and Heavenly Express.

== Career ==
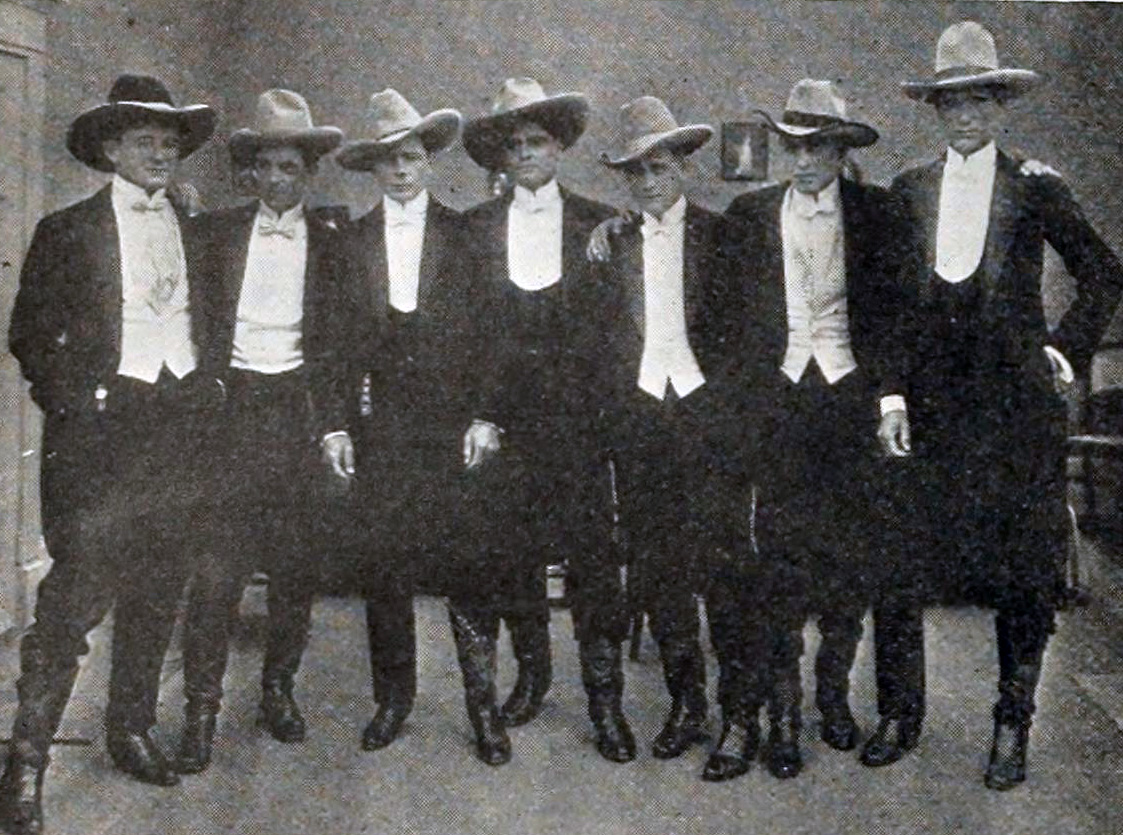
Carey and cowboys (1916)

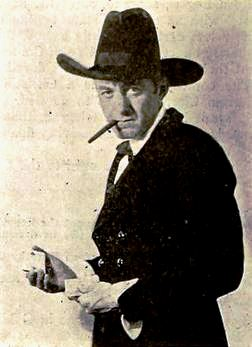
In Bret Harte's The Outcasts of Poker Flat (1919 film) directed by John Ford

Carey first appeared in a film in 1908. He was contracted to make four films—not only acting, but also doing his own stunt work. He is best remembered as one of the first stars of the Western film genre.

In 1909, Carey began working for the Biograph Company. In 1911, he was signed by D.W. Griffith. His first film for Griffith was The Sorrowful Shore, a sea story.

One of his most popular roles was as the good-hearted outlaw Cheyenne Harry. The Cheyenne Harry franchise spanned two decades, from A Knight of the Range (1916) to Aces Wild (1936). Carey starred in director John Ford's first feature film, Straight Shooting (1917).

Carey's rugged frame and craggy features were well suited to Westerns and outdoor adventures. When sound films arrived, Carey displayed an assured, gritty baritone voice that suited his rough-hewn screen personality. He was the logical choice for the title role in MGM's outdoor jungle epic Trader Horn. By this time, Carey, already in his 50s, was too mature for most leading roles, and the only starring roles that he was offered were in low-budget Westerns and serials. He soon settled into a comfortable career as a solid, memorable character actor; he received an Academy Award nomination for Best Supporting Actor for his role as the President of the Senate in the 1939 film Mr. Smith Goes to Washington. Among his other notable later roles were that of Master Sergeant Robert White, crew chief of the bomber Mary Ann in the 1943 Howard Hawks film Air Force and Mr. Melville, the cattle buyer, in Hawks's Red River. Carey made his Broadway stage debut in 1940, in Heavenly Express with John Garfield.

Carey starred in a variety show produced at Treasure Island, the Navy base in San Francisco Bay, in May 1944. He "thrilled the audience with his cowboy hit tunes" on a show with a "hillbilly theme a la swing"--an odd promotional concept occasioned because the all-Black Navy band backing him up had become one of the most renowned swing bands in the area since arriving at Treasure Island in October 1943.

== Personal life ==
Carey married at least twice and possibly a third time. Census records for 1910 indicate he had a wife named Clara Carey (nee Streat). Some references state that he was also married to an actress named Fern Foster.

His last marriage was in 1920 to actress Olive Fuller Golden, "daughter of George Fuller Golden, one of the greatest of the vaudevillians." Harry and Olive were together until his death in 1947. They purchased a 1,000-acre ranch in Saugus, California, north of Los Angeles, which was later turned into Tesoro Adobe Historic Park in 2005.

The Careys had a son, Harry Carey, Jr., and a daughter, Ella "Cappy" Carey. Harry Jr., nicknamed Dobe, would become a character actor, most famous for his roles in Westerns. Father and son both appear (albeit in different scenes) in the 1948 film Red River, and mother and son are both featured in 1956's The Searchers.

== Death ==
A long-time cigar smoker, Harry Carey died in 1947 at the age of 69 from coronary thrombosis, believed to have been aggravated by a bite from a black widow spider a month earlier. More reliable sources refute the arachnid anecdote listed in contemporary Associated Press reports. Carey's son blamed a combination of emphysema and cancer in his 1994 memoir Company of Heroes: My Life As an Actor in the John Ford Stock Company. In Print the Legend: The Life and Times of John Ford, author Scott Eyman states that lung cancer was the cause of death. He was interred in Woodlawn Cemetery in the family mausoleum in the Bronx, New York.

== Honors and homages ==
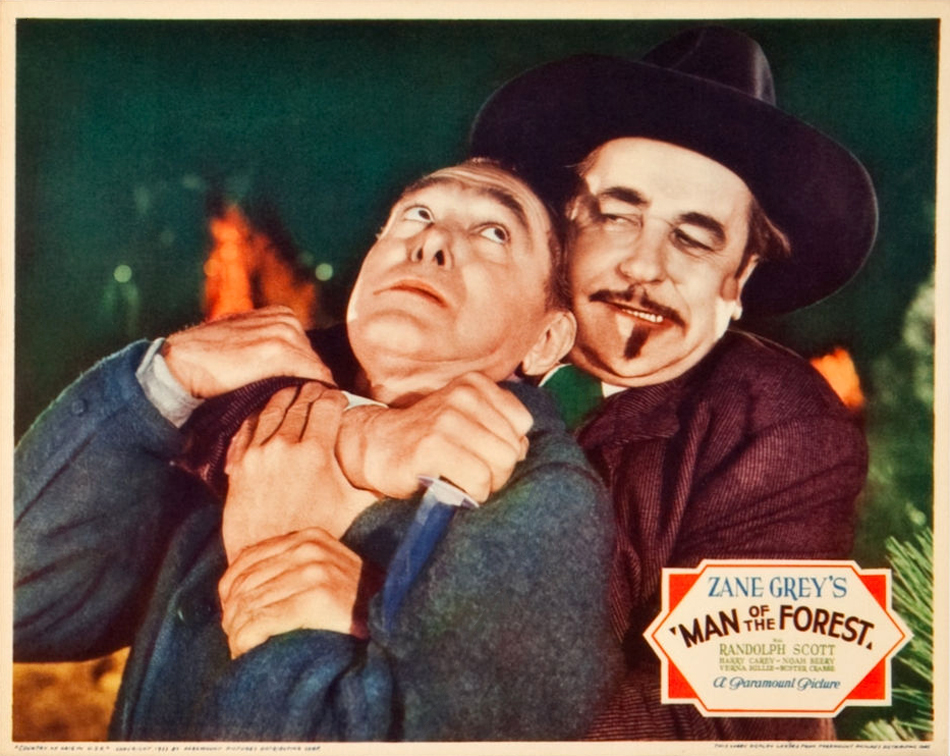
Harry Carey and Noah Beery Sr. in Man of the Forest (1933)

For his contributions to the film industry, Harry Carey has a motion pictures star on the Hollywood Walk of Fame at 1521 Vine Street. The star was dedicated February 8, 1960.

In the 1948 John Ford film, 3 Godfathers, Carey is remembered at the beginning of the film and dubbed "Bright Star of the early western sky..."

As a homage to him, John Wayne held his right elbow with his left hand in the closing shot of The Searchers, imitating a stance Carey himself often used in his films. According to Wayne, both Carey's widow Olive (who costarred in the film) and he wept when the scene was finished.

In 1976, he was inducted into the Western Performers Hall of Fame at the National Cowboy & Western Heritage Museum in Oklahoma City, Oklahoma.

In 1987, his name was emblazoned along the Walk of the Western Stars on Main Street in Old Town Newhall in Santa Clarita, California. (His son, Harry Carey Jr., was also honored in 2005.)

== Radio appearances ==
Year	Program	Episode/source
1943	Lux Radio Theatre	Air Force

== See also ==
- List of actors with Academy Award nominations
