= Jim Lankas =

American football player (1918–1978)

No. 16, 3, 43, 23
- Position: Fullback

Personal information
- Born: August 26, 1918; Stratton, Nebraska, U.S.
- Died: August 9, 1978 (aged 59); Edison, Kansas, U.S.
- Listed height: 6 ft 2 in (1.88 m)
- Listed weight: 220 lb (100 kg)

Career information
- High school: Atwood (Atwood, Kansas); Holy Cross Abbey (Cañon City, Colorado)
- College: Saint Mary's (1938–1940)

Career history
- Paterson Panthers (1941); Jersey City Giants (1941); Newark Bears (1941); Brooklyn Dodgers (1942)*; Philadelphia Eagles / Steagles (1942–1943); Green Bay Packers (1943)
- * Offseason or practice squad member only
- Stats at Pro Football Reference

James Jarrett Lankas (August 26, 1918 – August 9, 1978) was an American professional football player. He was a fullback in college football for the St. Mary's Gaels and later for three seasons professionally. He played for the Paterson Panthers, Jersey City Giants and Newark Bears of the American Association (AA), and for the Philadelphia Eagles and Green Bay Packers of the National Football League (NFL). He was also a member of the Brooklyn Dodgers.

== Early life ==
Lankas was born on August 26, 1918, in Stratton, Nebraska, and was of Czechslovakian and Polish descent. He attended Atwood High School in Kansas and then Holy Cross Abbey in Cañon City, Colorado. He played football as a fullback and was known as "Jarring Jim".

A triple-threat man, Lankas was an all-section selection at Atwood and was among the state's leading scorers in 1936 with 122 points. As a senior at Abbey in 1937, he scored 126 points and his coach said that Lankas "is the best all-around back I had ever coached." He finished his high school football career having appeared in 51 games, scoring 531 points in those games for an average of 10.4 points per game. He recorded over 7,000 scrimmage yards. While in high school, Lankas also competed as a boxer, being considered the top heavyweight in southwestern Nebraska, according to The Stratton News.

== College career ==
After high school, Lankas enrolled at Saint Mary's College of California on a four-year football scholarship in 1938, being regarded as "the greatest prospect ever to enter the school", according to the Times-Standard. He played for St. Mary's freshman football team that year and was considered the fastest member of the team. One newspaper described him as "all muscle and very fast", as well as being "mean, very mean, very mean, when he tackles and blocks." He missed part of the season after suffering a knee injury. He then made the varsity team as a sophomore in 1939, playing as the third-string fullback. He played his last season for St. Mary's in 1940 and played alongside his brother, George, a fullback. He was used as a halfback during the 1940 season.

== Professional career ==
Lankas turned professional in 1941, signing with the Paterson Panthers of the American Association (AA), turning down an offer from the Pittsburgh Steelers of the National Football League (NFL). He appeared in four games, one as a starter, before being released in October 1941; he then joined the Jersey City Giants. After appearing in two games, scoring one extra point, Lankas was released by the Giants, and then signed to the Newark Bears. He played two games for the Bears that same season.

In 1942, Lankas signed with the Brooklyn Dodgers of the NFL. He did not appear in any games for the Dodgers and was traded to the Philadelphia Eagles in November 1942. He appeared in two games as a backup, recording no statistics for the Eagles. He returned to the Eagles, which became the Steagles, in 1943, and was described as their top fullback prospect by The Philadelphia Inquirer. However, he appeared in no games and was purchased by the Green Bay Packers in October 1943. He played three NFL games for the Packers and ran twice for two yards. He also played in their 62–14 exhibition win over the New London Diesels and scored a touchdown and an extra point. He concluded his NFL career having appeared in five games, none as a starter.

After his stint with the Packers, Lankas began wrestling in Wichita, Kansas. According to The Wichita Beacon, he started wrestling there after "a wrestler failed to show up ... and he entered the ring as a sub". He continued wrestling and began competing as a professional boxer in Wichita in 1947. He purchased a farm in Rawlins County, Kansas, in 1948, and retired from wrestling and boxing.

== Later life and death ==
Lankas later served as a boxing referee and promoter. He was a Democratic Party candidate for Rawlins County sheriff in 1948 and later owned a cafe in Trenton, Nebraska. He died on August 9, 1978, in Edison, Kansas, at the age of 59.
