= Colonial Theatre (New York City) =

Former Broadway theatre in Manhattan, New York

Coordinates: 40.770562°N 73.981913°W

The Colonial Theatre in New York City was at Broadway and 62nd Street in what was then the San Juan Hill neighborhood on the Upper West Side, Manhattan. Originally named the Colonial Music Hall, it was built by Frederic Thompson and Elmer "Skip" Dundy. Designed by George Keister, the theater had a seating capacity of 1,293. The theatre opened on 8 February 1905 with a double bill of the one-act musical comedy A Athletic Girl and the British pantomime A Duel in the Snow.

Thompson and Dundy operated the theater for only a few weeks before selling it to Percy G. Williams, who changed the name to Colonial Theatre. It functioned exclusively as a vaudeville house during Williams' stewardship. In 1912, under the management of B.F. Keith, the name was changed to Keith's Colonial Theatre. Five years later the theater was under the management of E.F. Albee, who renamed it the New Colonial Theatre.

During the early 1920s, the New Colonial Theatre was a venue for many African-American musical revues such as Eubie Blake and Noble Sissle's show Chocolate Dandies and James P. Johnson's Runnin' Wild. The latter show premiered at the theater on October 29, 1923, and was instrumental in making an international dance craze of the Charleston.

From 1925 to 1932, the theater was named Hampden's Theatre, and under the management of actor Walter Hampden it presented Shakespearian fare and classic drama. In 1932, as the RKO Colonial Theatre, it became a movie house. After 1951 the theater was owned by NBC who used it to develop color television equipment (the TK-40 color television camera) and studio techniques, and functioned as a television studio until 1971. Rebekah Harkness subsequently purchased the theater, renovated it, and reopened it in 1974 as the Harkness Theatre. After presenting a sporadic schedule of ballet and legitimate theater, it closed in 1977, and the building was razed later that year.
