= John William Merrow =

American architect

John William Merrow (August 15, 1874 – April 11, 1927) was a New York City theater architect.

== Biography ==
John William Merrow, son of Moses H. and Ella R. A. (Proctor) Merrow, was born in New Hampton, New Hampshire. Known throughout his life as "Will," to distinguish him from his at-the-time better-known uncle, John Francis Merrow, he graduated from New Hampton Literary Institute (now known as New Hampton School) in 1892 and from the New Hampton Commercial College in 1893. He graduated from Dartmouth College in 1897 with an A.B. degree and later attended the architectural course at the Massachusetts Institute of Technology.

His first professional association was with the architectural firm of Wheelwright & Haven in Boston, Massachusetts. In 1900, he was the architect of the East Blue Hill Library in East Blue Hill, Maine, designed in the American Craftsman style. In 1990, this structure was added to the National Register of Historic Places. Also in 1900, he redesigned the interior of the New Hampton Community Church on Main Street in New Hampton, New Hampshire.

He was employed by his uncle Frederick Freeman Proctor (popularly known as "F. F. Proctor"), owner of Proctor Theatrical Enterprises in New York City, designing and "supervising the building of numerous theatres in and out of the city, in addition to keeping all of the houses owned by Mr. Proctor up to modern requirements and standards". In 1905, he was the architect of Proctor's Palace Theatre and Proctor's Palace Roof Theatre, on Market Street between Halsey and Washington Streets, in Newark, New Jersey. This was one of the rare "double decker" theatres, an eight-story complex with a large 2,300-seat theatre at ground level and a smaller theatre of about 900 seats occupying the top four floors beneath the roof. This theatre is described more fully in Warren G. Harris's article under Frederick Freeman Proctor.

After 1909, he was the architect of Frederick Freeman Proctor's 1,100-acre (4 km^{2}) country estate, known as "Proctoria," in Central Valley, New York. He remodeled the old farm house, designed cottages for each of Proctor's two daughters, and created several lakes. The estate was purchased during World War II by the United States Military Academy (USMA) at West Point, for use as a recreation center for cadets. In 1973, the USMA transferred the estate's locally famous gatehouse complex (designed by Merrow) and the adjacent land to the Woodbury Historical Society in Highland Mills, New York.

In 1921, he designed the Theta Delta Chi fraternity house in Hanover, New Hampshire on the basis of plans created by Arthur Bradley Barnes.

John William Merrow never married. He was a member of the New York Athletic Club, Dartmouth Club, Technology Club of New York, Theta Delta Chi fraternity, and the Union Lodge of Masons in Bristol, New Hampshire. At the time of his death, he was living in New York City. He is buried in the Merrow family lot in the New Hampton Village Cemetery, New Hampton, New Hampshire.

== Sources ==
- "Nephew of F. F. Proctor Dies," New York Telegraph, New York, April 12, 1927.
- "John William Merrow," New York Times, New York, April 13, 1927, p. 25.
- The Shield: Official Publication of the Theta Delta Chi Fraternity, 1921, p. 12.
