= Edward Paycen Churchill =

Edward Paycen Churchill (27 June 1877, Chicago — 14 December 1920, New York City) was an American theatre impresario, theatre manager, and talent agent. The founder of several theaters in the Mid-West during the early 20th century, Churchill played an instrumental role in the development of the Western Vaudeville Managers' Association (WVMA); serving as the WVMA's general manager. With the backing of financier E. H. Harriman, he owned and operated the Lake Contrary Amusement Park in St. Joseph, Missouri.

== Life and career ==
Born in Chicago, Edward Paycen Churchill was the son of George F. Churchill and Lizzie M. Churchill (née Addy). In his youth he worked as an usher in theaters in Chicago before moving to Kansas City, Missouri where he became the head of the newly developed sheet music department of the George B. Peck Dry Goods Company. He soon after started a side business of his own, working as a talent agent in Kansas City.

Not satisfied with serving as a booking agent for theaters owned by others, Churchill decided to pursue a business operating his own entertainment venues. He built his first theatre, the Lyric Theatre, in St. Joseph, Missouri. He then partnered with the financier E. H. Harriman to build the Lake Contrary Amusement Park in St. Joseph and theaters in Peoria, Illinois, Kalamazoo, Michigan and Grand Rapids, Michigan. He opened offices in Chicago where he worked as a booking agent; not only for his theaters but for other vaudeville venues. He forged several partnerships, which preceded the formation of the Western Vaudeville Managers' Association (WVMA). Eventually, he merged his organization into the WVMA, at which point he became the WVMA's general manager.

Churchill died on 14 December 1920 in New York City. He is the father of actress Marguerite Churchill.
