= Benjamin Franklin Keith =

American vaudeville theater owner (1846–1914)

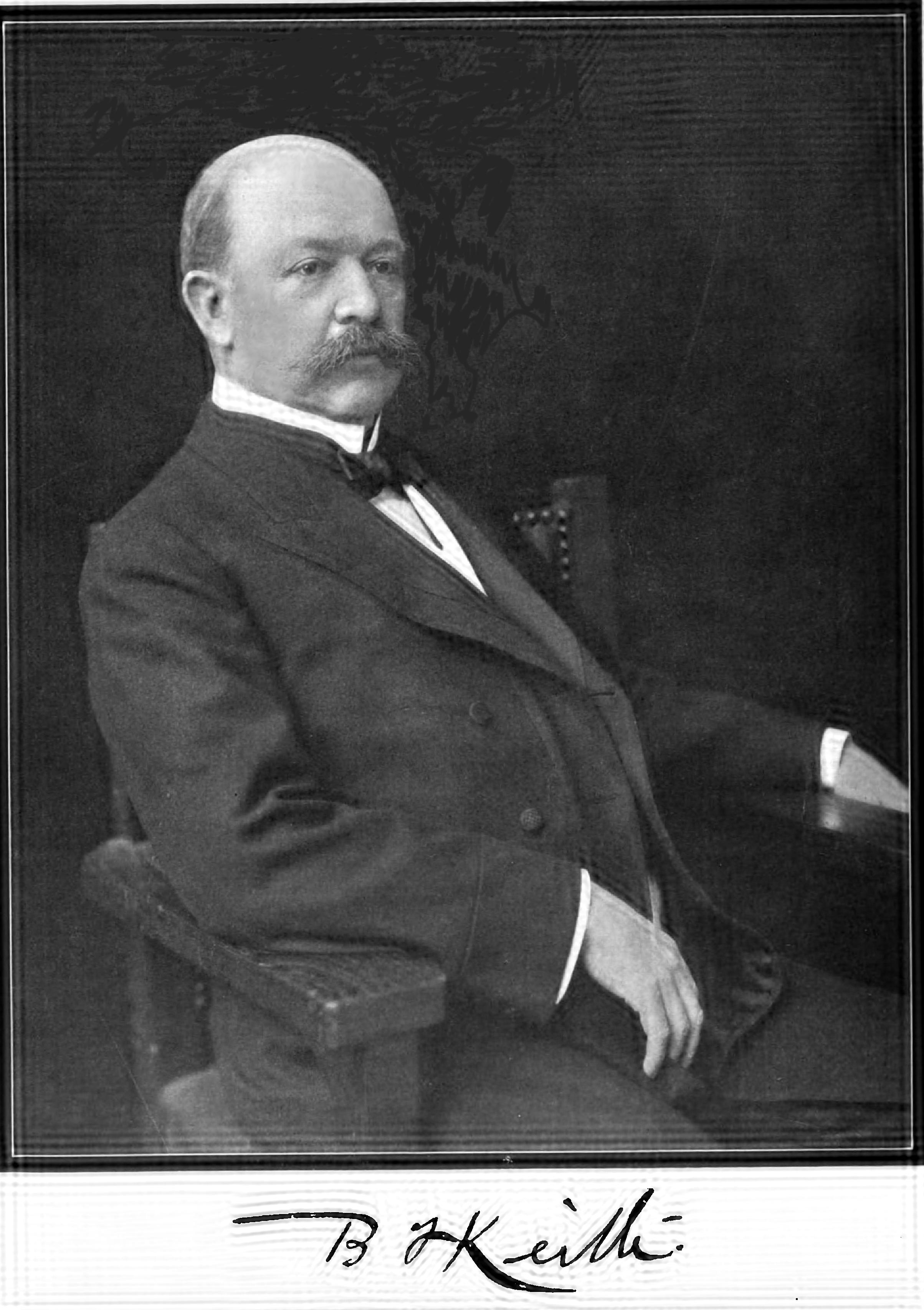
- Keith circa 1909
- Born: January 26, 1846; Hillsborough, New Hampshire
- Died: March 26, 1914 (aged 68); Breakers Hotel; Palm Beach, Florida
- Occupation(s): Vaudevillian theatre owner, film exhibitor
- Spouse(s): Mary Catherine Branley (m. 1873, died 1910); Ethel Bird Chase (m. 1913)
- Children: A. Paul Keith

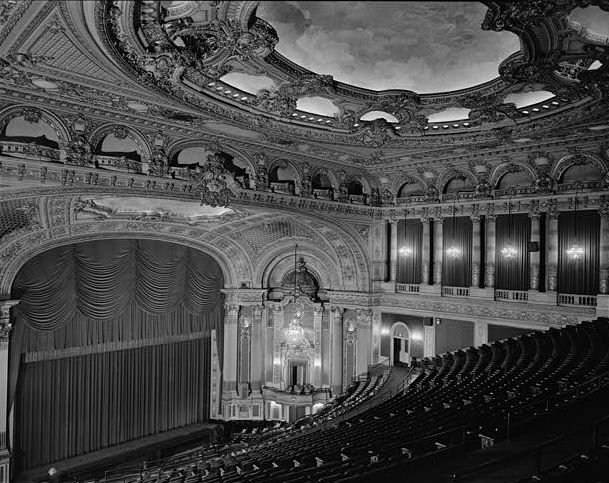
Keith Memorial Theatre, Boston (built 1928)

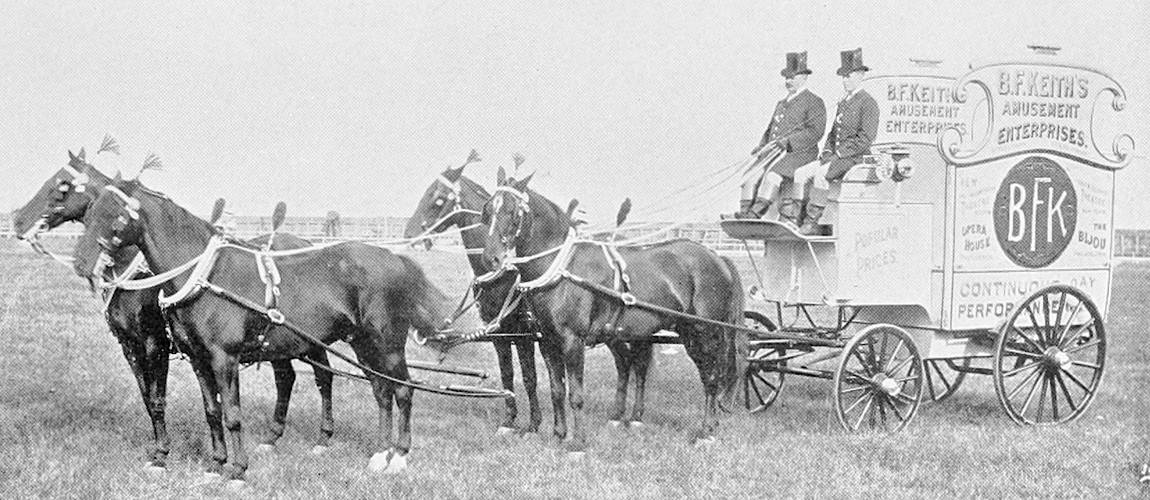
Keith's advertising wagon, ca.1894

Benjamin Franklin Keith (January 26, 1846 – March 26, 1914) was an American vaudeville theater owner, who played an important role in the evolution of variety theater into vaudeville.

== Biography ==
=== Early years ===
Keith was born in Hillsboro Bridge, New Hampshire. He joined the circus (as a "candy butcher") after attending Van Amburgh Circus's and then worked at Bunnell's Museum in New York City in the early 1860s. He later joined P.T. Barnum and then joined the Doris and Forepaugh Circus.

== Gaiety Museum ==
In 1883, Keith and William Austin (later of the Austin and Stone's Dime Museum) opened a curiosity museum in a vacant storefront on Washington Street in Boston. The establishment went by a number of names, including the Hub Museum, New York Museum, Gaiety Hall, and the Gaiety Museum. Its first attraction was an undersized 3 month old child known as "Baby Alice". After two weeks, Austin left the partnership and was replaced by Dan Gardner.

Later that year, Keith expanded the museum to include a 123 seat theater. The theater hosted a variety of events, but vaudeville was the most popular and eventually replaced the museum. The theatre was one of the early adopters of the continuous variety show which ran from 10:00 in the morning until 11:00 at night, every day. Previously, shows ran at fixed intervals with several hours of downtime between shows. With the continuous show, you could enter the theatre at any time, and stay until you reached the point in the show where you arrived.

In 1883, Keith hired E. F. Albee as an assistant. Albee later became Keith's general manager and business partner. In 1884, George G. Batcheller replaced Gardner and the museum was expanded once again.

== Vaudeville ==
In 1886, Keith and Batcheller obtained a lease on Boston's Bijou Theatre. The following year, Keith took sole proprietorship of the theater and began running a continuous show. He quickly expanded his theater business, acquiring the Providence Museum in 1887 (Providence, Rhode Island), Low's Opera House (Providence) in 1888, the Bijou (Philadelphia) in 1888, and Union Square Theatre (New York City) in 1893. In 1894, he opened Keith's Theatre in Boston. In 1900, he purchased the Princess Theatre in London. In 1906, Keith merged his New York and New Jersey theatres with Frederick Freeman Proctor, but dissolved the partnership five years later.

On February 11, 1907, Keith and Proctor formed the United Booking Office of America with New York theater owners Percy G. Williams and Oscar Hammerstein. The two sides maintained ownership of their respective theaters and agreed not to compete with each other. In 1909, Keith, Proctor, Williams, and Hammerstein formed the United Theatres Securities Co. with fellow theater owners Harry Davis of Pittsburgh, Michael Shea of Toronto, P. B. Chase of Washington, D.C., James H. Moore of Rochester, New York, and James C. Duffield and James Dyment of Canada. This gave the United Booking Office control over 100 theaters. In 1911, the United Booking Office reached and agreement with Martin Beck, which gave the United Booking Office control of vaudeville theaters in the east and Beck's Orpheum Circuit control of the west. In 1912, Keith purchased Williams's eight New York City theaters (Bronx, Greenpoint, Gotham, Crescent, Bushwick, Colonial, Orpheum, and Alhambra).

=== Moving pictures ===
Albee and Keith operated the Union Square Theatre in New York City, and it was the site of the first American exhibition of the Lumière Cinématographe. They had obtained the exclusive American rights to the Lumière apparatus and their film output, and the first showing was on June 29, 1896. They then opened theatres in Philadelphia, and Boston, and then smaller theatres in the East and Midwest of the United States, buying out rival smaller chains. They signed a contract with Biograph Studios in 1896 which lasted until July 1905 when they switched to Edison Studios as their supplier of motion pictures.

=== Later life ===
Keith withdrew from business in 1909 and married for a second time on October 29, 1913, to Ethel Bird Chase (1887–1971). She was 26 years old and Keith was 67. Her father was P. B. Chase, owner of Chase's Theater in Washington, D.C.

Keith died at the Breakers Hotel in Palm Beach, Florida in 1914. After his son, A. Paul Keith, died in 1918, control of the company went to Albee.

== Legacy ==
In 1928, the B. F. Keith Circuit merged with the Orpheum Circuit to form the Keith-Albee-Orpheum (KAO) corporation in Marysville, Washington. In a few months, this organization became the major motion picture studio Radio-Keith-Orpheum (RKO). Also in 1928 the B.F. Keith Memorial Theatre opened in Boston. Keith Academy and Keith Hall in Lowell, Massachusetts were named for his family in 1926. His son, A. Paul Keith died without an heir and left the family money to Cardinal William O'Connell.
