= The Harlem Alhambra =

Theater in Harlem, New York, US

Coordinates: 40°48′35″N 73°56′54″W

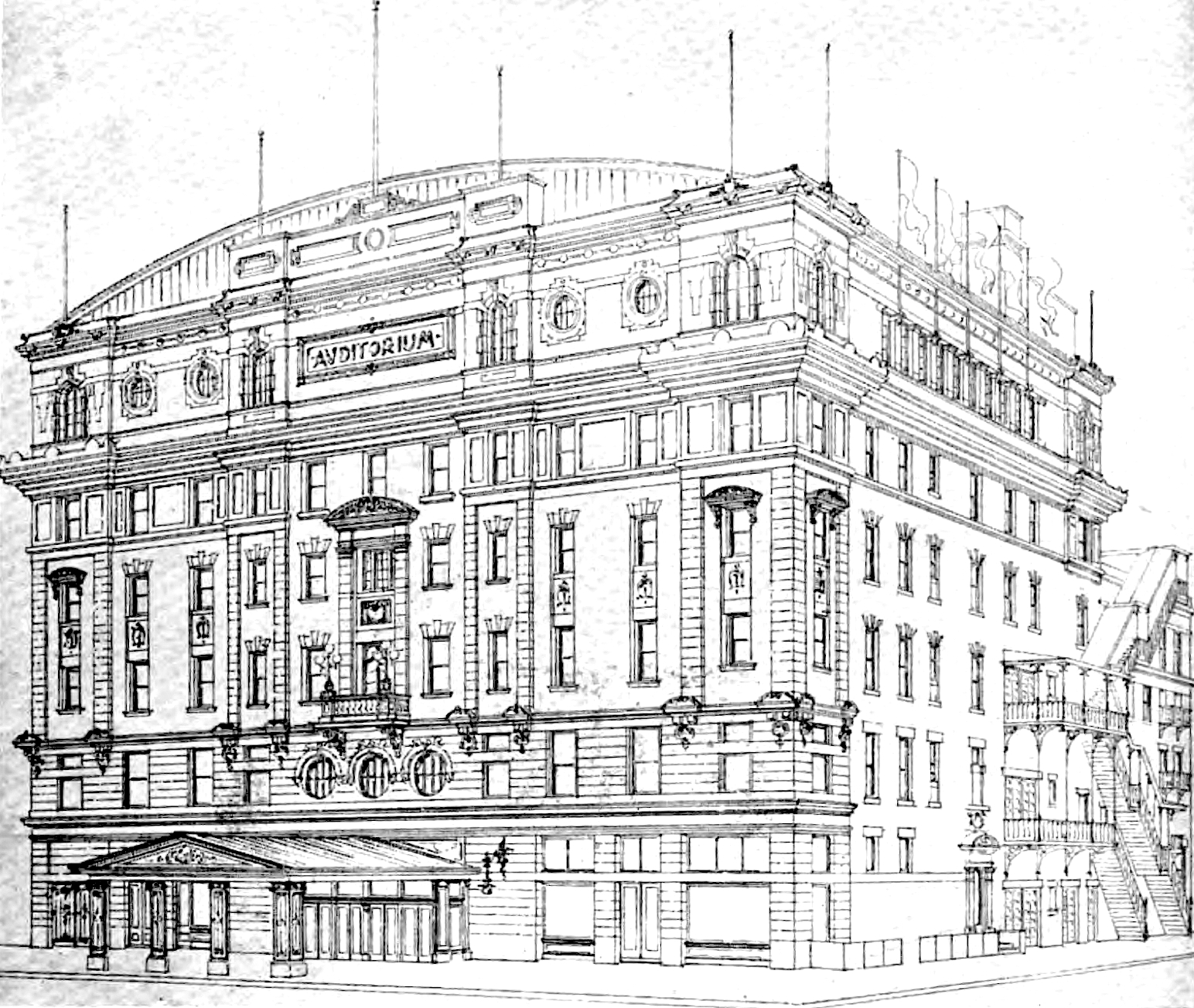
Drawing published in 1904 of the planned Harlem Alhambra, which was then called the Auditorium.

The Harlem Alhambra is a former theater building in Harlem, New York. Built in 1905, it began as a vaudeville venue. The building still stands at 2108-2118 Adam Clayton Powell Jr. Boulevard (7th Avenue) at the South-West corner of 126th Street. The architect was John Bailey McElfatrick (1829–1906) who, based in Manhattan, founded the architectural firm John B. McElfatrick & Son – builder of 100 theaters. Construction on the structure commenced late 1902 by its original owner, Harlem Auditorium Amusement Company.

== Design ==
The original design included specifications for a rathskeller, which was to be a reproduction of the Brunheil Rathskeller in Leipzig, a music hall, a roof garden, and an apartment house. The building is six stories.

== Initial opening ==
The original owners started it in 1903, but it was not completed owing to litigation. At some point during the litigation, the Orpheum Amusement Company, of which Percy G. Williams (1857–1923) was president, acquired the property. When Williams opened the theater on May 15, 1905, the seating capacity was reported to be between 1,435 and 1,650. By 1910, Williams managed the largest number of vaudeville theaters in New York City — two in Manhattan, one in the Bronx, and one each in Brooklyn and Queens. They initially faced challenges in marketing to the changing Harlem population as they did not want to sell to Blacks, for which they were sanctioned.

== Usage ==
=== Jazz era ===
It eventually became a movie venue, including the premiere of Blackbirds, and, in 1929, the theater expanded and opened a ballroom that hosted performers including Bessie Smith and Billie Holiday. Following a rivalry with the Savoy Ballroom and Audubon Ballroom, the ballroom closed during the Great Depression.

=== 21st century ===
The ballroom fell into disrepair in the 1960s, but, after standing empty for the last third of the twentieth century, the Alhambra hosted a 600-person happening and light show by German designer Ingo Maurer on May 22, 2000, called "Harlem Nights: A Night at the Alhambra." This attracted new investment, including a bowling alley, and the top floor reopened in 2003 as The Alhambra Ballroom, Inc., hosting weddings, parties, and other social events. Other tenants have included the King Solomon Grand Lodge of New York, Inc. (Masonic), a supermarket, a French language charter school, and a jazz restaurant – Gospel Uptown (owned by Joseph H. Holland) – on the ground floor (2009-2010), replacing short-lived seafood restaurant, Pier 2110. The Alhambra Ballroom, Inc. filed chapter 7 bankruptcy in the Southern District of New York on August 19, 2020 due to the impact of the COVID-19 pandemic on the events business.
