= Keith's Theatre =

Theatre in Boston, Massachusetts, US

Coordinates: 42°21′14.55″N 71°3′49.13″W

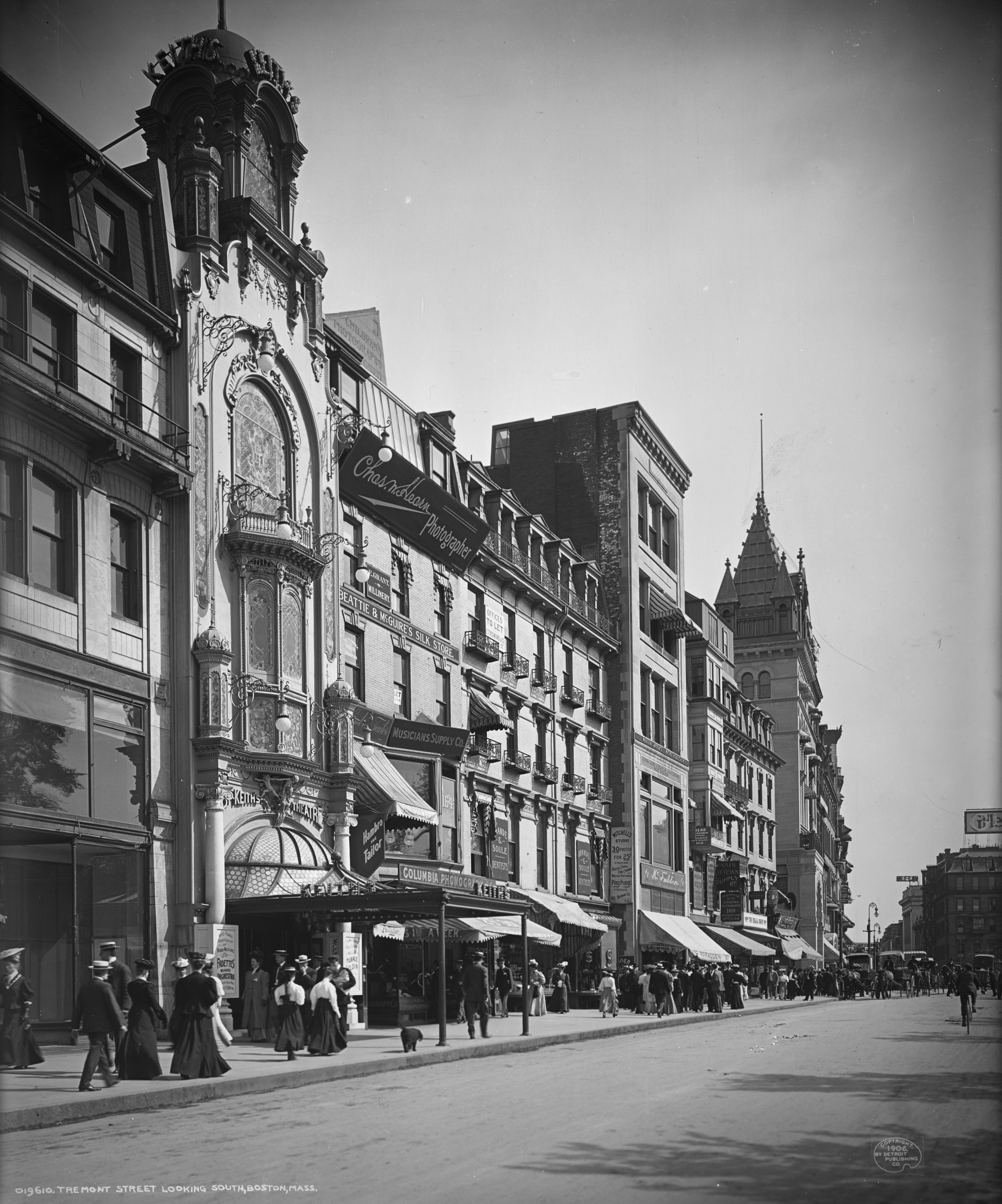
Keith's Theatre, Tremont Street, Boston, c. 1906 (Library of Congress)

B.F. Keith's Theatre (1894–1928) in Boston, Massachusetts, was a vaudeville playhouse run by B.F. Keith. It sat across from Boston Common in the city's theatre district, with an entrance on Tremont Street and another on Washington Street. Personnel included Keith, E.F. Albee and H.E. Gustin. Virgilio Tojetti painted some of the interior decorations. In 1939, the theater was converted to a movie theater named the Normandie.

== Performances/Screenings ==
- Fadettes of Boston
- Edison Vitascope
- Lumière Cinematograph

== Images ==
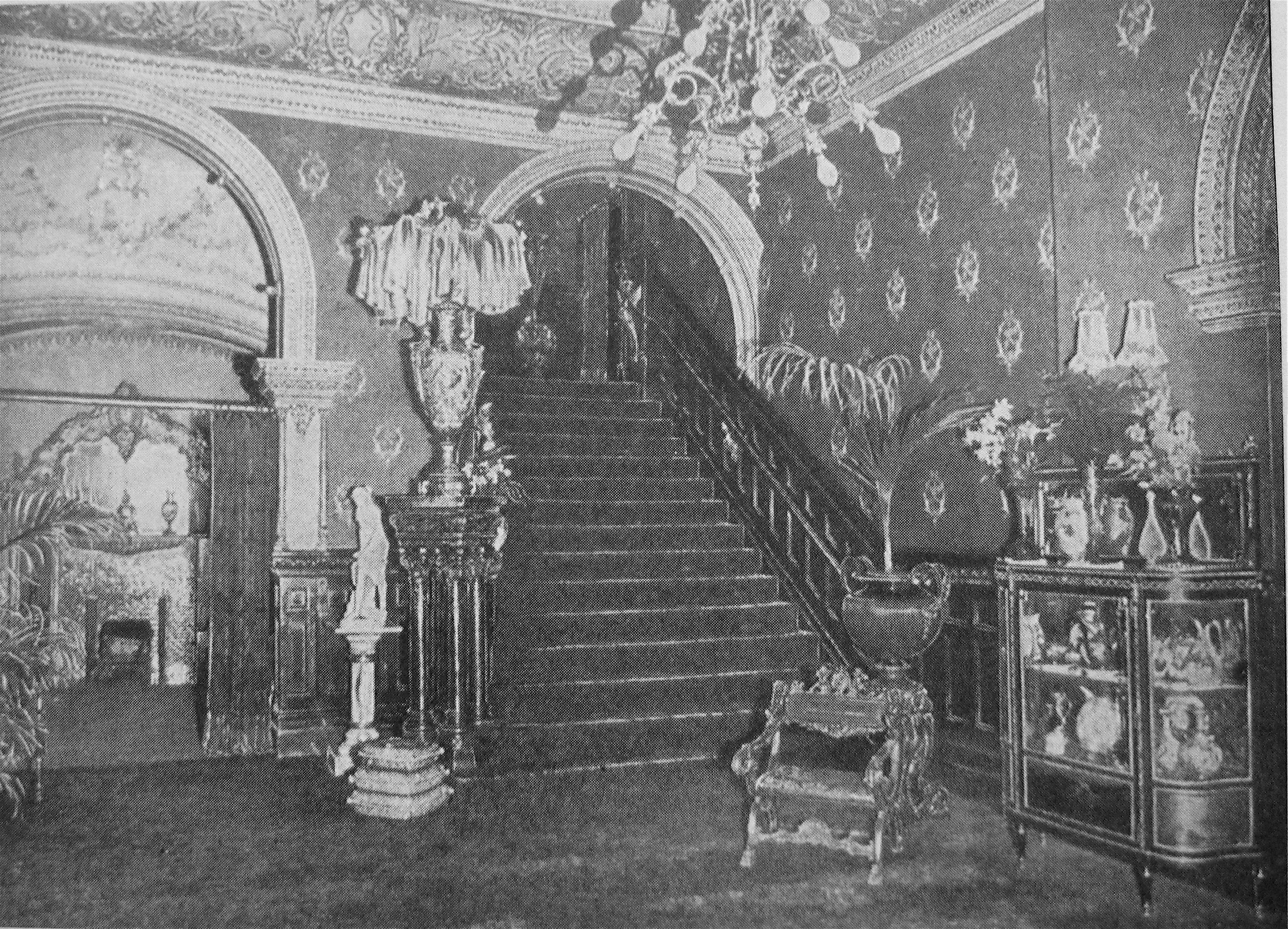
Keith's interior, c. 1894

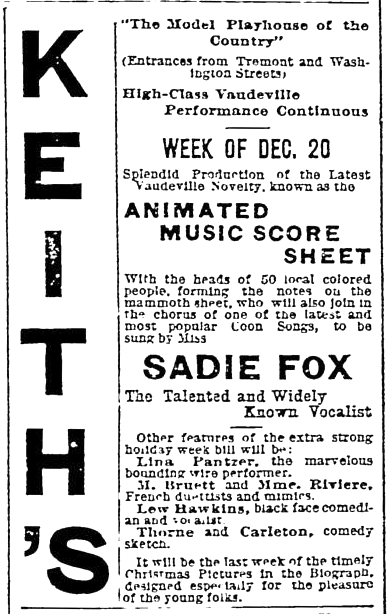
Advertisement, 1897

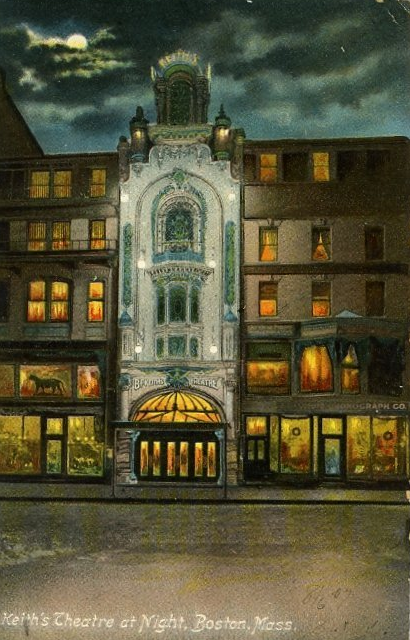
Night view of Keith's, c. 1900s

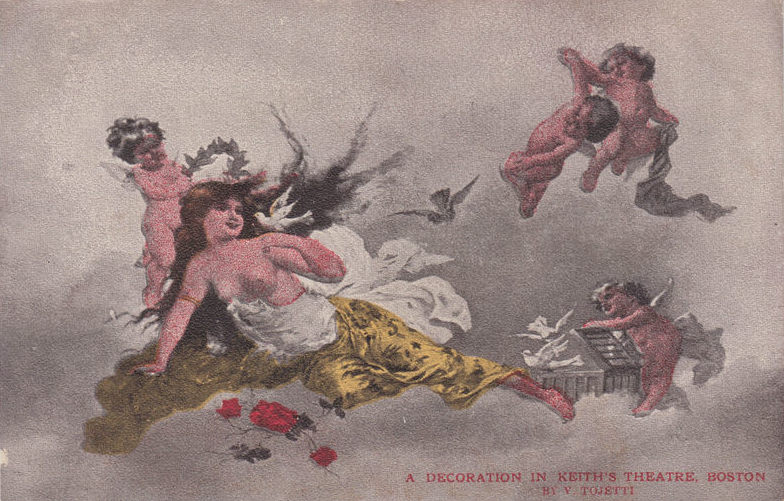
Postcard of decorations by Virgilio Tojetti, c. 1900s

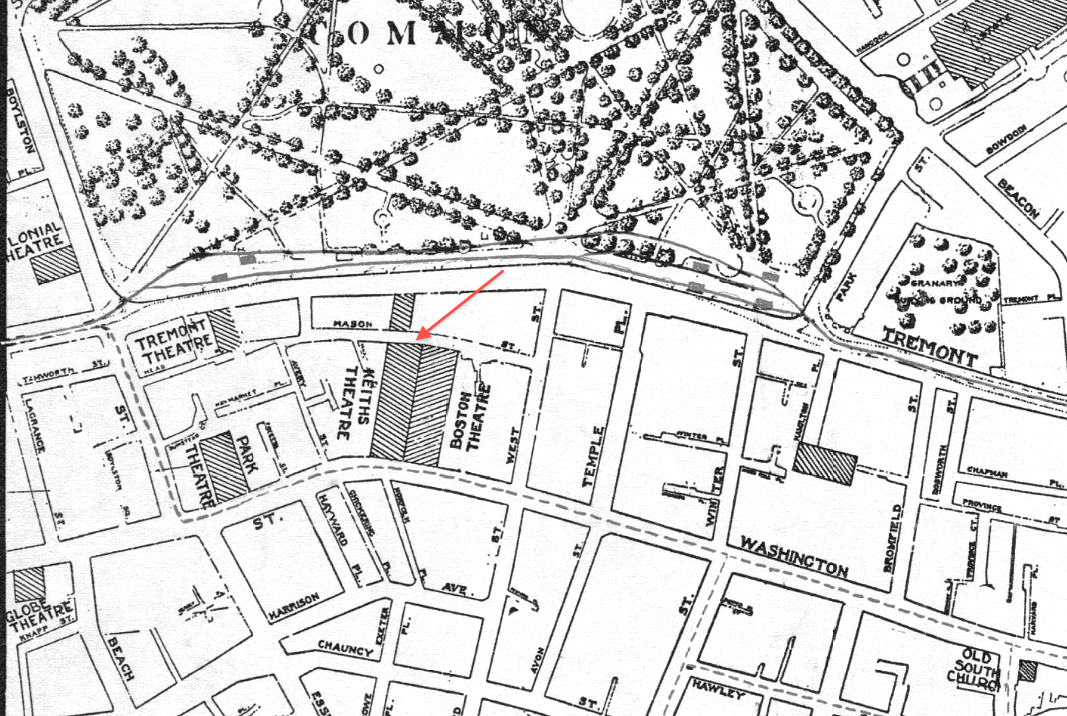
Detail of 1911 map of Boston, showing Keith's

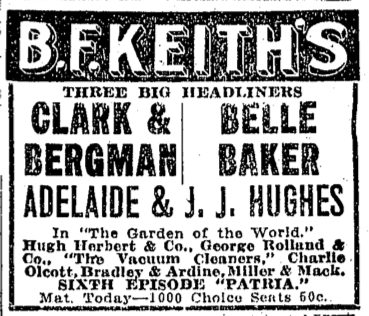
Advertisement for Clark & Bergman; Belle Baker; Adelaide & J.J. Hughes, 1917
