= F. F. Proctor =

American vaudeville impresario

Frederick Freeman Proctor
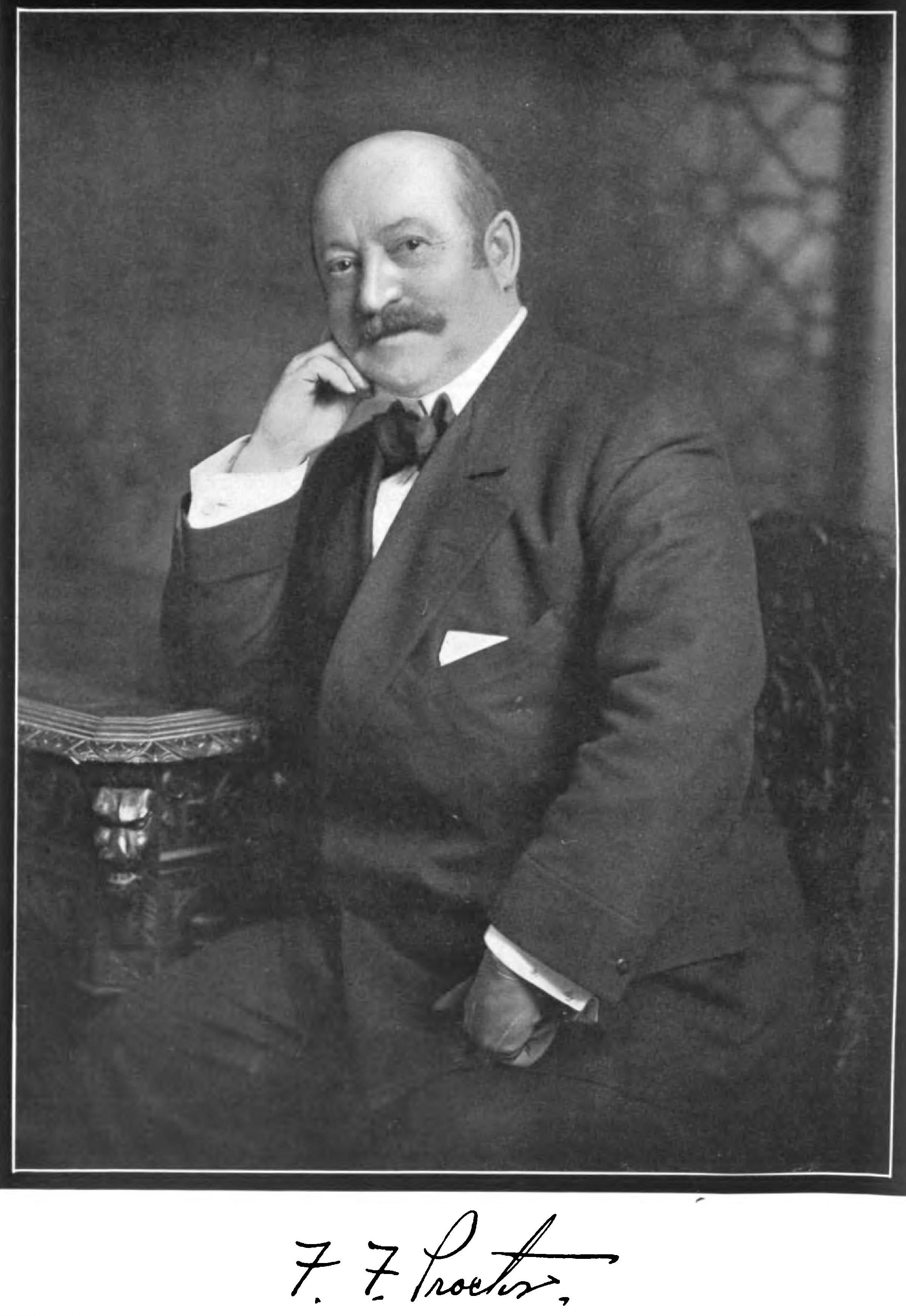
- Proctor circa 1909
- Born: March 17, 1851; Dexter, Maine, US
- Died: September 4, 1929 (aged 78); Larchmont, New York, US
- Known for: Vaudeville
- Relatives: John William Merrow, nephew

Frederick Freeman Proctor (March 17, 1851 – September 4, 1929), aka F. F. Proctor, was a variety theatre impresario known as "The Dean of Vaudeville," pioneered "continuous vaudeville" at his 23rd Street Theater in New York City as well as the introduction of motion pictures into vaudeville theaters.

== Bio ==
Frederick Freeman Proctor was born to Alpheus Proctor and Lucy Ann Tufts in the mill town of Dexter, Maine, where his father was a doctor. As a boy at home and later in Boston, where he worked in a dry goods store, young Proctor practiced tumbling, trapeze and juggling barrels and boxes with his feet. He joined the Tremont Gymnasium, a training facility for professional and would-be professional acrobats, where he was recruited to join another performer who had purchased the established name "The Levantine Brothers" from a retiring team of acrobats.

Variety show producer M.B. Leavitt visited the gym c. 1866 and was impressed by Proctor, but not his partner, so young Fred was paired by the Tremont gym's "professor" with George Mansfield, another acrobat and future theatrical producer. Proctor and Mansfield traveled as "The Levantine Brothers" with the L.B. Lent Circus for more than five years. Mansfield left to tour in Europe, and Proctor did the same in 1872. He continued to perform with various partners and as a solo "equilibrist" in Europe and North America before launching his career in theatrical management.

In 1881, Proctor took over the Novelty Theatre, on Green Street in Albany, NY., running it as "Levantine's Novelty Theatre." In 1883, he made his last appearance as a performer and, in partnership with circus owner William Coup, opened a museum and theatre in Rochester, New York, where the Grau company presented comic operas.

In 1884, Proctor launched a partnership with dime museum operator Henry R. Jacobs, and together with him turned the Martin Opera House in Albany into "Jacobs & Proctor's Museum" (later upgraded to "Jacobs & Proctor's Theatre"). The partnership's empire of bargain-priced (10¢,20¢,30¢) museum/theaters expanded to include a host of venues in Schenectady, Rochester, Utica, Buffalo, Syracuse, Brooklyn, Troy, New Haven, Bridgeport, Hartford, Lancaster, Lynn, Wilmington, Worcester and other cities. After breaking up with Jacobs, Proctor in 1889 opened his most famous theater, Proctor's Twenty-third Street, between Sixth and Seventh Avenues in Manhattan, initially for "legitimate" productions and later, emulating B.F. Keith in Boston, for "continuous vaudeville." He teamed up with Keith in 1906 but the partnership broke up five years later. At his height, Proctor had a chain of fifty theaters. In 1929, he sold his remaining eleven to RKO (Radio-Keith-Orpheum).

In 1872, Proctor married the "serio-comic" singer Mary Ann "Polly" Daly (1853-1901), who performed with him until 1880. The couple had a son, F.F. Freeman, Jr., and three daughters, Ellenor, Henrietta and Emma. In 1904, Proctor married Georgena Eliza Miles (1861-1965). He died on September 4, 1929 of lung cancer.

== Schenectady, New York ==
Proctor opened his first theater in Schenectady, New York in 1912, near the Erie Canal. On April 14, 1925, ground was broken for the "new" Proctor's Theatre in Schenectady, New York at its present site. Designed by famed theater architect Thomas W. Lamb, the theater cost $1.5 million to build and had a seating capacity of 2,700. On December 27, 1926, Proctor's Theatre opened with a showing of Stranded in Paris, a silent film starring Bebe Daniels.

Inside was a $50,000 Wurlitzer organ. Over 7,100 paid admissions were collected. In 1928, sound equipment was installed for the "talkies". On May 22, 1930, Proctor's was the site of an early demonstration of wide-screen television. An orchestra led by the image of a conductor that was sent from the General Electric laboratories over a mile away, and projected onto a seven-foot screen. The experiment was by Ernst Alexanderson.

== RKO ==
In 1929, the chain was sold to the Radio-Keith-Orpheum Corporation (RKO).

== Death ==
Frederick F. Proctor died in 1929 at his home in Larchmont, New York, aged 78 years; death was due to congestion of his lungs.
