= Michael Sheard filmography =

The filmography of Michael Sheard.

== Film ==
Year	Title	Role	Notes	Ref.
1970	The McKenzie Break	Ingenieur-Offizier Unger		
1971	Universal Soldier	Man	Uncredited	
1972	Frenzy	Jim	Uncredited	
1972	The Darwin Adventure	Man #1		
1973	Blue Movie Blackmail (aka Super Bitch)	Williamson	Uncredited	
1973	Hitler: The Last Ten Days	Banker	(Scenes deleted)	
1973	England Made Me	Fromm		
1973	Holiday on the Buses	Depot Manager		
1974	Soft Beds, Hard Battles	New Military Governor	Uncredited	
1975	Erotic Inferno	Eric Gold		
1975	The Hiding Place	Kapteyn		
1978	Force 10 from Navarone	Sgt. Bauer		
1979	Escape to Athena	Sgt. Mann		
1979	The Riddle of the Sands	Böhme		
1980	The Empire Strikes Back	Admiral Ozzel		
1980	Rough Cut	Man at Airport	Uncredited	
1981	Green Ice	Jaap		
1981	Raiders of the Lost Ark	Oskar Schomburg, U-Boat Captain	Uncredited	
1983	High Road to China	Charlie		
1987	Murder Rap	Defense Counsel	Uncredited	
1989	Indiana Jones and the Last Crusade	Adolf Hitler	Uncredited	
1989	Doombeach	Headmaster		
2001	Another Life	Mr. Justice Shearman		
2005	The Green Door	Peeping Tom		
2006	Order of the Sith: Downfall	Narrator	Posthumous release	

== Television ==
Year	Title	Role	Notes
1962	Suspense	Uncredited	Episode: Needle Point
1963	First Night	Finch	Episode: Guilty
1963-77	Dixon of Dock Green	Various	13 episodes
1964	The Indian Tales of Rudyard Kipling	The Blind Mullah	Episode: The Head of the District
1964	Crossroads	Albert Ede	
1965	The Likely Lads	Nesbit	2 episodes
1965	The Mask of Janus	Driver	Episode: The Cold Equation
1965	Theatre 625	Man in white coat	Episode: The World of George Orwell: 1984
1965	Dr. Finlay's Casebook	Jack Farrar	Episode: The Vision
1966	Ransom for a Pretty Girl	Uncredited	Episode: Shaw
1966	Adam Adamant Lives!	Major	Episode: D for Destruction
1966	Vendetta	False Ticket Collector	Episode: The Ice-Cream Man
1966	The Troubleshooters	Second Mechanic	Episode: When You Gotta Go
1966	Softly Softly	Thomas	2 episodes: Barlow Was There
1966-89	Doctor Who	Various	Serials: "The Ark" "The Mind of Evil" "Pyramids of Mars" "The Invisible Enemy" "Castrovalva" "Remembrance of the Daleks!
1967	Sir Arthur Conan Doyle	Driver	Episode: The Brown Hand
1967	Dr. Finlay's Casebook	Porter; Dr. Collins	Episode: Possessed; Episode: Bird Seed and Begonias
1967	The Gamblers	Forbes	Episode: The Wrecker
1967	Ways with Words	Uncredited	
1967	Dixon of Dock Green	Taunton	Episode: The Run
1968	The Wednesday Play	East German interrogator	Episode: Coincidence
1968	A Man of our Times	Male cousin	Episode: Someone I Knew
1968-69	Softly Softly	Sgt. Jefferson/PC Rivers	3 episodes
1968-72	Z-Cars	Various	3 episodes
1969	The Borderers	Alan Hume	Episode: Hero
1969	The First Lady	Uncredited	Episode: The Battle of Waterloo Street
1969	The Troubleshooters	German	Episode: Over The Hill
1969	Albert!	Arthur Pringle	4 episodes
1969	Strange Report	TV Manager	Episode: Report 7931: Sniper - When Is Your Cousin Not?
1969	The Doctors	Det. Con. Zane	2 episodes
1969	ITV Sunday Night Theatre	Doctor Gowan	Episode: Machine
1969	The Expert	PC Muir	2 episodes
1970	Randall and Hopkirk (Deceased)	German Commentator	Episode: Somebody Just Walked Over My Grave
1970	Biography	Spangenberg	Episode: I Measured the Skies
1970	The Adventures of Don Quick	Broul	Episode: People Isn't Everything
1971	Paul Temple	Ken Harrow	Episode: The Guilty Must Die
1971	Jason King	The Electrician	Episode: A Page Before Dying
1971	The Persuaders!	Constable John Walden	Episode: A Home of One's Own
1971-75	Softly Softly: Task Force	Dickenson/Dr. Janes	2 episodes
1972	The Onedin Line	Smethurst	Episode: Blockade
1972	To Encourage the Others	Fairfax	TV movie
1972	The Man Outside	Uncredited	Episode: Doubts Are Traitors
1972	The Adventures of Black Beauty	Jackson	Episode: The Hostage
1972	Colditz	Oberst Reichtleig	Episode: The Undefeated
1972	Madigan	Coroner	Episode: The London Beat
1972-77	Van der Valk	Paul Harkemer/Ruytens	2 episodes
1973	ITV Sunday Night Theatre	Heinrich Himmler	Episode: The Death of Adolf Hitler
1973	The Rivals of Sherlock Holmes	Dr. Jones	Episode: The Mysterious Death on the Underground Railway
1973	Adam Smith	Mr. Buchanan	1 Episode
1973	On the Buses	Manager/1st Judge	6 episodes
1973	Bowler	Doctor Mumbry	Episode: Bowler's Analysis
1973	The Protectors	Inspector Luhrs	Episode: Wam: Part 2
1973			3 episodes: The Thunderbolts
1973-78	Crown Court	Sergeant Goss/Dr. Arnold Anderson	2 episodes
1974	ITV Playhouse	Prison officer	Episode: Lucky
1974	Special Branch	Adrian Penfold	Episode: Catherine the Great
1974	Fall of Eagles	Losehek	Episode: Requiem for a Crown Prince
1974	Dial M for Murder	Police Doctor	Episode: Both Hands Free
1974	Look and Read	Number Two	Episode: Cloud Burst: Part 1 - Out of Control
1974	Microbes and Men	Loeffler	Episode: Men of Little Faith
1974	The Dick Emery Show	Himself	1 Episode
1974	Father Brown	Philip Aylmer	Episode: The Dagger with Wings
1974	Not On Your Nellie	Detective Inspector	Episode: Something in the Night
1975	Churchill's People	Archbishop	Episode: A Wilderness of Roses
1975	The Main Chance	Analyst	Episode: Process
1975	Armchair Cinema	Mr. Turnish	Episode: In Sickness and in Health
1975	Not On Your Nellie	P.C. Breamwater	Episode: Called to the Bar
1975	The Sweeney	Mr. Penketh	Episode: Hit and Run
1975	Oil Strike North	John McAllister	Episode: It Depends Where You Stand
1975	Lord Peter Wimsey	Inspector MacPherson	3 episodes
1975	Shades of Greene	Inspector Tweedie	Episode: A Little Place Off the Edgware Road
1975	Space: 1999	Dr. Darwin King	Episode: Dragon's Domain
1975	Within These Walls	Chaplain	Episode: Get the Glory Down
1976	Warship	R-Admiral Chandy	Episode: The Buccaneer
1976	Second Verdict	Dr. Bunger	Episode: Who Burned the Reichstag?
1976	The Brothers	Harvey McKay; Customs Officer	Episode: Windmills; Episode: Red Sky in the Morning
1976	The Expert	Mr. Justice Caldwell	Episode: Hour of the Snake
1976	Beasts	Sergeant	Episode: The Dummy
1976	The New Avengers	Peters	Episode: Faces
1976	The Cedar Tree	Dr. Edelmann	2 episodes: The Treatment
1976	The Dancing Years	Capt. Goetzer	TV movie
1976	Rogue Male	Adolf Hitler	TV movie
1976-80	BBC2 Playhouse	Police inspector/Preston	2 episodes
1977	Romance	Sommelier	Episode: Three Weeks
1977	The Foundation	Bobby Anderson	2 episodes
1978	Mind Your Language	Police Sergeant	Episode: The Best Things in Life
1978	The Professionals	Merton	Episode: When the Heat Cools Off
1978	Hazell	Det. Con. Finch	Episode: Hazell and the Weekend Man
1978	All Creatures Great and Small	Adderley	Episode: Sleeping Partners
1978	Law & Order	Insurance Assessor	Episode: A Detective's Tale
1978	The Many Wives of Patrick	Mr. Mountshaft	Episode: One Decree Under
1978	Scottish Playbill	James Dinsdale	Episode: If the Face Fits
1978	The Tomorrow People	Hitler	Serial: "Hitler's Last Secret"
1978	The Famous Five	Police Inspector	Episode: Five Go to Mystery Moor
1978	Lillie	Colonel Hertzl	Episode: Let Them Say
1978	Les Misérables	Commissary	TV movie
1978	Plain Murder	Harrison	TV movie
1979	Danger UXB	Police Superintendent	Episode: Butterfly Winter
1979	Lovely Couple	Henry Penrose	Episode: Cuckoo in the Nest
1979	All Quiet on the Western Front	Paul's Father	TV movie
1979	Minder	Elliot	Episode: A Tethered Goat
1979	Grandad	Harold Thorntree	Episode #1.2
1979-80	Play for Today	Prison Officer/Conrad Tucker	2 episodes
1980	Sherlock Holmes and Doctor Watson	Butler	Episode: The Case of the Other Ghost
1980	Blake's 7	Klegg	Episode: Powerplay
1980	An Enemy of the People	Provost	TV movie
1980	Enemy at the Door	Oberstleutnant Koerner	Episode: The Raid
1980	Jukes of Piccadilly	Donaldson	2 episodes: The Corcelli Medallion
1980	High Road	Nikki Zaharoff	Unknown episodes
1980	Armchair Thriller	Colonel Morgan	2 episodes: Fear of God
1980	Tales of the Unexpected	Inspector	Episode: The Umbrella Man
1980	Square Mile of Murder	Dr. Patterson	Episode: The Human Crocodile
1980	Buccaneer	John Lancaster	2 episodes
1980	The Sandbaggers	Dr. Crabbe	Episode: Sometimes We Play Dirty Too
1981	The Bunker	Heinrich Himmler	TV movie
1981	The Walls of Jericho	Prof. David Masson	Episode: Order of Battle
1981	Cannon and Ball	Sleeping Psychiatrist	Episode #3.5
1981	Take a Letter, Mr. Jones	Mr. Bailey	Episode: The Interview
1981-1982	Maggie	Andrew McKinley	17 episodes
1982	Airline	B.O.T. Official	Episode: Captain Clarke Plus One
1983	Lady Is a Tramp	Man at Bus Stop	Episode #1.5
1983	The Captain's Doll	Colonel	TV movie
1983	Storyboard	Dorian	Episode: The Traitor
1983	The Dark Side of the Sun	Colonel Von Reitz	Episode: Into the Shadows
1983	The Outsider	Reuben Flaxman	5 episodes
1983-1984	Auf Wiedersehen, Pet	Herr Grunwald	5 episodes
1984	Grandad	Mr. Morton	Episode #4.5
1984	Killer Exposed	Det Sup Harrison	TV movie
1984	One by One	Tomkins	Episode: Doctor's Orders
1984	Murder Not Proven?	Solicitor-General	Episode: Open Season
1984	Shine on Harvey Moon	Herr Uwe Braun	Episode: Sisters and Brothers
1984	The Invisible Man	Reverend Edward Bunting	3 episodes
1984	Cold Warrior	Professor Berner	Episode: The Man from Damascus
1985	The Dirty Dozen: Next Mission	Adolf Hitler	TV movie
1985	Space	Himmler	Episode: Part I
1985	Bulman	Joe Wright	Episode: Pandora's Many Boxes
1985	Happy Families	Judge	Episode: Edith
1985-1989	Grange Hill	Mr. Bronson	92 episodes
1987	Knights of God	Medical Officer	2 episodes
1988	Hannay	Perrin	Episode: The Hazard of the Die
1989	Coronation Street	Arthur Dabner	7 episodes
1989	A Touch of Spice	Gordon Pugh	Episode #1.4
1989	Saracen	Dr. Alex Hamilton	Episode: Girls' Talk
1991	The Darling Buds of May	Building Society Manager	Episode: When the Green Woods Laugh: Part 1
1992	Press Gang	Dr. Clipstone	Episode: UnXpected
1992	'Allo 'Allo!	Goering's Double	Episode: Hitler's Last Heil
1993	Alleyn Mysteries	Juniper	Episode: Final Curtain
1994	Takin' Over the Asylum	Mr. Wyatt	Episode: Hey Jude
2003	Hitler of the Andes	Adolf Hitler	TV movie

== Videos ==
Year	Title	Role	Notes
2006	Shadows in the Woods	Michael Benson	Final role; posthumous release
