= Galloping Galaxies! =

- Kenneth Williams and SID
- Genre: Children's, science fiction, comedy
- Created by: Bob Block
- Written by: Bob Block
- Directed by: Jeremy Swan
- Starring: Kenneth Williams; Robert Swales; Priscilla Morgan; Paul Wilce; Nigel Cooke; Sean Caffrey; Michael Deeks; Matthew Sim; James Bree; Julie Dawn Cole; Josie Kidd
- Theme music composer: Jonathan Cohen
- Country of origin: United Kingdom
- Original language: English
- No. of seasons: 2
- No. of episodes: 10

Production
- Producer: Jeremy Swan
- Editor: Peter Bird (credited as videotape editor)
- Camera setup: Colin Reid (credited as camera supervisor)
- Running time: 25 minutes

Original release
- Network: BBC
- Release: 1 October 1985 – 18 December 1986

Galloping Galaxies! is a British children's television comedy series set on a spaceship that was shown on the BBC from 1 October 1985 to 18 December 1986, comprising two series, of ten episodes in total. It was created and written by Bob Block, the creator of Rentaghost. Jeremy Swan who directed Rentaghost, produced and directed the series. It featured Kenneth Williams in one of his final roles as the voice of the ship's bug-eyed computer, SID. A novelisation of the first series was released by Target Books in 1987, and the second series was announced to follow in book form, but never materialised. No commercial release of the show has ever appeared.

== Synopsis ==
The stories are set in the 25th century, and follow the adventures of the Spaceship Voyager, the computer SID, Captain Pettifer (Robert Swales) and his crew.

Cover blurb of novel: "GALLOPING GALAXIES! is the funniest thing this side of the moons of Saturn and will boldly make you laugh where you have never laughed before!"
