= Grandad (TV series) =

British children's television sitcom series

- Genre: Sitcom; Children's television series
- Created by: Bob Block
- Written by: Bob Block
- Directed by: Peter Charlton
- Starring: Clive Dunn; James Marcus; Caroline Dowdeswell; Kirsty Lindsay; Marika Rivera; Michael Sheard
- Theme music composer: Clive Dunn
- Country of origin: United Kingdom
- Original language: English
- No. of series: 5
- No. of episodes: 31

Production
- Producer: Peter Charlton
- Running time: 25 minutes
- Production company: BBC

Original release
- Network: BBC One
- Release: 12 November 1979 – 24 December 1984

Related
- Rentaghost

Grandad is a British television children's sitcom, broadcast by the BBC between 1979 and 1984. The series was created and written by Bob Block.

== Plot ==
The series starred Clive Dunn in the title role as Charlie Quick, a lovable, eccentric grandfather and bumbling community hall caretaker living with his family. Known for his trademark white hair and whiskers (reminiscent of his famous role in Dad's Army), Grandad frequently finds himself caught up in imaginative schemes, comical mishaps, and whimsical adventures alongside his grandchildren, local neighbours, and acquaintances.

== Cast ==
- Clive Dunn as Charlie Quick / Grandad
- James Marcus as Bert Bamford^{[10]}
- Caroline Dowdeswell as Susan
- Kirsty Lindsay as Jane
- Marika Rivera as Mother
- Michael Sheard as Mr. Morton / Thorn-Tree (Guest star across the 1979–1984 run)
- Derek Deadman as Various characters / Neighbour

== Episodes ==
=== Series overview ===
series
| Series | Episodes | Originally released | |
| Series | Episodes | First released | Last released |
|---|---|---|---|
| 1 | 6 | 12 November 1979 | 17 December 1979 |
| 2 | 6 | 3 November 1980 | 8 December 1980 |
| 3 | 6 | 2 November 1981 | 7 December 1981 |
| 4 | 6 | 1 November 1982 | 6 December 1982 |
| 5 | 7 | 5 November 1984 | 24 December 1984 |

=== Series 1 (1979) ===
| No. | Title | Directed by | Written by | Original release date | UK viewers (millions) |
|---|---|---|---|---|---|
| 1 | "The New Arrival" | Peter Charlton | Bob Block | 12 November 1979 | N/A |
Grandad tries to make himself useful around the house, leading to an immediate chain of domestic disasters.
| 2 | "Grandad's Magic" | Peter Charlton | Bob Block | 19 November 1979 | N/A |
Convinced he has hidden magical talents, Grandad attempts to entertain the grandchildren with unpredictable results.
| 3 | "Out of Action" | Peter Charlton | Bob Block | 26 November 1979 | N/A |
When Grandad is told to rest, he finds it impossible to sit still while everyone else is busy.
| 4 | "The Great Escape" | Peter Charlton | Bob Block | 3 December 1979 | N/A |
An afternoon trip to the local park turns into an adventurous expedition when Grandad loses track of time.
| 5 | "Trouble with Pets" | Peter Charlton | Bob Block | 10 December 1979 | N/A |
Grandad decides to help look after a stray animal, much to the initial alarm of the rest of the household.
| 6 | "Christmas Spirit" | Peter Charlton | Bob Block | 17 December 1979 | N/A |
Festive preparations are thrown into delightful chaos as Grandad takes charge of the holiday decorations.

=== Series 2 (1980) ===
| No. | Title | Directed by | Written by | Original release date | UK viewers (millions) |
|---|---|---|---|---|---|
| 1 | "Grandad's Enterprise" | Peter Charlton | Bob Block | 3 November 1980 | N/A |
Grandad attempts a new money-making scheme that quickly involves the whole neighbourhood.
| 2 | "A Sticky Situation" | Peter Charlton | Bob Block | 10 November 1980 | N/A |
DIY projects around the house turn into a sticky mess when Grandad takes matters into his own hands.
| 3 | "The Big Race" | Peter Charlton | Bob Block | 17 November 1980 | N/A |
Grandad enters a local competition, determined to prove he is as fit as anyone half his age.
| 4 | "Grandad's Rascals" | Peter Charlton | Bob Block | 24 November 1980 | N/A |
Babysitting duties descend into absolute mayhem when Grandad joins in with the children's games.
| 5 | "The Raging Bull" | Peter Charlton | Bob Block | 1 December 1980 | N/A |
A quiet day out in the countryside takes an unexpected turn when Grandad encounters local livestock.
| 6 | "Happy Returns" | Peter Charlton | Bob Block | 8 December 1980 | N/A |
Birthday celebrations for Grandad lead to a series of surprise visits and chaotic mix-ups.

=== Series 3 (1981) ===
| No. | Title | Directed by | Written by | Original release date | UK viewers (millions) |
|---|---|---|---|---|---|
| 1 | "Grandad on Tour" | Peter Charlton | Bob Block | 2 November 1981 | N/A |
Grandad takes the family on a day trip that encounters every possible travel mishap.
| 2 | "The Handyman" | Peter Charlton | Bob Block | 9 November 1981 | N/A |
Offering his services as a professional odd-job man, Grandad wreaks havoc across the neighbourhood.
| 3 | "A Star is Born" | Peter Charlton | Bob Block | 16 November 1981 | N/A |
Grandad joins the local amateur dramatics society with memorable and disastrous theatrical results.
| 4 | "The Treasure Hunt" | Peter Charlton | Bob Block | 23 November 1981 | N/A |
Convinced there is hidden treasure buried locally, Grandad organises a frantic community excavation.
| 5 | "Keeping Fit" | Peter Charlton | Bob Block | 30 November 1981 | N/A |
Inspired by morning exercise broadcasts, Grandad tries to whip the entire household into shape.
| 6 | "Going Solo" | Peter Charlton | Bob Block | 7 December 1981 | N/A |
Left to his own devices for the weekend, Grandad manages to turn a peaceful home into a circus.

=== Series 4 (1982) ===
| No. | Title | Directed by | Written by | Original release date | UK viewers (millions) |
|---|---|---|---|---|---|
| 1 | "Back to Nature" | Peter Charlton | Bob Block | 1 November 1982 | N/A |
Grandad attempts to grow his own vegetables in the back garden with chaotic pest-control results.
| 2 | "High Society" | Peter Charlton | Bob Block | 8 November 1982 | N/A |
An invitation to a posh garden party tests Grandad's patience with etiquette and high-class manners.
| 3 | "The Inventive Spirit" | Peter Charlton | Bob Block | 15 November 1982 | N/A |
Grandad invents a labor-saving gadget that creates more work for everyone else in the house.
| 4 | "On the Move" | Peter Charlton | Bob Block | 22 November 1982 | N/A |
Transport troubles multiply when Grandad tries to help fix the neighbourhood vehicles.
| 5 | "A Royal Occasion" | Peter Charlton | Bob Block | 29 November 1982 | N/A |
Preparations for a local royal visit go hilariously off-script under Grandad's supervision.
| 6 | "Pastures New" | Peter Charlton | Bob Block | 6 December 1982 | N/A |
Grandad contemplates a move to the countryside, sending his family into a panic.

=== Series 5 (1984) ===
| No. | Title | Directed by | Written by | Original release date | UK viewers (millions) |
|---|---|---|---|---|---|
| 1 | "Return of the Quick" | Peter Charlton | Bob Block | 5 November 1984 | N/A |
Grandad returns from a brief hiatus with even more ambitious and disruptive plans for the household.
| 2 | "The Artful Dodger" | Peter Charlton | Bob Block | 12 November 1984 | N/A |
Grandad takes up painting and decorating with disastrous splashes of creativity across the property.
| 3 | "Wheels and Deals" | Peter Charlton | Bob Block | 19 November 1984 | N/A |
A second-hand bicycle deal leads Grandad on a breakneck tour of the local streets.
| 4 | "Troubled Waters" | Peter Charlton | Bob Block | 26 November 1984 | N/A |
A weekend fishing trip turns into a comedic aquatic rescue mission for Grandad and Bert Bamford.
| 5 | "The Grand Finale" | Peter Charlton | Bob Block | 3 December 1984 | N/A |
Grandad organizes a grand community variety show starring all his friends and family.
| 6 | "Festive Frolics" | Peter Charlton | Bob Block | 17 December 1984 | N/A |
Christmas preparations reach a boiling point as Grandad takes charge of the holiday festivities.
| 7 | "Final Curtain" | Peter Charlton | Bob Block | 24 December 1984 | N/A |
In the final episode of the series, Grandad bids a fond and comical farewell to his neighbours and family in a memorable Christmas Eve special.

== Home media ==
Selected episodes of Grandad have seen releases via archive television distributors and BBC physical media compilations.
