= List of Rentaghost episodes =

The following is a list of episodes of the British children's comedy Rentaghost, which aired on BBC1 from 6 January 1976 to 6 November 1984. Selected episodes were last shown on the BBC from October 2003 until January 2004, as part of Dick & Dom in da Bungalow on CBBC.

== Series overview ==
Series	Episodes	Originally released	
Series	Episodes	First released	Last released
1	5	6 January 1976	3 February 1976
2	6	18 May 1976	22 June 1976
3	6	22 February 1977	29 March 1977
4	6	14 September 1978	19 October 1978
Christmas Special		19 December 1979	
5	5	7 March 1980	21 March 1980
6	6	24 April 1981	29 May 1981
7	13	5 October 1982	29 December 1982
8	5	18 October 1983	15 November 1983
9	5	9 October 1984	6 November 1984

== Episodes ==
=== Series 1 (January 1976) ===
No. overall	No. in series	Title	Directed by	Written by	Original release date
1	1	"Episode 1"	Unknown	Bob Block	6 January 1976
Recently-deceased Fred Mumford needs to find money to fund his new ghost rental business. He hopes his parents will help him. However, they haven't yet been told their son is dead.
2	2	"Series 1 Episode 2"	Unknown	Bob Block	13 January 1976
Mumford and his fellow ghosts set out to exorcise a ghost which has been terrorising London's Heathrow Airport.
3	3	"Series 1 Episode 3"	Unknown	Bob Block	20 January 1976
Mumford and his colleagues decide to tell their landlord, Mr Meaker, that they are really ghosts. The shock of this lands Mr Meaker in the local hospital, where the Rentaghost team offer to provide a conjuring act for the centenary celebrations. As ghosts they find it easy to vanish—but Mumford has some difficulty in becoming visible again!
4	4	"Series 1 Episode 4"	Unknown	Bob Block	27 January 1976
The Rentaghost team are engaged by a security firm to patrol a large department store and stop shoplifting. However, Claypole is going through a mischievous phase when his poltergeist powers are at their strongest....
5	5	"Series 1 Episode 5"	Unknown	Bob Block	3 February 1976
Haunting a stately home proves to be something of a trial of strength for Mumford. His ghostly Uncle Arthur provides him with an assorted bunch of spooks to help the haunting, then calls them out on strike. Mumford is determined to overcome all the obstacles, even though it might mean temporarily losing his head!

=== Series 2 (May 1976) ===
No. overall	No. in series	Title	Directed by	Written by	Original release date
6	1	"Series 2 Episode 1"	David Crichton	Bob Block	18 May 1976
The trio return in a new series to a new office and a new commercial venture as private detectives. But Mr Mumford 's idea of putting a tail on the suspect is very different from Mr Claypole's!
7	2	"Series 2 Episode 2"	David Crichton	Bob Block	25 May 1976
Rentaghost Transport is the brain-wave of Mr Mumford—but when the ghosts' efforts with fare-paying passengers goes wrong, Mr Mumford decides to concentrate on a furniture removal service. The results are hair-raising!
8	3	"Series 2 Episode 3"	David Crichton	Bob Block	1 June 1976
Mr Mumford, Mr Claypole and Mr Davenport have no money to pay the rent. However, instead of an eviction order, Mr Meaker, their landlord, has a brilliant idea—the ghosts can present a concert starring the world's greatest artists, like Beethoven, Leonardo da Vinci, and William Shakespeare.
9	4	"Series 2 Episode 4"	David Crichton	Bob Block	8 June 1976
Mr Claypole is capable of shrinking things to a fraction of their normal size. This talent persuades Rentaghost to go into the storage business—but there is one shrinkage that nobody expects.
10	5	"Series 2 Episode 5"	Unknown	Bob Block	15 June 1976
Efficiency is required in the Rentaghost office. The arrival of a ghost efficiency expert causes more chaos than ever!
11	6	"Series 2 Episode 6"	Unknown	Bob Block	22 June 1976
Rentanews Agency is formed by Mr Meaker, and the three ghosts become ace reporters. Their big 'scoop' would be an interview with the famous psychiatrist, Dr Springveldt—but Dr Springveldt is publicity-shy and does not like reporters.

=== Series 3 (1977) ===
No. overall	No. in series	Title	Directed by	Written by	Original release date
12	1	"Series 3 Episode 1"	Unknown	Bob Block	22 February 1977
The ghostly trio return, managed by their agent Mr Meaker. Disastrous results occur when they decide to give people whatever weather they want—and the arrival of a new ghost, Catastrophe Kate, makes things worse.
13	2	"Series 3 Episode 2"	Unknown	Bob Block	1 March 1977
Mr Claypole is in a mischievous mood. When Mr Meaker wishes that he received as much attention as his wife gives to their budgie, Mr Claypole overhears and a spell gets out of hand.
14	3	"Series 3 Episode 3"	Unknown	Bob Block	8 March 1977
The ghosts are helping Mr and Mrs Meaker with their amateur variety show. Their help turns the variety into comedy and chaos.
15	4	"Series 3 Episode 4"	Unknown	Bob Block	15 March 1977
When the Rentaghost trio are forced to move out of their premises, other occupants move in—they're ghosts, too!
16	5	"Series 3 Episode 5"	Renny Rye	Bob Block	22 March 1977
Mr Mumford's parsnips are not as big as he'd like them to be; a simple spell should fix that. But Mr Claypole's spell is not as simple as it should be!
17	6	"Series 3 Episode 6"	Unknown	Bob Block	29 March 1977
The ghosts win £500 on Premium Bonds and decide to use it to treat Harold Meaker as a gesture of appreciation. Unfortunately the events of the previous few weeks have placed Mr Meaker on the verge of a nervous breakdown and he gets the wrong idea...

=== Series 4 (1978) ===
This series was accompanied by a Christmas special, which was the last episode in the show to feature the characters of Fred Mumford and Hubert Davenport.

No. overall	No. in series	Title	Directed by	Written by	Original release date
18	1	"Series 4 Episode 1"	David Crichton	Bob Block	14 September 1978
The ghosts have a chance to become a nationwide success with Rentapotion, until Mr Claypole mistakes a potion's power and Hazel the McWitch arrives on the scene.
19	2	"Series 4 Episode 2"	David Crichton	Bob Block	21 September 1978
Mr Meaker's efforts to open a gentleman's tailoring shop push the ghosts to their limits, so they go on strike—and visit the seaside.
20	3	"Series 4 Episode 3"	Unknown	Bob Block	28 September 1978
Ethel Meaker is suffering the after-effects of being a Cocker Spaniel. Her barking alarms the neighbours and leads to a row with her husband. The Ghostly Trio attempt to smooth things over—with the help of Catastrophe Kate.
21	4	"Series 4 Episode 4"	David Crichton	Bob Block	5 October 1978
With the help of Hazel the McWitch, the ghosts open a restaurant, but their plans misfire and Hazel is dismissed—she decides to take her revenge.
22	5	"Series 4 Episode 5"	Unknown	Bob Block	12 October 1978
Mrs Meaker is worried that her husband will injure himself while keeping fit—and the Mumfords need a hand to move a heavy cooker. Perhaps the Ghostly Trio will help? That's a mistake!
23	6	"Series 4 Episode 6"	Unknown	Bob Block	19 October 1978
The Rentaghost Charity Fete Committee consists of Mr Mumford, Mr Davenport, Mr Claypole, Mr and Mrs Meaker—and Catastrophe Kate. With four spooks involved, it's a fete worse than death!

=== Christmas special (1979) ===
No. overall	No. in series	Title	Directed by	Written by	Original release date
24	7	"RentaSanta"	Unknown	Bob Block	19 December 1979
Christmas with Rentaghost: the ghostly trio are engaged as Santa Clauses by a department store while the Meakers prepare for an amateur production of Aladdin. It's Christmas chaos when the festive frolics get out of hand! Mr. Claypole's antics cause problems as he brings a pantomime horse, Dobbin, to life... and finds he cannot undo the spell. (This episode had been due to air a year earlier on 21 December 1978, but industrial action at the BBC prevented it.)

=== Series 5 (1980) ===
No. overall	No. in series	Title	Directed by	Written by	Original release date
25	1	"Series 5 Episode 1"	Unknown	Bob Block	7 March 1980
Fred and Hubert have left for an extended tour of stately home hauntings, and so Mr. Claypole recruits two new members of Rentaghost: Hazel McWitch and Tamara Novek. Meanwhile, Dobbin learns how to transport himself and continues to cause problems for the Meakers.
26	2	"Series 5 Episode 2"	Unknown	Bob Block	11 March 1980
Mr Meaker is sick in bed and the ghosts have to look after him. Mrs Meaker decides to become a professional singer and develops a voice which can shatter glass. Mr and Mrs Perkins decide to have the Meakers investigated by a private detective.
27	3	"Series 5 Episode 3"	Unknown	Bob Block	14 March 1980
Mrs Meaker's glass-shattering voice now breaks wood, thanks to Mr Claypole! A singer is needed at Painting's Roller Disco, so Mr Meaker sees a way to get Ethel out of the house.
28	4	"Series 5 Episode 4"	Unknown	Bob Block	18 March 1980
Why is there chaos in Painting's Beauty Boutique? Who is Auntie Meg? Why does Ethel wear a dress in the bath? And how does Meaker manage to upset the Perkins this week?
29	5	"Series 5 Episode 5"	Unknown	Bob Block	21 March 1980
The plot thickens when it's invention time. Claypole and McWitch compete for the best invention. the Pooping Tom is now a Snooper, Tamara becomes a Private Eyeball, Ethel can't say "no", Meaker keeps a stiff upper petal, the Perkins are poetic, and Painting gives a party.

=== Series 6 (1981) ===
No. overall	No. in series	Title	Directed by	Written by	Original release date
30	1	"Series 6 Episode 1"	Unknown	Bob Block	24 April 1981
The Meakers arrive by flying carpet to live next door to the Perkins; Ethel gets stuck on a chimney in an armchair with the Horse on her lap; Nadia Popov, a new ghost, joins Claypole in a Flying Bath and Hazel's dream potion perplexes the police!
31	2	"Series 6 Episode 2"	Unknown	Bob Block	1 May 1981
Meaker becomes a champion ice skater to promote Painting's new skates. The spooks get spots from powerful potions. The Perkins persuade a psychiatrist to peruse the neighbours. Nadia falls in love with Harold and Painting becomes a copy of a Painting.
32	3	"Series 6 Episode 3"	Unknown	Bob Block	8 May 1981
The horse is hiding under the table; the tortoise is racing round the house; the budgie is trying to break the door down; the kitten has just tried to eat the milkman and Mrs Perkins has a geranium on her cranium ...
33	4	"Series 6 Episode 4"	Unknown	Bob Block	15 May 1981
Nadia becomes a ping-pong ball, the horse becomes a pantomime Pegasus, Meaker becomes a green doll, Painting becomes a teddy bear and the Perkins put on a cabaret for Dr Newman!
34	5	"Series 6 Episode 5"	Unknown	Bob Block	22 May 1981
35	6	"Series 6 Episode 6"	Unknown	Bob Block	29 May 1981

=== Series 7 (1982) ===
No. overall	No. in series	Title	Directed by	Written by	Original release date
36	1	"Series 7 Episode 1"	David Crichton	Bob Block	5 October 1982
More madness when the Meakers lose their holiday. Painting loses his weight, the Perkins lose their tempers, and a Royal Command Performance for Queen Matilda hears the beat of dancing feet on 42nd Street!
37	2	"Series 7 Episode 2"	Unknown	Bob Block	12 October 1982
38	3	"Series 7 Episode 3"	David Crichton	Bob Block	19 October 1982
A holiday of havoc at the seaside when Claypole makes a Spanish galleon materialise whose pirate owner turns Ethel Meaker into half a herring!
39	4	"Series 7 Episode 4"	Unknown	Bob Block	26 October 1982
40	5	"Series 7 Episode 5"	Unknown	Bob Block	2 November 1982
41	6	"Series 7 Episode 6"	Unknown	Bob Block	9 November 1982
42	7	"Series 7 Episode 7"	Unknown	Bob Block	16 November 1982
43	8	"Series 7 Episode 8"	Unknown	Bob Block	23 November 1982
44	9	"Series 7 Episode 9"	Unknown	Bob Block	30 November 1982
45	10	"Series 7 Episode 10"	Unknown	Bob Block	7 December 1982
46	11	"Series 7 Episode 11"	David Crichton	Bob Block	14 December 1982
The ghosts put on a fashion show at Adam Painting's store by using magic mannequins.
47	12	"Series 7 Episode 12"	Unknown	Bob Block	21 December 1982
Ethel can't sleep through worrying about her upcoming amateur pantomime, and has had insomnia for three nights running. There seems only one cure - McWitch's dream potion, which gives her a dream of everyone in a musical pantomime.
48	13	"Series 7 Episode 13"	Unknown	Bob Block	29 December 1982

=== Series 8 (1983) ===
No. overall	No. in series	Title	Directed by	Written by	Original release date
49	1	"Series 8 Episode 1"	Unknown	Bob Block	18 October 1983
Mr. Meaker decides to take Ethel on a camping trip – but when he asks the ghosts to help him set up the camp site, things don't go smoothly.
50	2	"Series 8 Episode 2"	David Crichton	Bob Block	25 October 1983
Adam Painting is having problems with his new restaurant due to staff walkouts and exorbitant heating bills. He decides the ideal people to resolve his issues are the spooks at Rentaghost.
51	3	"Series 8 Episode 3"	Jeremy Swan	Bob Block	1 November 1983
Queen Matilda returns from the spirit world with the desire to experience life as a commoner – a job vacancy as a cleaner for the Perkins seems too good an opportunity to miss.
52	4	"Series 8 Episode 4"	David Crichton	Bob Block	8 November 1983
Mr. Claypole celebrates his 860th birthday with some fun and games. Unfortunately for the next door neighbours, the Perkins, their nervous Aunt Mabel is coming to visit.
53	5	"Series 8 Episode 5"	Jeremy Swan and David Crichton	Bob Block	15 November 1983
Adam Painting wants the ghosts to help out in his department store. Unfortunately, things are complicated by McWitch's dream potions, and the return of Whatsiname Smith.

=== Series 9 (1984) ===
No. overall	No. in series	Title	Directed by	Written by	Original release date
54	1	"Series 9 Episode 1"	David Crichton	Bob Block	9 October 1984
The Meakers' cellar is occupied by a fire-breathing dragon.
55	2	"Series 9 Episode 2"	David Crichton	Bob Block	16 October 1984
When Whatsisname Smith says "jump!", everybody jumps. But the jumpiest of all is the Perkins' Aunt Mabel!
56	3	"Series 9 Episode 3"	David Crichton	Bob Block	23 October 1984
After falling off Mount Everest, Ethel decides to tell the Perkins about the Spooks. Susie Starlight helps her, Claypole and Nadia hinder her; and the dreaded McDonald McDougal witchnaps Hazel!
57	4	"Series 9 Episode 4"	David Crichton	Bob Block	30 October 1984
The Meakers' car is still in the Perkins' kitchen and none of the Spooks can remember the correct spell for getting it out! Could things possibly get worse? Yes!
58	5	"Series 9 Episode 5"	David Crichton	Bob Block	6 November 1984
Claypole's self-propelled bed and McWitch's appearance-changing potion have got to be tested, and who better than on the Meakers – heh, heh, heh!
