= Pardon My Genie =

British children's television comedy series (1972–1973)

- Genre: Children's television series
- Created by: Bob Block
- Written by: Bob Block
- Directed by: Robert Reed; Vic Hughes
- Starring: Ellis Jones; Roy Barraclough; Hugh Paddick; Joe Dunlop; Lynnette Erving; Arthur White
- Country of origin: United Kingdom
- Original language: English
- No. of seasons: 2
- No. of episodes: 26

Production
- Producer: Daphne Shadwell
- Running time: c.25 minutes

Original release
- Network: ITV
- Release: 10 April 1972 – 23 April 1973

Pardon My Genie is a children's comedy series produced by British ITV contractor Thames Television, and written by Bob Block, who later created Rentaghost.

The premise was that a magic genie (Hugh Paddick in the first series, Arthur White in the second series) appeared in present-day Britain, summoned by a young apprentice named Hal Adden, a pun that goes some way towards characterising the series. Various comical misunderstandings arise, primarily aimed at youngsters. Arthur White replaced Paddick for the second run of thirteen episodes. Throughout both series, Hal was played by Ellis Jones, with Roy Barraclough as his long-suffering boss, Mr. Cobbledick. In achieving "magic" effects, it contains examples of early "blue-screen" technology.

The first series of thirteen episodes was released on DVD on 22 September 2009. The second series of thirteen episodes was released on 1 July 2013.

== Series overview ==
Series	Episodes	Originally released	
Series	Episodes	First released	Last released
1	13	10 April 1972	3 July 1972
2	13	29 January 1973	23 April 1973

== Episodes ==
=== Series 1 (1972) ===
No. overall	No. in series	Title	Directed by	Written by	Original release date
1	1	"The Apprentice's Sorcerer"	Robert Reed	Bob Block	10 April 1972
2	2	"Travel by Sleeper"	Robert Reed	Bob Block	17 April 1972
3	3	"This Unhappy Breed"	Daphne Shadwell	Bob Block	24 April 1972
4	4	"My Fête Is Killing Me"	Robert Reed	Bob Block	1 May 1972
5	5	"If Opportunity Knocks - I'm Out"	Daphne Shadwell	Bob Block	8 May 1972
6	6	"It's a Small World"	Daphne Shadwell	Bob Block	15 May 1972
7	7	"Sink or Swim"	Robert Reed	Bob Block	22 May 1972
8	8	"Sister, Dear Sister"	Daphne Shadwell	Larry Parker	29 May 1972
9	9	"Comic Cuts"	Daphne Shadwell	Bob Block	5 June 1972
10	10	"Second Coat"	Robert Reed	Bob Block	12 June 1972
11	11	"Genie with the Long Brown Hair"	Daphne Shadwell	Bob Block	19 June 1972
12	12	"Up, Up and Away"	Robert Reed	Bob Block	26 June 1972
13	13	"Fired with Enthusiasm"	Daphne Shadwell	Bob Block	3 July 1972

=== Series 2 (1973) ===
No. overall	No. in series	Title	Directed by	Written by	Original release date
14	1	"Someone Else in Mind"	Daphne Shadwell	Bob Block	29 January 1973
15	2	"Saloon Satellite"	Daphne Shadwell	Bob Block	5 February 1973
16	3	"Chicken Feud"	Vic Hughes	Bob Block	12 February 1973
17	4	"Commercial Success"	Daphne Shadwell	Bob Block	19 February 1973
18	5	"Luck Is No Lady"	Vic Hughes	Bob Block	26 February 1973
19	6	"Giddy Spells"	Daphne Shadwell	Bob Block	5 March 1973
20	7	"The Shoddy Bodyguard"	Vic Hughes	Bob Block	12 March 1973
21	8	"Early Clothing Day"	Daphne Shadwell	Bob Block	19 March 1973
22	9	"Your Present Is Requested"	Daphne Shadwell	Bob Block	26 March 1973
23	10	"Hat Trick"	Vic Hughes	Bob Block	2 April 1973
24	11	"Forget Me Not"	Vic Hughes	Bob Block	9 April 1973
25	12	"Too Many Cooks"	Vic Hughes	Bob Block	16 April 1973
26	13	"Temporary Interference"	Daphne Shadwell	Bob Block	23 April 1973
