= Michael Tarn =

British actor (born 1953)

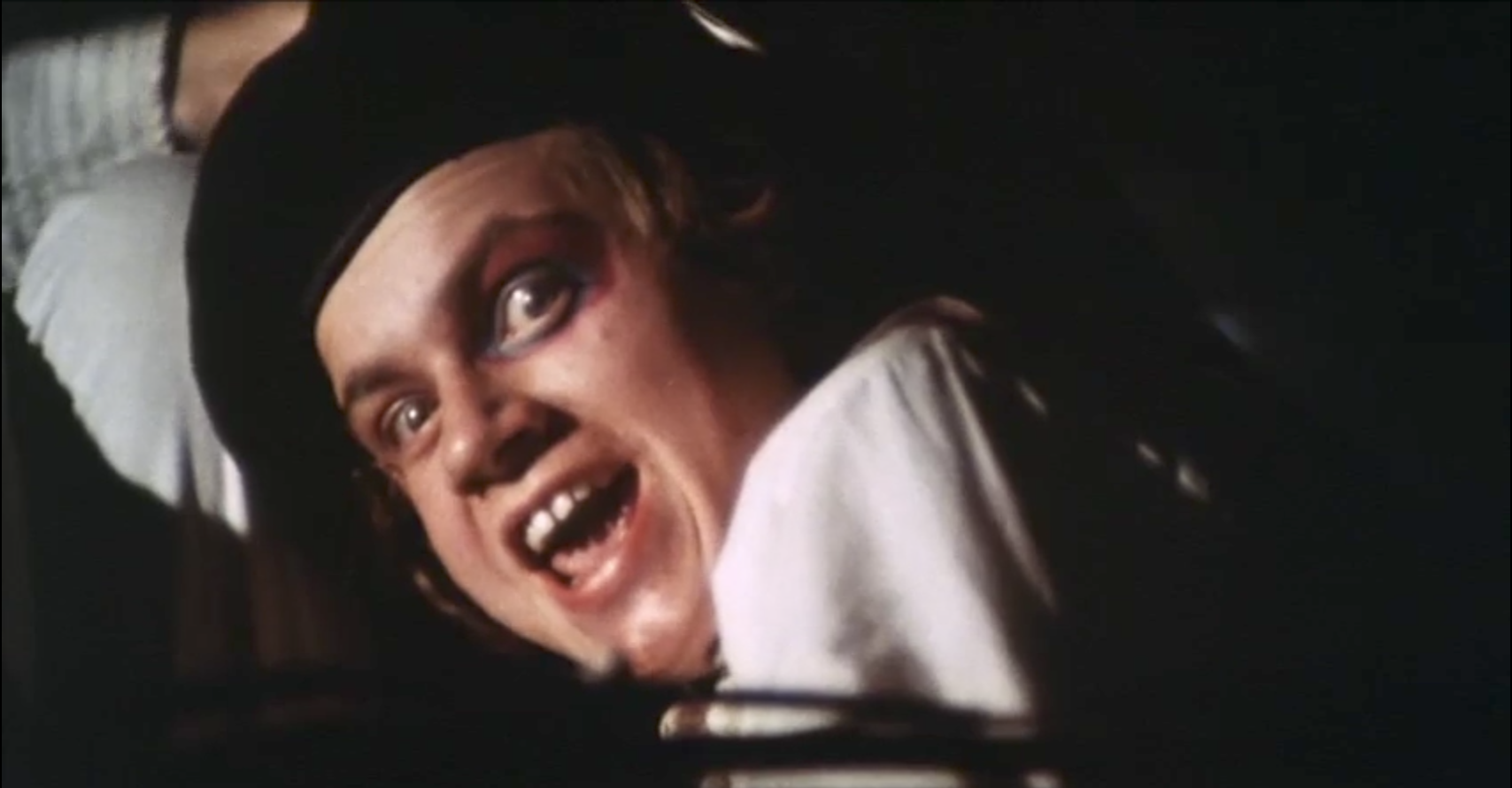
- Tarn in A Clockwork Orange
- Born: 18 December 1953 (age 72); London, England
- Occupation: Actor
- Years active: 1970–present
- Notable work: A Clockwork Orange

Michael Tarn (born 18 December 1953) is a British actor. He is best known for playing Pete in Stanley Kubrick's film A Clockwork Orange (1971).

== Biography ==
Michael Tarn was born in London in 1953 to a father who worked as a stuntman in the film industry. He is married with one son, Chris, who works in lighting, and one daughter. In the mid 2000s, he and his wife moved to Spain but returned to the United Kingdom a few years later for family reasons.

== Career ==
=== Early career ===
He had attended Italia Conti Academy of Theatre Arts part time since he was around ten or eleven years old and found work as a teenager as a background extra in television productions. While he was in grammar school, he landed a role as Fleance in a production of Macbeth at the Royal Shakespeare Company, featuring Paul Scofield and Vivien Merchant. On one night, around sixty of his classmates came to see Tarn in the show; during that show, the actor who played the third apparition fell ill, so Tarn stepped in, and had what he described at "ffiteen seconds of glory" of him and Paul Scofield on stage.

=== A Clockwork Orange ===
In summer 1969, the Italia Conti academy was one of many schools that were given a phone call from Stanley Kubrick's casting directors looking for fourteen to fifteen year old boys for an upcoming film, A Clockwork Orange; Tarn was sent over to audition at fifteen years old, and was given the final slot of the day for a five minute audition.

When Tarn found out he got the job, he was working a saturday job selling electric shavers in Kingston upon Thames when he received a phone call from his agent that he got the part, however because so much time had passed since the audition, he forgot it ever happened and at first was confused when his agent told him he "got the part as Pete" until he discovered it was for the production of A Clockwork Orange.

Tarn's character, Pete, was a part of Alex DeLarge's "droog" gang, and was the only of the droog actors (Tarn, Warren Clarke, James Marcus) who was actually a teenager at the time, as Clarke and Marcus were in their mid to late 20s (Malcolm McDowell was also in his late 20s at the time).

=== Later career ===
Tarn played the title character in the three-part series Zigger Zagger in September/October 1975, which eventually became a stage show that did not feature Michael. In 1976, his father was asked to be a stuntman on the film At the Earth's Core, and managed to get Michael a role as a dinosaur on the film, which he notes as his "biggest part in film".

By the late 1970s, Tarn was still acting but noticed that directors kept casting him to play teenagers, despite pushing thirty, and when playing these typecast roles, mentioned that he felt like "Warren (Clarke) and Jimmy (James Marcus) must have felt when I'd come in (A Clockwork Orange audition) as a teenager and they were playing teenagers".

Tarn's career began slowing down when he received an audition for an upcoming sitcom, only for the role to be turned down by his agent on his behalf (even though Michael had no say in the agreement) as he thought Michael was "worth more money (than what) they were offering" and according to Tarn, "when he declined that (audition), the industry doors closed on me".

Tarn, who had just got married and had a child on the way, decided to stop acting and start teaching drama with his wife, eventually forming their own drama group. He played small roles occasional roles, his last being in the 2002 film Shooters as Vic.

== Filmography ==
=== Film ===
Year	Title	Role	Note
1971	A Clockwork Orange	Pete	
1972	Made	Charlie	
1976	At the Earth's Core	Dinosaur	Uncredited
1999	Stanley and Us	Himself	
2002	Shooters	Vic	

Year	Title	Role	Note
1973	Owen, M.D.	Ben	One episode
1973	Marked Personal	Russ Riley	Two episodes
1974	Intimate Strangers	Dale	One episode
1975	Shades of Greene	Third boy	One episode
1975	Zigger Zagger	Zigger Zagger	Three episodes
1975	It's a Lovely Day Tomorrow	Michael Ellis	Television movie
1975—1976	Play for Today	Charlie Jackson (1975) Mark (1976)	Two episodes
1978	1990	John Brooks	One episode
1978	The Sweeney	Charlie Pearce	One episode
1979	Scum	Background extra	Uncredited
1979	Thundercloud	L.S. Hodge	One episode
1979	Shoestring	Radio technician	One episode
1979	Apprentice for Living	unknown	
1981	Thicker than Water	Malcolm Lockwood	Unaired pilot
1995	Hamish Macbeth	Mick Jensie	Uncredited
1995	Empire of the Censors	Himself	Archive footage
2006	O Lucky Malcolm!	Pete	Archive footage
2011	Turning Like Clockwork	Pete	Archive footage
2015	Six Different Kinds of Light John Alcott	Pete	Archive footage
2018	The Directors	Himself	Archive footage

=== Theatre ===
Year	Show
1972—1973	Peter Pan
1976	Jumper et al

=== Podcasts ===
Year	Title
2021	David Kis Podcast
2021	Kubrick's Universe: The Stanley Kubrick Podcast
