= Robert's Robots =

British children's TV series (1973–1974)

- Genre: Children's television series
- Written by: Bob Block
- Directed by: Vic Hughes
- Starring: John Clive
- Country of origin: United Kingdom
- Original language: English
- No. of series: 2
- No. of episodes: 14

Production
- Producer: Vic Hughes

Original release
- Network: ITV (CITV)
- Release: 12 November 1973 – 23 December 1974

Robert's Robots is a British children's television show that ran from 1973–1974 on ITV. Robert Sommerby is the inventor of the robots, and he lives with Aunt Millie.

== Cast ==
The cast included John Clive as Robert, Nigel Pegram, Sylvester McCoy, Christopher Biggins and Jenny Hanley.

== Episodes ==
=== Series one ===
1. "Follow That Robot" 12 November 1973
2. "Love at First Light" 19 November 1973
3. "A Spanner in the Works" 26 November 1973
4. "Dial C for Chaos" 3 December 1973
5. "A Long, Cold Sommerby" 10 December 1973
6. "Kill or Cure" 17 December 1973
7. "Double Trouble" 24 December 1973

=== Series two ===
1. "One of Our Robots Is Missing", 11 November 1974
2. "A Full Head of Steam", 18 November 1974
3. "I Spy with My Little Ear", 25 November 1974
4. "Courting Disaster", 2 December 1974
5. "Gastronomics Anonymous", 9 December 1974
6. "Rampaging Robots", 16 December 1974
7. "Santa Claus-Trophobia", 23 December 1974
