= Tank Malling =

1989 U.K. based thriller film directed by James Marcus

Tank Malling (re-released as Beyond Soho in the UK and Crossfire in America) is a 1989 British thriller film directed by James Marcus and starring Ray Winstone. The film was written by James Marcus and Mick Southworth. Graham Thomas worked as the producer and on the early development of the script.

The film was released in the USA under the title Double Cross and in Canada as Double Intrigue. In the UK it was later re-released as Beyond Soho after being re-edited.

== Plot ==
A nightmare of vice and corruption stretching to the very heart of the Police force to the Cabinet. Tank (Ray Winstone) is an investigative reporter and jailbird, framed on scant evidence supplied by the London mob. Helen (Amanda Donohoe) is the sensuous call-girl who offers Tank ammunition and retribution. Retaliation is swift and brutal, in the guise of Sir Robert Knight (Peter Wyngarde) and his equally lethal lawyer, Dunboyne (Jason Connery). A series of hideous murders follow as the devil protects his own.

== Cast ==
- Ray Winstone as John "Tank" Malling
- Jason Connery as Dunboyne
- Amanda Donohoe as Helen Searle
- Glen Murphy as Cashman
- Marsha A. Hunt as Salena
- Peter Wyngarde as Sir Robert Knight
- John Conteh as Albert
- Terry Marsh as "Curly"
- Nick Berry as Joe McGrath
- John Bett as Campbell Sinclaire
- Jamie Foreman as Danny
- Don Henderson as Percy
- Maria Whittaker as Maria
- Elizabeth Hickling as Monique
- Melissa Wilkes as Katy Reed
- Craig Fairbrass as Jackie
- Jess Conrad as Celebrity
- Carol Harrison as Sonia
- Paula Ann Bland as Stripper
- Jimmy Batten as Security Guard

== Legacy ==
The film was received to critical acclaim in 1989 and proved to be pivotal in the careers of many of the film's actors.

The most successful legacy from the film was the soundtrack which was written by 10cc's Rick Fenn and Pink Floyd's Nick Mason and was their final album together as a working duo.

Scenes from the film were made at the 1989 Surrey County Show at Stoke Park in Guildford.

== Soundtrack ==
The soundtrack for Tank Malling was written and performed by 10cc's Rick Fenn and Pink Floyd's Nick Mason. The soundtrack had one single released, a double A-side featuring "Strangers in Paradise" by Chris Thompson and "See You in Paradise" sung by Maggie Reilly. No official soundtrack album was ever released.
