= Ellis Jones (actor) =

British director and actor (born 1943)

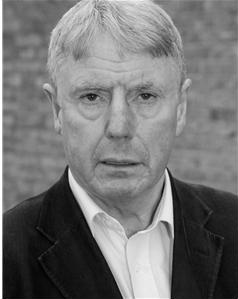
- Born: Peter Ellis Jones; 15 November 1943 (age 82); Petersfield, Hampshire, England
- Occupations: Film director, actor

Peter Ellis Jones (born 15 November 1943) is a British actor, director and acting coach known for his extensive work in theatre, television, and education. In the 1970s, he was known for his acting roles before transitioning to directing and teaching. He has held positions in institutions such as the Royal Academy of Dramatic Art (RADA).

== Career ==
Jones was born in Petersfield and spent his early years in Cardiff before moving to Hull, where he went to a co-educational grammar school, Kingston High. Keen to go on stage, he worked for a while at the New Theatre before doing a degree at Manchester University. There, he was tutored by Stephen Joseph and joined his repertory company in Scarborough, thus beginning his acting career.

He appeared in popular British TV shows such as the sitcom The Squirrels and the children's fantasy series Pardon My Genie.

Jones began directing in 1978 under Stephen Barry in Harrogate with a production of Harold Pinter's play The Caretaker.

First appearing as an actor for Century Theatre (the precursor of the Theatre by the Lake) in Keswick in 1981, Jones returned the following year to direct Taking Steps for the company. After subsequent returns as guest director during the 1980s, he was appointed associate director in 1984 after being awarded an Arts Council Associate Director's Bursary. In 1988, he starred in a one-man show about actor-manager David Garrick at St Mary's College, Twickenham. Promoted to artistic director in 1990, he held this position for the next three years.

In 1993, Jones joined the RADA as Head of Acting, becoming vice principal in 1998 and creative director of RADA Enterprises from 2003 to 2009. He contributed to the training of numerous notable actors including Maxine Peake.

In 2003, he created a programme of classic plays featuring RADA graduates on board the Cunard ocean liner the Queen Mary 2. Whilst working with the Shanghai Theatre Academy, he directed the first-ever Chinese language production of the aforementioned Taking Steps.

Having worked extensively in recent years in theatre training, directing and producing, Jones recently made a cautious return to performing, as understudy to Kenneth Cranham in London's West End and on tour in Florian Zeller's award-winning play The Father, and since then has been quite busy in film and television. One such role was in the 2022 television series The Thief, His Wife and the Canoe.

Jones is a member of the management committee at Garrick's Temple to Shakespeare, as well as being a volunteer guide to the landmark.

== Work as a director and author ==
Jones has directed numerous theatrical productions, including Miss Wilson's Waterloo at the Finborough Theatre. His adaptation of Charles Dickens' novel The Pickwick Papers was presented at Everyman Theatre, Cheltenham to celebrate their centenary on 1 October 1991.

He is the author of the book Acting Yourself, part of the Teach Yourself series.

== Acting ==
=== Theatre ===
- An Inspector Calls as The Inspector
- Abigail's Party as Laurence
- A Midsummer Night's Dream as Quince
- Toad of Toad Hall as Mole
- Richard III as Clarence
- The Country Wife as Sparkish

=== Television and film ===
- Doctor Who: Spearhead from Space: Episode 1 (1970) (BBC) as Technician. Director: Derek Martinus.
- Pardon My Genie (1972–73) (ITV) as Hal. Director: Daphne Shadwell.
- King Lear (1974) (ITV) as The Fool. Director: Tony Davenall.
- The Squirrels (1974-77) (ITV) as Burke. Director: Shaun O'Riordan.
- Measure for Measure (1979) (BBC) as Elbow. Director: Desmond Davis.
- Lady Killers (1981) (ITV) as Harry Taylor.
- Love Story: Wilfred and Eileen (1981) (BBC) as Bennett. Director: David Green.
- 1914 All Out (1987) (ITV) as Dr Napley. Director: David Green.
- Cadfael: A Morbid Taste for Bones (1996) (ITV) as Father Ianto. Director: Richard Stroud.
