= James Marcus (English actor) =

English actor (1942–2020)

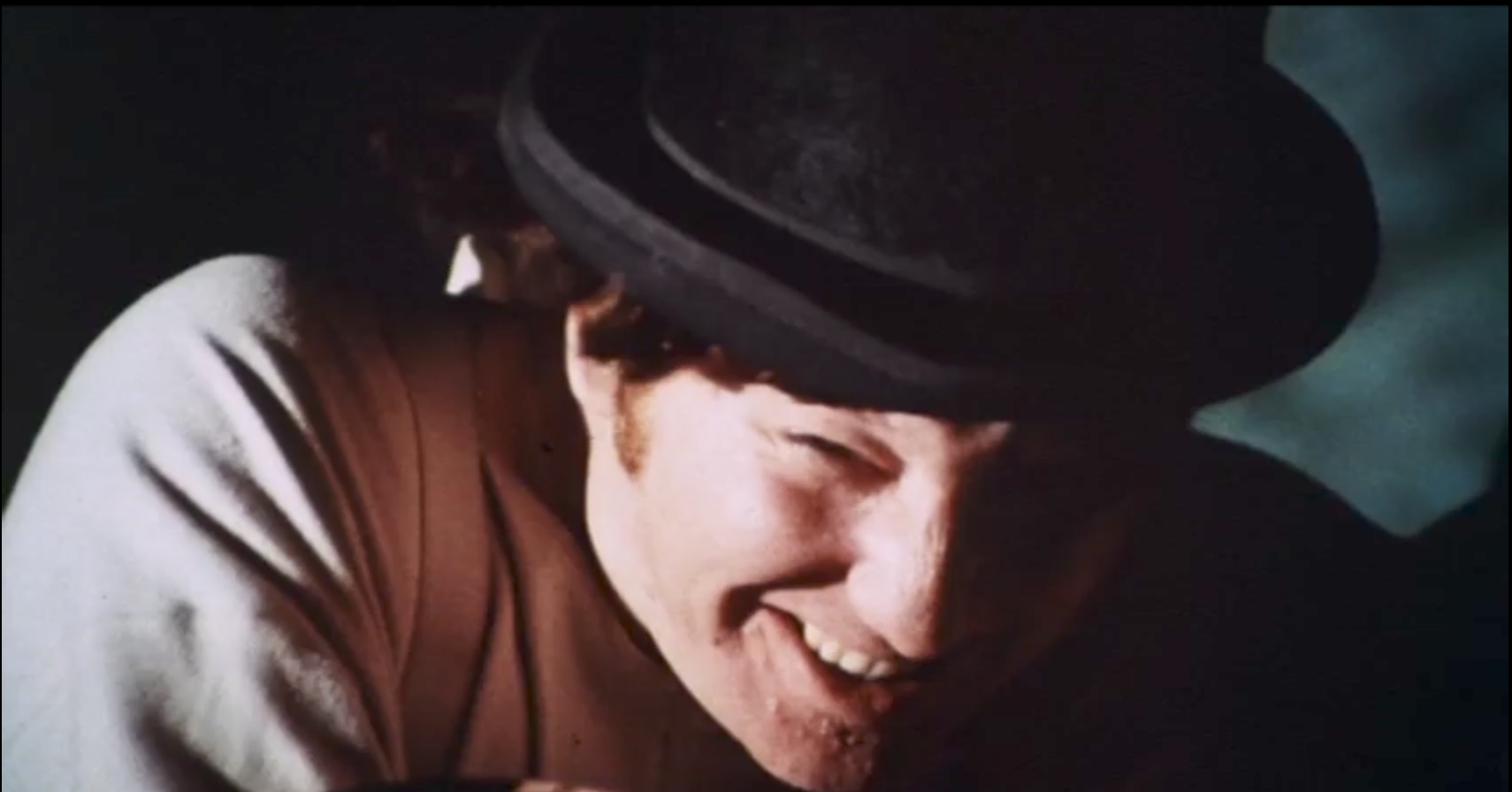
- Marcus in A Clockwork Orange
- Born: Brian Terence James; 23 June 1942; Romford, Essex, England
- Died: 4 May 2020 (aged 77); Lambeth, London, England
- Years active: 1968–2001

James Marcus (born Brian Terence James, 23 June 1942 – 4 May 2020) was a British actor. He is best known for his performance as Georgie, one of the droogs in Stanley Kubrick's controversial film A Clockwork Orange (1971).

== Life and career ==
Marcus was born as Brian Terence James in Romford, Essex on 23 June 1942. Before becoming an apprentice printer, he spent the majority of his teenage life performing gigs. After studying acting courses at the 15 Drama School in London, he had several roles in plays based on the works of William Shakespeare. His first appearance on TV was the BBC show Hello, Good Evening and Welcome (1968). He also landed a role in the 1969 war comedy The Virgin Soldiers.

In 1970, Kubrick got in touch with the young actor for an audition for his upcoming project, an adaptation of Anthony Burgess's novel A Clockwork Orange. Apart from his fight scenes, Kubrick was also impressed by James's dark demeanour and this won him the role. During filming, Kubrick described James as "very professional".

His other television appearances include UFO, Softly, Softly: Task Force, The Sweeney, Doctor Who, Z-Cars and The Professionals. He also appeared in the Robin Askwith vehicle Let's Get Laid (1977) with John Clive, another Clockwork Orange actor. He also appeared in The Naked Civil Servant (1975) with John Hurt, and McVicar (1980) with Roger Daltrey. Marcus also appeared in the Thames Television comedy-drama Minder episode "It's a Sorry Lorry Morrie" (1989) in the role of a hard man named Morrie, and in the nostalgic Yorkshire Television series Heartbeat as Clive Loxton, a private investigator, in the episode "Blood Sports" (1995).

One of his other memorable roles is that of station officer Sidney Tate in the pilot and series 1–3 of the popular LWT fire fighting drama London's Burning. He also directed the nihilistic Tank Malling (1989), which featured Ray Winstone.

In August 2024, acting union Equity announced that Marcus had died. It transpired that Marcus had died four years prior, on 4 May 2020, at the age of 77.

== List of credits ==
=== Television ===
Year	Title	Role	Other notes
1969	The Doctors	Postman	1 episode
1970	The Borderers	Stallholder	1 episode
1970	Manhunt	Private	1 episode
1970	Special Branch	L.A.C. Higgs	1 episode
1971	UFO	SHADO Operative	1 episode
1971	Softly Softly: Task Force	Jeff	1 episode
1974	Doctor at Sea	Eddie	1 episode
1974	The Chinese Puzzle	Johnson	6 episodes
1974	Doctor Who: Invasion of the Dinosaurs	Peasant	1 episode
1975	The Sweeney	Myles	1 episode
1978	Doctor Who: Underworld	Rask	
1979-1984	Grandad	Bert Bamford	
1980–1989	Minder	Bertie/Phil/Morrie	3 episodes
1981	The Chinese Detective	Charlie	2 episodes
1986	C.A.T.S Eyes	2nd Observer	1 episode
1986	Casualty	Bill	1 episode
1986–1990	London's Burning	Sidney Tate	22 episodes
1991	Dodgem	Tucker	3 episodes
1992–1995	Woof!	Sgt Caldwell	5 episodes
1993	You Bet!	Himself/Sidney Tate	
1995	Heartbeat	Clive Loxton	1 episode
2001	EastEnders	Sid	1 episode

=== Film ===
Year	Title	Role	Other notes
1969	The Virgin Soldiers		Uncredited
1971	A Clockwork Orange	Georgie	
1975	The Naked Civil Servant	Clerkenwell Tough	
1976	Escape from the Dark		
1978	Let's Get Laid	Rusper	
1980	McVicar	Det Sgt Sewell	
1980	Never Never Land	P.C. Stubbs	
