= Newman-Sinclair =

British camera manufacturer

Newman & Sinclair, London, was a manufacturer of film cameras whose first models appeared in 1927.

The first model was developed by Arthur Samuel Newman who produced the first camera body from Duralumin, a temperature-resistant, light metal. The first model with a 35-mm objective was hand-wound by a removable mechanism. A clockwork model was produced, powered by two powerful springs and while the earlier versions only had a basic parallax viewfinder a mirror-reflex version was made. The clockwork camera was used by the National Coal Board film unit for filming in underground pits where an electric camera could otherwise risk igniting explosive gas. Later models were battery powered. The Newman & Sinclair cameras allowed frame rates between 10 and 24 frames per second.

The camera was considered easily handled, due to its relative (!) light weight, and robustness, and for this reason it was considered an optimal camera for news reporting and documentary filming.

Well known documentary film makers such as Robert J. Flaherty, Humphrey Jennings, Damien Parer, and Basil Wright used this camera. Stanley Kubrick used this model of camera for A Clockwork Orange in a dubious way: in order to credibly film the suicide attempt of the character Alex, Kubrick dropped a Newman Sinclair camera into pavement six times, before it broke: it dropped lens first, breaking it. The camera was otherwise still working perfectly.
