= Arthur White (actor) =

British actor (born 1933)

- Born: 1933 (age 92–93); Finchley, Middlesex, England
- Occupation: Actor
- Relatives: David Jason (brother)

Arthur White (born 1933) is a British actor, best known for his occasional role as the collator (police archivist) Ernie Trigg in the crime drama A Touch of Frost, alongside his real-life younger brother David Jason. His parents were Arthur R White and Welsh-born Olwen Jones. He also appeared briefly along with his brother in two episodes of The Darling Buds of May.

In 1973, White played the part of the genie in the second series of the UK Children's TV show Pardon My Genie, replacing Hugh Paddick as the genie during the first series in 1972. In 1978, he appeared as part of an underworld gang, playing the role of Freddy in the 1970s British police drama The Professionals, in an episode entitled When the Heat Cools Off.

In 1994, White played the part of a lawnmower repair shop owner whose workshop was continually pestered by a poltergeist. This formed an episode called "Chris Robinson's Premonitions / Pete the Poltergeist" in the UK TV series Strange but True? hosted by Michael Aspel. In the film About a Boy, white played a role as a park keeper.

In 2007, White played Albert Fogarty in the Heartbeat episode "The Dreams That You Dream". In 2008, he worked with his brother again on the comic fantasy The Colour of Magic, where he played a character called "Rerpf".

In 2010, White featured in 13 Hours That Saved Britain, talking about his experiences of living during World War Two and living in London during the Blitz.

White has also made appearances in television series such as Object Z, Crossroads, The Professionals, London's Burning, As Time Goes By, Wycliffe, Family Affairs and The Prisoner episode "It's Your Funeral".
