= Michael Darbyshire =

English actor (1917–1979)

- Photo: 1939 Malvern Festival programme
- Born: 15 October 1917; St Pancras, London, England
- Died: 20 November 1979 (aged 62); Windsor, Berkshire, England

Michael Darbyshire (15 October 1917 – 20 November 1979) was an English actor of stage and screen. He played the role of Hubert Davenport, the Victorian ghost, in the BBC TV children's comedy series Rentaghost and one of the eccentric inventors in the 1968 film Chitty Chitty Bang Bang. On stage, he appeared in the original West End cast of the musical Pickwick in 1963, its Broadway transfer in 1965, and a BBC TV adaptation in 1969.

He was a member of the Players Theatre Company based in London in Villiers Street, appearing regularly and also on many occasions on the BBC TV series The Good Old Days.

Michael Darbyshire died in 1979, during the interval of the first performance of a production of the Ray Cooney farce, Chase Me Comrade, at the Theatre Royal, Windsor, aged 62. On the opening night, he played the first act splendidly. When he failed to respond to the call for the second act, he was found dead in his dressing room.

== Filmography ==
Year	Title	Role	Notes
1949	Vengeance Is Mine	Policeman	
1956	Charley Moon	Footman	Uncredited
1963	The Gentle Terror	Ticket clerk	
1968	Chitty Chitty Bang Bang	Inventor	
1969	Lock Up Your Daughters	La Verole	
1971	She'll Follow You Anywhere	Doctor	
1976	The Slipper and the Rose	Dancer	
