= Chris Chittell =

English actor (born 1948)

Chris Chittell BEM
- Born: Christopher John Chittell; 19 May 1948 (age 78); Aldershot, Hampshire, England
- Occupation: Actor
- Years active: 1964–Present
- Known for: Role of Eric Pollard in Emmerdale

Christopher John Chittell (born 19 May 1948) is an English actor, known for his role as Eric Pollard in the ITV soap opera Emmerdale. He has portrayed the role since 1986, making him the longest-serving cast member in the soap's history.

== Biography ==
=== Early life ===
Chittell was born in Aldershot, Hampshire. His father served in the Indian Army, and on leaving school Chittell intended to join the Royal Navy, but instead, he became a model. His first acting stint was in 1964, with the National Theatre, at Chichester Festival Theatre, in Peter Shaffer's The Royal Hunt of the Sun.

=== Career ===
He appeared as Potter in the 1967 film To Sir, with Love. In 1968 he appeared as a Trooper in The Charge of the Light Brigade, and made an uncredited appearance in If.... . This was followed by a starring role as one of the Freewheelers, made as an action/adventure children's serial by Southern Television between 1968 and 1973.

Chittell acted for two seasons in the 1970s science fiction TV drama The Tomorrow People. His other film appearances included roles in The Beast in the Cellar (1970), The Weekend Murders (1971), The Raging Moon (1971), The Last Valley (1971), Erotic Inferno (1975), Golden Rendezvous (1977), Zulu Dawn (1979) and Game for Vultures (1979). He also appeared in a number of Swedish sex films in the 1970s including Swedish Sex Games (aka The Intruders and Let Us Play Sex) in 1975 (which also featured a young Stellan Skarsgård).

He performed on stage at the Old Vic in Macbeth with Peter O'Toole. In 1972, Chittell appeared in the untransmitted Doomwatch episode "Sex and Violence", playing Dick Burns, widely believed to be a parody of Cliff Richard and Richard's part in the Nationwide Festival of Light. The "Sex and Violence" episode was included as part of the Doomwatch DVD box set release in April 2016.

== Honours ==
He was awarded the British Empire Medal (BEM) in the 2019 Birthday Honours for services to drama and charity.

== Filmography ==
Year	Title	Role	Notes
1967	To Sir, with Love	Potter	
1968	The Charge of the Light Brigade	Trooper	
1968	The Avengers	Bassin	
1968	If....	Senior	Uncredited
1970	The Breaking of Bumbo	The Prisoner	
1970	The Weekend Murders	Georgie Kemple	
1971	The Raging Moon	Terry	
1971	The Last Valley	Svenson	
1971	The Beast in the Cellar	Baker	
1971	They Call Him Cemetery	John McIntire	
1972	Doomwatch	Dick Burns	1 episode
1974	The Intruders	Richard	
1974	Man About The House	Alan	
1975	Erotic Inferno	Martin Barnard	
1977	Molly	Peter	
1977	Ta mej i dalen	Richard	
1977	Golden Rendezvous	Rogers	
1978	The Wild Geese	Philips	Uncredited
1978	Night Ride	TV movie	
1979	Zulu Dawn	Lt. Milne	
1979	Game for Vultures	McAllister	
1980	Les Visiteurs (The Visitors)	L'interprète (The Interpreter)	TV Mini Series. Episode entitled: Pirvii
1982	Triangle	Lorry Driver	TV series. Series 2. Episode 17
1984	Tucker's Luck	Junior	TV series. Recurring role
1986–present	Emmerdale	Eric Pollard	ITV Soap Opera. Series regular
