= John Clive =

British actor and author (1933–2012)

- Born: Clive John Frederick Hambley; 6 January 1933; North London, England, UK
- Died: 14 October 2012 (aged 79); UK
- Occupations: Actor & author
- Years active: 1953–2012
- Spouses: Carole White (m. 1968; div. 1989) Bryony Elliott (m. 2001)
- Children: Hannah Clive; Alexander Clive
- Website: johnclive.net

John Clive (6 January 1933 – 14 October 2012) was an English actor and author, known internationally for his historical and social fiction, such as KG200 and Barossa.

Clive was also an established British television and film actor. Beginning his career at the age of fourteen touring in rep, he went on to star on the West End stage, in plays such as Absurd Person Singular, The Wizard of Oz, Under Milk Wood, The Bandwagon at the Mermaid Theatre, The Winslow Boy, Young Woodley and Life with Father.

As a character actor he appeared in comic and straight acting roles in films, such as The Italian Job, Yellow Submarine, The Pink Panther Strikes Again, A Clockwork Orange and The Young Indiana Jones Chronicles. He was a member of the Carry On Team appearing in two of the Carry on series of comedy films; Carry On Abroad, and Carry On Dick Clive was initiated into the Grand Order of Water Rats in 1988.

== Career ==
Born Clive John Frederick Hambley on 6 January 1933 in London. He was still a child when his family moved to Liverpool, and in 1939 he was evacuated to North Wales.

Clive left school when he was 14 years old, and began working as a page at the New Shakespeare Theatre. He soon auditioned for plays and musicals, and was cast in singing roles in children's musicals and as an assistant to comedians in sketches. His first starring role was the lead in The Winslow Boy in 1938. He developed a keen interest in motion pictures as a teenager, especially for the films of Errol Flynn.

He spent his national service in the Royal Air Force, and then returned to acting. He toured the West Country in repertory theatre in plays such as Lady Windermere's Fan, Life With Father, and Young Woodley.

Clive soon moved to London, where he performed in revues at The Poor Millionaire club and the Buxton Club. He continued to find work on the stage, appearing in West End productions of Absurd Person Singular, Under Milk Wood, The Winslow Boy, and The Wonderful Wizard of Oz. He worked as a stand-up comedian and bingo caller between jobs.

== Acting ==
For his first film role, in Ealing Studios comedy The Magnet, he was credited as Clive Kendall, but he soon adopted the stage name John Clive. In the Beatles' animated film Yellow Submarine he provided the voice of John Lennon. His television appearances also included Robert's Robots, Rising Damp, The Dick Emery Show, The Perils of Pendragon, The Sweeney, Great Expectations and The History of Mr Polly.

He made his television debut in the seventh Wednesday Play Wear a Very Big Hat, broadcast by BBC 1 in 1964. Clive also featured in Lady Windermere's Fan, One Way Out and The Ten Percenters. He featured in a 1970s advert for Jacob's Coconut Cream Biscuits.

== Author ==
In 1977, he co-wrote the historical novel KG 200 with J.D. Gilman, a story about a secret Luftwaffe unit during the Second World War. This book was an international best-seller. The Last Liberator, followed in 1980 and was well received by literary critics. Barossa also achieved critical acclaim. Broken Wings was published in 1983 and matched the international success of KG 200. Other fictional titles written by Clive followed including Ark co-written with Nicholas Headin, in 1986 which also received good reviews and The Lions' Cage which was published in 1988.

== Death ==
John Clive died after a short illness on 14 October 2012 in England aged 79. In 2021, his daughter appeared on the BBC TV show The Repair Shop, to which she brought a model of the yellow submarine by Corgi Toys. This had been given to her father at the premiere of the film in which he voiced John Lennon. Steve Fletcher on The Repair Shop restored the model.

== Bibliography ==
- Clive, John and Gilman J. D. KG 200: The Force with no Face. Simon and Schuster (1977). ISBN 978-0-671-22890-3
- Clive, John. The Last Liberator. Hamlyn (1980). ISBN 0-600-20022-1
- Clive, John. Barossa. Delacorte Press (1981). ISBN 0-440-00433-0
- Clive, John. Broken Wings. Granada (1983). ISBN 978-0-586-05582-3
- Clive, John and Head, Nicholas. Ark. Penguin (1986). ISBN 978-0-14-007727-8
- Clive, John. The Lions Cage. Penguin (1988). ISBN 978-0-14-009289-9
- Clive, John. De leeuwekooi . Facet (1987). ISBN 90-5016-024-7 Translation to Dutch

== Filmography ==
=== Feature films ===
Credits include:

- The Magnet (1950) - The people of Merseyside
- Smashing Time (1967) - Sweeney Todd manager
- The Mini-Affair (1968) - Joe
- Yellow Submarine (1968) - John Lennon (voice)
- The Italian Job (1969) - Garage Manager
- A Nice Girl Like Me (1969) - Supermarket Shopper
- Carry On Henry (1971) - Court Dandy (scenes deleted)
- A Clockwork Orange (1971) - Stage Actor
- Four Dimensions of Greta (1972) - Phil the Greek
- Straight on Till Morning (1972) - Newsagent
- Go for a Take (1972) - Hotel Waiter
- Carry On Abroad (1972) - Robin
- Tiffany Jones (1973) - Stefan
- Carry On Dick (1974) - Isaac the Tailor
- Great Expectations (1974) - Mr. Wopsle
- Never Too Young to Rock (1976) - Bandsman
- No Longer Alone (1976) - Basil
- Queen Kong (1976) - Comedian
- The Pink Panther Strikes Again (1976) - Chuck
- Hardcore (1977) - Willi
- Stand Up, Virgin Soldiers (1977) - Man in wheelchair
- Rosie Dixon - Night Nurse (1978) - Grieves
- Let's Get Laid (1978) - Piers Horrabin
- Revenge of the Pink Panther (1978) - President's Aide
- RPM (1998) - Bentley Man (final film role)

=== Television ===
Credits include:

- The Wednesday Play (1965) - Billy Moffatt
- Watch the Birdies (1966) - Lenny
- Z-Cars (1967) - Fred

"Who Said Anything About the Law?: Part 2
"Who Said Anything About the Law?: Part 1

- The Saint (1967) - Garton
- The Informer (1967) - News photographer
- Man in a Suitcase (1967) - Clerk
- The Gnomes of Dulwich (1969) - Old

"Episode No.1.5"
"Episode No.1.4"
"Episode No.1.3"
"Episode No.1.2"
"Episode No.1.1"

- Here Come the Double Deckers (1971)
- Father, Dear Father (1971) - Auctioneer
- The Man Outside (1972) - Rosko
- The World of Cilla (1973)
- Great Expectations (1974) - Mr. Wopsle
- Robert's Robots (1973-1974) - Robert Sommerby / Robert Robot
- The Perils of Pendragon (1974) - Rosko
- The Sweeney (1975) - John Frewin
- How Green Was My Valley (1975-1976) - Cyfartha

"Episode No.1.6"
"Episode No.1.5"
"Episode No.1.4"
"Episode No.1.3"
"Episode No.1.2"

- The Galton and Simpson Playhouse (1977) - Man in Phonebox

"Naught for Thy Comfort"

- Rising Damp - (1977-1978) - Series 3.4 Good Samaritans - Mr. Grey
- Odd Man Out (1977) - TV Reporter
- The Chiffy Kids (1978) - Mr. Melrose
- Rings on Their Fingers (1978) - The Salesman

"Party Mood"

- Leave it to Charlie (1979) - Andy Kirk

"Money, Money, Money"

- The History of Mr. Polly (1980) - Hinks

"Episode No.1.4"
"Episode No.1.3"
"Episode No.1.2"

- The Nesbitts Are Coming (1980) - PC Emlyn Harris

"Moving Day"
"Look on the Black Side"
"Race Day"
"The Big Job"
"It's All a Game"

- A Dream of Alice (1982)
- Theatre Night (1985) - Mr. Dumby

Lady Windermere's Fan

- Screen One' (1989) - Prudoe

"One Way Out"

- T-Bag's Christmas Carol (1989) - Giles Pickens
- The 10 Percenters (1996) - Terry

"Surprise"

== Other credits ==
=== Documentaries ===
- Hamlet: The Video (1992)
- The Adventures of Young Indiana Jones: Espionage Escapades (2007)

=== Appearances in deleted scenes ===
- Carry On Henry / US: Carry on Henry VIII (1971) "Plotter"
