= Bob Block =

British radio and television comedy scriptwriter

Timothy Robert William Block
- Born: July 20, 1921; Plymouth, England
- Died: April 17, 2011 (aged 89)
- Occupation: Comedy scriptwriter
- Years active: 1950–1986
- Known for: Life with the Lyons, Rentaghost, Pardon My Genie, Robert's Robots

Bob Block (20 July 1921 – 17 April 2011) was a British radio and television comedy scriptwriter.

== Career ==
His earliest work was for radio, best known for co-writing the domestic sitcom Life with the Lyons for Ben Lyon, as well as working with Arthur Askey and Frankie Howerd.

Block was best known for writing television comedy series for children, including Pardon My Genie (1972–73), Robert's Robots (1974–75), Rentaghost (1976–84) and Galloping Galaxies (1985-86).

== Notable credits ==
=== Radio ===
- Variety Bandbox (1940s–1950s)
- Radio Rinso (1950)
- The Starlight Hour (1950)
- Life with the Lyons (1951–1961)
- Festival of Britain (1951)
- Arthur's Inn (1952)
- Discord in Three Flats (1962)

=== Television ===
- Our House (1960)
- That's My Boy (1963)
- Crackerjack (1964–1973)
- Hey Presto It's Rolf (1966)
- Broaden Your Mind (1968–1969)
- Ken Dodd and the Diddymen (1969–1970)
- The Dave King Show (1969–1970)
- Dave Allen At Large (1970–1979)
- Pardon My Genie (1972–1973)
- Roberts Robots (1973–1974)
- Truscott's Luck
- Rentaghost (1975–1984)
- Grandad (1979–1984)
- Galloping Galaxies! (1985–1986)

=== Music hall ===
- Kindly Leave the Stage (1968)
