= Michael Sheard =

Scottish actor (1938–2005)

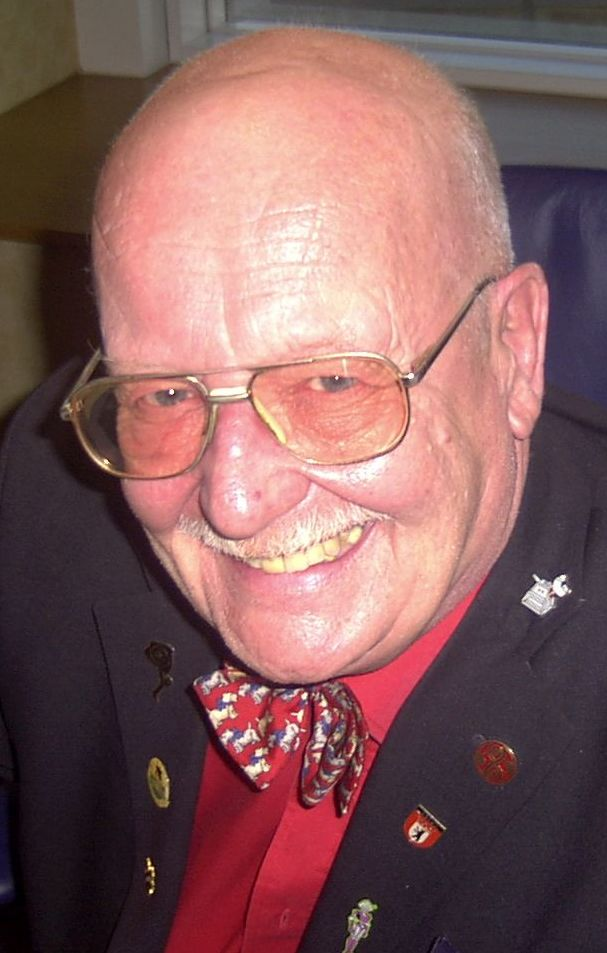
- Sheard in 2003
- Born: Michael Lawson Perkins; 18 June 1938; Aberdeen, Scotland
- Died: 31 August 2005 (aged 67); Isle of Wight, England
- Occupation: Actor
- Years active: 1962-2005
- Spouse: Rosalind Moir (m. 1961)
- Children: 3

Michael Sheard (born Michael Lawson Perkins; 18 June 1938 – 31 August 2005) was a Scottish actor who featured in many films and television programmes, and was best known for playing villains. His most prominent television role was as strict deputy headmaster Maurice Bronson in the children's series Grange Hill, which he played between 1985 and 1989. He appeared as Admiral Ozzel in The Empire Strikes Back (1980).

== Early life ==
Sheard was born in Aberdeen, Scotland, the son of Donald Marriot Perkins, a church minister. He was educated at Aberdeen Grammar School. He trained at the Royal Academy of Dramatic Art in London and took his mother's maiden name as his stage name. Sheard carried out his national service in the Royal Air Force.

== Career ==
In 1960, Sheard acted at the Perth Repertory Theatre in Scotland, where he was roommates with Donald Sutherland.

Sheard had a lengthy affiliation with science fiction, and appeared in six televised stories of the BBC science fiction television series Doctor Who, appearing with the First Doctor in The Ark (1966), the Third Doctor in The Mind of Evil (1971), the Fourth Doctor in Pyramids of Mars (1975) (for which he later recorded a DVD commentary) and The Invisible Enemy (1977), the Fifth Doctor in Castrovalva (1982), and the Seventh Doctor in Remembrance of the Daleks (1988). He also worked with the Eighth Doctor in The Stones of Venice, a Doctor Who audio drama produced by Big Finish Productions. He was a regular guest at both Doctor Who and Star Wars conventions over the years in the US and the UK.

Further to this, Sheard had guest roles in Colditz (1972), On the Buses (1973), Cloud Burst (1974), Space: 1999, the BBC's adaptation of the Lord Peter Wimsey story The Five Red Herrings (1975), The Sweeney (1975) and as Dr. Arnold Anderson in Crown Court (1976).

In 1978, Sheard appeared in one episode ("Sleeping Partners", as the character Adderley) of the television series All Creatures Great and Small. Also in 1978 Sheard appeared as Merton, a forensics expert in an episode of the hard-hitting British police drama The Professionals, the episode entitled "When the Heat Cools Off".

In 1980, Sheard appeared as Federation officer Klegg in "Powerplay" in episode 2 of series 3 of Blake's 7. Sheard also featured as Andrew McKinley, father of the eponymous heroine of the series Maggie between 1981 and 1982. In 1983, he played Herr Grunwald, the German manager of a building site, in the first series of Auf Wiedersehen, Pet.

Sheard portrayed Adolf Hitler five times in his career: in Rogue Male (1976), The Tomorrow People (1978), The Dirty Dozen: Next Mission (1985), Indiana Jones and the Last Crusade (1989) and the documentary Secret History: Hitler of the Andes (2003). He also portrayed Heinrich Himmler three times, in The Death of Adolf Hitler (1973), The Bunker (1981) and Space (1985). Although Sheard never played Hermann Göring, he did play Göring's double in the 'Allo 'Allo! episode "Hitler's Last Heil".

In 1980, Sheard had a supporting role in Stephen Poliakoff's BBC television play Caught on a Train.

Sheard appeared as Imperial officer Admiral Ozzel in The Empire Strikes Back (1980), where George Lucas cited Ozzel's death by the force-choke stare by Darth Vader as his favourite movie death scene. Lucas told Sheard at the time that it was "the best screen death I've ever seen". Although Sheard initially regarded Star Wars as "just another part in a very busy actor's career", the role gained him wide recognition among fans and he appeared frequently at Star Wars conventions while an Admiral Ozzel action figure was released.

In February 2005, Sheard played a small cameo role as the narrator in the British Star Wars fan film Order of the Sith: Vengeance and its sequel Downfall - Order of the Sith, alongside Jeremy Bulloch and David Prowse. These British fan films were made in support of Save the Children.

== Personal life ==
Sheard died of cancer on 31 August 2005, aged 67, at his home on the Isle of Wight, leaving his wife, Rosalind Moir, whom he married in 1961, they had two sons and a daughter.

== Filmography ==
- The McKenzie Break (1970) as Ingenieur-Offizier Unger
- Universal Soldier (1971) as Man (uncredited)
- Frenzy (1972) as Jim (uncredited)
- The Darwin Adventure (1972) as Man #1
- Super Bitch (1973) as Williamson (uncredited)
- England Made Me (1973) as Fromm
- Holiday on the Buses (1973) as Depot Manager
- Soft Beds, Hard Battles (1974) as New Military Governor (uncredited)
- The Hiding Place (1975) as Kapteyn
- Erotic Inferno (1975) as Eric Gold
- Rogue Male (BBC Film) (1976) as Adolf Hitler
- Force 10 from Navarone (1978) as Sgt. Bauer
- Escape to Athena (1979) as Sergeant Mann
- The Riddle of the Sands (1979) as Böehme
- All Quiet on the Western Front (1979) as Paul's father
- The Empire Strikes Back (1980) as Admiral Ozzel
- Rough Cut (1980) as Man at Airport (uncredited)
- Green Ice (1981) as Jaap
- The Bunker (1981) as Himmler
- Raiders of the Lost Ark (1981) as U-boat Captain (uncredited)
- High Road to China (1983) as Charlie
- The Dirty Dozen: Next Mission (1985, TV film) as Adolf Hitler
- Murder Rap (1988) as Defense Counsel (uncredited)
- Indiana Jones and the Last Crusade (1989) as Adolf Hitler (uncredited)
- Doombeach (1989) as Headmaster
- Another Life (2001) as Mr. Justice Shearman

== Bibliography ==
- Yes, Mr Bronson: Memoirs of a Bum Actor (ISBN 1-84024-007-5) published in 1997
- Yes, Admiral (ISBN 1-84024-103-9) published in 1999
- Yes, School's Out! (ISBN 90-76953-42-2) published in 2001
- Yes, It's Photographic! published in 2004
