= Rentaghost =

British children's TV comedy series (1976–1984)

- The Rentaghost title card, as it appeared in the first episode.
- Genre: Children's comedy
- Created by: Bob Block
- Written by: Bob Block
- Starring: Anthony Jackson; Michael Darbyshire; Michael Staniforth; Edward Brayshaw; Ann Emery; Molly Weir; Sue Nicholls
- Country of origin: United Kingdom
- Original language: English
- No. of series: 9
- No. of episodes: 58 (list of episodes)

Production
- Producers: Jeremy Swan, Paul Ciani
- Production company: BBC

Original release
- Network: BBC1
- Release: 6 January 1976 – 6 November 1984

Rentaghost is a British children's television comedy show, originally broadcast by the BBC between 6 January 1976 and 6 November 1984. The show's plot centred on the antics of a number of ghosts who worked for a firm called Rentaghost, which hired out the spirits for various tasks.

== Background ==
The firm, located in South Ealing, is originally run by Fred Mumford, a recently deceased loser who feels he can find work for ghosts whose lives were as unsuccessful as his. His first (and only) recruits are Timothy Claypole, a mischievous medieval jester with a comical lack of knowledge about modern technology, and Hubert Davenport, a delicate Victorian-era gentleman who is morally shocked by the modern world. The ghosts work from an office, which they rent from Harold Meaker, who discovers the truth about them in the third episode.

Over the course of several series, other characters were added: Hazel McWitch, a Scottish witch; Nadia Popov, a Dutch ghost who has hay fever and teleports away when she sneezes; and the pantomime horse Dobbin, who first appears in a one-off Christmas special called Rentasanta and is brought to life by Claypole, who is unable to cancel the spell afterwards, thus allowing Dobbin to remain in the show for the rest of the run.

Another key figure is a ghost from the Wild West called Catastrophe Kate (cf. Calamity Jane), played by Jana Shelden, who is collected from outside a magic carpet shop in the Spirit World by Fred Mumford. The two ghosts are transported back to Earth on a flying broomstick, Catastrophe Kate having turned down the alternative of a flying vacuum cleaner. Catastrophe Kate later introduces Hazel McWitch to the regulars.

Adam Painting, a local entrepreneur played by Christopher Biggins, frequently appears in episodes, and tries, with limited success, to involve the ghosts in his latest business enterprise.

Michael Darbyshire (who played the role of Davenport) died in 1979 and Anthony Jackson (Mumford) declined to appear in the fifth series, due to typecasting concerns. This left Michael Staniforth's Timothy Claypole as the sole original ghost. Davenport and Mumford's absences were explained at the start of the series by the pair having gone on an extended tour of safari parks (which provided set-up for a joke about "big game haunting"). After Mumford's departure, the business was taken over by Harold Meaker and his wife Ethel, who suffered from the various problems the ghosts brought to their lives.

The long-suffering neighbours of Rentaghost are the Perkins, who appear from series four onwards and think the Meakers are mad.

== Releases ==
Only the first series of Rentaghost was released on VHS and DVD, other episodes were not released due to poor sales. However, the first two series were made available digitally via the BBC Store.

Some master copies of Rentaghost episodes and other children's shows were wiped by the BBC in 1993 on the assumption that they were no use and that examples of some other episodes were sufficient. The wiped tapes were then sold overseas to countries that still used obsolete, in the UK at least, tape formats. However, BBC Enterprises had requested copies of the first three series a couple of years earlier and they were showing at the time on UK Gold; these were later recovered by the BBC Archives.

Since November 2023, all 9 series (minus the Christmas special) were made available through the UK BritBox service as part of their "Back To School" section. Britbox is a subscription online TV service run by ITV.

== Cast ==
- Anthony Jackson as Fred Mumford (1976–1978)
- Michael Darbyshire as Hubert Davenport (1976–1978)
- Michael Staniforth as Timothy Claypole (1976–1984)
- Betty Alberge as Mrs Sheila Mumford (1976–1978)
- John Dawson as Mr Phil Mumford (1976–1978)
- Edward Brayshaw as Harold Meaker (1976–1984)
- Ann Emery as Ethel Meaker (1976–1984)
- Christopher Biggins as Adam Painting (1977–1984)
- Molly Weir as Hazel the McWitch (1978–1984)
- Hal Dyer as Rose Perkins (1978–1984)
- Jeffrey Segal as Arthur Perkins (1978–1984)
- William Perrie and John Asquith as Dobbin the Pantomime Horse (1978–1984)
- Lynda Marchal as Tamara Novek (1980)
- Sue Nicholls as Nadia Popov (1981–1984)
- Kenneth Connor as Whatsisname Smith (1983–1984)
- Aimi MacDonald as Susie Starlight (1984)
- Vincent White as Bernie St. John (1984)

== Reception ==
Martin Belam of The Guardian said that although the show is weird, flawed, and bleak — it's surprisingly good.

The Folk Horror Revival: Field Studies - Second Edition said that the series was "never the strongest British supernatural show", noting that it "became repetitive" and "lasted longer than was best for it". They also said that The Ghosts of Motley Hall, is a better ghost show.

== Remakes ==
A pilot for an Australian version of the series was filmed in 1989, five years after the end of the original series, and in keeping with other BBC series such as Are You Being Served? which had been adapted for Australian versions. The producers had originally wanted Michael Staniforth to reprise his role as Mister Claypole, the unofficial 'lead' of the original series, but Staniforth had died two years prior.

The pilot, which followed a similar plot to the first two episodes of the original Rentaghost but with some of the more pantomime-like humour of later years, was set in a derelict old office in Victoria due for destruction, where the Rentaghost team had set up their business, beginning a planned story arc for the first series in which the Rentaghost team must scare off building developers to save their office/home. A young Lisa McCune played Julia, a character who visits the agency mistakenly believing them to be living people who can exorcise her haunted apartment, and ends up working as their secretary after they help her chase her poltergeist away anyway. However the pilot did not sell, with some concerns over appropriateness of the dark tone of the series aimed at young children, and plans for the series were cancelled.

A stage musical version (written by Joe Pasquale), toured the UK in 2006.

In September 2008, it was reported that the show could be returning to television after the rights to the programme were obtained by the UK production company RDF. However, no new show was forthcoming.

Deadline reported in December 2010 that "Warner Bros had acquired the rights to RentaGhost and was going to develop it into a Beetlejuice-style afterlife feature comedy vehicle for Russell Brand as Fred Mumford." However, in October 2011, it was reported that Ben Stiller had been signed for the project. Night at the Museum writers Tom Lennon and Robert Ben Garant had been hired to write the script, reuniting the two writers with Stiller.

== See also ==
- List of ghost films
