= Jill Allgood =

Jill Allgood (15 November 1910 – 1995) was a British producer, director, script writer, author and broadcaster who worked for the BBC.

Allgood was a personal friend of Bebe Daniels and Ben Lyon, and worked with them professionally. In 1944 she was working for Cecil Madden, Head of BBC Overseas Entertainment, and from 1944 to 1946, with Howard Agg (and later with C. F. Meehan), she devised and produced a weekly/fortnightly programme for forces in hospitals called Here's Wishing You Well Again. There she got to know Bebe and Ben, who were often requested guests on that programme. She collaborated with Bebe on episodes of Life with the Lyons, and wrote their biography Bebe and Ben.

Between 1947 and 1949 Jill Allgood wrote documentary scripts for the BBC's Woman's Hour, followed by work as editor, presenter and producer of children's radio programmes. In 1960 she created nine episodes of Four Feather Falls, a TV show produced by Gerry Anderson for Granada Television.

== Radio ==
| Year | Title | Role | Notes |
|---|---|---|---|
| 1944 to 1946 | Here’s Wishing You Well Again | Producer | |
| 1947 to 1949 | Woman’s Hour | Script | |
| 1947 | Follow the Sun | Script | |
| 1948 | Woman’s Hour: Visiting a Lightship | Script | |
| 1949 | Harry Hemsley in Hemsley’s Hotel | Script | |
| 1950 | For the Children: Telescope | Editor | |
| 1950 | For the Children: Children’s Newsreel: Roman City | Presenter | |
| 1950 | For the Children: Children’s Newsreel | Presenter & Script | |
| 1950 | The Adventures of Butterball | Editor | |
| 1951 | For the Children: Puppet Party | Producer | |
| 1951 | For the Children: The Final Edition of Telescope | Producer & Editor | |
| 1951 | For the Children: Children’s Art | Producer | |
| 1962 | Sunday Story: St. Francis of Assisi 1. A Wealthy Young Man | Writer | |
| 1962 | Sunday Story: St. Francis of Assisi 2. The Builder | Writer | |
| 1962 | Sunday Story: Tales from Tolstoy | Writer | |
| 1963 | Sunday Story: St. Francis of Assisi 3. The Rule and the Order | Writer | |
| 1963 | Sunday Story: St. Francis of Assisi 4. Love and Courage | Writer | |
| 1963 | Sunday Story: St. Francis of Assisi 5. The Last Song | Writer | |

== Television ==
| Year | Title | Role | Notes |
|---|---|---|---|
| 1960 | Four Feather Falls | Screenplay | 9 episodes |

== Filmography ==
| Year | Film | Role | Notes | | |
| Year | Film | Role | Notes | Director | Writer |
|---|---|---|---|---|---|
| 1959 | The Adventures of Timothy Telescope | No | No | Yes | No |

== Bibliography ==
- Allgood, Jill (1951). Timothy Telescope, Cactus the Camel & Valerie Hobson in Ship Ahoy!. Wells Gardner, Darton & Co., Ltd.
- Allgood, Jill (1975). Bebe and Ben. Robert Hale & Co. ISBN 0-709-14942-5.
- Daniels, Bebe; Allgood, Jill (1950). 282 ways of making a salad with favorite recipes by British and American personalities and stars. Cassell & Co. OCLC 13066530.
