= Life with the Lyons (film) =

1954 film

- Directed by: Val Guest
- Written by: Robert Dunbar; Val Guest
- Based on: Life with the Lyons by Bebe Daniels; Bob Block; Bill Harding
- Produced by: Robert Dunbar
- Starring: Ben Lyon; Bebe Daniels; Barbara Lyon; Richard Lyon
- Cinematography: Walter J. Harvey; Len Harris
- Edited by: Douglas Myers
- Music by: Arthur Wilkinson; Jack Beaver
- Production company: Hammer Film Productions
- Distributed by: Exclusive Films; Lippert Pictures (US)
- Release date: 25 May 1954
- Running time: 81 minutes (UK); 78 minutes (US)
- Country: United Kingdom
- Language: English
- Budget: £28,000
- Box office: Over £70,000

Life with the Lyons (also known as Family Affair) is a 1954 British comedy film directed by Val Guest for Hammer Films and starring Bebe Daniels, Ben Lyon and Barbara Lyon. It was a spin-off from the extremely popular British radio series Life with the Lyons, and the screenplay, by Guest and Robert Dunbar, was based on previous episodes from the show. It was shot at Southall Studios in London with sets designed by the art director Wilfred Arnold. This was Val Guest's first film for Hammer, and he was asked personally to be involved with the film by Ben Lyon himself. Filming began on Sept. 7, 1953, and it was trade shown at Studio One on Jan. 5, 1954. The film was so successful, it resulted in the Lyons getting a new TV series in 1954, and clips from the movie were shown in the first episode. The film played in over two thousand theatres in England, and was Hammer's biggest hit up to this point in their existence.

== Premise ==
The Lyon family attempts to move to a new West End house. The problem is the landlord Mr. Hemmingway regards the family as annoying and disruptive. Although the Lyons have moved into the house, the lease has not yet been signed, and whenever the landlord stops by to finalize the contract, something chaotic happens that makes him change his mind. The Lyons concoct a plan wherein they can control themselves long enough to permit Mr. Hemmingway to sign the lease.

== Cast ==
- Bebe Daniels as Bebe Lyon
- Ben Lyon as Ben Lyon
- Richard Lyon as Richard Lyon
- Barbara Lyon as Barbara Lyon
- Hugh Morton as Mr. Hemingway
- Horace Percival as Mr. Wimple
- Molly Weir as Aggie
- Doris Rogers as Florrie Wainwright
- Gwen Lewis as Mrs. Wimple
- Arthur Hill as Slim Cassidy
- Belinda Lee as Violet Hemingway

== Production ==
The Lyons' contract called for them to receive a percentage of the film's profits, since they did the film for only half their regular pay rate.

Val Guest had worked with the Lyons writing stage revues and says he got the job directing this film by walking past Ben Lyon in the street. Lyon told Guest that Hammer wanted to make a film of Life with the Lyons and asked Guest to direct. Guest went into meet James Carreras who "Said to me 'I don't know anything about comedy. I'm no good with comedy so I'll leave it to you.' I said 'Well you don't have to leave it to me, the three people you've got, Bebe [Daniels], Ben [Lyon] and Vic Oliver know more about comedy than I'll ever know.' So that's why they lurched into comedy. They'd never done ....comedy."

"Bebe was the driving force of that team," recalled Guest. "She was a very clever business woman, she drove that whole family, she drove the machine, she wrote the scripts – I'm talking about the radio thing, the TV things. She had files and files she'd brought from Hollywood, of old programmes she'd bought the scripts from – I'd never seen such a file of gags and routines... She was the driving force, very stimulating lady. Eventually I think she drove so much it eventually gave her the heart attack – she had a stroke. Because she was always very tense. Great sense of fun, very professional... Ben had a terrifying temper. He had the shortest fuse of anybody I knew.....We had a lot of fun. There were no problems except if Ben lost his temper about something."

It was the second time Belinda Lee worked for Val Guest, the first being her debut in The Runaway Bus.

=== Box office ===
After the film's successful release, the Lyons began a long-running, BBC television series, also titled Life with the Lyons. The film was made at Southall Studios.

The film was followed in 1955 by a sequel The Lyons in Paris. Guest said the film and its sequel were popular but "I shouldn't have thought they did much [business] abroad. They were curiosity pieces, very cheap to make and quick to make and we had a lot of fun making them." The problem was that the Lyons radio program was really only super popular in England.

=== Critical ===
The Monthly Film Bulletin wrote: "The script is compounded of the same well-worn jokes and situations, but has moments of authentic fun and keeps up a commendable pace. The Lyon family have considerable charm, and seem to enjoy it all. On the whole, a pleasant and unpretentious film."

Picture Show wrote: "This is a gay, carefree farce based on the radio show with which the Ben Lyon family have won thousands of admirers. ... Amusing entertainment,"

Picturegoer wrote: "No sentiment, no tears, just high-speed domestic pandemonium, beating the laughs out of one gag and hurrying on to the next. ... Bebe, Ben, Richard and Barbara have what it takes, plus the ability to project warm personalities. Val Guest's expert direction does the rest. There's real teamwork and an absence of that self-conscious, arch humour found in many British tea-time farces. For light family entertainment, this is the life."

The Radio Times Guide to Films gave the film 2/5 stars, writing: "Based on the second long-running radio show made in Britain by the American stars Ben Lyon and Bebe Daniels (after Hi Gang! in 1941), this is a lightweight domestic comedy whose cosy appeal has been attenuated by the passage of time. Their playing looks laboured, and the marshmallow script about a reluctant landlord doesn't help the cause."

In British Sound Films: The Studio Years 1928–1959 David Quinlan rated the film as "good", writing: "Domestic pandemonium at the double, from the hit radio series; laughs all the way."

Britmovie called it "a cheap but cheerful romp."
