= Hugh Morton (actor) =

English actor (1903–1984)

Hugh Morton in The Avengers episode Esprit de Corps (1964)

Hugh Morton (28 June 1903 – 11 July 1984) was an English actor, best known for his work on BBC Radio for which he made more than 3,000 broadcasts, beginning in the 1920s. His career spanned more than sixty years and also included theatre, cinema and television.

== Life and career ==
Morton was born in Ivybridge, Devon, the son of a naval officer. The family was from the upper classes; its members included Morton's first cousin, Anthony Eden, who became British prime minister in the 1950s. Morton was educated at Haileybury and Queens' College, Cambridge, studied at the Royal Academy of Dramatic Art, and secured his first professional engagement in a touring company run by Violet and Irene Vanbrugh.

According to Morton's obituary in The Times, his cinema career began in the days of silent films. He was frequently cast in supporting roles as judges, bank managers or butlers. On stage he took over the role of Captain Hook in Peter Pan from Alastair Sim and appeared with Arthur Askey in a long-running comedy, The Love Racket. On radio he was the first actor to play the title role in the long-running Paul Temple series, and a regular member of the team of It's That Man Again, Life with the Lyons and Hancock's Half Hour. In these and other programmes he made more than 3,000 broadcasts. Character roles on television included the Bishop in the 1978 Wodehouse Playhouse episode 'The Smile that Wins'.

Morton married the broadcaster Monica Strachey in 1938. He died in London at the age of 81.

== Filmography ==
Year	Title	Role	Notes
1943	Deadlock	Arkell	
1946	Gaiety George	King (on stage)	Uncredited
1949	Golden Arrow	Perdrelli	
1950	Portrait of Clare	Ernest Mayhew	
1951	Mr. Denning Drives North	Inspector Snell	
1952	The Floating Dutchman	Inspector Cathie	
1953	Decameron Nights	King	
1954	The Diamond	Mr. Pritchard	Uncredited
1954	Life with the Lyons	Mr. Hemingway	
1954	Dangerous Voyage	Inquiry Chairman	
1955	The Lyons in Paris	Col. Price	
1955	Where There's a Will	Lawyer Arscott	
1955	Man of the Moment	Mitchell	
1956	Lost	Doctor Fairfax	Uncredited
1956	Guilty? a.k.a. Je plaide non coupable	Rumbold Senior	
1956	The Big Money	Valet	
1957	Rogue's Yarn	Doctor	
1958	Bachelor of Hearts	Lecturer	
1961	Payroll	Mr. John	
1961	Three on a Spree	Grant	
1963	Master Spy	Sir Gilbert Saunders	
1964	The Masque of the Red Death		Uncredited
1967	Quatermass and the Pit	Elderly Journalist	
1972	The Darwin Adventure	Josiah Wedgewood	
1975	Section spéciale	L'amiral William Leahy, l'ambassadeur des États-Unis	
1978	The Stud	Staton	Uncredited
1981	Lady Killers	Mr. Justice Shearman	
1984	Oxford Blues	Stanley the Butler	
