= The Human Side =

1934 film by Edward Buzzell

- Directed by: Edward Buzzell
- Screenplay by: Edward Buzzell; Frank Craven; Ernest Pascal
- Produced by: E.M. Asher
- Starring: Adolphe Menjou; Doris Kenyon; Charlotte Henry; Reginald Owen; Joseph Cawthorn; Betty Lawford
- Cinematography: Norbert Brodine
- Edited by: Maurice Wright
- Production company: Universal Pictures
- Distributed by: Universal Pictures
- Release date: September 1, 1934
- Running time: 70 minutes
- Country: United States
- Language: English

The Human Side is a 1934 American drama film directed by Edward Buzzell and written by Edward Buzzell, Frank Craven and Ernest Pascal. The film stars Adolphe Menjou, Doris Kenyon, Charlotte Henry, Reginald Owen, Joseph Cawthorn and Betty Lawford. The film was released on September 1, 1934, by Universal Pictures.

== Cast ==
- Adolphe Menjou as Gregory Sheldon
- Doris Kenyon as Vera Sheldon
- Charlotte Henry as Lucille Sheldon
- Reginald Owen as James Dalton
- Joseph Cawthorn as Fritz Speigal
- Betty Lawford as Alma Hastings
- Dickie Moore as Bobbie Sheldon
- George Ernest as Tom Sheldon
- Dick Winslow as Phil Sheldon
