= Hi Gang! =

Hi Gang! may refer to:

- Hi Gang! (radio series), a British radio series of the 1940s
- Hi Gang! (film), a 1941 film version
