= Alias French Gertie =

1930 film by George Archainbaud

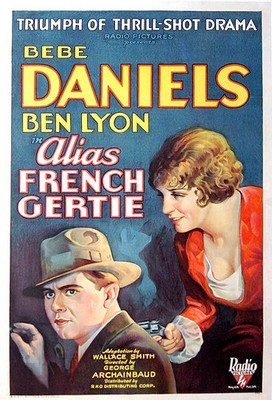
- Theatrical release poster
- Directed by: George Archainbaud
- Screenplay by: Wallace Smith
- Based on: The Chatterbox by Bayard Veiller
- Produced by: Henry Hobart
- Starring: Bebe Daniels; Ben Lyon
- Cinematography: J. Roy Hunt
- Production company: RKO Radio Pictures
- Distributed by: RKO Radio Pictures
- Release date: April 11, 1930 (United States)
- Running time: 66 minutes
- Country: United States
- Language: English

Alias French Gertie is a 1930 American pre-Code crime film directed by George Archainbaud from a screenplay by Wallace Smith, based upon the unproduced play The Chatterbox by Bayard Veiller. The film stars Bebe Daniels and Ben Lyon, who were making their first on-screen appearance together. A copy of this film survives in the Library of Congress.

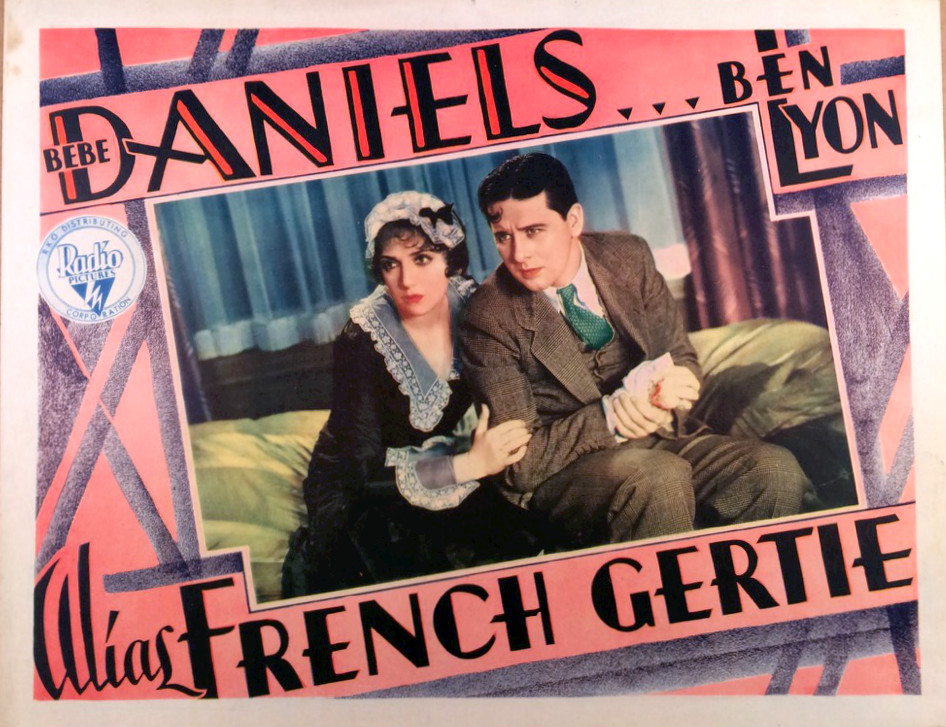
Lobby card

== Plot ==
French Gertie is a jewel thief posing as French maid named Marie, and she plans to rob the safe of her employer. However, on the night of the robbery, a thief named Jimmy appears, also intending to empty the safe. Jimmy opens the safe and the two agree to divide the contents evenly. However, when the police arrive, Jimmy hides Gertie and is arrested, later admitting to perpetrating the crime alone.

After serving a year-long prison sentence, Jimmy is reunited with Gertie, and they form a crime partnership. After several bank robberies, Marie and Jimmy agree that after one last haul, they will turn straight. Marie, along with her friends and neighbors Mr. and Mrs. Matson, persuade Jimmy to invest his $30,000 savings in Matson's business. However, the Matsons are also crooks who have stolen Jimmy's life's savings.

After Jimmy determines to return to safecracking, planning to begin with Marie's former employers, Marie hatches a plot to encourage him to turn straight. When Detective Kelcey agrees to allow them to remain free if they will turn straight, they agree.

== Cast ==
- Bebe Daniels as Marie
- Ben Lyon as Jimmy
- Robert Emmett O'Connor as Kelcey
- John Ince as Mr. Matson
- Daisy Belmore as Mrs. Matson
- Betty Pierce as Nellie
- Nella Walker as Morton's Wife

== Production ==
Alias French Gertie is the first film to feature both Daniels and Lyon. They were married a short time later in June 1930, and they remained married until Daniels' death in 1971.

The film was a remake of the 1925 FBO silent film Smooth as Satin, starring Evelyn Brent and Bruce Gordon and directed by Ralph Ince.

== Reception ==
In a contemporary review for The New York Times, critic Mordaunt Hall wrote: "[T]his film has not been handled with the subtlety and smoothness it deserves. Nevertheless, up to a certain point, it is a production that holds the interest, but what should have been the main idea is sacrificed for a more obvious turn of events. ... This might have been a more engrossing piece of work had the climax been kept to the uncovering of the evil doings of the Matsons, instead of carrying on the story to another attempt at stealing."
