= Lavinia Derwent =

Scottish author and broadcaster

Lavinia Derwent MBE
- Born: Elizabeth Dodd; 1909; Cheviot Hills, Scotland
- Died: 1989 (aged 79–80)
- Occupations: Writer and broadcaster
- Writing career
- Pen name: Lavinia Derwent
- Genres: Children's fiction, adult fiction
- Notable work: The Sula quartet

Elizabeth Dodd MBE (1909–1989), better known by her pen name Lavinia Derwent, was a Scottish author and broadcaster.

== Life ==
Derwent was born in an isolated farmhouse in the Cheviot Hills, seven miles from Jedburgh and began making up stories about animals at an early age. She wrote a version of Greyfriars Bobby. Her autobiographical books include her Border and Manse series. Border Bairn is set around Jedburgh, while Lady of the Manse has a Berwickshire setting. Derwent's Manse books drew on her experiences keeping house for her Church of Scotland minister brother.

== Broadcasting ==
Derwent's first successes were her Tammy Troot stories, which were read out in the 1920s on Auntie Kathleen's Children's Hour on Scottish Radio. The first of the books was published in 1947. They were still being reprinted in the 1970s, when Derwent, alternating with Molly Weir and Cliff Hanley, co-presented the series Teatime Tales on the STV (TV network), recalling stories taken from her own childhood.

== The Sula books ==
Derwent books about a fictional island called Sula later featured in BBC's Jackanory, read by John Cairney. These were also made into a television series.

The original novels were: Sula, Return to Sula, The Boy From Sula and Song of Sula.

== Bibliography ==
- ”My Own Book of Birds” (1937)
- Tammy Troot (1947)
- Tammy Troot's Capers (1947)
- Huffy Puffy the little red engine (1951)
- Macpherson (1961)
- Further Adventures of Tammy Troot (1975)
- Sula (1969)
- Return to Sula (1971)
- The Boy from Sula (1973)
- Song of Sula (1976)
- Macpherson's Island (1970)
- Macpherson's Skyscraper (1978)
- A Breath of Border Air (1977)
- Another Breath of Border Air (1978)
- God Bless the Borders (1981)
- A Border Bairn (1980)
- Beyond the Borders (1989)
- The Tale of Greyfriars Bobby (1985)
- The Lady of the Manse (1985)
- A Mouse in the Manse (1987)
