= Grace Perkins =

American screenwriter

- Born: Grace Margaret Perkins; August 20, 1900; Boston, Massachusetts, U.S.
- Died: December 16, 1955 (aged 55); New York City, New York, U.S.
- Other names: Dora Macy
- Occupation(s): Screenwriter, novelist, actress
- Spouse: Fulton Oursler
- Children: 2

Grace Margaret Perkins (August 20, 1900 – December 16, 1955), sometimes credited as Dora Macy, was an American screenwriter, actress, and novelist active during the 1920s through the 1950s.

== Early life ==
Perkins's father was publisher James Lamont Perkins. She was the sister of musician Ray Perkins and actress Bobbie Perkins. Born in Boston, Perkins grew up in New York City and Westchester. She attended a Sacred Heart Catholic girls' school in Manhattan and, for one year, a boarding school. Her studies at Columbia University's School of Journalism ended with her father's death during her sophomore year.

== Career ==
After Perkins left Columbia, she studied stenography and worked with a magazine until Minnie Dupree encouraged her to try acting after they had worked together on entertainment for soldiers. Leaving the magazine, she went to Toronto, where she acted in a stock theater company, after which she performed in Rochester. Eventually, she left acting and became a newspaper reporter. Her first assignment, interviewing a woman whose husband had been murdered, turned her from covering hard news to writing book reviews and bedtime stories. Apart from that work for the newspaper, she wrote songs for children and serials and short stories for magazines.

On Broadway, Perkins portrayed Rosalie in The Lullaby (1923) and Miss Larrier in Her Way Out (1924).

She wrote the magazine article No More Orchids, which was the basis for the 1932 film of the same title. She and Oursler wrote the play The Walking Gentleman (1942).

Perkins was executive editor of a monthly magazine, Guideposts, in Carmel, N.Y.

== Dora Macy ==
Dora Macy occurs as a character name in fiction, including Perkins'.

== Personal life ==
Perkins was the second wife of writer Fulton Oursler, with whom she had two children. On his death, Oursler left his estate to Perkins on the understanding that she would leave the estate to his four children. When she died, she only left it to the two children she had with Oursler. Oursler's elder two children successfully sued for their share.

She died in New York City in 1955, aged 55.

== Selected works ==
- Air Hostess 1919
- Mike 1933
- Personal Maid. Covici-Friede. 1931.
- Ex-Mistress
- Night Nurse
- Promiscuous
- Public Sweetheart No. 1
- Riding High
- No More Orchids
- The Unbreakable Mrs Doll
- Modern Lady
- Twilight Cheats
- Crazy Kid

== Selected filmography ==
- Three on a Honeymoon (1934)
- Social Register (1934)
- Torch Singer (1933)
- Air Hostess (1933) (uncredited)
- No More Orchids (1932)
- Personal Maid (1931)
- Night Nurse (1931)
- My Past (1931)
