= Sonia Karlov =

American actress

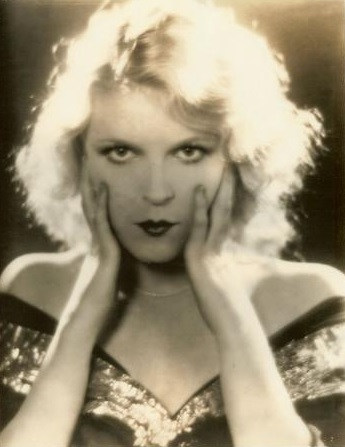
- Karlov, c. 1928
- Born: Alma Jeanne Williams; July 12, 1908; Syracuse, New York, U.S.
- Occupations: Actress; dancer
- Spouses: George Williams, 1926-? (div); Henry Clive, 1935-1941 (div)

Sonia Karlov (born July 12, 1908, date of death unknown) (Note: As of 2009, Doris Eaton Travis is the last surviving Ziegfeld girl: "At 105, Doris Eaton Travis, the Last Ziegfeld Girl, Keeps a Hectic Pace") was an American dancer, stage, and motion picture actress from Syracuse, New York. Her birth name was Alma Jeanne Williams.

== Early years ==
Alma Jeanne Williams was born on July 12, 1908, in Syracuse, New York. Williams was selected as Miss Syracuse of 1924 and went on to participate in that year's Miss America contest. She was sixteen years of age. Afterward she moved to New York City along with her sister Mary. Ned Wayburn signed her to perform in the Ziegfeld Follies of Flo Ziegfeld.

== Deceived film executives ==
Karlov moved to Hollywood as a 19-year-old but left without a movie contract, her only film work having been appearing as an extra in one production and performing "a perilous high-dive" in another. Then she was in an auto accident and lay in a hospital bed, disabled physically for six weeks. During this time she concocted a bold hoax which she intended to carry out. She also changed her hair color from brunette to blond. She returned to Hollywood using the name of Sonia Karlov, Norwegian actress. Supposedly she was the daughter of a Russian father and a Norwegian mother. Karlov hired a press agent after convincing him that she was a great foreign actress. Another version of how Jeanne became Sonia is that she began dating a press agent who came up with the entire deception. Later he got drunk and revealed everything. She feared being discovered by her friends and later told an interviewer, "The first glance friends would give me, terrified me."

Newspaper reporters flocked to her side for interviews and the daily papers were replete with stories about her. Then she was invited to a newspaper luncheon as a guest of honor. A New York reporter recognized her as Jeanne Williams of the Follies. The following morning she entered the office of Cecil B. Demille and confessed to him her ruse. Karlov pleaded with him to give her a trial and not tear up her contract. Demille replied that she had been deceptive enough to trick him, his staff, and all of Hollywood. He said that if she was just as proficient as an actress, she could appear in his motion pictures. She was signed to an MGM contract for five years.

== Movie and stage actress ==
Karlov's film career was a brief one. Her sole screen credit is in the role of Lulu Bellew in Lucky in Love (1929). She was released from her MGM contract but received some financial compensation. Charles R. Rogers, formerly an executive of RKO – Pathe Pictures, signed her to a term contract in July 1932. She found herself at a disadvantage in sound motion pictures because of her pronounced Russian accent. She had learned it too proficiently and was forced to return to Broadway, for work.

In October 1930, she played "Betty Gilbert", a chorus girl, in Sisters of the Chorus. The play came to the Ritz Theater in New York after a successful run in western American cities. The production co-starred Enid Markey and Edna Hibbard. She was a part of the cast of Love On Approval, which was staged at The Playhouse in Chicago, Illinois, in June 1932. Karlov turned to writing film scenarios, of which she had produced six by December 1934. Two of these were accepted and produced by MGM. Her sister, Jane, held a position at the Park Central Hotel in New York City in the 1930s. Mary Williams continued performing as a dancer in the Ziegfeld Follies, George White's Scandals, and the Grand Street Scandals.

== Personal life ==
In October 1926, Karlov married George Williams, the son of a Tennessee newspaper publisher. Later, she was married to Henry Clive, an artist whose work was used on the cover of The American Weekly magazine.
