= Ernest Lawford =

English stage and film actor

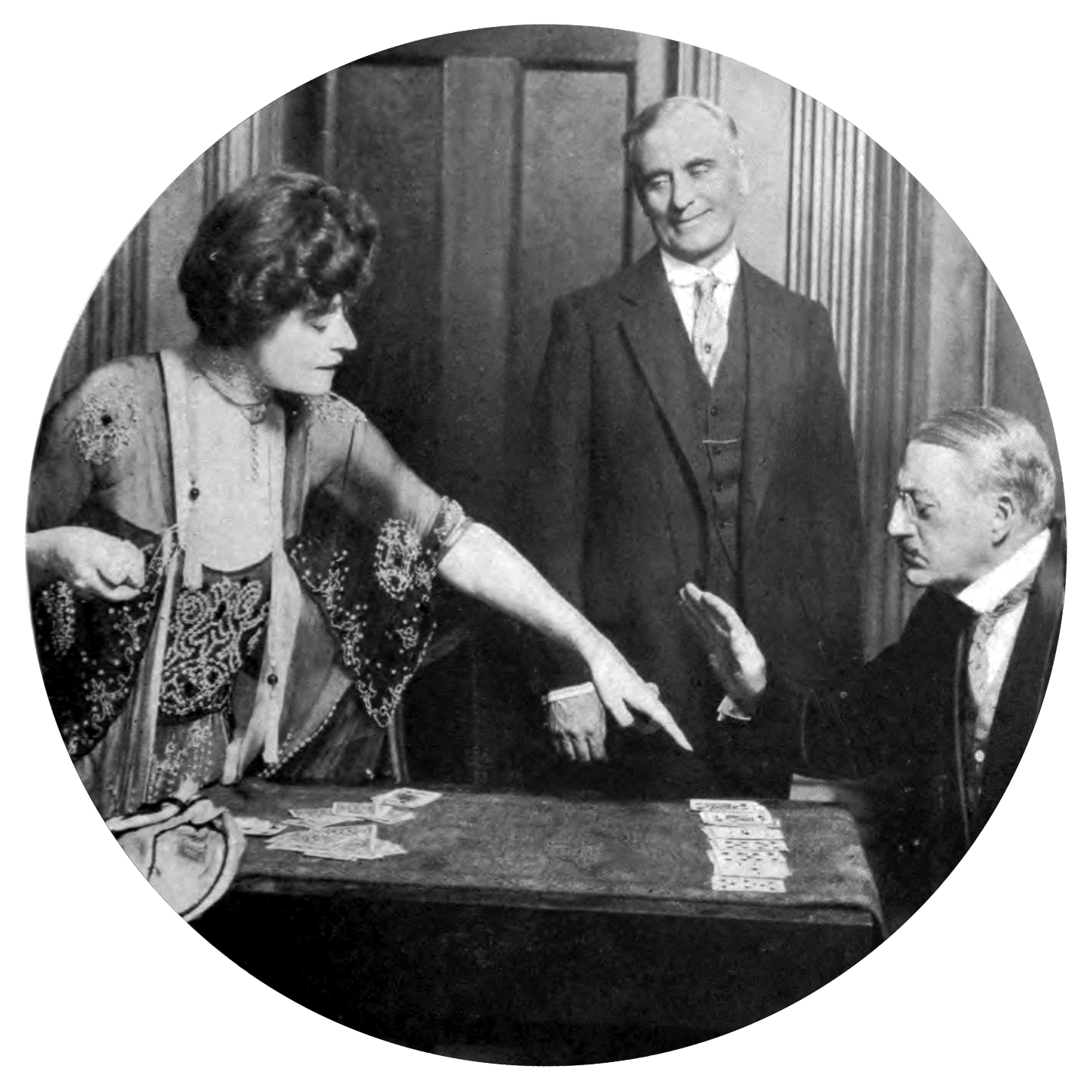
- The Circle, 1921 with Mrs. Leslie Carter, Ernest Lawford, and John Drew
- Born: April 20, 1870; Yorkshire, England
- Died: December 27, 1940 (aged 70); New York City, New York
- Occupation: Actor
- Years active: 1890-1940
- Spouse: Janet Slater
- Children: Betty Lawford
- Relatives: Peter Lawford (cousin)

Ernest E. Lawford (1870–1940) was an English stage and film actor.

== Biography ==
Lawford made his theatrical debut in 1890 in London at the St James's Theatre in As You Like It. Later he appeared in productions of Charley's Aunt and A Woman of No Importance. In 1894 appeared in several plays with Arnold Daly at the Drury Lane Theatre. He toured the provinces with George Alexander. He made his first appearance in New York in 1903 and appeared with Arnold Daly in Candida. He later signed with Charles Frohman and appeared as the first American Mr. Darling in Peter Pan with Maude Adams. He remained with Frohman in drawing room type plays. He appeared with Grace George in Major Barbara in 1915, The Circle in 1921 with John Drew and Mrs. Leslie Carter and a modern-dress version of Hamlet in 1925 with Basil Sydney. One of his last New York plays was Tovarich in 1936.

Although Lawford remained a stage actor for most of his career, he made his film debut in 1914 with Mary Pickford in A Good Little Devil. He made a slew of films up to his last, Personal Maid, in 1931, which was directed by Monta Bell. Monta Bell married Lawford's daughter, Betty, around the time of this film.

== Personal ==
Lawford proposed marriage to Ethel Barrymore early in her career. He was one of many men rumored engaged to the actress. He was later married to Janet Slater and had one child, Betty Lawford. Betty's first husband was Monta Bell, the director who made Ernest Lawford's final film in 1931. The actor Peter Lawford was a cousin. Ernest Lawford died in New York on December 27, 1940.

== Filmography ==
- A Good Little Devil (1914)
- The On-the-Square Girl (1917)
- The Fighter (1921)
- Irish Luck (1925)
- Personal Maid (1931)
