= Lucky in Love (film) =

1929 film

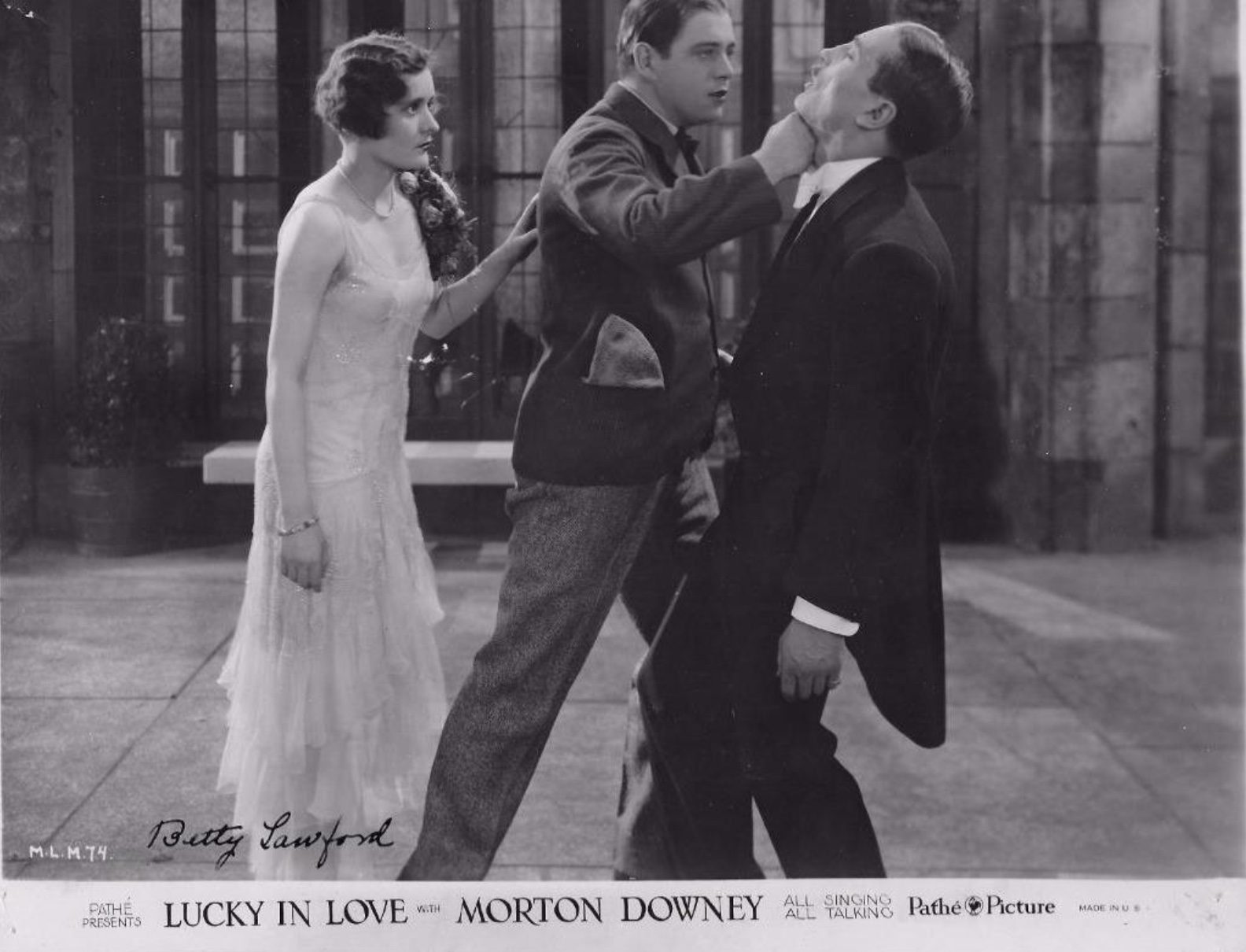
- Directed by: Kenneth Webb
- Written by: Gene Markey
- Produced by: Robert Kane
- Starring: Morton Downey; Betty Lawford; Colin Keith-Johnston
- Cinematography: Harry Stradling Sr. Philip Tannura
- Edited by: Edward Pfitzenmeier
- Music by: Yasha Bunchuk
- Production company: Pathé Exchange
- Distributed by: Pathé Exchange
- Release date: August 17, 1929
- Running time: 76 minutes
- Country: United States
- Language: English

Lucky in Love is a 1929 American musical comedy film directed by Kenneth Webb and starring Morton Downey, Betty Lawford and Colin Keith-Johnston. It was an early sound film, made during the transition from silent films.

== Synopsis ==
Michael O'More is an Irish American living in Ireland with his uncle, a horse trainer for the Earl of Balkerry, where he falls in love with the Earl's granddaughter. After nearly killing a rival for her love, the caddish Captain Brian Fitzroy, O'More flees to the United States. He enjoys success working for a department store tycoon and is offered a chance to go back to Balkerry and establish a linen mill.

== Cast ==
- Morton Downey as Michael O'More
- Betty Lawford as Lady Mary Cardigan
- Colin Keith-Johnston as Captain Brian Fitzroy
- Halliwell Hobbes as Earl of Balkerry
- J.M. Kerrigan as Connors
- Edward McNamara as Tim O'More
- Richard Taber as Paddy
- Edward O'Connor as Rafferty
- Mary Murray as Kate
- Mackenzie Ward as Cyril
- Louis Sorin as Abe Feinberg
- Sonia Karlov as Lulu Bellew
- Tyrell Davis as Potts
- Elizabeth Murray as Landlady

== Plot ==
The theme song for the film was entitled "Love Is A Dreamer" which was composed by Bud Green and Sam H. Stept. Also featured on the soundtrack were the songs "For The Likes O' You And Me" and "When They Sing The Wearing Of The Green (In Syncopated Blues)" which were also composed by Bud Green and Sam H. Stept.

== See also ==
- List of early sound feature films (1926–1929)

== Bibliography ==
- Munden, Kenneth White. The American Film Institute Catalog of Motion Pictures Produced in the United States, Part 1. University of California Press, 1997.
