= My Past =

1931 film

- Film poster
- Directed by: Roy Del Ruth
- Written by: Charles Kenyon
- Based on: Ex-Mistress; 1930 novel by Dora Macy
- Starring: Bebe Daniels
- Cinematography: Barney McGill
- Edited by: Ralph Dawson
- Music by: David Mendoza; Erno Rapee
- Production company: Warner Bros. Pictures
- Distributed by: Warner Bros. Pictures
- Release date: May 14, 1931
- Running time: 72–74 minutes
- Country: United States
- Language: English

My Past is a 1931 American Pre-Code drama film directed by Roy Del Ruth and starring Bebe Daniels. It was produced and distributed by Warner Bros. Pictures and was also known under the alternative title The Ex-Mistress.

== Plot ==
Broadway star Doree Macy is being simultaneously wooed by two men who happen to be business partners: older John Thornley and younger (and married) Robert Byrne. Which, if either, will wind up with her heart?

== Cast ==
- Bebe Daniels as Miss Doree Macy
- Lewis Stone as Mr. John Thornley
- Ben Lyon as Robert "Bob" Byrne
- Joan Blondell as Marion Moore
- Natalie Moorhead as Consuelo "Connie" Byrne
- Albert Gran as Lionel Reich
- Virginia Sale as Miss Taft, Thornley's secretary

== Preservation status ==
A surviving print is preserved in the collection of the Library of Congress. It is also available on DVD from Warner Archive and airs occasionally on Turner Classic Movies.
