= The Lyons in Paris =

1955 film by Val Guest

- Directed by: Val Guest
- Written by: Val Guest; Robert Dunbar
- Based on: the radio series by Bebe Daniels; Bob Block; Bill Harding
- Produced by: Robert Dunbar
- Starring: Ben Lyon; Bebe Daniels; Barbara Lyon; Richard Lyon
- Cinematography: Walter J. Harvey; Len Harris
- Edited by: Douglas Myers
- Music by: Bruce Campbell
- Production company: Hammer Film Productions
- Distributed by: Exclusive Films (UK)
- Release date: 11 February 1955 (UK)
- Running time: 81 minutes
- Country: United Kingdom
- Language: English

The Lyons in Paris (released in US as The Lyons Abroad) is a 1955 British comedy film directed by Val Guest and starring Ben Lyon, Bebe Daniels and Reginald Beckwith. It was a sequel to the 1954 film Life with the Lyons, and was shot at Southall Studios, though some genuine Paris location shots were used. The screenplay was formed by combining the plots of three of the radio scripts together. Filming began on 28 June 1954 and ended 26 July. The success of this film made Val Guest Hammer's top director.

== Plot ==
Has Ben Lyon forgotten his wedding anniversary? His wife Bebe thinks he has, and can hardly contain her fury. When his son Richard sees him dining with a glamorous French singer he thinks the worst. But Ben is actually buying tickets from her, and he surprises everyone with a family holiday to Paris. Once in Paris, there are further misunderstandings involving the singer, trouble with an antique car, as well as visits to a seedy nightclub and to the famous Folies Bergère.

== Cast ==
- Ben Lyon as Ben
- Bebe Daniels as Bebe
- Barbara Lyon as Barbara
- Richard Lyon as Richard
- Reginald Beckwith as Captain le Grand
- Horace Percival as Mr. Wimple
- Molly Weir as Aggie
- Hugh Morton as Colonel Price

== Production ==
Val Guest said "we all went to Paris and did our stint over there; we were not allowed to take any lamps at all. We had to shoot the whole thing without lamps, night as well. We’d get every car we had in the unit and turn the headlights on, and that was our lighting."

== Critical reception ==
David McGillivray wrote in the Radio Times, "director Val Guest maintains a brisk pace, and the Lyons are really rather endearing."
