= A Good Little Devil =

1914 American silent drama film

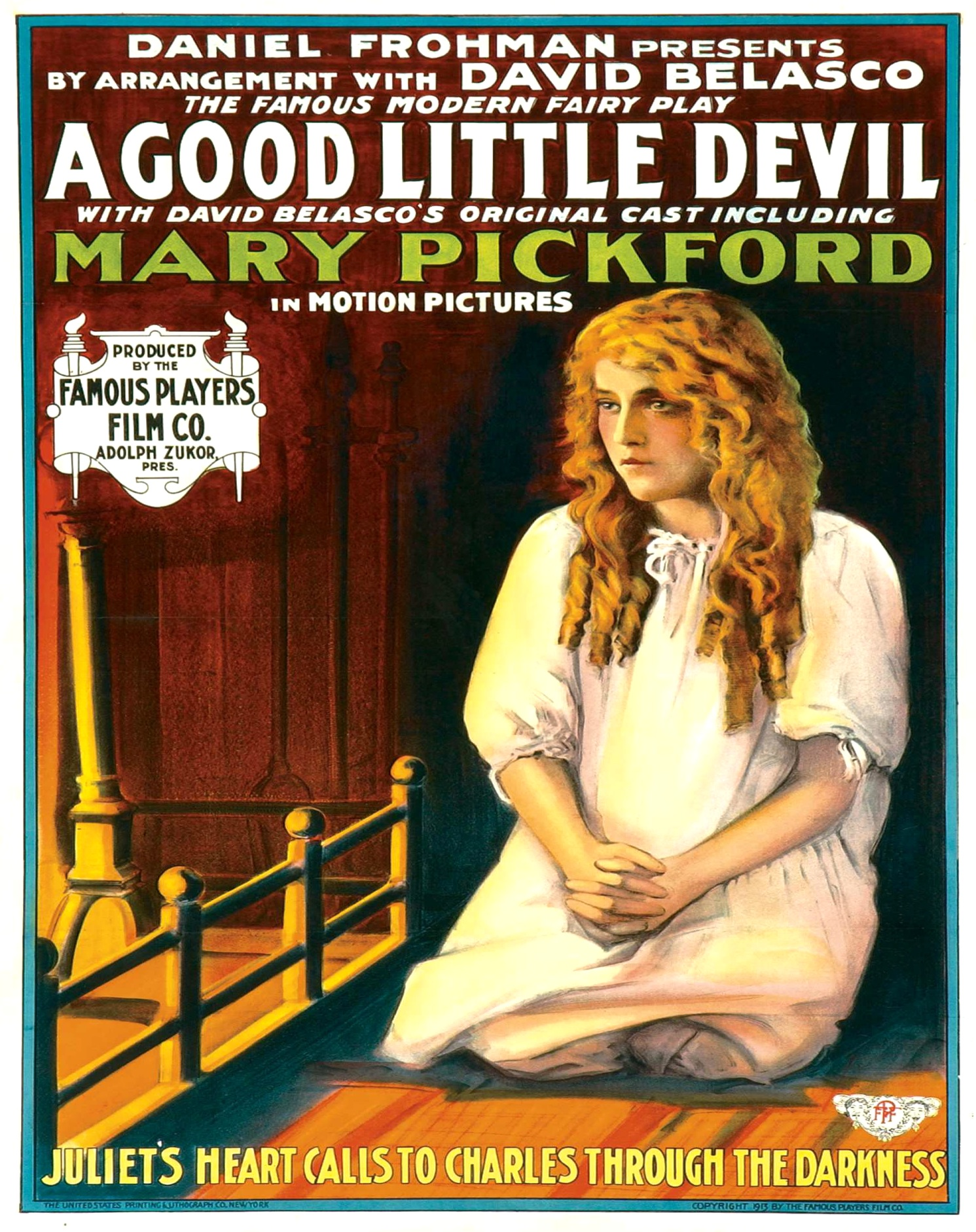
- Movie poster
- Directed by: Edwin S. Porter
- Written by: Rosemonde Gerard; Maurice Rostand; Austin Strong
- Based on: Un bon petit diable (play) by Rosemonde Gerard Maurice Rostand; A Good Little Devil (Broadway version of play) by Austin Strong
- Produced by: Adolph Zukor; Daniel Frohman; David Belasco (supervisor)
- Starring: Mary Pickford
- Cinematography: Edwin S. Porter
- Production company: Famous Players Film Company
- Distributed by: Famous Players Film Company (State's Rights)
- Release dates: July 10, 1913 (preview); March 1, 1914 (nationwide)
- Running time: 5 reels
- Country: United States
- Language: Silent (English intertitles)

A Good Little Devil is a 1914 American silent film starring Mary Pickford, produced by Adolph Zukor and Daniel Frohman, and distributed on a 'State's Rights' basis. It was Pickford's first feature-length film.

Pickford, along with friend Lillian Gish, appeared in the 1913 Broadway play version of the story prior to the film being made. Much of the cast of the play appeared in the film version. This film is essentially lost, with only one of the five reels surviving, along with a five-second clip in the 1931 film The House That Shadows Built.

The film was shot at the Famous Players studio on 26th Street in New York City.

== Cast ==
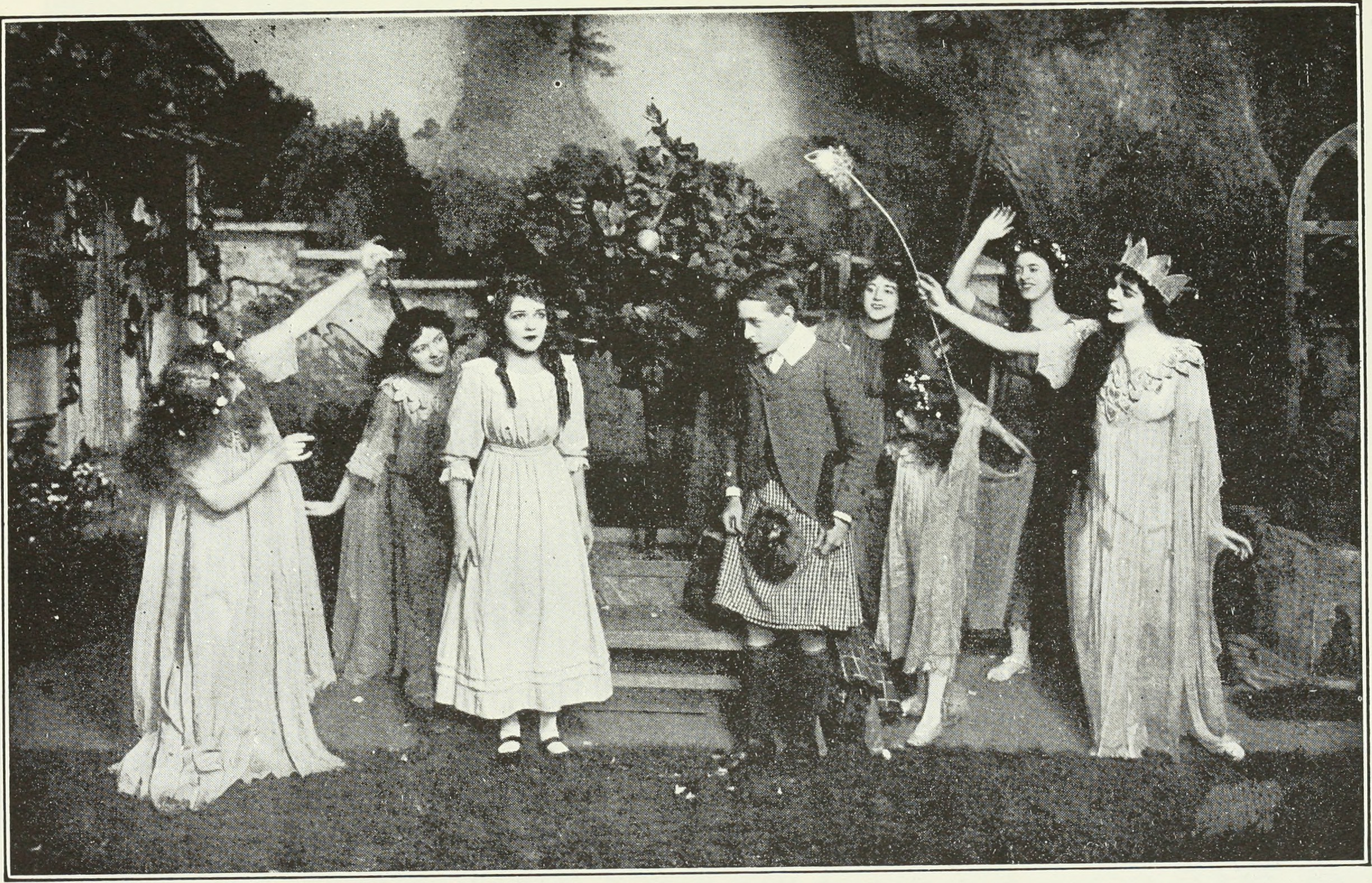
Mary Pickford and Ernest Truex in the 1913 Broadway production of A Good Little Devil

- Mary Pickford as Juliet
- Ernest Truex as Charles MacLance
- William Norris as Mrs. MacMiche
- Iva Merlin as Betsy
- Wilda Bennett as Queen Mab
- Arthur Hill as Rab, the dog
- Edward Connelly as Old Nick, Sr.
- Etienne Girardot as Old Nick, Jr.
- Ernest Lawford as A Poet
- David Belasco as himself
- Paul Kelly (unbilled)
