= Betty Lawford =

English film and stage actress

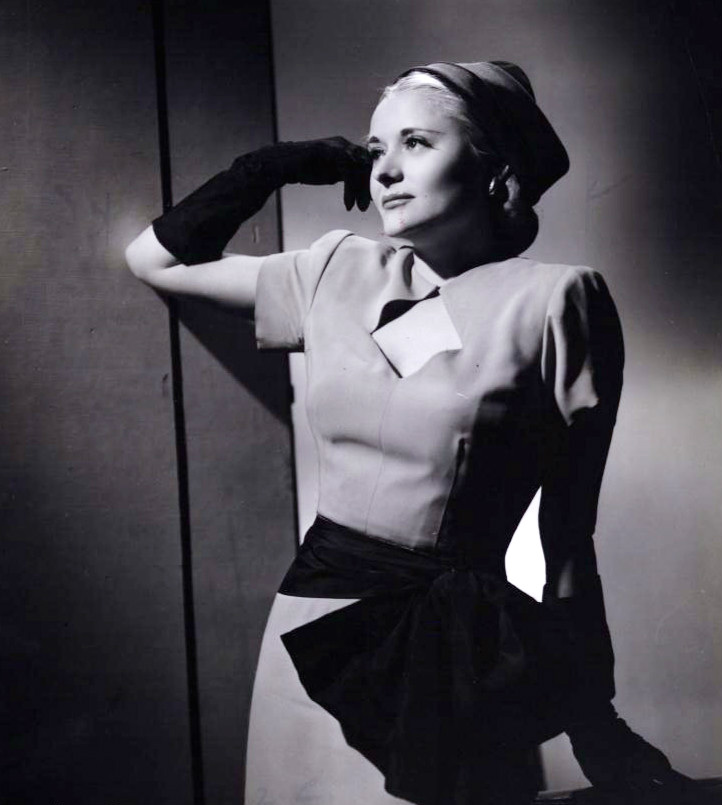
- Lawford in 1945
- Born: Betty Joan Lawford; February 1, 1912; London, England, UK
- Died: November 20, 1960 (aged 48); New York City, U.S.
- Years active: 1929–1947
- Spouse(s): Monta Bell (1931–37; divorced); Burton "Barry" Buchanan (1955–60; her death)
- Parent: Ernest Lawford
- Relatives: Peter Lawford (cousin)

Betty Joan Lawford (February 1, 1912 – November 20, 1960) was a United States–based English film, and stage actress.

== Early years ==
Betty Joan Lawford was born in London. Her parents, Ernest Lawford and Jeannette (or Janet Slater) Lawford, were also actors, and she was a cousin of the actor Peter Lawford. Her grandfather, C. D. Slater, was a well-known theatrical manager in London.

== Career ==
Lawford's stage debut came in a Players' Club production of Henry IV in 1926, while she was a student at Friends Seminary. She had skipped classes to perform in the play, but at her father's persuasion she resumed her studies for one more year.

She followed this role with appearances in Julius Caesar and The Lady Lies. Her Broadway credits include Glamour Preferred (1940), Walk With Music (1940), The Women (1936), There's Wisdom in Women (1935), Heat Wave (1931), The Lady Lies (1928), and King Henry IV, Part I (1926).

== Personal life and death ==
Lawford married film director Monta Bell in New York City on December 23, 1931. After they were divorced in Mexico in 1937, she married advertising and public relations executive Barry Buchanan in New York City on July 14, 1955.

She died on November 20, 1960, at Roosevelt Hospital, Manhattan, following an illness of three weeks.

== Filmography ==
- Gentlemen of the Press (1929)
- Lucky in Love (1929)
- The Return of Sherlock Holmes (1929)
- Old English (1930)
- Secrets of a Secretary (1931)
- Berkeley Square (1933)
- The Monkey's Paw (1933)
- Let's Be Ritzy (1934)
- Gallant Lady (1934)
- The Human Side (1934)
- Love Before Breakfast (1936)
- Criminal Lawyer (1937)
- Stolen Holiday (1937)
- Stage Door Canteen (1943)
- The Devil Thumbs a Ride (1947)
