= Born to Love (film) =

1931 film

- Theatrical Poster
- Directed by: Paul L. Stein
- Screenplay by: Ernest Pascal
- Starring: Constance Bennett; Joel McCrea; Paul Cavanagh
- Cinematography: John J. Mescall
- Edited by: Claude Berkeley
- Music by: Francis Gromon
- Production company: RKO Pathé
- Release date: April 17, 1931 (U.S.)
- Running time: 79 or 84 minutes
- Country: United States
- Language: English
- Budget: $338,000
- Box office: $649,000

Born to Love is a 1931 American pre-Code melodrama film, directed by Paul L. Stein from an original screenplay by Ernest Pascal. It starred Constance Bennett, Joel McCrea and Paul Cavanagh in a lovers' triangle set in London during World War I. It was only the second film produced by RKO Pathé after the merger of the two studios, and according to RKO records, it made a profit of $90,000.

== Plot ==
Doris Kendall is an American nurse working in London during World War I. During an air raid, she meets a young American Aviator, Captain Barry Craig, who is enjoying a brief leave from his duties. The two hit it off and fall in love. They plan to marry after the war, but for the moment, they simply enjoy each other's company. After a short while, Craig has to return to the front. It is not long before Doris receives notice that her lover has been shot down behind enemy lines and is presumed dead.

Disconsolate, she turns to a long-time friend and admirer, Sir Wilfred Drake. Soon it is apparent that the nights she spent with Craig are more than a memory, as she is pregnant with his child. On Armistice Day Drake proposes to Doris, who at first refuses, but he eventually convinces her that it will be best for both her and the baby.

They all seem happy for a time after she has the baby. The child will be the official heir to the Drake estate, and the couple get along quite well. That is, until Craig re-appears. When she finds out, she is torn by her marriage to Drake versus her love for Craig. Eventually, she can't help herself and goes to see Craig. When Drake discovers that not only did Doris go to see Craig but that she is still in love with him, he divorces her and takes custody of their son. But she still does not return to Craig, hoping that she will at some point be reunited with her child.

Two years later, Doris is still distraught over the way things have turned out. She has been forbidden to see her son during this time, but finally gets permission from Drake. However, when she arrives, she discovers that her son has died. Suicidal, she begins to wander the streets, until she is found by Craig, who is still in love with her, and whom she finally agrees to marry.

== Cast ==
- Constance Bennett as Doris Kendall
- Joel McCrea as Barry Craig
- Paul Cavanagh as Sir Wilfred Drake
- Frederick Kerr as Lord James Ponsonby
- Louise Closser Hale as Lady Agatha Ponsonby
- Anthony Bushell as Leslie Darrow
- Mary Forbes as Duchess
- Elizabeth Forrester as Evelyn Kent
- Claude King as Major General
- Edmond Breon as Tom Kent
- Reginald Sharland as Foppish Gentleman
- Daisy Belmore as Tibbetts
- Martha Mattox as Head Nurse
- Fred Esmelton as the butler, Roberts

(cast list as per AFI database)

== Reception ==
In an abysmal year, financially, for RKO Pictures, this film was one of the few financial successes for the studio, making a profit of $90,000.

The film received mixed reviews, Film Daily calling it, "A commonplace and inadequately motivated yarn ...", while Mordaunt Hall of The New York Times enjoyed it somewhat better, applauding the acting, directing and story, describing it as "... a smooth and rather attractive entertainment, remarkable chiefly for its generally adult outlook on things and for a certain quiet restraint in its more tempestuously dramatic moments."
