= No More Orchids =

1932 film

- Directed by: Walter Lang
- Screenplay by: Gertrude Purcell; Keene Thompson
- Based on: No More Orchids; 1932 novel by Grace Perkins
- Starring: Carole Lombard; Walter Connolly; Louise Closser Hale; Lyle Talbot; C. Aubrey Smith
- Cinematography: Joseph H. August
- Edited by: Jack Dennis
- Distributed by: Columbia Pictures
- Release date: November 25, 1932
- Running time: 71 minutes
- Country: United States
- Language: English

No More Orchids is a 1932 American pre-Code comedy-drama film starring Carole Lombard and Lyle Talbot as mismatched lovers, based on the novel of the same name by Grace Perkins.

== Plot ==
The departure of an ocean liner is held up to wait for spoiled heiress Anne Holt (Carole Lombard). Tony Gage (Lyle Talbot) expresses his contempt of her inconsiderate behavior to a fellow passenger, who agrees with him, even though she is the woman's paternal grandmother, Gran Holt (Louise Closser Hale). During the voyage, Anne and Tony become acquainted and fall in love, but he refuses to marry her because she is already engaged to Prince Carlos (Jameson Thomas) and because of the enormous financial gulf between them. He is too poor to even afford to buy her orchids.

Anne's father Bill (Walter Connolly) finds out and invites the man to dinner. He likes Tony very much. Eventually, Anne breaks down Tony's resistance and they become engaged.

However, there is a formidable obstacle—her grandfather Jerome Cedric (C. Aubrey Smith). He had already been foiled once before in his ambition to have royalty in the family, when his daughter married Bill against his wishes. The richest man in America, Cedric had arranged the marriage to Carlos, going so far as to finance a revolution to restore the prince to his position. When he learns of the danger to his plans, he first threatens to disinherit his granddaughter; when that does not work, he informs Anne that Bill's bank is on the verge of bankruptcy and that he will not prop it up unless she marries his choice. Heartbroken, Anne gives in and breaks off her engagement to Tony without telling him the reason.

When Bill finds out, he lies to Anne, telling her that he has found alternate financing to save the bank. He arranges an impromptu wedding for Anne and Tony. Then, he flies off in his plane, supposedly on business, but knowing that his life insurance policy is more than enough money to cover the bank's losses and his own failures, he flies the plane into a mountain to commit suicide.

Lobby card

== Cast ==
- Carole Lombard as Anne Holt
- Walter Connolly as Bill Holt
- Louise Closser Hale as Gran Holt
- Lyle Talbot as Tony Gage
- C. Aubrey Smith as Cedric
- Allen Vincent as Dick
- Ruthelma Stevens as Rita
- Arthur Housman as Serge
- William V. Mong as Burkehart
- Jameson Thomas as Prince Carlos
- Broderick O'Farrell as Benton

== Production ==
This was the first time that Lombard worked with cinematographer Joseph H. August. According to Robert Osborne of Turner Classic Movies, she was so pleased with the results, she always asked for him from then on. They reteamed for the film that made her a major star, Twentieth Century.
