= Irish Luck (1925 film) =

1925 film

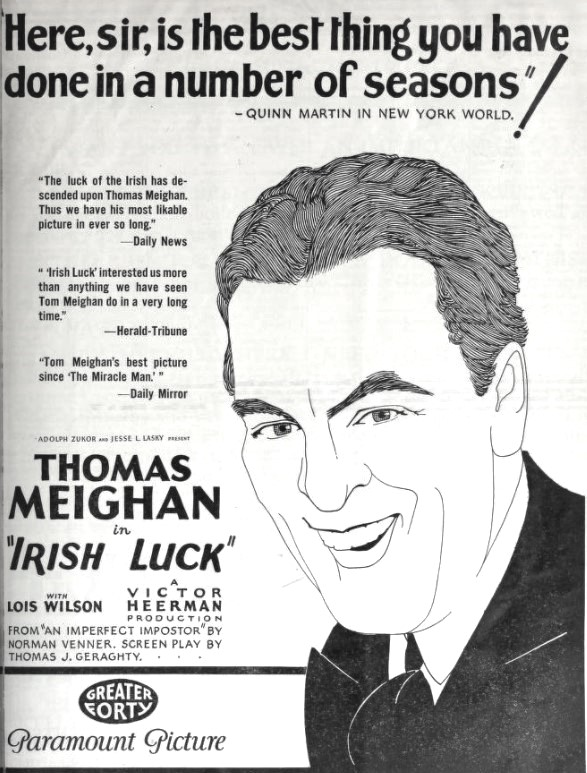
- Advertisement
- Directed by: Victor Heerman
- Written by: Norman Venner (story "The Imperfect Imposter")
- Produced by: Adolph Zukor; Jesse L. Lasky
- Starring: Thomas Meighan; Lois Wilson
- Cinematography: Alvin Wyckoff
- Production company: Famous Players–Lasky
- Distributed by: Paramount Pictures
- Release date: November 22, 1925
- Running time: 70 minutes 7 reels (7,008 feet)
- Country: United States
- Language: Silent (English intertitles)

Irish Luck is a 1925 American silent comedy-drama film directed by Victor Heerman, produced by Famous Players–Lasky, and distributed by Paramount Pictures.

== Plot ==
As described in a review in a film magazine, Tom Donahue, a Fifth Avenue traffic policeman from New York City, wins a trip to Ireland in a newspaper contest. He looks like Lord Fitzhugh, nephew of a nobleman who has cut him out of his will in favor of his cousine. On his deathbed, the Earl longs to make up with Fitzhugh. Fitzhugh's sister Gwendolyn meets Tom and takes him back to Killarney with her and, when Fitzhugh fails to appear, persuades Tom to impersonate him and gains the fortune. Eventually, Tom frees Fitzhugh, who had been lured to Killarney, and wins the love of the young woman.

== Cast ==
- Thomas Meighan as Tom Donahue / Lord Fitzhugh
- Lois Wilson as Lady Gwendolyn
- Cecil Humphreys as Douglas
- Claude King as Solicitor
- Ernest Lawford as Earl
- Charles Hammond as Doctor
- Louise Grafton as Aunt
- S. B. Carrickson as Uncle
- Charles Mcdonald as Denis MacSwiney
- Mary Foy as Kate MacSwiney

== Preservation ==
A print of Irish Luck is located in the George Eastman Museum Motion Picture Collection.
