= Molly Weir =

Scottish actress (1910–2004)

- Born: Mary Weir; 17 March 1910; Glasgow, Scotland
- Died: 28 November 2004 (aged 94); Pinner, London, England
- Years active: 1946–1999
- Height: 4 ft 10 in (147 cm)
- Spouse: Sandy Hamilton (m. 1939; died 1997)
- Family: Tom Weir (brother)

Mary Weir (17 March 1910 – 28 November 2004), known as Molly Weir, was a Scottish actress. She appeared as the character Hazel the McWitch in the BBC TV series Rentaghost.

She was the sister of naturalist and broadcaster Tom Weir.

== Biography ==
Born in Glasgow and brought up in the Springburn area of the city, Weir began in amateur dramatics. In her early professional career, she was a well-known radio actress, featuring in many comedy shows, such as ITMA. Her greatest theatrical success came in The Happiest Days of Your Life.

She made her film debut in 1949, and had a regular role as the housekeeper, Aggie McDonald, in the radio and television sitcom Life With The Lyons. During the 1970s and early 1980s she became famous as a writer, with several volumes of best-selling memoirs, notably, Shoes Were For Sunday. She also appeared in a series of television advertisements for Flash the household cleaning agent. In 1969, she appeared in The Prime of Miss Jean Brodie starring Dame Maggie Smith. She and Helena Gloag played the Kerr sisters, the sewing mistresses of Marcia Blaine School for Girls. In 1970 Weir and Gloag reprised their collaboration in Scrooge, playing old sisters in debt to Ebenezer Scrooge, played by Albert Finney.

In the 1970s she was one of the presenters of Teatime Tales, a television series broadcast by STV in which she recalled her childhood. The series also featured Lavinia Derwent and Cliff Hanley. In the 1980s, she lampooned this homely image in the comedy series Victoria Wood As Seen On TV and appeared in a pop video for The Bluebells 1983 hit "Young At Heart".

At the 1979 general election, Molly Weir was one of "a galaxy of stage and television stars" to appear at an election rally in support of the Conservative Party.

She is also the subject of the 1988 song "Molly's Lips" by The Vaselines, and later covered by Nirvana, described by Vaselines singer Eugene Kelly as 'what he'd like to do to her up a dark alleyway some night" in a live performance released in their album, Enter The Vaselines.

Following her death, Molly Weir's ashes were scattered on the banks of Loch Lomond, a favourite holiday location; and almost all her estate (of nearly £1.9 million), was bequeathed to charities.

== Selected filmography ==
=== Film ===
- Comin' Thro the Rye (1947)
- Floodtide (1949) - Mrs. McTavish
- Madeleine (1950) - Bit Part (uncredited)
- Something in the City (1950) - Nellie
- Flesh and Blood (1951) - Margaret
- Cheer the Brave (1951)
- You're Only Young Twice (1952) - Nellie (voice, uncredited)
- Forces' Sweetheart (1953) - Scots Maid
- Small Town Story (1953) - Maid (uncredited)
- The Diamond (1954) - Mrs. Sayer - Marline's Housekeeper (uncredited)
- Life with the Lyons (1954) - Aggie
- The Lyons in Paris (1955) - Aggie
- John and Julie (1955) - Landlady
- Value for Money (1955) - Mrs. Matthews (uncredited)
- Let's Be Happy (1957) - Flower Girl
- The Bridal Path (1959) - 2nd Waitress
- Carry On Regardless (1961) - Bird Woman
- What a Whopper (1961) - Teacher
- The Prime of Miss Jean Brodie (1969) - Miss Allison Kerr
- Scrooge (1970) - 1st Woman Debtor
- Hands of the Ripper (1971) - Maid
- Bless This House (1972) - Mary's Mother
- Assassin (1973) - Drunk Woman
- One of Our Dinosaurs Is Missing (1975) - Scots Nanny
- Mr. Selkie (1979) - Grannie Ross
- Captain Jack (1999) - Foula Operator

=== Television ===
- Life with the Lyons (1955-60) - Aggie (18 episodes)
- No Hiding Place (1962) - Mrs. Grerson (1 episode)
- Ghost Squad (1963) - Mrs. Henderson (1 episode)
- Compact (1963) - Mrs. Wagstaff (1 episode)
- Hugh and I (1963-4) - Fred's Mother (2 episodes)
- Dr. Finlay's Casebook (1964) - Mary Colquhoun (1 episode)
- Dixon of Dock Green (1964) - Mrs. Allen (1 episode)
- The Troubleshooters (1966) - Mrs. McBride (1 episode)
- Mystery and Imagination (1966) - Mrs. Jarvis
- Dr. Finlay's Casebook (1966) - Mrs. McClasym (1 episode)
- Beggar My Neighbour (1967) - Patient (1 episode)
- The Newcomers (1967) - Mrs. McPhee (2 episodes)
- Out of the Unknown (1969) - Nurse Maclean (1 episode)
- The Fenn Street Gang (1972) - Maude (1 episode)
- Oh Father! (1973) - Sister Anastasia (1 episode)
- Thriller (1974) - Mrs. Pendy (1 episode)
- Oil Strike North (1975) - Mrs McLeod (1 episode)
- Within These Walls (1976) - Effie Dunbar (1 episode)
- Doctor on the Go (1977) - Winnie (1 episode)
- All Creatures Great and Small (1978) - Mrs. Burns (1 episode)
- Rentaghost (1978-84) - Hazel the McWitch (34 episodes)
- The Enchanted Castle (1979) - Flowered Hat (1 episode)
- Andy Robson (1983) - Mrs. Irving (1 episode)
- Victoria Wood: As Seen on TV (1986) - Storyteller (1 episode)
- The High Life (1995) - Prof. Agnes Wormit (1 episode)
- Tales from the Crypt (1996) - Grandma Oakfist (1 episode)
- Screen Two (1996) - Annie (1 episode)
- The Peter Principle (1997) - Mrs. McLintock (1 episode)

== Books ==
- Shoes Were For Sunday. London: Hutchinson. 1970.
- Best Foot Forward. London: Hutchinson. 1972.
- A Toe On The Ladder. London: Hutchinson. 1973.
- Stepping into the Spotlight. London: Hutchinson. 1975.
- Walking into the Lyon's Den. London: Hutchinson. 1977.
- One Small Footprint. London: Hutchinson. 1980.
- Molly Weir's Recipes - New Ideas and Old Favourites. Gordon Wright Publishing. 1980.
- Spinning Like a Peerie. Edinburgh: Wright. 1983.
