= Night Nurse (1931 film) =

1931 film by William A. Wellman

- Theatrical release poster
- Directed by: William A. Wellman
- Screenplay by: Oliver H.P. Garrett; Charles Kenyon (additional dialogue)
- Based on: Night Nurse a 1930 novel by Dora Macy
- Starring: Barbara Stanwyck; Ben Lyon; Joan Blondell; Clark Gable
- Cinematography: Barney McGill
- Edited by: Edward M. McDermott
- Music by: Leo F. Forbstein
- Production company: Warner Bros. Pictures
- Distributed by: Warner Bros. Pictures
- Release date: August 8, 1931 (US)
- Running time: 72 minutes
- Country: United States
- Language: English

Night Nurse is a 1931 American pre-Code crime tragedy mystery film produced and distributed by Warner Bros. Pictures, directed by William A. Wellman, and starring Barbara Stanwyck, Ben Lyon, Joan Blondell, and Clark Gable. It is based on the 1930 novel of the same name by Dora Macy, the pen name of Grace Perkins. The film was considered risqué at the time of its release, particularly due to the scenes in which Stanwyck and Blondell are shown in their lingerie.

== Plot ==
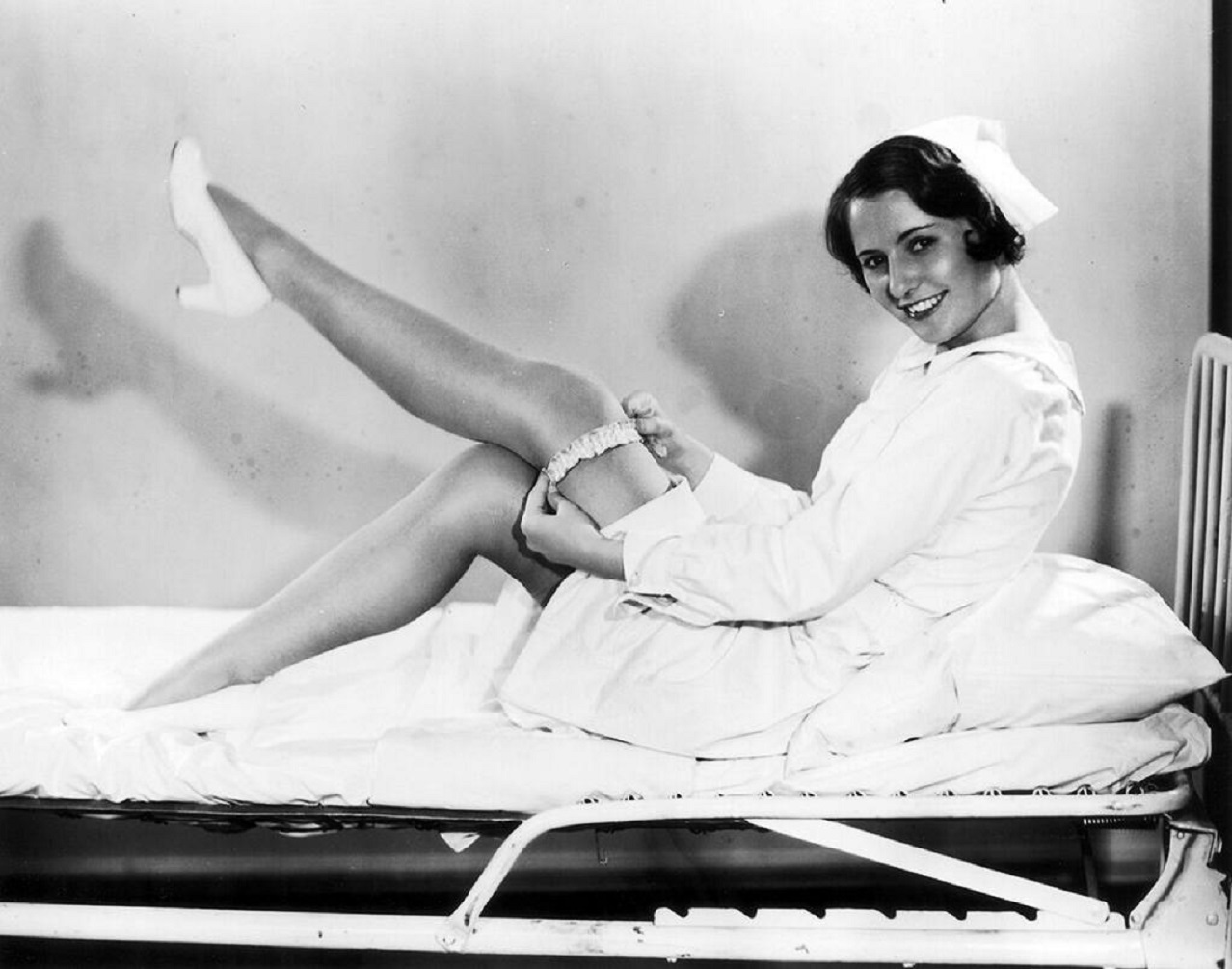
Barbara Stanwyck as Lora Hart, in a publicity still

Lora Hart applies for a job as a nurse trainee, but is rejected when the hospital's nursing superintendent, Miss Dillon, learns she does not have a high school diploma. After a chance encounter with the hospital's chief of staff, prominent surgeon Dr. Arthur Bell, Hart charms him, and he tells Dillon to hire her. Lora and Miss Maloney, a fellow nurse, are made roommates, and they soon become best friends.

For violating curfew one night, Dillon assigns Lora and Maloney to work the night shift in the emergency room. Lora treats a bootlegger named Mortie for a gunshot wound and agrees to not report the wound to the police—as the law requires—when he says he was shot for refusing to purchase potentially unsafe liquor from some gangsters. He tries to get to know Lora better, but she resists his advances.

After completing their training, Maloney gets Lora a position as a private nurse for two sick young girls, Desney and Nanny Ritchey, whose other sister recently died after being run over by a car. Maloney works the day shift, so Lora becomes the night nurse. Mrs. Ritchey, the girl's socialite mother, lives in an alcoholic stupor and is infatuated with her brutish chauffeur, Nick, though the mere mention of his name brings the girls to tears.

On Lora's first night at the Ritchey mansion, which is the site of frequent parties, a drunken guest calls Lora to aid an unconscious Mrs. Ritchey. The man ends up trying to molest Lora, and Nick knocks him out. Nick then demands that Lora pump Mrs. Ritchey's stomach; when she tries to call to get a doctor to approve the procedure, Nick knocks her out.

The Ritchey girls' physician is the drug-addicted "society doctor" Milton Ranger. Lora is alarmed by Dr. Ranger's dismissive response when she tells him what happened and that she thinks the girls are being starved to death, so she angrily quits. She goes to Dr. Bell with her suspicions, but he is reluctant to interfere with another doctor's patients, and tells her that she needs evidence. To gather it, Lora returns to work as the girls' night nurse.

Nanny becomes so weak that Lora fears she will die, but she is unable to get Mrs. Ritchey to show any concern. Mortie arrives to deliver liquor to the perpetual party at the mansion, and Lora sends him to get enough milk to give the girl a milk bath, primarily to appease the Ritchey's frightened housekeeper, Mrs. Maxwell. He steals some milk from a closed delicatessen, and the folk remedy is performed.

Mrs. Maxwell gets drunk and reveals to Lora that Nanny and Desney have a trust fund from their late father. Lora sees this as a motive for Nick, with Dr. Ranger's help, to deliberately starve the girls, as with them gone, the trust fund money would go to Mrs. Ritchey, and thereby Nick, since he can easily get the weak-willed woman to marry him.

Dr. Bell arrives, having been threatened by Mortie, and finally examines Nanny. He announces she needs an emergency blood transfusion, but Nick enters and knocks him out. A gun-toting Mortie stops Nick from interfering further, Dr. Bell recovers, and Nanny's life is saved—with the blood for the transfusion coming from Lora.

The next day, Lora asks Mortie for a ride to the police station to file a report. Lora says that she hates the thought that all of the Ritchey's dirty laundry will be made public during Nick's trial, but Mortie tells her that maybe Nick will not be arrested after all, as he has mentioned the situation to some of his criminal associates. An ambulance passes, and it delivers a corpse dressed in a chauffeur's uniform to the hospital's morgue.

== Cast ==
- Barbara Stanwyck as Lora Hart, a new nurse
- Ben Lyon as Mortie, a bootlegger who befriends Lora
- Joan Blondell as Maloney, a nurse who becomes Lora's friend
- Clark Gable as Nick, the Ritchey's chauffeur
- Blanche Friderici (credited as Blanche Frederici) as Mrs. Maxwell, the Ritchey's housekeeper, who cares for the girls
- Charlotte Merriam as Mrs. Ritchey, Nanny and Desney's widowed mother, who is an alcoholic
- Charles Winninger as Dr. Arthur Bell, a surgeon and the chief of staff at the hospital
- Edward Nugent as Eagan, an intern at the hospital
- Vera Lewis as Miss Dillon, the nursing superintendent at the hospital
- Ralf Harolde as Dr. Milton Ranger, a shady doctor in private practice
- Walter McGrail as Mack, an alcoholic friend of Mrs. Ritchey's
- Allan Lane as an intern at the hospital (uncredited)
- Marcia Mae Jones as Nanny Ritchey, the sicklier of Mrs. Ritchey's daughters (uncredited)
- Betty Jane Graham as Desney Ritchey, one of Mrs. Ritchey's sickly daughters (uncredited)

== Production ==
According to Robert Osborne of Turner Classic Movies, the part of "Nick the Chauffeur" was originally intended for James Cagney, but his success in The Public Enemy prevented his accepting a supporting role, which paved the way for Gable.

== Reception ==
In July 1931, Time magazine highly praised the film, mentioning that it was well photographed, directed, and acted, and that the quality of the filmed story surpassed that of the original novel. The New York Times called it exciting "at times."

According to Variety, "Night Nurse is a conglomeration of exaggerations, often bordering on serial dramatics... What legitimate performances crop up in the footage seem to belong to Joan Blondell and Charlie Winninger as the hospital head. Stanwyck plays her dancehall type of a girl on one note throughout and is shy of shading to lend her performance some color."

In a 21st-century review, Eric Allen Hatch, writing for the Baltimore City Paper, said: "watching [Stanwyck, Blondell, and Gable] in very early roles holds much of the appeal here, although the plot still works; a modern viewing of the film yields half high-camp value and half successful drama. Wellman would later strike gold with such films as Beau Geste (1939), but his salacious Night Nurse and hyperviolent Public Enemy were often cited in the creation of Hollywood's self-censoring Production Code."

== Preservation status ==
A print of the film has been part of the collection of the Library of Congress since the 1970s.

== Home media ==
The film has been released on videotape and on DVD (as part of the set "Forbidden Hollywood Collection, Vol. 2").
