= Personal Maid =

1931 film

- Directed by: Monta Bell; Lothar Mendes
- Screenplay by: Adelaide Heilbron
- Based on: Personal Maid by Grace Perkins
- Produced by: Lothar Mendes
- Starring: Nancy Carroll; Pat O'Brien; Gene Raymond; Mary Boland; George Fawcett
- Cinematography: Karl Freund
- Edited by: Arthur Ellis
- Production company: Paramount Pictures
- Distributed by: Paramount Pictures
- Release date: September 12, 1931
- Running time: 74 minutes
- Country: United States
- Language: English

Personal Maid is a 1931 American Pre-Code drama film directed by Monta Bell and Lothar Mendes and written by Adelaide Heilbron and Grace Perkins. The film stars Nancy Carroll, Pat O'Brien, Gene Raymond, Mary Boland, and George Fawcett. The film was released on September 12, 1931, by Paramount Pictures. It is based on the novel of the same title by Grace Perkins.

== Cast ==
- Nancy Carroll as Nora Ryan
- Pat O'Brien as Peter Shea
- Gene Raymond as Dick Gary
- Mary Boland as Mrs. Otis Gary
- George Fawcett as Gary Gary
- Hugh O'Connell as Kipp
- Ernest Lawford as Barrows
- Charlotte Wynters as Gwen Gary
- Jessie Busley as Ma Ryan
- Donald Meek as Pa Ryan

== See also ==
- The House That Shadows Built (1931) Paramount promotional film with excerpts of Personal Maid
