= The Savage (1926 film) =

1926 film by Fred C. Newmeyer

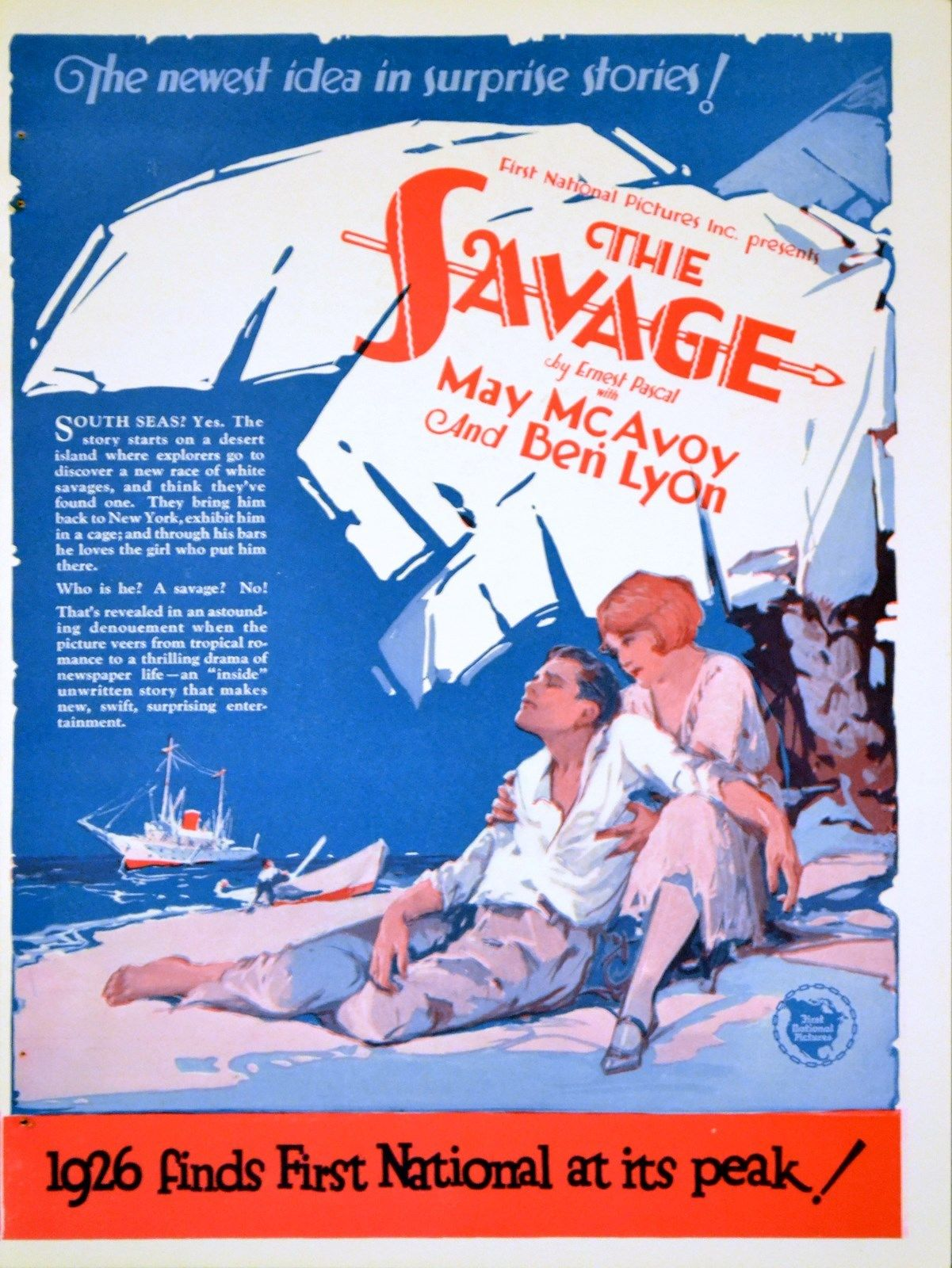
- Trade ad for the film
- Directed by: Fred C. Newmeyer
- Written by: Jane Murfin; Charles E. Whittaker
- Based on: short story by Ernest Pascal
- Produced by: First National
- Starring: Ben Lyon; May McAvoy
- Cinematography: George J. Folsey
- Edited by: Arthur Tavares
- Distributed by: First National Pictures
- Release date: July 18, 1926
- Running time: 6 reels
- Country: United States
- Language: Silent (English intertitles)

The Savage is a 1926 American silent romantic comedy film directed by Fred C. Newmeyer and starring Ben Lyon and May McAvoy. The film was produced and distributed by First National Pictures. Based on a short story by Ernest Pascal, it tells the story of a science writer who tries to discredit rivals of his by posing as a wild man.

== Cast ==
- Ben Lyon as Danny Terry
- May McAvoy as Ysabel Atwater
- Tom Maguire as Professor Atwater
- Philo McCullough as Howard Kipp
- Sam Hardy as Managing Editor
- Charlotte Walker as Mrs. Atwater

== Preservation ==
With no prints of The Savage located in any film archives, it is a lost film.
