= Air Hostess (1933 film) =

1933 film directed by Albert S. Rogell

- Theatrical film poster
- Directed by: Albert S. Rogell
- Written by: Milton Raison (adaptation)
- Screenplay by: Milton Raison; Keene Thompson
- Story by: Grace Perkins (uncredited)
- Produced by: Martin Johnson; Osa Johnson
- Starring: Evalyn Knapp; James Murray; Arthur Pierson
- Cinematography: Joseph Walker; Elmer Dyer (aerial scenes)
- Edited by: Richard Cahoon
- Production company: Columbia Pictures
- Distributed by: Columbia Pictures
- Release date: January 15, 1933 (United States)
- Running time: 67 minutes
- Country: United States
- Language: English

Air Hostess is a 1933 American Pre-Code aviation-themed melodrama based on a serial published in a 1919 True Story Magazine article called Air Hostess by Grace Perkins, also known as Dora Macy. (Note: The article also appeared in the October 1932–February 1933 issue.) Director Albert Rogell who had moved from shorts to B-films, had been interested in aviation having already helmed a similar feature, The Flying Marine (1929). In Air Hostess, the studio had attempted to merge flying and romance. Advertising stressed, "A date in the skies ... a rendezvous in the heavens...where love zooms with thrill after thrill ... but finds a happy landing!"

Evalyn Knapp plays a TWA air hostess attracted to a grandstanding pilot, despite the better advice of the blind mechanic and other employees who watch over her.) Knapp was being touted as a future star, with a starring role in Sinners' Holiday (1930), but eventually lost her A-status and was relegated to such B-fare as Air Hostess.

== Plot ==
In World War I, pilot Bob King is shot and killed in France. His friends Ted "Lucky" Hunter and Pa Kearns pledge to look after his daughter, Kitty. (Note: Characters also refer to Pa Kearns as "Pop" and "Popa Kearny".) Years later, after the war, Kearns, now blind, works at an airport as an engine expert while Kitty is a TWA stewardess. Her father's friends still look after her as meddling chaperones.

A grandstanding Ted flies over the airport, meeting Kitty who is enamored with him. After a night on the town, he flies her back to the airport, but is met by angry mechanics and pilot Dick Miller, who is in love with Kitty and ends up in a fight.

Ted soon announces his marriage to Kitty and forces her to quit her job. Dick gets her her job back when Ted is unable to make a living. Rich, three-time divorcee Sylvia Carleton offers Ted a chance to build a radical new aircraft that can fly across the Pacific. A tête-à-tête between Ted and Sylvia in Albuquerque turns into a fiasco when Kitty and Dick arrive to find them both drunk.

Kitty leaves angrily for home, boarding a train that Ted and Dick learn is headed for a collapsing bridge. Both men try to save Kitty by flying to warn the engineer. Ted crash-lands on the tracks and wrecks his aircraft, but stops the train in time. Dick flies him back to the hospital with Kitty, as the couple reunites.

== Cast ==
As appearing in Air Hostess, (main roles and screen credits identified):

- Evalyn Knapp as Kitty King
- James Murray as Ted Hunter
- Arthur Pierson as Dick Miller
- Jane Darwell as Ma Kearns (Note: Although listed as Ma Kearns in the film credits, a sign at the airport advertises "Ma Kearny's Special Steak Dinner".)
- J.M. Kerrigan as Pa Kearns
- Thelma Todd as Mrs. Carleton
- Mike Donlin as Mike
- Dutch Hendrian as Spike (the mechanic)

== Production ==
Transcontinental-Western Airlines Ford 5-AT-B Trimotor (NC9607) was extensively featured in the film. On August 29, 1933, the Trimotor was destroyed at Quay, New Mexico, in an accident that killed all five on board.

Air Hostess was shot primarily at the Glendale Grand Central Air Terminal and airport, as well as at Albuquerque, New Mexico. Aerial scenes in Air Hostess were reprised from earlier films. In 1933, the film industry became more safety-conscious, with screen air crashes largely replaced by the use of appropriate scenes clipped from earlier epics such as Wings (1927), Hell's Angels (1930) and The Dawn Patrol (1930).

Aircraft used in the film include:

- Aeronca C-3
- Buhl LA-1 Bull Pup
- Catron & Fisk CF-11
- Fleet Husky 1
- Fokker D.VII
- Fokker F-10A
- Ford Trimotor
- Northrop Gamma
- Ryan Brougham
- Stearman C3
- Stinson R-2
- Stinson SM-1 Detroiter
- Stinson SM-2AC
- Thomas-Morse MB-3
- Travel Air 2000
- Waco 9

== Reception ==
Considered along with other aviation films of the era, Air Hostess is a modest, B-film but has some redeeming qualities that have stood the film well over the years. A contemporary review in The New York Times noted: "... is pleasantly acted by James Murray, Arthur Pierson and Evalyn Knapp. Thelma Todd interprets the seductive blonde so heavily as to flavor the whole picture with a tinge of burlesque. Some of the air sequences have their moments of excitement, but Air Hostess needs more than airplanes to conceal the antiquity of its plot." In reviewing Air Hostess in a historical sense, the extensive use of the aircraft of the period now provides a near-documentary look at North American civil aviation in 1933.
