= Life with the Lyons =

British radio and TV series (1950–1961)

- Genre: Sitcom
- Created by: Bebe Daniels
- Developed by: Bebe Daniels; Bob Block; Bill Harding
- Starring: Bebe Daniels; Ben Lyon; Barbara Lyon; Richard Lyon
- Country of origin: United Kingdom
- Original language: English
- No. of series: 5
- No. of episodes: 40

Production
- Running time: 30 minutes
- Production company: Associated-Rediffusion (series 3–5)

Original release
- Network: BBC TV (series 1–2); ITV (series 3–5)
- Release: 29 June 1955 – 25 March 1960

Life with the Lyons is a British radio and television sitcom franchise that ran between 1950 and 1961.

== Background ==
Following a highly publicized trial against their stalker, American actors Ben Lyon and Bebe Daniels moved to London in 1935. For several years, the couple commuted between London and Los Angeles, where their children resided with Daniels' mother and Lyon was under contract to 20th Century Fox.

At the advent of World War II, Lyon and Daniels were touring England in vaudeville when Lyon developed the idea for a radio series in an effort to boost morale. In 1940, the couple debuted Hi, Gang!, in which they starred with Vic Oliver with scripts written by Daniels. During the war, Lyon joined the newly formed Special Services unit of the United States military while Daniels served as a war correspondent. Following the war, the Lyons moved to London permanently with their children. Deciding to expand their show into a family effort, Hi, Gang! ended in 1949.

Life With the Lyons was created by Daniels, which she developed with Bob Block and Bill Harding. The trio would often work on scripts late at night in the family's basement. The show featured a fictionalized version of the family, with Barbara Lyon and Richard Lyon starring as their children. Molly Weir was also cast as the family's Scottish maid, Aggie MacDonald. For the fifth to seventh series of the radio show – and the first two series of the television adaption – Richard Bellaers starred as Robin Lyon, the couple's youngest child. Also cast were Horace Percival as their henpecked neighbour, Mr Wimple, and Doris Rogers as Florrie Wainwright, Bebe's nosy friend who frequently spars with Ben.

== Radio ==
Life With the Lyons debuted on BBC Radio on 5 November 1950. It was the first scripted situation comedy show in the United Kingdom. The series ran for 252 episodes over eleven seasons, ending on 19 May 1961.

Daniels and Block served as writers for all eleven seasons. Harding departed the series after seasons three, and was replaced by Ronnie Hanbury. Other writers for the series used on occasion included Jill Allgood, Brad Ashton, Robert Hounsome, and Ray Sonin.

Many radio episodes were not kept by the BBC and only three episodes are in the archives; these were on BBC Radio 7 in early 2011. Following this broadcast, the BBC were alerted to a private collection of around 200 episodes owned by Graeme Stevenson in Scotland, and a selection of 14 episodes were rebroadcast on Radio 7's successor BBC Radio 4 Extra between July and December 2011 and rebroadcast at later dates.

=== Cast ===
- Bebe Daniels Lyon as Bebe Lyon
- Ben Lyon as Ben Lyon
- Barbara Lyon as Barbara Lyon
- Richard Lyon as Richard Lyon
- Molly Weir as Aggie MacDonald
- Richard Bellaers as Robin Lyon (series 5–7, radio; series 1–2, television)
- Horace Percival as Mr Wimple
- Doris Rogers as Florrie Wainwright

Following Barbara's marriage to Russell Turner, he began a recurring role as her husband Russell. Hugh Morton recurred throughout the series as Ben's boss.

== Films ==
Two feature films both directed by Val Guest were made with the cast of the series between the radio and television versions. The Lyons' contract called for them to receive a percentage of the film's profits.

- Life with the Lyons (1954)
- The Lyons in Paris (1955)

== Television ==
In 1954, the family appeared in a special on BBC Television. Following its success and that of the first feature film, the network approved a television adaption of Life With the Lyons. BBC aired the first two series, consisting of four episodes each, in the summers of 1955 and 1956 respectively. In 1957, ITV picked up the series for a full fall series of 10 episodes. The show remained on ITV for another three seasons until it ended in 1960.

Only six episodes survive in television archives. One from the first series, two each from the third and fourth, and one from the final series. The surviving first-season episode was shown on BBC Four on 27 March 2005 as part of the "TV on Trial" season. The episode was not shown "in the clear" – viewers had the choice of a version without commentary but with on-screen logos, or with commentary by Roy Hattersley and Kathryn Flett.

=== Episode guide ===
==== Series 1 (1955) ====
No. overall	No. in series	Title	Written by	Original release date
1	1	TBA	Bebe Daniels, Bob Block & Bill Harding	29 June 1955
2	2	TBA	Bebe Daniels, Bob Block & Bill Harding	13 July 1955
Bebe and Ben invite Richard's crush Marilyn (Sylvia Syms) to dinner, only to discover she has a very busy romantic life – which includes Barbara's boyfriend.
3	3	TBA	Bebe Daniels, Bob Block & Bill Harding	27 July 1955
4	4	TBA	Bebe Daniels, Bob Block & Ronnie Hanbury	10 August 1955

==== Series 2 (1956) ====
No. overall	No. in series	Title	Written by	Original release date
5	1	TBA	Bebe Daniels, Bob Block & Ronnie Hanbury	31 May 1956
6	2	TBA	Bebe Daniels, Bob Block & Ronnie Hanbury	14 June 1956
7	3	TBA	Bebe Daniels, Bob Block & Ronnie Hanbury	28 June 1956
8	4	TBA	Bebe Daniels, Bob Block & Ronnie Hanbury	12 July 1956

==== Series 3 (1957–58) ====
No. overall	No. in series	Title	Written by	Original release date
9	1	"The Green-Eyed Monster"	Bebe Daniels, Bob Block & Bob Ross	17 September 1957
10	2	"Family Secrets"	Bebe Daniels, Bob Block & Bob Ross	1 October 1957
11	3	"I've Got You Covered"	Bebe Daniels, Bob Block & Bob Ross	15 October 1957
12	4	"Cool Cat on a Hot Roof"	Bebe Daniels, Bob Block & Bob Ross	29 October 1957
13	5	"Going, Going, Gone"	Bebe Daniels, Bob Block & Bob Ross	12 November 1957
14	6	"Where There's A Will"	Bebe Daniels, Bob Block & Bob Ross	26 November 1957
15	7	"Unlucky Winner"	Bebe Daniels, Bob Block & Bob Ross	19 December 1957
16	8	"'Twas the Night Before"	Bebe Daniels, Bob Block & Bob Ross	24 December 1957
17	9	"Danger – Woman at Work"	Bebe Daniels, Bob Block & Bob Ross	7 January 1958
18	10	"Signs of The Times"	Bebe Daniels, Bob Block & Bob Ross	21 January 1958

==== Series 4 (1958–59) ====
No. overall	No. in series	Title	Written by	Original release date
19	1	"Who's Your Lady Friend?"	Bebe Daniels, Bob Ross, Ronnie Hanbury & Bob Block	19 September 1958
20	2	"The Reluctant Genius"	Bebe Daniels, Bob Ross, Ronnie Hanbury & Bob Block	3 October 1958
21	3	"Dangerous Curves Ahead"	Bebe Daniels, Bob Ross, Ronnie Hanbury & Bob Block	17 October 1958
22	4	"Boxing Gloves"	Bebe Daniels, Bob Ross, Ronnie Hanbury & Bob Block	31 October 1958
23	5	"A Guest in the House"	Bebe Daniels, Bob Ross, Ronnie Hanbury & Bob Block	28 November 1958
24	6	"Thirteen Shop-Lifting Days To Christmas"	Bebe Daniels, Bob Ross, Ronnie Hanbury & Bob Block	12 December 1958
25	7	"The Sheriff of Fractured Wrist"	Bebe Daniels, Bob Ross, Ronnie Hanbury & Bob Block	26 December 1958
26	8	"It's A Woman's World"	Bebe Daniels, Bob Ross, Ronnie Hanbury & Bob Block	9 January 1959
27	9	"King Richard The Last"	Bebe Daniels, Bob Ross, Ronnie Hanbury & Bob Block	23 January 1959

==== Series 5 (1960) ====
No. overall	No. in series	Title	Written by	Original release date
28	1	"A Cowboy in Kensington"	Bebe Daniels, Ronnie Hanbury & Bob Block	1 January 1960
29	2	"Home Sweet Homicide"	Bebe Daniels, Ronnie Hanbury & Bob Block	8 January 1960
30	3	"Stupid Cupid"	Bebe Daniels, Ronnie Hanbury & Bob Block	15 January 1960
31	4	"Teddy Boys' Picnic"	Bebe Daniels, Ronnie Hanbury & Bob Block	22 January 1960
32	5	"For Love Or Money"	Bebe Daniels, Ronnie Hanbury & Bob Block	29 January 1960
33	6	"Just What the Doctor Ordered"	Bebe Daniels, Ronnie Hanbury & Bob Block	5 February 1960
34	7	"Top Secret"	Bebe Daniels, Ronnie Hanbury & Bob Block	12 February 1960
35	8	"Tease For Two"	Bebe Daniels, Ronnie Hanbury & Bob Block	19 February 1960
36	9	"Your Presents Are Requested"	Bebe Daniels, Ronnie Hanbury & Bob Block	26 February 1960
37	10	"A Chip Off The Old Blockhead"	Bebe Daniels, Ronnie Hanbury & Bob Block	4 March 1960
38	11	"The Nelson Touch"	Bebe Daniels, Ronnie Hanbury & Bob Block	11 March 1960
39	12	"Sauce for the Goose"	Bebe Daniels, Ronnie Hanbury & Bob Block	18 March 1960
40	13	"Be My Ghost"	Bebe Daniels, Ronnie Hanbury & Bob Block	25 March 1960

== Other versions ==
Life With the Lyons also appeared as a play, and in seven Royal Command Performances.

== In popular culture ==
- John Lennon was a fan of the radio show, and paid tribute to the show in his second album with Yoko Ono, Unfinished Music No.2: Life with the Lions.
- In his song "Post World War Two Blues", on the album Past, Present & Future (1973), Al Stewart sings, "We were locked up safe and warm from the snow / With 'Life with the Lyons' on the radio...".
