= Ernest Pascal =

American author, screenwriter

- Born: January 11, 1896; London, England, United Kingdom
- Died: November 4, 1966 (aged 70); Bernardsville, New Jersey, United States
- Occupations: Screenwriter; author; poet; playwright
- Years active: 1923–1941
- Spouse: Barbara Herriman

Ernest Pascal (January 11, 1896 – November 4, 1966) was an English-born American screenwriter, author, playwright, and poet.

== Career ==
Originally an author, Pascal became involved in the film industry when his novels began to be optioned into films during the silent era of film. However, most of his career was during the sound era. In addition, Pascal penned several Broadway plays as well. He married the daughter of famed cartoonist George Herriman, Barbara, and they had one daughter prior to Barbara's death from complications from surgery in 1939.

In 1947, Pascal was hired by RKO Pictures to write a story based on the Lewis and Clark Expedition of 1804. However, Warner Brothers procured the rights to the script, but when production was delayed, it was eventually permanently shelved after Paramount produced their 1955 film based on the same event entitled, The Far Horizons.

== Filmography ==
(Per AFI database)

- Chastity (1923)
- The Savage (1926)
- Man-Made Women (1928)
- Interference (1929)
- El último de los Vargas (1930)
- Last of the Duanes (1930)
- The Age for Love (1931)
- Born to Love (1931)
- Fair Warning (1931)
- Husband's Holiday (1931)
- The Spy (1931)
- The King's Vacation (1933)
- As the Earth Turns (1934)
- Grand Canary (1934)
- The White Parade (1934)
- Helldorado (1934)
- The Human Side (1934)
- Here's to Romance (1935)
- Under the Pampas Moon (1935)
- Lloyd's of London (1937)
- Wee Willie Winkie (1937)
- Love Under Fire (1937)
- Kidnapped (1938)
- The Hound of the Baskervilles (1939)
- Hollywood Cavalcade (1939)
- The Blue Bird (1940)
- Flesh and Fantasy (1943)
- Jack London (1943)
- Destiny (1944)
- Canyon Passage (1946)
- Night in Paradise (1946)
