= Ben Lyon =

American actor (1901–1979)

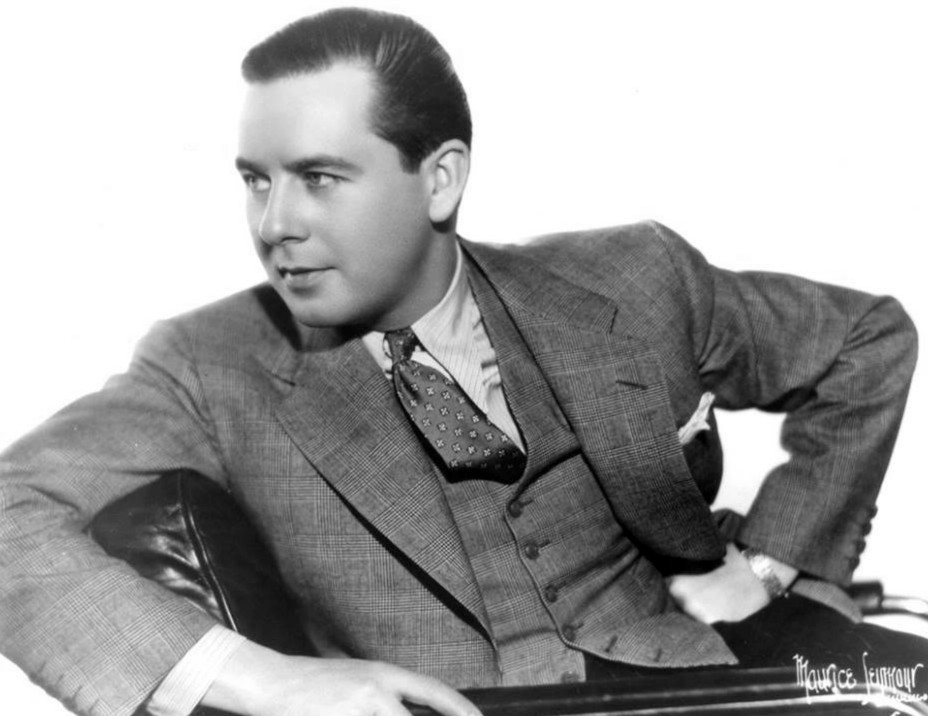
- Lyon in 1936
- Born: February 6, 1901; Atlanta, Georgia, U.S.
- Died: March 22, 1979 (aged 78); Honolulu, Hawaii, U.S.
- Resting place: Hollywood Forever Cemetery
- Years active: 1918–1961
- Spouses: Bebe Daniels (m. 1930; died 1971) Marian Nixon (m. 1972)
- Children: 2, including Barbara Lyon
- Awards: Hollywood Walk of Fame

Ben Lyon (February 6, 1901 – March 22, 1979) was an American film actor and a studio executive at 20th Century-Fox who later acted in British radio, films and TV.

== Early life and career ==
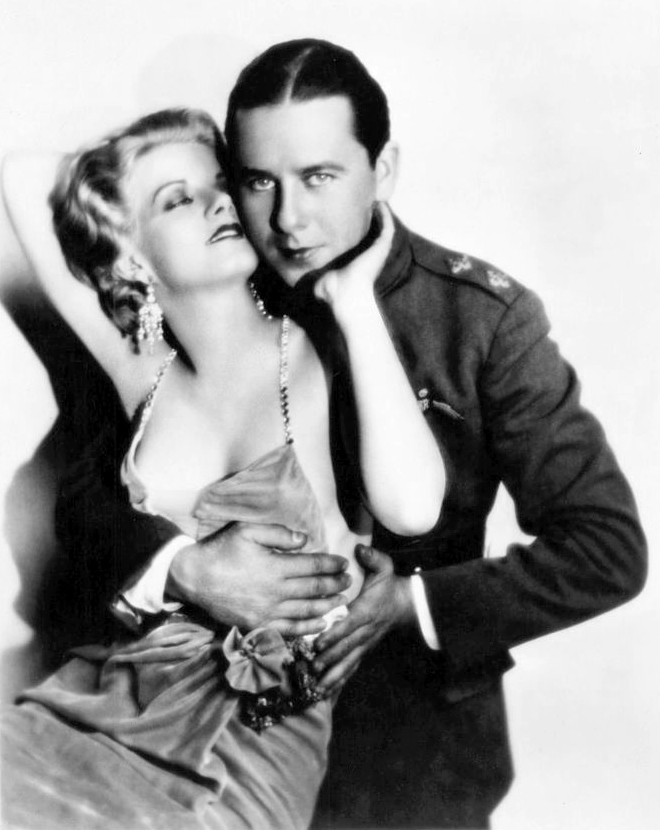
Jean Harlow and Ben Lyon in Hell's Angels (1930)

Lyon was born in Atlanta, Georgia, the son of Alvine W. (Wiseberg) and Ben Lyon, a travelling salesman. His family was Jewish. Lyon entered films in 1918 after a successful appearance on Broadway opposite Jeanne Eagels. He attracted attention in the highly successful film Flaming Youth (1923) and steadily developed into a leading man. He was successfully paired with some of the leading actresses of the silent era, including Pola Negri, Gloria Swanson, Colleen Moore, Barbara La Marr, Viola Dana, Anna Q. Nilsson, Mary Astor and Blanche Sweet. In 1925, a writer for Photoplay wrote of him, "Girls, Ben Lyon looks harmless but we have reliable information that he's irresistible, so watch your step. Besides he's a mighty fine actor and if the ladies must fall in love with him he can't help it."

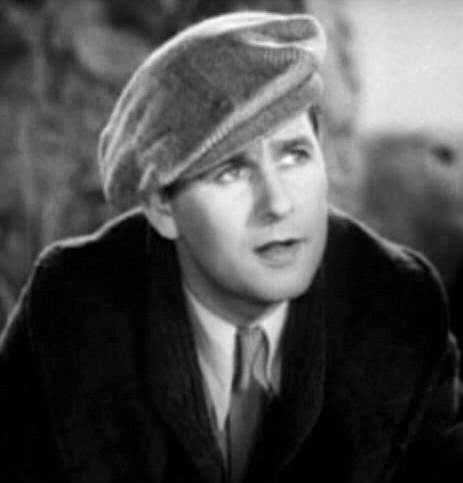
Lyon in I Cover the Waterfront (1933)

He had success as an actor in the 1930 film Hell's Angels. The film was a major success and brought Jean Harlow to prominence, but Lyon's performance as a heroic World War I aviator was also highly regarded. For the next decade he was constantly in demand, but his popularity began to wane by the early 1940s. By the mid 1940s he was working for 20th Century-Fox. On July 17, 1946, he met a young aspiring actress named Norma Jeane Dougherty. After his first meeting with her, he stated that she was "Jean Harlow all over again!" He organized a color screen test for the actress, renamed her, and finally signed her as Marilyn Monroe to her first studio contract.

During World War II, when the United States was still neutral, Lyon and his wife, actress Bebe Daniels, settled in London. The couple, along with the comedian Vic Oliver, starred in the radio series Hi, Gang!, which ran from 1940 to 1949. Hi Gang was succeeded in 1950 by Life with the Lyons, which also featured their real-life son Richard and daughter Barbara, and spawned a couple of theatrical films as well as a television series on BBC and independent television from 1954 until 1960. Bebe Daniels had top billing in these series, similar to the concurrent American show starring married couple Lucille Ball and Desi Arnaz.

First broadcasts of "Life with the Lyons" finished on BBC Radio (the Light Programme) in October 1961

He also appeared in an episode of Starlight. No episodes are known to survive. He was a comedian in that show.

He was the subject of This Is Your Life in March 1963, when he was surprised by Eamonn Andrews at the BBC Television Theatre.

== Military service ==
Lyon served as a pilot in the 322nd Pursuit Squadron in the early 1930s. During World War II he served as a lieutenant colonel in the US Army Air Forces Special Services.

== Personal life and death ==
Lyon married actress Bebe Daniels in June 1930. They had two children, daughter Barbara in 1931 and an adopted son Richard. In an issue of the contemporary magazine Radio Pictorial, Bebe explained how she saw Richard peering through the railings at a London orphanage and instantly thought "A brother for Barbara". Daniels suffered a severe stroke in 1963 and withdrew from public life. She suffered a second stroke in late 1970. She died at the couple's London home in March 1971.

On April 1, 1972, Lyon married the actress Marian Nixon, whom he had known since the 1920s. They remained married until his death. She died five years later, also at age 78.

On March 22, 1979, Lyon and his second wife, Marian Nixon, were vacationing together on the Queen Elizabeth 2 cruise ship near Honolulu, Hawaii, when Lyon suffered a fatal heart attack. He was 78 years old. His body was cremated and is interred in the Chapel Columbarium at Hollywood Forever Cemetery next to his first wife, Bebe Daniels.

For his contribution to the motion picture industry, Ben Lyon has a star on the Hollywood Walk of Fame at 1724 Vine Street.

Jill Allgood lived with Bebe and Ben Lyon for many years in their large apartment at Dolphin Square, London. Bebe and Ben Lyon were the godparent to Allgood's niece, Suzanne Allgood.

== Filmography ==
Year	Film	Role	Director	Notes
1918	The Transgressor			
1919	Open Your Eyes	Harold Connors	Gilbert P. Hamilton	
1921	The Heart of Maryland	Bob Telfair	Tom Terriss	Lost film
1923	The Custard Cup	Dick Chase	Herbert Brenon	Lost film
1923	Potash and Perlmutter	Boris Andrieff	Clarence G. Badger	Lost film
1923	Flaming Youth	Monty Standish	John Francis Dillon	Incomplete, one reel survives
1924	Painted People	Don Lane	Clarence G. Badger	Lost film
1924	The White Moth	Douglas Morley	Maurice Tourneur	
1924	Wine of Youth	Lynn Talbot	King Vidor	
1924	Lily of the Dust	Lt. Prell	Dimitri Buchowetzki	Lost film
1924	Wages of Virtue	Marvin	Allan Dwan	Lost film
1924	So Big	Dirk DeJong	Charles Brabin	Lost film
1925	One Way Street	Bobby Austin	John Francis Dillon	Lost film
1925	The Necessary Evil	Frank Jerome	George Archainbaud	Lost film
1925	Winds of Chance	Pierce Phillips	Frank Lloyd	
1925	The Pace That Thrills	Danny Wade	Webster Campbell	Lost film
1925	The New Commandment	Billy Morrow	Howard Higgin	Lost film
1925	Bluebeard's Seven Wives	John Hart / Don Juan Hartez	Alfred Santell	Lost film
1926	The Reckless Lady	Ralph Hilliwe	Howard Higgin	Lost film
1926	The Savage	Danny Terry	Fred C. Newmeyer	Lost film
1926	The Great Deception	Cyril Mansfield	Howard Higgin	Lost film
1926	Prince of Tempters	Francis	Lothar Mendes	
1927	The Perfect Sap	Herbert Alden	Howard Higgin	Lost film
1927	High Hat	Jerry	James Ashmore Creelman	
1927	The Tender Hour	Wally McKenzie	George Fitzmaurice	
1927	Dance Magic	Leach Norcutt	Victor Halperin	Lost film
1927	For the Love of Mike	Mike	Frank Capra	Lost film
1927	Dancing Vienna	Jonny Conzaga	Frederic Zelnik	Lost film
1929	The Air Legion	Dave	Bert Glennon	
1929	All Faces West	Mathew	Raymond K. Johnson	
1929	The Quitter	Neal Abbott	Joseph Henabery	
1929	The Flying Marine	Steve Moran	Albert S. Rogell	
1930	Lummox	Rollo Farley	Ray Lissner	
1930	Alias French Gertie	Jimmy Hartigan	George Archainbaud	
1930	Hell's Angels	Monte Rutledge	Howard Hughes; James Whale (dialogue)	
1930	What Men Want	Kendall James	Ernst Laemmle	
1930	A Soldier's Plaything	Georgie	Michael Curtiz	
1931	The Hot Heiress	'Hap' Harrigan	Clarence G. Badger	
1931	Misbehaving Ladies	Phil Hunter	William Beaudine	
1931	Indiscreet	Tony Blake	Leo McCarey	
1931	Aloha	Jimmy Bradford	Albert S. Rogell	
1931	My Past	Robert 'Bob' Byrne	Roy Del Ruth	
1931	Night Nurse	Mortie	William A. Wellman	
1931	Bought	Nick Amory	Archie Mayo	
1931	Her Majesty, Love	Fred von Wellingen	William Dieterle	
1931	Compromised	Sidney Brock	Ben Silvey	Lost film
1932	Lady with a Past	Guy Bryson	E. J. Babille	
1932	The Big Timer	Cooky Bradford	Edward Buzzell	
1932	Week Ends Only	Jack Williams	Alan Crosland	
1932	By Whose Hand?	Jimmy	Benjamin Stoloff	
1932	The Crooked Circle	Brand Osborne	H. Bruce Humberstone	
1932	Hat Check Girl	Buster Collins	Sidney Lanfield	
1933	Girl Missing	Henry Gibson	Robert Florey	
1933	I Cover the Waterfront	H. Joseph 'Joe' Miller	James Cruze	
1933	The Women in His Life	Roger McKane	George B. Seitz	
1934	I Spy	Wally Sawyer	Allan Dwan	
1934	Crimson Romance	Bob Wilson	David Howard	
1934	Lightning Strikes Twice	Steven 'Steve' Brewster	Ben Holmes	
1935	Together We Live	Max	Willard Mack	
1935	Navy Wife	Dr. Peter Milford	Allan Dwan	
1935	Frisco Waterfront	Glenn Burton	Arthur Lubin	
1936	Dancing Feet	Peyton Wells	Joseph Santley	
1936	Down to the Sea	Steve Londos	Lewis D. Collins	
1936	Treachery on the High Seas	Johnny Hammond	Emil-Edwin Reinert	
1938	Stardust	Royal Harley	Melville W. Brown	
1939	I Killed the Count	Bernard Froy	Frederic Zelnik	
1939	Confidential Lady	Jim Brent	Arthur B. Woods	Lost film
1941	Hi Gang!	Her Other Half	Marcel Varnel	
1942	This Was Paris	Butch, Sydney Chronicle Reporter	John Harlow	
1943	The Dark Tower	Phil Danton	John Harlow	
1954	Life with the Lyons	Himself	Val Guest	
1955	The Lyons in Paris	Ben	Val Guest	

== Bibliography ==
- Allgood, Jill (1975). Bebe and Ben. Robert Hale & Co. ISBN 0-709-14942-5.
- Daniels, Bebe; Lyons, Ben (1953). Life with the Lyons, the Autobiography of Bebe Daniels and Ben Lyon. Odhams Press. ASIN B0000CIGNZ.
