= Hi Gang! (radio series) =

BBC radio series (1940–1949)

Hi Gang! was a BBC radio series that ran from Sunday 26 May 1940 until 1949, featuring Vic Oliver, Ben Lyon and Bebe Daniels.

A sequel to this domestic sitcom, Life with the Lyons, debuted on BBC radio and television in November 1950.

== History ==
Hi Gang! was conceived as an idea by Ben Lyon at the beginning of World War II, when he and his wife Bebe Daniels were travelling around Britain appearing in entertainment shows at theatres, army camps and factories. They thought of asking the BBC for a light comedy programme, which would reach many more people at the same time, as part of the effort to raise morale. The idea was accepted by Pat Hillyard, head of BBC Light Entertainment. Vic Oliver agreed to join them. Most of the dialogue was written by Bebe, and she introduced a new song into the show every week. Music was provided by Jay Wilbur and his Orchestra. The show made fun of Hitler and the fascist Irish-German anti-British propagandist 'Lord Haw-Haw'.

The first broadcast of Hi Gang! was on 26 May 1940, coincident with the start of the Dunkirk evacuation. It ran weekly for one year, and until 1949. The production never left London, starting at Maida Vale Studios, moving to St. George's Hall and ending up at the underground Paris Theatre.

Stars such as Jack Buchanan, Sarah Churchill, Noël Coward, Florence Desmond, Geraldo, Carroll Gibbons, John Gielgud, Robertson Hare, Stanley Holloway, Michael Redgrave and Jack Warner appeared as guests in Hi Gang!. Ronald Reagan was a guest on the broadcast of 18 March 1949, when he stood in for Bill Stern.

== Bibliography ==
- Allgood, Jill Bebe and Ben, (1975) London, Robert Hale & Co. ISBN 0 7091 4942 5
