= Barbara Lyon =

American singer (1931–1995)

Background information
- Born: Barbara Bebe Lyon; September 9, 1931; Los Angeles, California, US
- Died: July 10, 1995 (aged 63) Hounslow, London, England, UK
- Genres: Traditional pop
- Years active: 1954–1960
- Label: Columbia

Barbara Bebe Bernadette Lyon (September 9, 1931 – July 10, 1995) was a singer of popular music and an actress. Although she was born in the United States, her career was mostly based in the United Kingdom.

== Life and career ==
Barbara Bebe Lyon was born in the Hollywood district of Los Angeles in 1931. Her parents, Ben Lyon and Bebe Daniels, were both Hollywood actors, beginning in silent films with careers extending into the 1930s. In the early part of World War II, Ben Lyon joined the Royal Air Force, and though the family returned later to the United States, they made Britain their adopted home. From 1950 to 1961 they had a radio programme on the BBC, Life With The Lyons. Ben, Bebe, Barbara, and Barbara's brother Richard all played themselves on this show (perhaps inspired by the success in the US of The Adventures of Ozzie and Harriet, also featuring a real-life family), bringing the family before the British public.

In the 1950s, both Barbara and Richard began their own independent careers; Richard recorded one single, but primarily found his career to be as an actor, both in the UK and the US. With Barbara, the situation was reversed: she did some acting, but found more popularity as a singer, with two hits in the UK Singles Chart. However, after those two hits she was unable to chart, and went into acting, both in the UK and U.S.

Lyon sang in her own TV series, Dreamtime With Barbara (1956). She married Russell Turner, the show's producer, at St. James' Church in London the following year. The couple divorced, and she married accountant Colin Birkett in 1968. They had one son, and later divorced.

== Death ==
Lyon died on July 10, 1995, of a cerebral hemorrhage at the age of 63.

== Charting singles ==
- "Stowaway" (1955) – Columbia – UK number 12
- "Letter to a Soldier" (1956) – Columbia – UK number 27
