= Bebe Daniels =

American actress, singer, dancer, writer, producer (1901–1971)

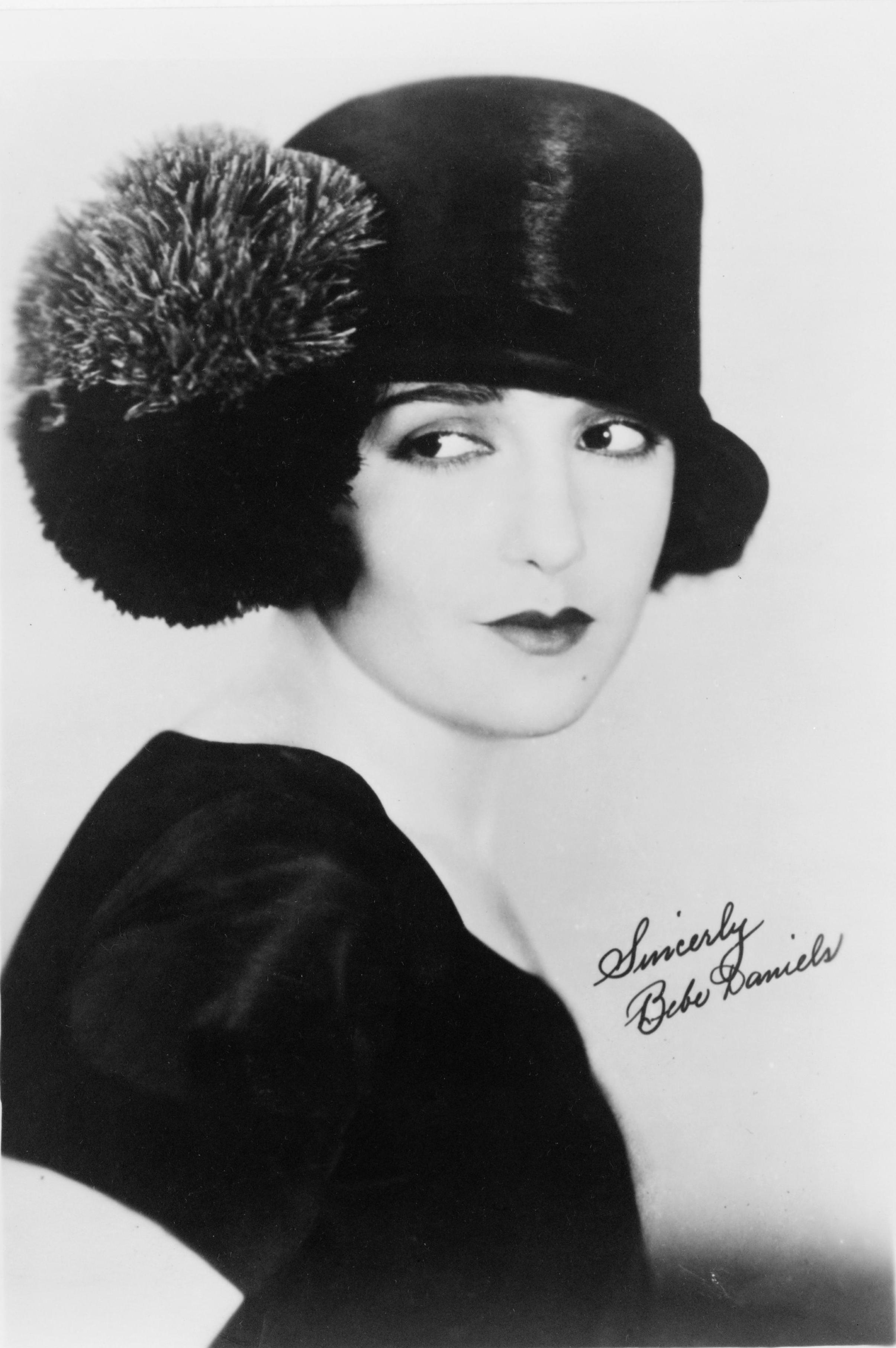
- Daniels in 1925
- Born: Phyllis Virginia Daniels; January 14, 1901; Dallas, Texas, U.S.
- Died: March 16, 1971 (aged 70); London, England
- Resting place: Hollywood Forever Cemetery
- Other name: Bebe Lyon
- Occupations: Actress; dancer; singer; producer; writer
- Years active: 1910–1961
- Spouse: Ben Lyon (m. 1930)
- Children: 2, including Barbara Lyon

Phyllis Virginia "Bebe" (/ˈbiːbiː/) Daniels (January 14, 1901 – March 16, 1971) was an American actress, singer, dancer, writer, and producer.

She began her career in Hollywood during the silent film era as a child actress, became a star in musicals such as Rio Rita (1929), and later gained fame on radio and television in Britain. Over the course of her 50-year career, Daniels appeared in 230 films.

== Early life and career ==
Daniels was born Phyllis Virginia Daniels (Bebe was a childhood nickname) in Dallas, Texas in 1901. Her father was a travelling theater manager, Scottish-born Melville Daniel MacNeal, who changed his name to Danny Daniels after a disagreement with his father over his ambition to change from the medical profession to show business. Her mother was Phyllis de Forest Griffin, born in Colombia of an American father and a Colombian mother, a stage actress who was in Danny's travelling stock company when their child was born. When she was ten weeks old, her father proudly carried her on stage when there was no part in the play for a baby.

The family moved to Los Angeles in her childhood, and she began her acting career at the age of 4 in the first version of Edwin Milton Royle's 1905 play The Squaw Man. The same year, she went on tour in a stage production of Shakespeare's Richard III. The following year, she participated in productions by Oliver Morosco and David Belasco.

By the age of 7, Daniels had her first starring role in film as the young heroine in A Common Enemy. At the age of 9, she starred as Dorothy Gale in the 1910 short film The Wonderful Wizard of Oz. At the age of 14, she was hired by comedy producer Hal Roach at $5 per day to star with Roach's star comedian Harold Lloyd in a series of one-reel comedies, starting with the 1915 film Giving Them Fits. Lloyd and Daniels eventually developed a romantic relationship that was well publicized; they were known in Hollywood as "The Boy" and "The Girl".

In 1919, she declined to renew her contract with Hal Roach because she wanted to be a dramatic actress. She accepted an offer from producer-director Cecil B. DeMille, who gave her secondary roles in Male and Female (1919), Why Change Your Wife? (1920), and The Affairs of Anatol (1921).

== Hollywood career ==
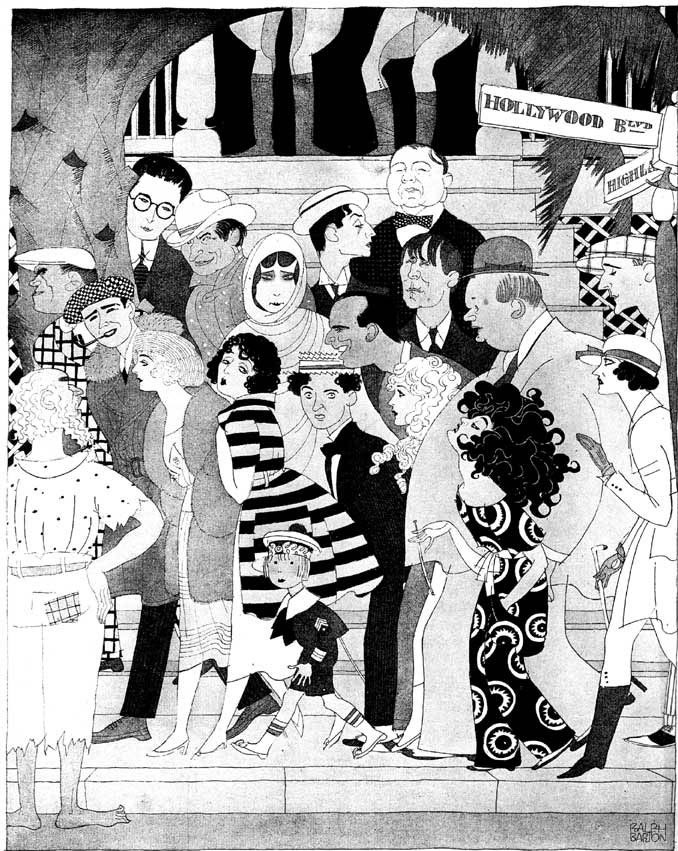
This 1922 Vanity Fair caricature by Ralph Barton shows the famous people who, he imagined, left work each day in Hollywood; use cursor to identify individual figures.

In the 1920s, Daniels was under contract with Paramount Pictures. She made the transition from child star to adult in Hollywood in 1922, and by 1924, she was acting with Rudolph Valentino in Monsieur Beaucaire. Following this movie, she was cast in a number of light popular films, namely Miss Bluebeard, The Manicure Girl, and Wild Wild Susan. Paramount dropped her contract with the advent of sound movies. Daniels was hired by the new studio Radio Pictures (later known as RKO Radio) to star in its first feature, the Technicolor musical Rio Rita, co-starring the comedy team of Bert Wheeler and Robert Woolsey. Rio Rita turned out not to be RKO's inaugural film due to production delays, but it was still one of the more successful films of that year. Bebe Daniels became established as a musical star, and RCA Victor hired her to record several records for its catalog.

Radio Pictures starred her in a number of musicals, including Dixiana (1930) and Love Comes Along (1930). Toward the end of 1930, Daniels appeared in the musical comedy Reaching for the Moon, released through United Artists. However, by this time, musicals had gone out of fashion, and most of the musical numbers from the film had to be removed before it could be released. Daniels had become associated with musicals, and Radio Pictures did not renew her contract. Warner Bros. realized she was a box-office draw, and she was offered a contract. During her years at Warner Bros., she starred in My Past (1931), Honor of the Family (1931), and the 1931 pre-code version of The Maltese Falcon. In 1932, she appeared in Silver Dollar (1932) and the successful Busby Berkeley choreographed musical comedy 42nd Street (1933) in which she sang. The same year, she played in Counsellor at Law. Her last film for Warner Bros. was Registered Nurse (1934).

== Stalking incidents ==
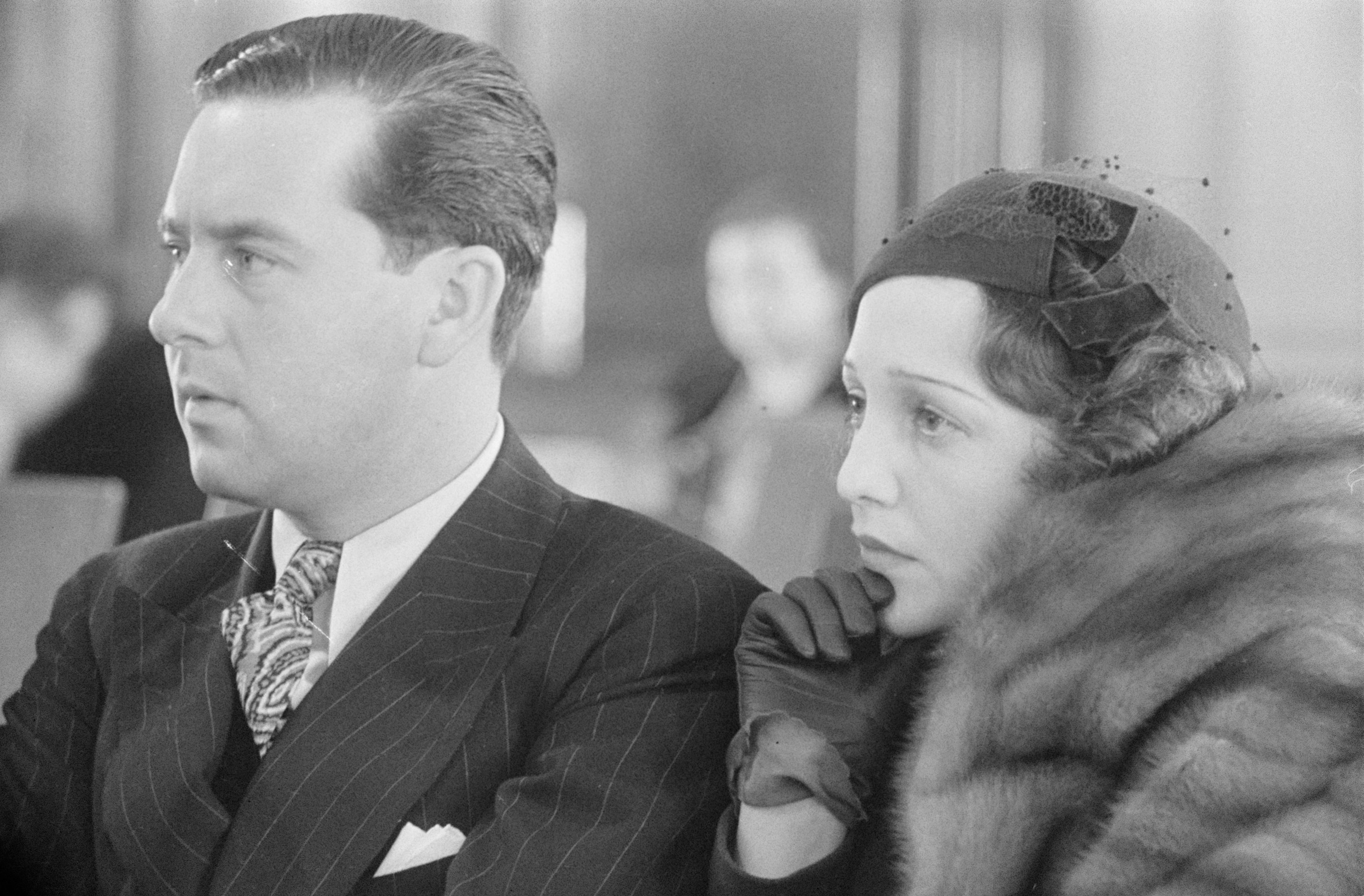
Daniels and Lyon during the trial of Albert Holland

In 1934, Daniels and husband Ben Lyon, whom she had married in June 1930, garnered press attention while having to testify against Albert F. Holland, a 36-year-old World War I veteran with a history of stalking Daniels. Holland had been under the delusion that he had attended school with Daniels and that they had married in Mexico in 1925. In 1931, he broke into Daniels' hotel room in San Francisco, confronting and terrifying her, and he had to be removed by security. He was arrested and committed to the Arizona State Asylum. Holland escaped from the institution in 1932, and he began sending more than 150 threatening letters to Daniels. Arrested again, he was placed in a psychiatric institution.

Following his release, another confrontation took place, and Holland was again arrested. A lengthy trial in Los Angeles took place, with Holland conducting most of his own defense, including a lengthy cross-examination of Daniels' husband Ben Lyon. The actress Doris Kenyon, a friend of Daniels and Lyon, testified for the prosecution. Ultimately, the jury found Holland to be mentally unfit, and he was committed to a psychiatric facility for an indefinite period. Daniels and Lyon then moved to London.

== Career in London and later ==
Daniels retired from Hollywood in 1935 with her husband, film actor Ben Lyon, and their two children, and moved to London. In February 1939, Daniels and Lyon co-starred in a series of commercial radio shows, the Rinso Radio Revue, recorded in London for Radio Luxembourg. They and Bebe's mother Phyllis all returned to the U.S. on 14 June 1939, leaving their children in Los Angeles in the care of Phyllis, and returned to London seven weeks later. After the start of World War II, they worked for the BBC, starring in the comedy radio series Hi Gang!. Born from an idea by Ben, and with most of the dialogue by Bebe, it enjoyed considerable popularity. A few years later, Daniels starred in the London production of Panama Hattie in the title role. The couple remained in England through the days of The Blitz.

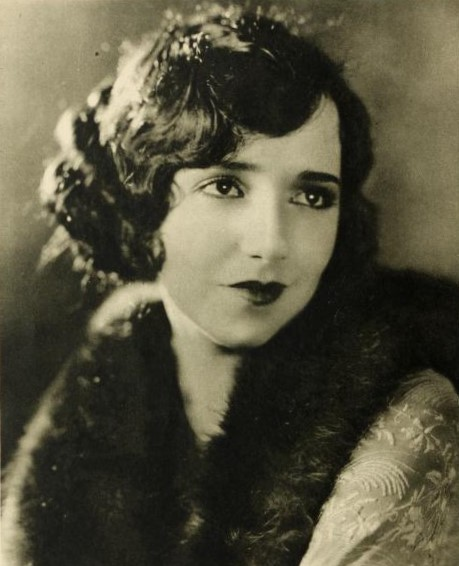
Publicity photo, circa 1924

Following the war, Daniels was awarded the Medal of Freedom by Harry S Truman for war service. In 1945, she returned to Hollywood for a short time to work as a film producer for Hal Roach and Eagle-Lion Films. She returned to the UK in 1948 and lived there for the remainder of her life. Daniels, her husband, her son Richard and her daughter Barbara all starred in the radio sitcom Life with the Lyons (1951 to 1961), which later made the transition to television.

She also appeared in an episode of Starlight as a singer. No episodes are known to survive.

== Personal life ==
Daniels married actor Ben Lyon in June 1930. They had two children: daughter Barbara in 1931 and a son Richard (born Bryan Moore in 1935), whom they adopted from a London orphanage. In an issue of the contemporary magazine Radio Pictorial, she explained how she saw Richard peering through the railings and instantly thought "A brother for Barbara".

Daniels suffered a severe stroke in 1963 and withdrew from public life. She suffered a second stroke in late 1970. On March 16, 1971, Daniels died of a cerebral hemorrhage in London at the age of 70. Daniels' death came only nine days after her former co-star Harold Lloyd died. Her remains were cremated at London's Golders Green Crematorium and the ashes returned to the United States; she was interred at the Chapel Columbarium at Hollywood Forever Cemetery. Upon his death in 1979, Ben Lyon's remains were interred next to Daniels'.

== Selected filmography ==
Short subjects
Release date	Title	Role	Notes
March 24, 1910	The Wonderful Wizard of Oz	Dorothy Gale	Role disputed as credits are lost
December 29, 1910	Justinian and Theodora		
December 21, 1911	A Counterfeit Santa Claus		
January 21, 1913	The Savage	Bit part	
January 22, 1914	Anne of the Golden Heart	Lucy Blake	Lost film
November 1, 1915	Giving Them Fits	Co-Worker	
November 8, 1915	Bughouse Bellhops		Lost film
December 15, 1915	Ruses, Rhymes and Roughnecks		Lost film
January 5, 1916	Lonesome Luke Leans to the Literary		Lost film
January 31, 1916	Luke, the Candy Cut-Up		
March 15, 1916	Luke Pipes the Pippins		Lost film
June 5, 1916	Luke Laughs Last		Lost film
December 3, 1916	Luke's Movie Muddle		
January 7, 1917	Luke's Lost Liberty		Lost film
January 21, 1917	Luke's Busy Day		Lost film
February 4, 1917	Luke's Trolley Troubles		Lost film
March 18, 1917	Lonesome Luke's Lively Life		
May 20, 1917	Lonesome Luke's Honeymoon		Lost film
August 5, 1917	Lonesome Luke, Messenger	The Girl	
September 30, 1917	By the Sad Sea Waves		
October 14, 1917	Bliss	The Girl	
October 28, 1917	Rainbow Island		
November 11, 1917	The Flirt		
November 25, 1917	All Aboard	The Girl	
April 28, 1918	Hey There!	The Leading Lady	
May 12, 1918	The Non-Stop Kid	Miss Wiggle	
May 19, 1918	Two-Gun Gussie	The Girl	
July 7, 1918	An Ozark Romance	Mountain Girl	
December 15, 1918	Take a Chance	The Hired Girl	
January 26, 1919	Going! Going! Gone!	Miss Goulash	
February 9, 1919	Ask Father	Switchboard operator	
March 30, 1919	Next Aisle Over	Miss Paprika	
April 6, 1919	A Sammy in Siberia	Olga	
May 4, 1919	Young Mr. Jazz	The Girl	
August 31, 1919	Don't Shove	Bebe	
November 2, 1919	Bumping into Broadway	The Girl	
September 24, 1924	Hello, 'Frisco	Herself	

Silent features
Year	Title	Role	Notes
1919	Male and Female	The King's Favourite	
1919	Everywoman	Vice	Lost film
1920	Why Change Your Wife?	Sally Clark	
1920	The Dancin' Fool	Junie Budd	
1920	Sick Abed	Nurse Durant	
1920	You Never Can Tell	Rowena Patricia Jones	
1920	The Fourteenth Man	Marjory Seaton	Lost film
1920	Oh, Lady, Lady	Mary Barber	Lost film
1920	She Couldn't Help It	Young Nance	Lost film
1921	Ducks and Drakes	Teddy Simpson	
1921	Two Weeks with Pay	Pansy O'Donnell/Marie La Tour	Lost film
1921	The March Hare	Lisbeth Ann Palmer	Lost film
1921	One Wild Week	Pauline Hathaway	Lost film
1921	The Affairs of Anatol	Satan Synne	
1921	The Speed Girl	Betty Lee	Lost film
1922	Nancy from Nowhere	Nancy	Lost film
1922	A Game Chicken	Inez Hastings	Lost film
1922	North of the Rio Grande	Val Hannon	Lost film
1922	Nice People	Theodora Gloucester	Lost film
1922	Pink Gods	Lorraine Temple	Lost film
1922	Singed Wings	Bonita della Guerda	Lost film
1923	The World's Applause	Corinne d'Alys	Lost film
1923	The Glimpses of the Moon	Susan Branch	Lost film
1923	The Exciters	Ronnie Rand	Lost film
1923	Hollywood	Herself (cameo)	Lost film
1923	His Children's Children	Diane	Lost film
1924	The Heritage of the Desert	Mescal	
1924	Daring Youth	Alita Allen	Lost film
1924	Unguarded Women	Breta Banning	Lost film
1924	Monsieur Beaucaire	Princess Henriette	
1924	Sinners in Heaven	Barbara Stockley	Lost film
1924	Dangerous Money	Adele Clark	Lost film
1924	Argentine Love	Consuelo Garcia	Lost film
1925	Miss Bluebeard	Colette Girard	
1925	The Crowded Hour	Peggy Laurence	Lost film
1925	The Manicure Girl	Maria Maretti	Lost film
1925	Wild, Wild Susan	Susan Van Dusen	Lost film
1925	Lovers in Quarantine	Diana	
1926	The Splendid Crime	Jenny	Lost film
1926	Miss Brewster's Millions	Polly Brewster	Lost film
1926	The Palm Beach Girl	Emily Bennett	Lost film
1926	Volcano!	Zabette de Chavalons	
1926	The Campus Flirt	Patricia Mansfield	Lost film
1926	Stranded in Paris	Julie McFadden	Lost film
1927	A Kiss in a Taxi	Ginette	Lost film
1927	Señorita	Señorita Francesca Hernandez	
1927	Swim Girl, Swim	Alice Smith	Lost film
1927	She's a Sheik	Zaida	
1928	Feel My Pulse	Barbara Manning	
1928	The Fifty-Fifty Girl	Kathleen O'Hara	Lost film
1928	Hot News	Pat Clancy	Lost film
1928	Take Me Home	Peggy Lane	Lost film
1928	What a Night!	Dorothy Winston	Lost film

Sound films and television
Year	Title	Role	Notes
1929	Rio Rita	Rita Ferguson	Incomplete film, the version available is an edited 1932 re-release
1930	Love Comes Along	Peggy	Incomplete film
1930	Alias French Gertie	Gertie Jones/aka Marie	
1930	Dixiana	Dixiana Caldwell	
1930	Lawful Larceny	Marion Dorsey	
1930	Reaching for the Moon	Vivien Benton	
1931	My Past	Miss Doree Macy	
1931	The Maltese Falcon	Ruth Wonderly	
1931	Honor of the Family	Laura	Lost film
1932	Silver Dollar	Lily Owens Martin	
1933	42nd Street	Dorothy Brock	
1933	Cocktail Hour	Cynthia Warren	
1933	Counsellor at Law	Regina "Rexy" Gordon	
1933	The Song You Gave Me	Mitzi Hansen	
1933	A Southern Maid	Juanita/Dolores	
1934	Registered Nurse	Sylvia 'Ben' Benton	
1935	Music Is Magic	Diane De Valle	
1936	Treachery on the High Seas	May Hardy	Alternative title: Not Wanted on Voyage
1938	The Return of Carol Deane	Carol Deane	
1941	Hi Gang!	The Liberty Girl	
1947	The Fabulous Joe	-	Producer
1954	Life with the Lyons	Bebe Lyon	Alternative title: Family Affair
1954	This is Your Life	Herself	
1955	The Lyons in Paris	Bebe	Alternative titles: Mr. and Mrs. in Paree; The Lyons Abroad
1955–1960	Life with the Lyons	Bebe Lyon	Unknown episodes producer, writer

== Selected radio performances ==
Year	Title	Role	Notes
1939	Rinso Radio Revue	Bebe Daniels	Radio Luxembourg, with Ben Lyon, Tommy Handley and others
1941–1949	Hi Gang!	Bebe Lyon	BBC, with Ben, Barbara and Richard Lyon and Vic Oliver
1950–1961	Life with the Lyons	Bebe Lyon	BBC, with Ben, Barbara and Richard Lyon

== Bibliography ==
- Allgood, Jill (1975). Bebe and Ben. Robert Hale & Co. ISBN 978-0-709-14942-2.
- Daniels, Bebe; Allgood, Jill (1950). 282 ways of making a salad with favorite recipes by British and American personalities and stars. Cassell & Co. OCLC 13066530.
- Daniels, Bebe; Lyons, Ben (1953). Life with the Lyons, the Autobiography of Bebe Daniels and Ben Lyon. Odhams Press. ASIN B0000CIGNZ.
- Epting, Charles L. (2016). Bebe Daniels:Hollywood's Good Little Bad Girl. Jefferson, North Carolina: McFarland & Co Inc. ISBN 978-1476663746.
