= Barbara Stanwyck on stage, screen, radio, and television =

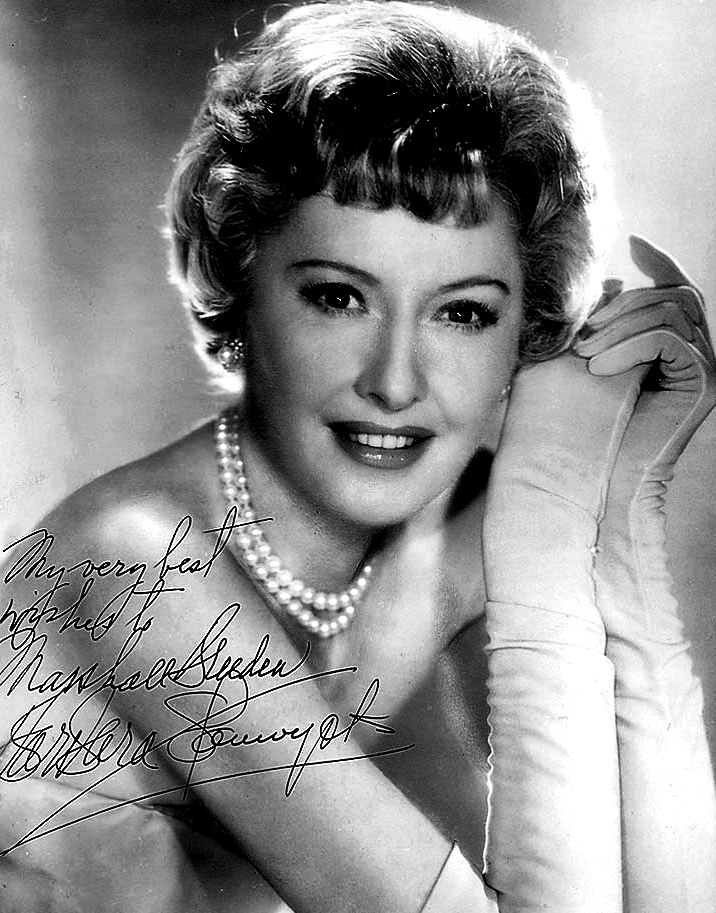
Barbara Stanwyck (1950)

Barbara Stanwyck (born Ruby Catherine Stevens, 1907–1990) was a prolific American actress and dancer who appeared in a total of 95 theatrically released full-length motion pictures. Orphaned before she was old enough to attend school, she became fascinated by the burgeoning film industry, and actress Pearl White in particular, whom she would mimic on the playgrounds. "Pearl White was my goddess, and her courage, her grace, and her triumphs lifted me out of this world."

She began her show business career as a teenage chorus girl in speakeasy nightclubs where the liquor prohibition laws were ignored, and the clientele were often mafia gangsters. At age of 15, she danced in the El Fey Nightclub in Manhattan, operated by Texas Guinan, whose establishments showcased aspiring talent such as dancers George Raft and Ruby Keeler. Biographer Dan Callahan opined that the same tough fortitude it took for a teenager to survive those experiences, was played out in the on-screen persona of her interpretation of determined and often hard-edged women.

By age of 16, she was performing in the more mainstream-acceptable Ziegfeld Follies. It was during this period that she became acquainted with playwright Willard Mack, who gave her a role in his stage production The Noose, and re-named her after actress Jane Stanwyck. During her run in the play Burlesque, her first leading role, she also appeared in advertisements for personal exercise equipment.

Stanwyck got an uncredited bit part in the silent lost film Broadway Nights (1927). Studio executive Joseph M. Schenck subsequently signed her for The Locked Door (1929) with Rod La Rocque. Afterwards, she had a role in Mexicali Rose (1929) for Columbia Pictures. Stanwyck got her major break when director Frank Capra chose her for the lead role in his romantic drama Ladies of Leisure (1930). She would go on to make four more films with Capra: The Miracle Woman (1931), Forbidden (1932), The Bitter Tea of General Yen (1933), and Meet John Doe (1941). She also did five films with director William A. Wellman: Night Nurse (1931), The Purchase Price (1932), So Big! (1932), The Great Man's Lady (1942), and Lady of Burlesque (1943). She starred in the 1947 film, The Two Mrs. Carrolls, with Humphrey Bogart (directed by Peter Godfrey). Stanwyck was nominated four times for the Academy Award for Best Actress, but never won. In 1982, she was given an honorary Academy Award.

On August 3, 1936, Stanwyck made the first of her 16 appearances on LUX Radio Theatre, hosted by director-producer Cecil B. DeMille. Her final performance with the radio series was in 1943. She had a decades-long social relationship with actress and comedian Mary Livingstone and her husband Jack Benny, appearing on his radio show numerous times, and making her television debut on his show. In the 1950s, Stanwyck began to branch out into television. She received the 1961 Primetime Emmy Award for Outstanding Lead Actress – Drama Series for The Barbara Stanwyck Show anthology series. She was nominated for the same award three more times – 1966, 1967, and 1968 – for her series The Big Valley, winning it for that series in 1966.

Stanwyck received a star on the Hollywood Walk of Fame on February 8, 1960.

== Stage ==
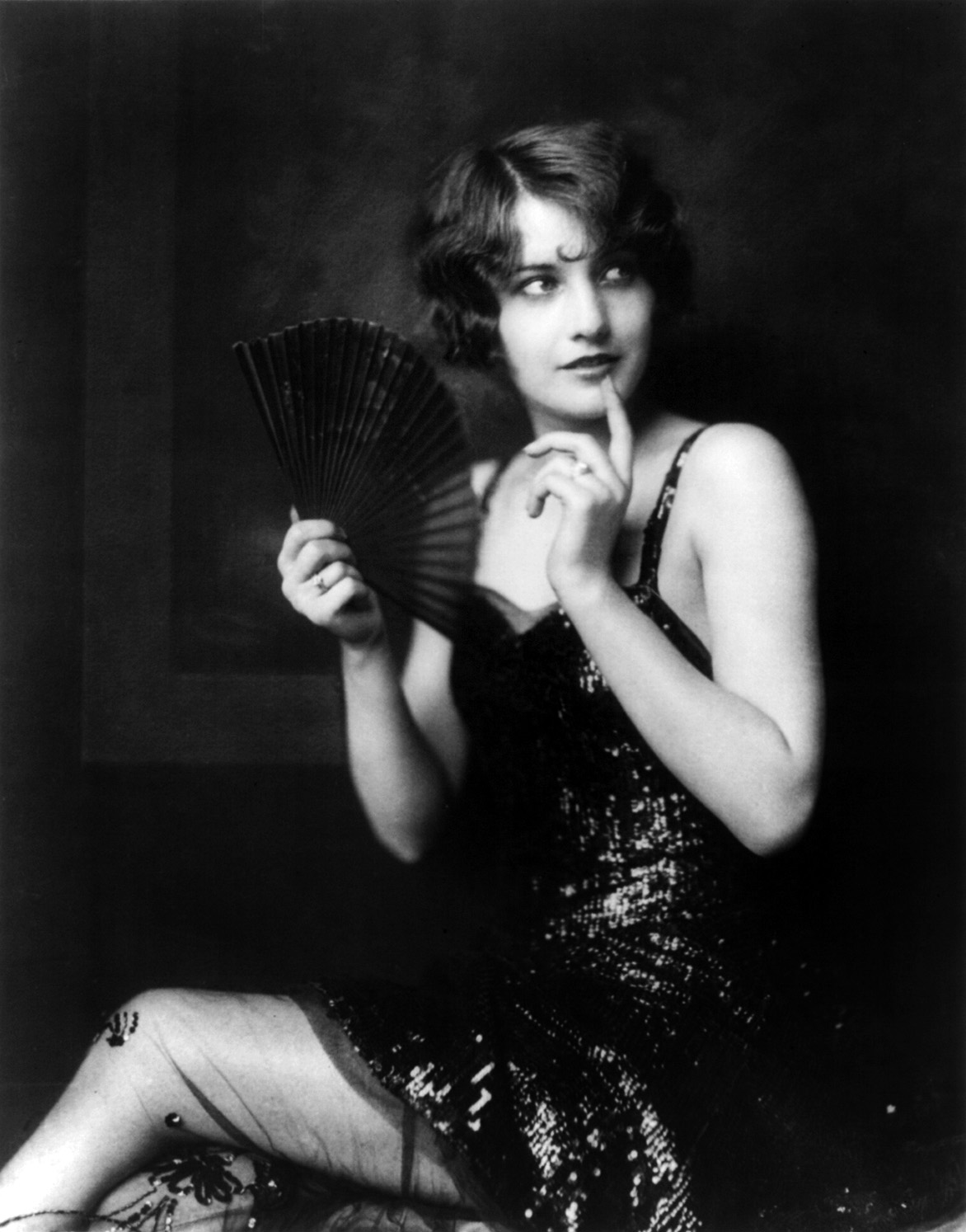
Stanwyck as a Ziegfeld girl, c. 1924

Broadway stage credits
Title	Date	Role	Notes	Ref(s)
Keep Kool	May 22 – Sept 27, 1924	Billed as Ruby Stevens	148 performances	
The Noose	Oct 20, 1926 – Apr 1927	First billing as Barbara Stanwyck	197 performances	
Burlesque	Sept 1 1927 – July 14, 1928	Bonny	372 performances, adapted into the movie The Dance of Life	
Tattle Tales	June 1–24, 1933	Herself and Kay Arnold	28 performances	

== Screen ==
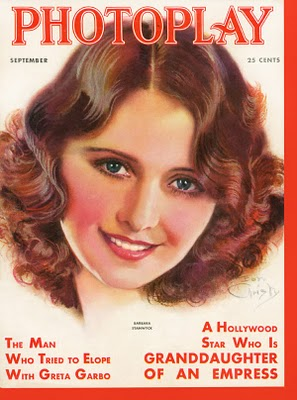
Stanwyck on the cover of the September 1931 Photoplay magazine

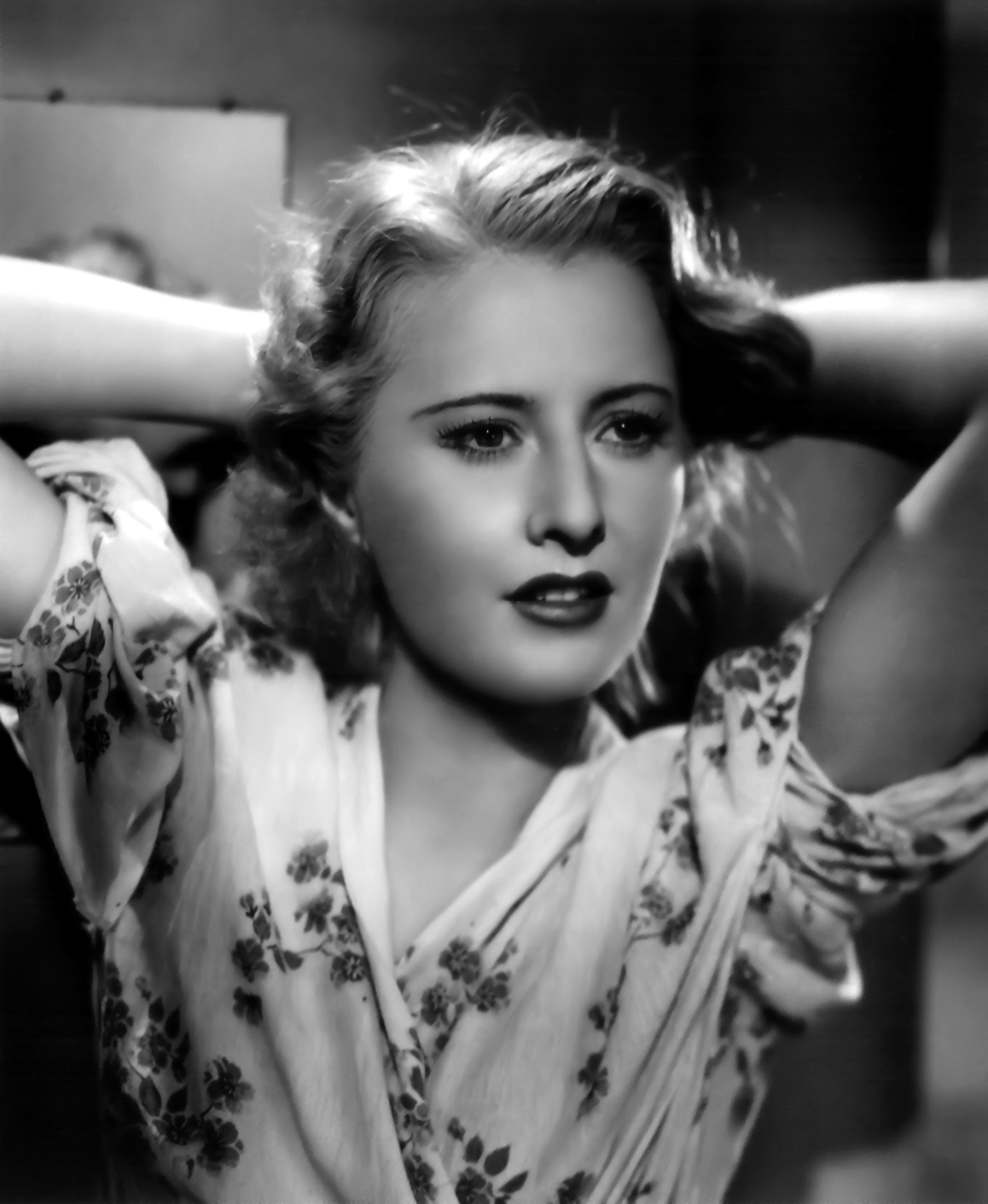
Stanwyck in Stella Dallas (1937)

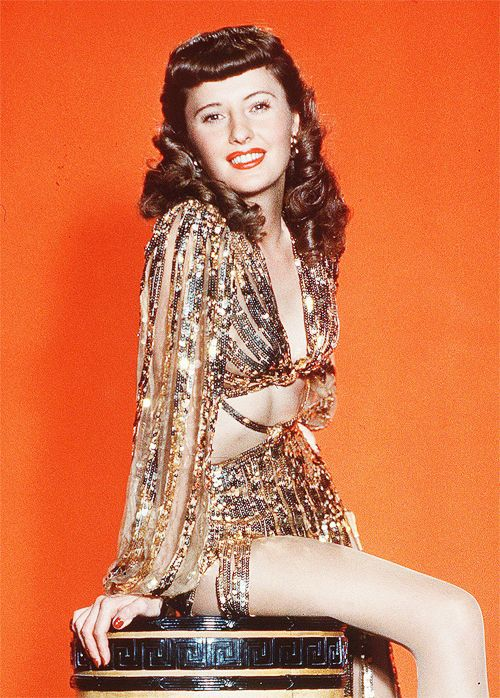
Barbara Stanwyck in Ball of Fire (1941)

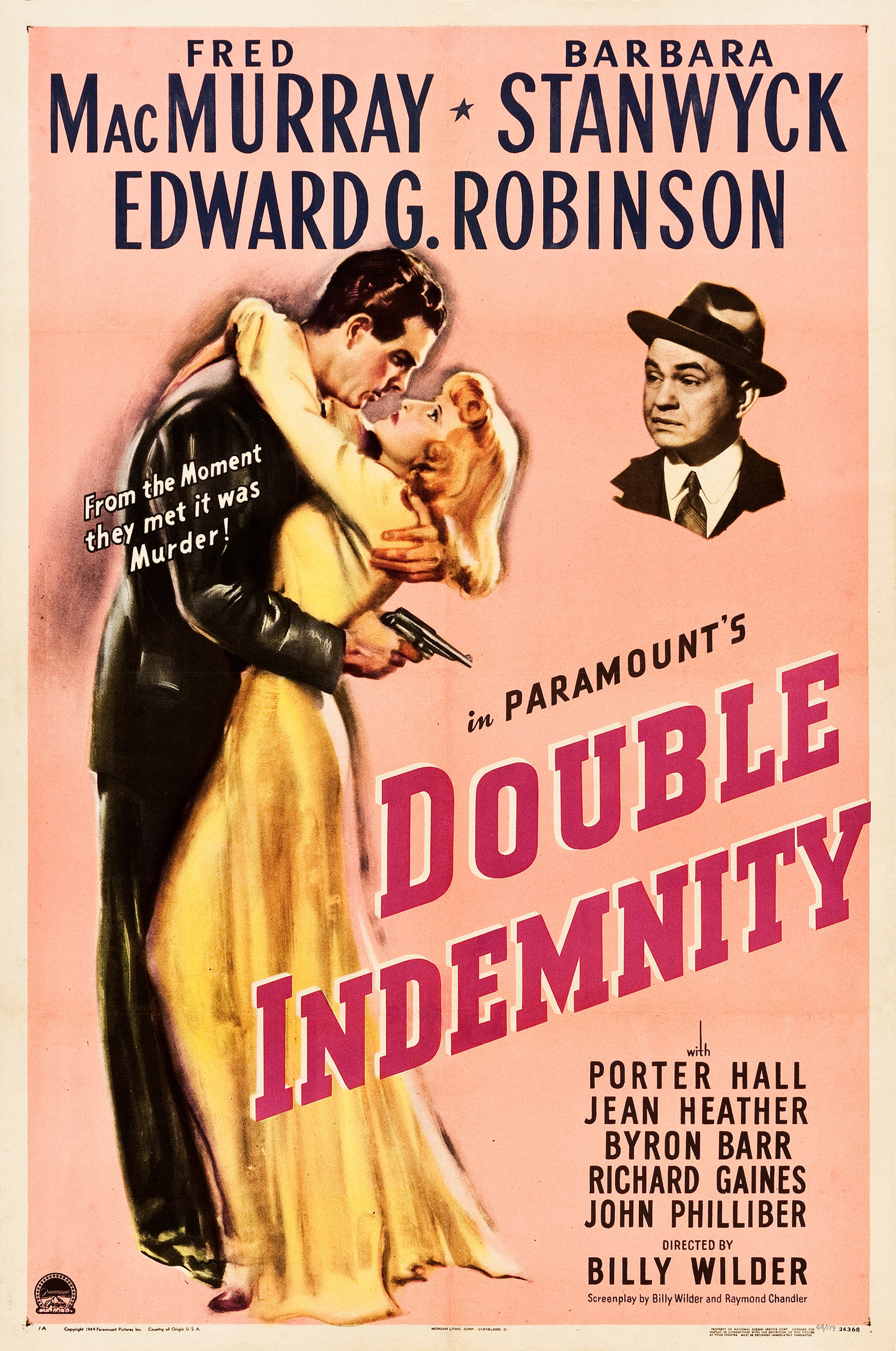
Lobby poster of Fred MacMurray, Stanwyck, and Edward G. Robinson in Double Indemnity (1944)

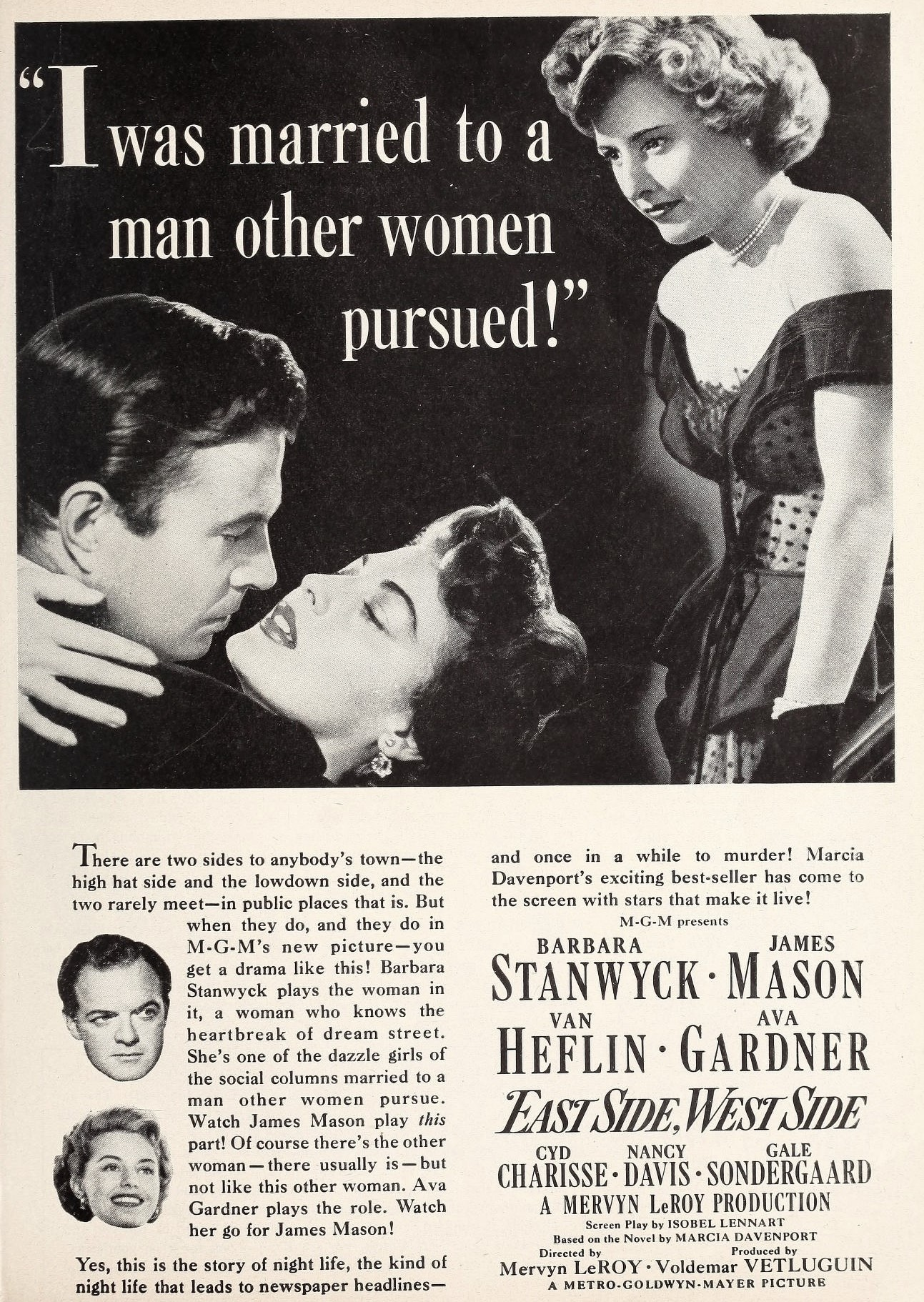
James Mason, Ava Gardner, and Stanwyck in East Side, West Side advertisement in Modern Screen magazine (1949)

Screen credits
Title	Year	Role	Notes	Ref(s)
Broadway Nights	1927	Fan dancer (uncredited)	Robert Kane Productions; Film debut and only silent film; a lost film	
The Locked Door	1929	Ann Carter	Feature Productions, Inc.	
Mexicali Rose	1929	Mexicali Rose	Columbia Pictures; Her first starring role	
Ladies of Leisure	1930	Kay Arnold	Columbia Pictures; First film with Frank Capra	
Illicit	1931	Anne Vincent Ives	Warner Bros.	
Ten Cents a Dance	1931	Barbara O'Neill	Columbia Pictures	
The Stolen Jools	1931	Herself	National Variety Artists; Preserved at the UCLA Film & Television Archive	
Night Nurse	1931	Lora Hart	Warner Bros. First film with William Wellman	
The Miracle Woman	1931	Florence "Faith" Fallon	Columbia Pictures	
Forbidden	1932	Lulu Smith	Columbia Pictures	
Shopworn	1932	Kitty Lane	Columbia Pictures	
So Big!	1932	Selina Peake De Jong	Warner Bros.	
The Purchase Price	1932	Joan Gordon, aka Francine La Rue	Warner Bros.	
The Bitter Tea of General Yen	1933	Megan Davis	Columbia Pictures	
Ladies They Talk About	1933	Nan Taylor, Alias of Nan Ellis, aka Mrs. Andrews	Warner Bros.	
Baby Face	1933	Lily Powers	Warner Bros.	
Ever in My Heart	1933	Mary Archer Wilbrandt	Warner Bros.	
Gambling Lady	1934	Jennifer, Lady Lee	Warner Bros.	
A Lost Lady	1934	Marian Ormsby Forrester	Warner Bros.	
The Secret Bride	1934	Ruth Vincent	Warner Bros.	
The Woman in Red	1935	Shelby Barret Wyatt	Warner Bros.	
Red Salute	1935	Drue Van Allen	Reliance Pictures/United Artists	
Annie Oakley	1935	Annie Oakley	RKO Pictures	
A Message to Garcia	1936	Raphaelita Maderos	20th Century Fox	
The Bride Walks Out	1936	Carolyn Martin	RKO Pictures	
His Brother's Wife	1936	Rita Wilson Claybourne	Metro-Goldwyn-Mayer (MGM)	
Banjo on My Knee	1936	Pearl Elliott Holley	20th Century Fox	
The Plough and the Stars	1936	Nora Clitheroe	RKO Pictures	
Internes Can't Take Money	1937	Janet Haley	Paramount	
This Is My Affair	1937	Lil Duryea	20th Century Fox	
Stella Dallas	1937	Stella Martin "Stell" Dallas	Nominated – Academy Award for Best Actress; Samuel Goldwyn/United Artists	
Breakfast for Two	1937	Valentine "Val" Ransome	RKO Pictures	
Always Goodbye	1937	Margot Weston	20th Century Fox	
The Mad Miss Manton	1938	Melsa Manton	RKO Pictures	
Union Pacific	1939	Mollie Monahan	Paramount	
Golden Boy	1939	Lorna Moon	Columbia Pictures	
Remember the Night	1940	Lee Leander	Paramount	
The Lady Eve	1941	Jean Harrington	Paramount	
Meet John Doe	1941	Ann Mitchell	Warner Bros.	
You Belong to Me	1941	Dr. Helen Hunt	Columbia Pictures	
Ball of Fire	1941	Katherine "Sugarpuss" O'Shea	Nominated – Academy Award for Best Actress; Samuel Goldwyn/RKO Pictures	
The Great Man's Lady	1942	Hannah Sempler	Paramount	
The Gay Sisters	1942	Fiona Gaylord	Warner Bros.	
Lady of Burlesque	1943	Deborah Hoople, aka Dixie Daisy	Hunt Stromberg/United Artists	
Flesh and Fantasy	1943	Joan Stanley	Universal	
Double Indemnity	1944	Phyllis Dietrichson	Nominated – Academy Award for Best Actress; Paramount	
Hollywood Canteen	1944	Herself	Warner Bros.	
Christmas in Connecticut	1945	Elizabeth Lane	Warner Bros.	
Hollywood Victory Caravan	1945	Herself	Paramount; United States Department of the Treasury	
My Reputation	1946	Jessica Drummond	Warner Bros. Filmed in 1944	
The Bride Wore Boots	1946	Sally Warren	Paramount; Her last feature comedy	
The Strange Love of Martha Ivers	1946	Martha Ivers	Paramount	
California	1947	Lily Bishop	Paramount; Her first color film	
The Two Mrs. Carrolls	1947	Sally Morton Carroll	Warner Bros.	
The Other Love	1947	Karen Duncan	Enterprise Productions/United Artists	
Cry Wolf	1947	Sandra Marshall	Warner Bros.	
Variety Girl	1947	Herself	Paramount	
B.F.'s Daughter	1948	Pauline "Polly" Fulton Brett	MGM	
Sorry, Wrong Number	1948	Leona Stevenson	Nominated – Academy Award for Best Actress; Hal Wallis Productions/Paramount	
The Lady Gambles	1949	Joan Boothe	Universal	
East Side, West Side	1949	Jessie Bourne	MGM	
The File on Thelma Jordon	1950	Thelma Jordon	Paramount	
No Man of Her Own	1950	Helen Ferguson / Patrice Harkness	Paramount	
The Furies	1950	Vance Jeffords	Paramount	
To Please a Lady	1950	Regina Forbes	MGM	
The Man with a Cloak	1951	Lorna Bounty	MGM	
Clash by Night	1952	Mae Doyle D'Amato	RKO Pictures	
Jeopardy	1953	Helen Stilwin	MGM	
Titanic	1953	Julia Sturges	20th Century Fox	
All I Desire	1953	Naomi Murdoch	Universal	
Blowing Wild	1953	Marina Conway	Warner Bros.	
The Moonlighter	1953	Rela	Warner Bros. Filmed in 3D	
Witness to Murder	1954	Cheryl Draper	Chester Erskine/United Artists	
Executive Suite	1954	Julia O. Tredway	MGM	
Cattle Queen of Montana	1954	Sierra Nevada Jones	Filmcrest Productions/RKO Pictures	
The Violent Men	1955	Martha Wilkison	Columbia Pictures	
Escape to Burma	1955	Gwen Moore	Filmcrest Productions/RKO Pictures	
There's Always Tomorrow	1956	Norma Miller Vale	Universal	
The Maverick Queen	1956	Kit Banion	Republic	
These Wilder Years	1956	Ann Dempster	MGM	
Crime of Passion	1957	Kathy Ferguson Doyle	Robert Goldstein Productions/United Artists	
Trooper Hook	1957	Cora Sutliff	Filmaster Productions/United Artists	
Forty Guns	1957	Jessica Drummond	20th Century Fox	
Walk on the Wild Side	1962	Jo Courtney	Columbia Pictures	
Roustabout	1964	Maggie Morgan	Hal Wallis Productions/Paramount	
The Night Walker	1964	Irene Trent	William Castle/Universal	

=== Academy Awards ===
Stanwyck was nominated for the Best Actress Academy Award four times. She never won, but received an honorary award in 1982, "for superlative creativity and unique contribution to the art of screen acting".

Of course I was disappointed those times I was nominated before and lost. Anyone who says they're not is lying. I'd like to do more as an actress, and better. It might be in a wheelchair, but what the hell.

— Barbara Stanwyck, backstage after receiving an honorary Academy Award Oscar on March 29, 1982,

Stanwyck's nominations, and the winner for each year in **bold face text** against a	yellow	background:

**1937**		**1941**		**1944**		**1948**	
Actress	Film	Actress	Film	Actress	Film	Actress	Film
Irene Dunne	The Awful Truth	Bette Davis	The Little Foxes	**Ingrid Bergman**	**Gaslight**	Ingrid Bergman	Joan of Arc
Greta Garbo	Camille	**Joan Fontaine**	**Suspicion**	Claudette Colbert	Since You Went Away	Irene Dunne	I Remember Mama
Janet Gaynor	A Star Is Born	Greer Garson	Blossoms in the Dust	Bette Davis	Mr. Skeffington	Olivia de Havilland	The Snake Pit
**Luise Rainer**	**The Good Earth**	Olivia de Havilland	Hold Back the Dawn	Greer Garson	Mrs. Parkington	Barbara Stanwyck	Sorry, Wrong Number
Barbara Stanwyck	Stella Dallas	Barbara Stanwyck	Ball of Fire	Barbara Stanwyck	Double Indemnity	**Jane Wyman**	**Johnny Belinda**

== Radio ==
=== Lux Radio Theatre ===
Stanwyck made 16 appearances on LUX Radio Theatre hosted by Cecil B. DeMille, from August 3, 1936 through 1943. She appeared in the following episodes:

- "Main Street"
- "Stella Dallas"
- "These Three"
- "Dark Victory"
- "Morning Glory"
- "So Big"
- "Wuthering Heights"
- "Only Yesterday"
- "Remember The Night"
- "Smilin' Through"
- "The Lady Eve"
- "Penny Serenade"
- "Ball of Fire"
- "This Above All"
- "The Gay Sisters"
- "The Great Man's Lady"

=== Jack Benny's radio and television programs ===
Stanwyck and her husband Robert Taylor were part of the inner social circle of Mary Livingstone and Jack Benny. She often appeared on Benny's radio program, sometimes in a parody of her own movies, and made her television debut on The Jack Benny Program weekly television show in 1952. The following is a sample listing of episodes in which she appeared with Benny.

==== Radio ====
- "Golden Boy" (January 7, 1940)
- "Dennis Wants a Raise" (November 28, 1943)
- "Dennis Dreams He Has a Radio Program" (March 19, 1944)
- "Jack Takes Two Cadets to Barbara Stanwyck's House" (October 1, 1942)
- "Sorry, Wrong Number" (October 17, 1948)
- "Dennis Dreams He's a Star" (April 10, 1949)

==== TV ====
- Episode – "Gas Light" – January 27, 1952; episode repeated January 11, 1959

== Television ==
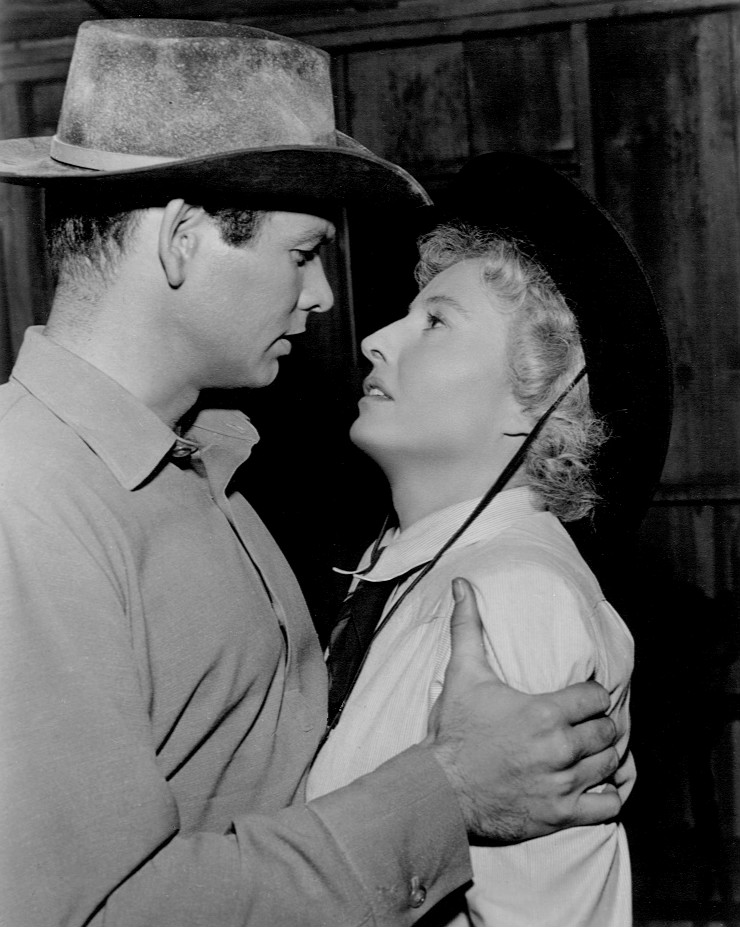
David Janssen and Stanwyck from Zane Grey Theatre (1958)

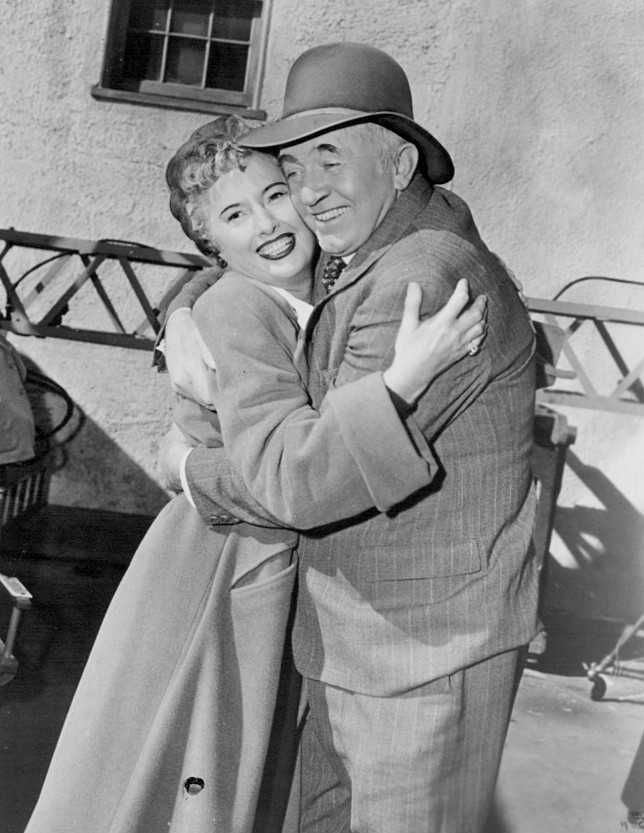
Stanwyck with Walter Brennan from The Real McCoys (1959)

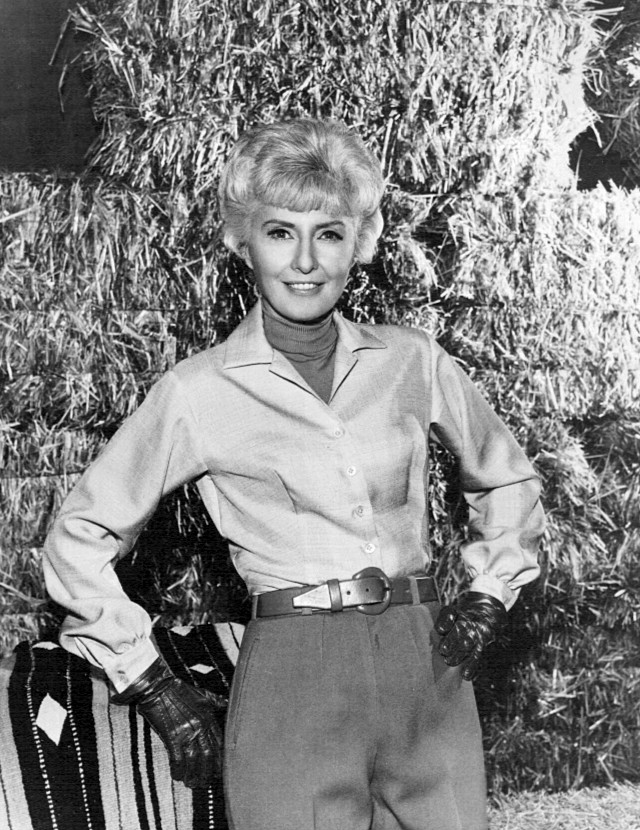
Stanwyck publicity photo from The Big Valley (1968)

Television credits of Barbara Stanwyck
Title	Year/date	Role	Notes	Ref(s)
The Jack Benny Program	1952	Paula Alquist	"Gaslight"	
The Christophers	1952	Guest Hostess	"Sentence Deferred" and "Two Worlds of Ann Foster"	
The Loretta Young Show	1955	Guest Hostess	"My Uncle O'Moore" and "The Waiting Game"	
Ford Theatre	1956	Irene Frazier	"Sudden Silence"	
Goodyear Theatre	1958	Midge Varney	"Three Dark Years"	
Zane Grey Theatre	1958–1959	Various characters	"The Freighter", "Trail to Nowhere", "Hang the Heart High" and "The Lone Woman"	
The Real McCoys	1959	Herself	"The McCoys Visit Hollywood"	
The Barbara Stanwyck Show	1960–1961	Hostess, various characters	Lead role (36 episodes); 1961 Primetime Emmy Award for Outstanding Lead Actress – Drama Series	
Wagon Train	1961	Maud Frazer	"The Maud Frazer Story"	
General Electric Theater	1961	Lili Parrish	"Star Witness: The Lili Parrish Story"	
The Joey Bishop Show	1961	Dora	"A Windfall for Mom"	
Wagon Train	1962	Caroline Casteel	"The Caroline Casteel Story"	
The Dick Powell Show	1962	Irene Phillips	"Special Assignment"	
Rawhide	1962	Nora Holloway	"The Captain's Wife"	
The Untouchables	1962–1963	Lt. Agatha "Aggie" Stewart	"Elegy" and "Search for a Dead Man"	
Wagon Train	1963–1964	Kate Crawley	"The Molly Kincaid Story" and "The Kate Crawley Story"	
Calhoun: County Agent	1964	Abby Rayner	Unaired pilot	
The Big Valley	1965–1969	Victoria Barkley	Lead role (112 episodes); 1966 Primetime Emmy Award for Outstanding Lead Actress – Drama Series; Nominated – 1967 and 1968 Primetime Emmy Award for Outstanding Lead Actress – Drama Series	
The House That Would Not Die	1970	Ruth Bennett	Television film	
A Taste of Evil	1971	Miriam Jennings	Television film	
The Letters	1973	Geraldine Parkington	Television film	
Charlie's Angels	1980	Antonia "Toni" Blake	"Toni's Boys" served as a backdoor pilot, but was not picked up by the network.	
The Thorn Birds	1983	Mary Carson	Television miniseries Golden Globe Award for Best Supporting Actress – Series, Miniseries or Television Film; Primetime Emmy Award for Outstanding Lead Actress – Miniseries or a Movie	
Dynasty	1985	Constance Colby Patterson	"The Californians", "The Man", "The Titans: Part 1" and "The Titans: Part 2"	
The Colbys	1985–1986	Constance Colby Patterson	Main cast (24 episodes)	

== Bibliography ==
- Callahan, Dan (2012). "Filmography". Barbara Stanwyck : The Miracle Woman. Jackson: University Press of Mississippi. ISBN 978-1-61703-184-7. (subscription required)
- Madsen, Axel (1994). Stanwyck. New York City, NY: HarperCollins. ISBN 0-06-017997-X.
- Smith, Ella (1974). Starring Miss Barbara Stanwyck. New York, Crown Publishers. ISBN 978-0-517-50602-8.
- Wilson, Victoria (2013). A life of Barbara Stanwyck (First Simon & Schuster ed.). New York. ISBN 978-1-4391-9998-5.
