= Madame Peacock =

1920 film

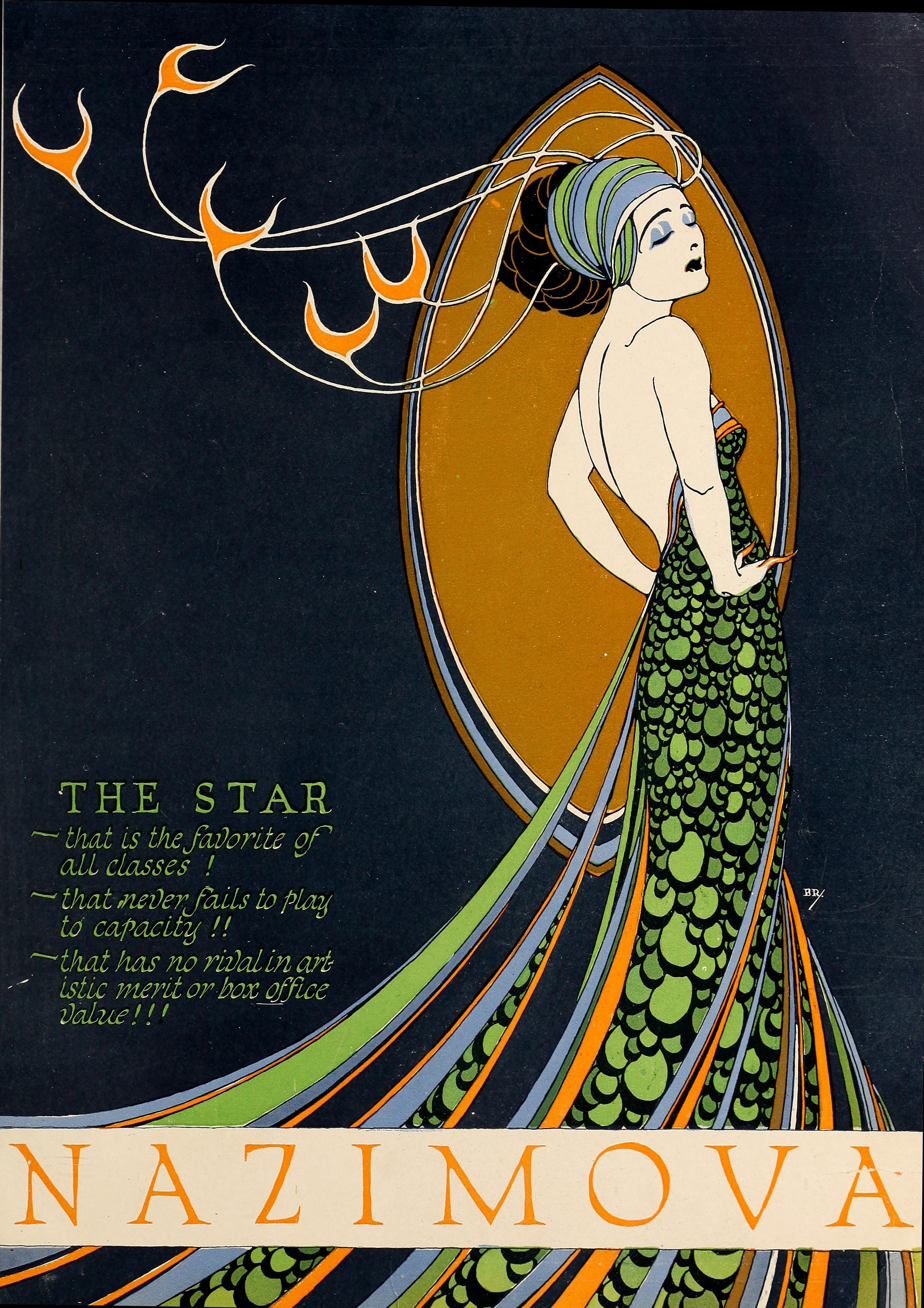
- Advertisement
- Directed by: Ray C. Smallwood
- Written by: Alla Nazimova (scenario & intertitles)
- Based on: Footlights by Rita Weiman
- Produced by: Alla Nazimova
- Starring: Alla Nazimova
- Cinematography: Rudolph Bergquist
- Production company: Nazimova Productions
- Distributed by: Metro Pictures
- Release date: October 4, 1920
- Running time: 6 reels (5,423 feet)
- Country: United States
- Language: Silent (English intertitles)

Madame Peacock is a 1920 American silent drama film written, produced by, and starring Alla Nazimova in a dual role. Distributed by Metro Pictures, copies of the film exist in several collections including the Cinematheque Royale de Belgique, Brussels.

== Plot ==
As described in a film magazine, the idol of New York City's theater going public Jane Goring (Nazimova), after returning to her apartment after the run of Madame Peacock, finds not the newspaper man she thought was going to interview her but instead her husband Robert McNaughton (Probert) who is wracked with a cough. Living the life of sham, she thrusts him aside, forgetting to even ask about her daughter. As he leaves he tells her that someday she will need friends and love only to find that she has thrown them all away for sham. Four years later, at the height of her career, Jane prepares to appear in a new piece. Cold, cruel, uncompromising, thoughtless, she keeps the theater company waiting for hours, and then proceeds to break the heart of the playwright, humiliate her fellow players, and exasperate her manager beyond all endurance. In the company is Gloria Cromwell (Nazimova), the antithesis of Jane Goring. She tells the star her pleasure in being in her company. Eventually the play opens, and after the final curtain the audience shouts for Gloria Cromwell, Jane is obliged to relinquish the stage to her. Jane returns to her dressing room and flies into a rage, telling her manager Rudolph Cleeberg (Steppling) that either she or Gloria must go. Cleeburg allows Gloria to depart and when she reaches home she realizes how her selfishness has lost her husband, daughter, and now her success. While she is recalling these events Robert McNaughton accompanies Gloria Cromwell into Jane's apartment. There Jane's mother recognizes Gloria, and she is sent to Jane who, looking into the eyes of her own daughter, is purified in the moment of sorrow and joy.

== Cast ==
- Alla Nazimova as Jane Goring/Gloria Cromwell
- George Probert as Robert McNaughton
- John Steppling as Rudolph Cleeberg
- William Orlamond as Lewis
- Rex Cherryman as Thorne
- Albert R. Cody as Harrison Burke
- Gertrude Claire as Character Lady
- Georgia Woodthorpe as Mrs. Goring
