= Sam Hardy (actor) =

American actor (1883–1935)

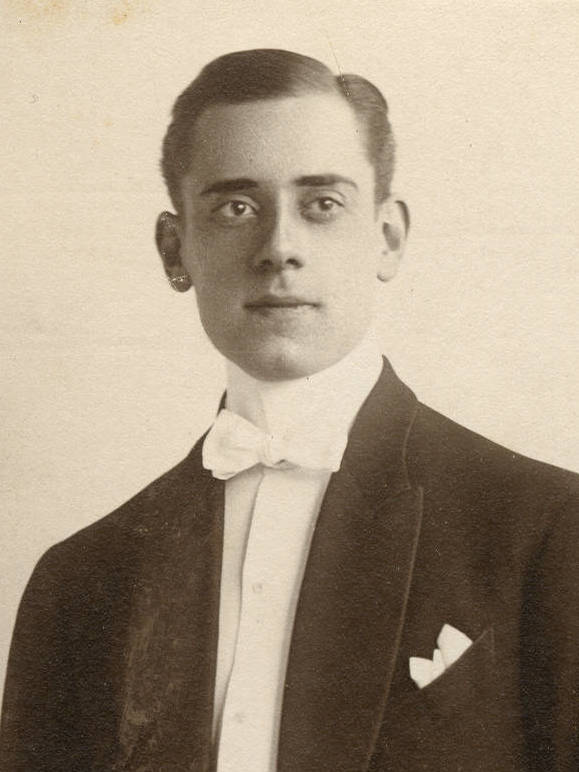
- Born: March 21, 1883; New Haven, Connecticut, U.S.
- Died: October 16, 1935 (aged 52); Los Angeles, California, U.S.
- Occupation: Actor
- Years active: 1915–1935
- Spouse: Betty Scott

Samuel B. Hardy (March 21, 1883 – October 16, 1935) was an American stage and film actor who appeared in feature films during the silent and early sound eras.

Born in New Haven, Connecticut, Hardy attended Yale but left there to become an actor on stage. He entered the world of film with Biograph Studios. Hardy appeared in about 85 movies between 1915 and 1935, he was often in comedic roles. His best-known role to modern audiences is perhaps Charles Weston, the theatrical agent, in the 1933 film classic King Kong.

Hardy appeared opposite Marie Cahill in the 1910 play Judy Forgot and the 1915 film adaptation. He raised funds for Harold Lloyd's venture with others, the Beverly Hills Little Theatre for Professionals.

Hardy became ill while he was working in the film Strike Me Pink starring Eddie Cantor. He did not survive emergency surgery at a hospital and died of intestinal problems.

== Partial filmography ==
- Judy Forgot (1915) - Freddy
- Over Night (1915) - Percy Darling
- At First Sight (1917) - Hartly Poole
- Uncle Tom's Cabin (1918) - Simon Legree
- A Woman's Experience (1918) - George Roydant
- Almost Married (1919) - Lt. James 'Jim' Winthrop Jr.
- His Father's Wife (1919) - Lieutenant James 'Jim' Winthrop Jr.
- Get-Rich-Quick Wallingford (1921) - J. Rufus Wallingford
- Mighty Lak' a Rose (1923) - Jerome Trevor
- Little Old New York (1923) - Cornelius Vanderbilt
- The Half-Way Girl (1925) - Jardine
- Bluebeard's Seven Wives (1925) - Gindelheim
- When Love Grows Cold (1926) - William Graves
- The Savage (1926) - Managing Editor
- The Great Deception (1926) - Handy
- Prince of Tempters (1926) - Apollo Beneventa
- The Perfect Sap (1927) - Nick Fanshaw
- Orchids and Ermine (1927) - Hank
- High Hat (1927) - Tony
- Broadway Nights (1927) - Johnny Fay
- The Life of Riley (1927) - Al Montague
- A Texas Steer (1927) - Brassy Gall
- Burning Up Broadway (1928) - Spike
- Turn Back the Hours (1928) - 'Ace' Kearney
- The Big Noise (1928) - Philip Hurd
- Diamond Handcuffs (1928) - Spike
- The Butter and Egg Man (1928) - Joe Lehman
- The Night Bird (1928) - Gleason
- Outcast (1928) - Jack
- Give and Take (1928) - Craig - the Industrialist
- The Rainbow (1929) - Derbyy Scanlon
- The Rainbow Man (1929) - Doc Hardy
- A Man's Man (1929) - Charlie
- On with the Show! (1929) - Jerry
- Big News (1929) - Joe Reno
- Fast Company (1929) - Dave Walker
- Acquitted (1929) - Frank Egan
- Mexicali Rose (1929) - Happy Manning
- The Girl from Mexico (1929)
- Burning Up (1930) - Windy 'Wally' Wallace
- Song of the West (1930) - Davolo
- True to the Navy (1930) - Brady
- The Gay Nineties (1930)(*aka The Floradora Girl) - Harry Fontaine
- Borrowed Wives (1930) - G.W. Parker
- The Leather Pushers (1930) - Rooney - Kane's Manager
- Reno (1930) - J.B. Berkley
- June Moon (1931) - Sam Hart
- The Millionaire (1931) - McCoy
- Annabelle's Affairs (1931) - James Ludgate
- The Miracle Woman (1931) - Bob Hornsby
- The Magnificent Lie (1931) - Larry
- Peach O'Reno (1931) - Judge Jackson
- The Dark Horse (1932) - Mr. Black
- Make Me a Star (1932) - Jeff Baird
- The Phantom of Crestwood (1932) - Pete Harris
- Face in the Sky (1933) - Triplet The Great
- Goldie Gets Along (1933) - Sam Muldoon
- King Kong (1933) - Charles Weston
- The Big Brain (1933) - Slick Ryan
- Three-Cornered Moon (1933) - Hawkins
- Ann Vickers (1933) - Ignatz Spaulding
- Curtain at Eight (1933) - Martin Gallagher - Captain of Detectives
- Little Miss Marker (1934) - Benny the Gouge
- Aunt Sally (1934) - Michael 'King' Kelly
- I Give My Love (1934) - Pogey
- Transatlantic Merry-Go-Round (1934) - Jack Summers
- Night Alarm (1934) - Editor Stephen Caldwell
- The Gay Bride (1934) - Daniel J. Dingle
- Break of Hearts (1935) - Marx
- Hooray for Love (1935) - Mr. Ganz - aka Abbey
- Powdersmoke Range (1935) - Big Steve Ogden (final film role)

== Bibliography ==
- Goldner, Orville & Turner, George Eugene. The Making of King Kong: The Story Behind a Film Classic. A. S. Barnes, 1975.
- Low, Rachael. History of the British Film: Filmmaking in 1930s Britain. George Allen & Unwin, 1985.
