= I'd Give My Life =

1936 film by Edwin L. Marin

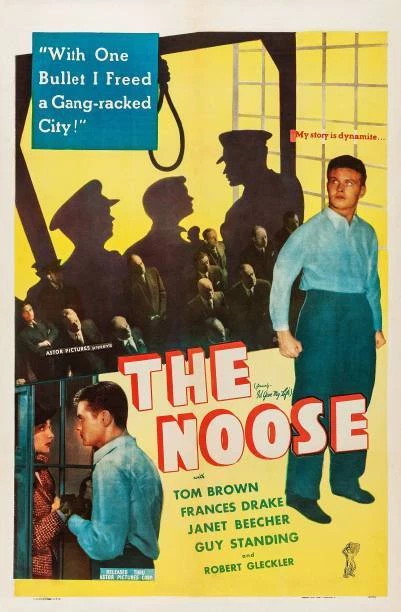
- Directed by: Edwin L. Marin
- Screenplay by: George O'Neil
- Based on: The Noose by Willard Mack and H.H. Van Sloan
- Produced by: Richard A. Rowland; Bert Lytell
- Starring: Sir Guy Standing; Frances Drake; Tom Brown; Janet Beecher; Robert Gleckler; Helen Lowell
- Cinematography: Ira H. Morgan
- Edited by: W. Duncan Mansfield
- Music by: John Leipold
- Production company: Richard A. Rowland Productions
- Distributed by: Paramount Pictures
- Release date: August 14, 1936
- Running time: 73 minutes
- Country: United States
- Language: English

I'd Give My Life is a 1936 American drama film directed by Edwin L. Marin and written by George O'Neil based upon the play The Noose by H. H. Van Loan and Willard Mack. The film stars Guy Standing, Frances Drake, Tom Brown, Janet Beecher, Robert Gleckler, and Helen Lowell. The film was released on August 14, 1936, by Paramount Pictures. This was Richard A. Rowland's first film with Paramount.

The play was previously filmed as The Noose (1928). The Hays Production Code had come into effect between the original 1928 film and this remake, and the script was watered down to fit the code, which some critics felt hurt the film.

The film failed to renew its copyright, so it's now in the public domain.

== Plot ==
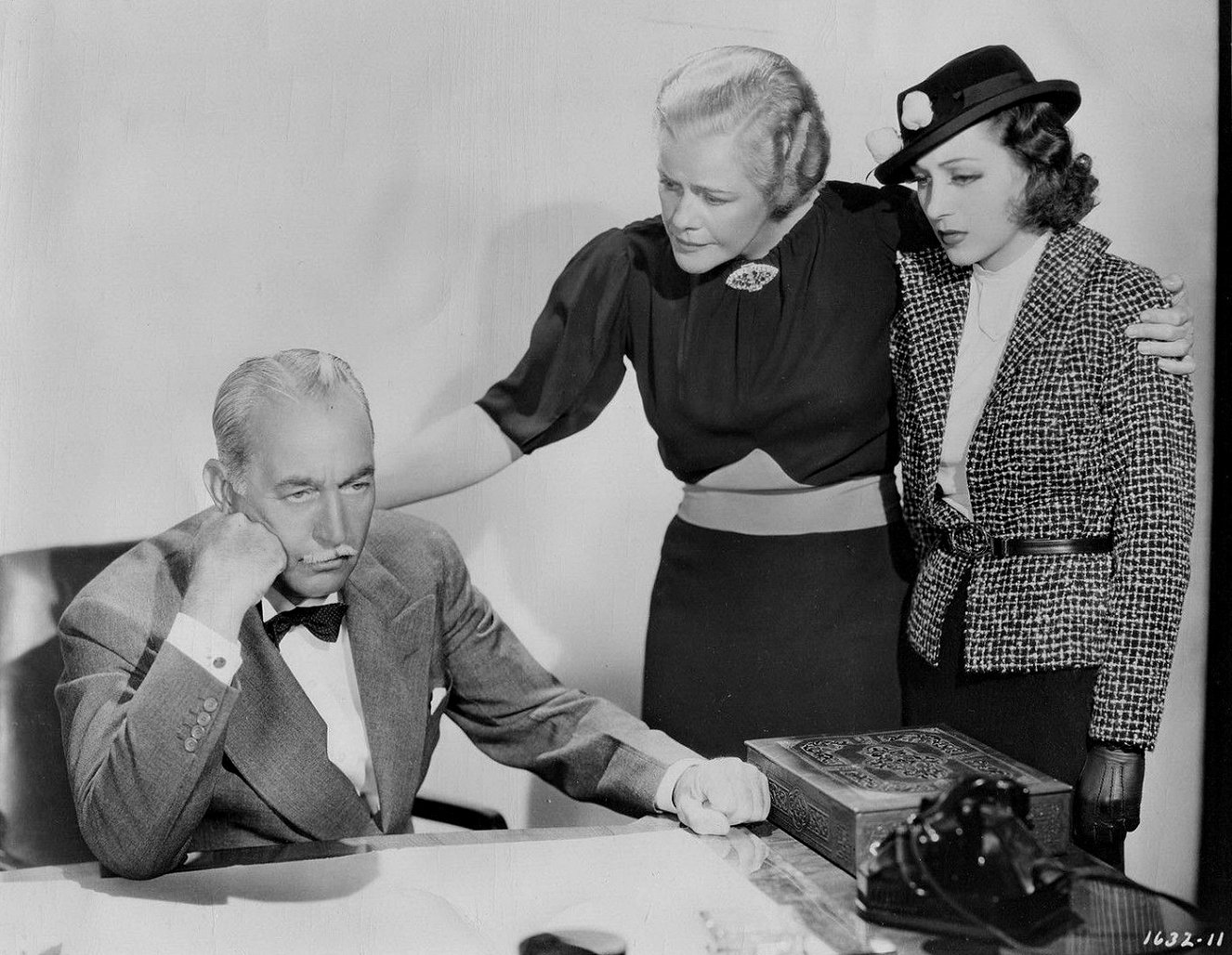
From left to right: Guy Standing sitting, next to Janet Beecher and Frances Drake who are standing, in a production still from I'd Give My Life

The film starts with the arrival at the state capital of the new governor and his wife, truly decent people who long to do good for the people of their state. A new clean-up governor is told by the local crime boss that he'll regret being a new broom.

A young but charming hoodlum (Tom Brown), raised as a foundling in an orphanage, is a pet protégé of racketeer Robert Geckler — the very man the governor has promised to get rid of. The young man is in love with a beautiful nightclub singer (Frances Drake) at the club which fronts the rackets.

When the boy refuses to carry out a violent order and plans to quit, the crime boss reveals a shocking truth: the boss is actually the boy's biological father by the governor's wife. He had stolen the boy when the relationship broke up and put him through reform school to train him for a life of crime.

Brown shoots the nefarious criminal down after learning the truth about his parentage — realizing he is a pawn in a truly horrible plan for revenge, he feels he has no choice.

At his trial he is sentenced to hang, not least because he offers no defense — he wants to protect his mother, who believes her baby had died. Everyone involved wants the sentence to be commuted, but the law is implacable.

== Cast ==
- Sir Guy Standing as Governor John Bancroft
- Frances Drake as Mary Reyburn
- Tom Brown as Nickie Elkins
- Janet Beecher as Mrs. Bancroft
- Robert Gleckler as Buck Gordon
- Helen Lowell as Mrs. Bancroft Sr.
- Paul Hurst as Conly
- Charles C. Wilson as Warden
- Charles Richman as Attorney Bill Chase
- Thomas E. Jackson as Doyle
