= Burning Up (film) =

1930 film

- Film poster
- Directed by: A. Edward Sutherland
- Written by: Grover Jones; William Slavens McNutt
- Starring: Richard Arlen; Mary Brian; Francis McDonald; Sam Hardy; Charles Sellon; Tully Marshall
- Cinematography: Allen G. Siegler
- Edited by: Richard H. Digges Jr.
- Music by: Gerard Carbonara; Gene Lucas
- Production company: Paramount Pictures
- Distributed by: Paramount Pictures
- Release date: February 1, 1930
- Running time: 60 minutes
- Country: United States
- Language: English

Burning Up

Burning Up is a 1930 American Pre-Code action film directed by A. Edward Sutherland and written by Grover Jones and William Slavens McNutt. The film stars Richard Arlen as a racing driver and Mary Brian as his love interest, the daughter of a fellow driver. An early talkie, the film also features motorcycle stunts, and also stars Francis McDonald, Sam Hardy, Charles Sellon, and Tully Marshall. The film was released on February 1, 1930, by Paramount Pictures.

The film was made in an effort by Paramount's Jesse L. Lasky to emulate the success of earlier racing films made by the late Wallace Reid, "emulating Wally's films almost exactly", and with director Allen Sigler having "filmed the racing scenes exactly as Wally's had been done". One review described it as "the old racing-car scenario brought up to date with sound and talk", but a later assessment was that despite the fact that Allen G. Siegler had "filmed the racing scenes exactly as Wally's had been done", Arlen as the star "could not bring Wally's imagery to screen".

== Cast ==
- Richard Arlen as Lou Larrigan
- Mary Brian as Ruth Morgan
- Francis McDonald as "Bullet" McGhan
- Sam Hardy as Wally "Windy Wally" Wallace
- Charles Sellon as James R. Morgan
- Tully Marshall as Dave Gentry
