= The Noose (film) =

1928 film

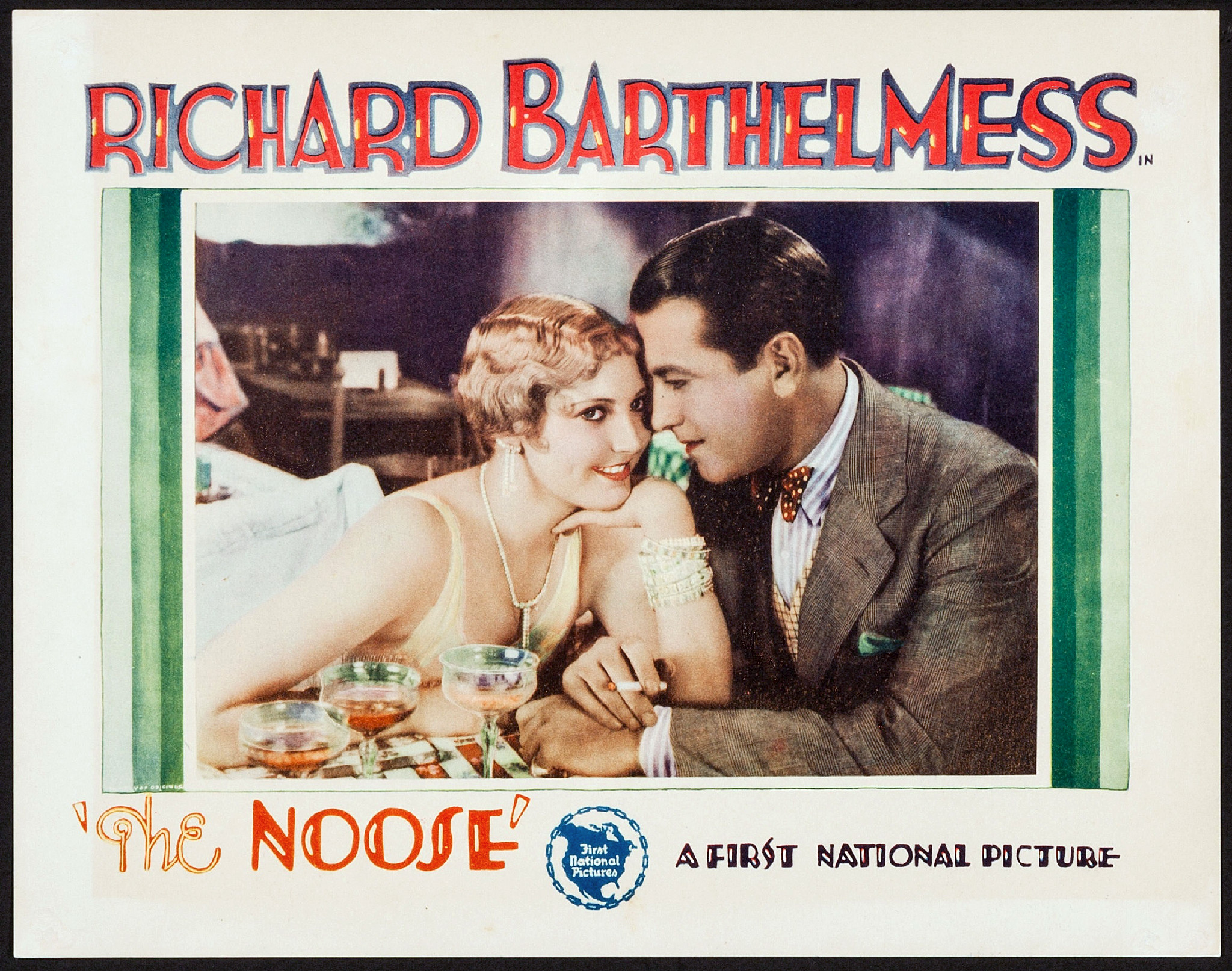
- Lobby card
- Directed by: John Francis Dillon
- Written by: James T. O'Donohoe (adaptation); Garrett Graham (titles)
- Story by: H.H. Van Sloan
- Based on: The Noose by Willard Mack and H.H. Van Sloan
- Produced by: Henry Hobart; Richard A. Rowland
- Starring: Richard Barthelmess
- Cinematography: James Van Trees
- Edited by: Jack Dennis
- Distributed by: First National Pictures
- Release date: January 29, 1928
- Running time: 8 reels (7,331 feet) 65 minutes
- Country: United States
- Language: Silent (English intertitles)

The Noose is an American silent drama film adaptation of the Willard Mack play The Noose, which was released in 1928 by First National Pictures. It stars Richard Barthelmess, Montagu Love, Robert Emmett O'Connor, and Thelma Todd. It was directed by John Francis Dillon and Richard Barthelmess's performance was nominated for the Academy Award for Best Actor. The movie was adapted by Garrett Graham and James T. O'Donohoe from the play. The play was also the basis of the Paramount Pictures film I'd Give My Life (1936).

== Cast ==
=== Credited ===
- Richard Barthelmess as Nickie Elkins
- Montagu Love as Buck Gordon
- Robert Emmett O'Connor as Jim Conley
- Jay Eaton as Tommy
- Lina Basquette as Dot
- Thelma Todd as Phyllis
- Ed Brady as Seth McMillan
- Fred Warren as Dave, Pianist
- Alice Joyce as Mrs. Bancroft
- Will Walling as Warden (as William Walling)
- Robert T. Haines as Governor
- Ernest Hilliard as Craig
- Emile Chautard as Priest
- Romaine Fielding as Judge
- Yola d'Avril as Cabaret Girl

=== Uncredited ===
- William B. Davidson as Bill Chase
- Mike Donlin as Waiter
- Joseph W. Girard as Captain of the Guards
- Bob Kortman as Death Row Convict
- Ivan Linow as Death Row Convict
- Charles McMurphy as Bar Patron
- Monte Montague as Guard
- George H. Reed as Death Row Inmate
- Hector Sarno as Rival Hood
- Harry Semels as Waiter
- Charles Sullivan as Head Waiter

== Preservation ==
A print of The Noose is located at the Museum of Modern Art in New York City.
