= The Noose (play) =

1926 play

- Original language: English
- Written by: Willard Mack
- Based on: Story by H. H. Van Loan
- Subject: Condemned man won't speak to save himself
- Genre: Melodrama
- Setting: Office of the state Governor; Box Stall Night Club

Premiere
- Date: October 20, 1926
- Place: Hudson Theatre
- Directed by: Willard Mack

The Noose is a 1926 play in three acts written by Willard Mack. It is a melodrama, with a large cast, fast pacing, and two settings. The story tells of a young man condemned for the murder of a fellow bootlegger, and his refusal to explain why he did it.

Produced by Mrs. Henry B. Harris in arrangement with Martin Sempter, and staged by the author, it starred George Nash, Ann Shoemaker, Lester Lonergan, and Rex Cherryman. It ran on Broadway from October 1926 through April 1927. It marked the dramatic debut of Barbara Stanwyck, who had been a dancer in a Broadway musical revue under her birthname of Ruby Stevens. The play had no Broadway revivals, but was adapted for a 1928 silent film of the same name and a 1936 movie called I'd Give My Life.

== Characters ==
Lead

- John Bancroft is the Governor of the state.
- Stella Bancroft is the Governor's wife
- Nickie Elkins is a young man of uncertain parentage, caught up in a bootlegging gang.
- Buck Gordon is the head of the bootlegging gang, whose murder Elkins commits.

Supporting

- Bill Chase is a friend of the Governor and attorney for Nickie Elkins.
- Craig is the Governor's secretary.
- Hughes is the Warden of the state prison where Nickle Elkins is held.
- Dave Stern is a song-writing piano player at the Box Stall Night Club.
- Jack Grattan is an undercover policeman assigned to enforce Prohibition.
- Dot is a Box Stall Night Club chorus girl, in love with Nickie, who doesn't know.
- "Come-On" Conley is Buck Gordon's partner in bootlegging.

Featured

- A Waiter works at the Box Stall Night Club.
- Georgie is a chorus girl at the Box Stall Night Club.
- Frances is a chorus girl at the Box Stall Night Club.
- Patsy is a chorus girl at the Box Stall Night Club.
- Gladys is the lead dancer of the Box Stall Night Club's chorus girls.
- Tommy Jordan
- Seth McMillan
- Miss Devoy
- Phyllis is a society girl in whom Nickie is interested.

Off-Stage

- Mrs. Anderson is Phyllis' chaperone when visiting the nightclub.

== Synopsis ==
Act I (Governor Bancroft's official residence, evening) Nickie Elkins has been condemned for the murder of bootlegger Buck Gordon. He offered no defense or explanation for his action, even to his attorney Bill Chase. Chase, with the assistance of Stella Bancroft who is strangely moved by the young man's plight, persuades the Governor to see Elkins. Chase hopes the youthful appearance of his client will move the Governor to pardon him. Craig escorts Warden Hughes and Elkins into the Governor's office. There Chase recounts the boy's background: no known parents, raised by criminals including Buck Gordon, he'd recently gotten a bank clerk's position. Stella tries to encourage the boy to talk, but he merely asks her not to worry about him. He covertly hands her a sealed letter. To the others, Elkins doesn't deny the killing, but will only say "the man was no good". Warden Hughes then returns Elkins to the nearby state prison.

Act II (The Back Stall Night Club, two months earlier, evening. This flashback is only for the audience, there is no suggestion characters from Act I are aware of it.) The bootlegging gang operates out of the night club. Elkins is seen associating there with other members of the gang, such as Buck Gordon and Come-On Conley. Phyllis is at the night club with Mrs. Anderson. Elkins knows her, and they have a mutual interest in each other. The night club's chorus girls do a dance number. Dot is in love with Elkins, but accepts that he only feels friendship for her. Elkins sneaks Phyllis into the back office where they confess their love and kiss. Dot warns them that Buck is coming and escorts Phyllis back to Mrs. Anderson. Elkins tells Buck he's leaving the gang. Buck becomes enraged; he reveals to Elkins that he is his father. His mother is a woman whose politically well-connected husband will have to help him beat an indictment or he'll make the old liaison public. Elkins draws his gun and shoots Buck dead.

Act III (Same place and time as Act I) The Governor has still not made up his mind about Elkins' fate. As the Governor ponders his decision, a telephone call is made to the state prison, cancelling the execution by order of the Governor. The Governor is puzzled, and so is the audience, for the playwright never explains what happened. Craig then lets Dot into the office, where she pleads to be allowed Elkins' body, since he has no relatives. The Governor discerns her love and tells her Elkins is still alive. He arranges for Dot to see him. Hughes brings Elkins back to the Governor's office, where Stella hands him back his envelope, still sealed. They depart and the Governor asks his wife for something to eat. (Curtain)

== Original production ==
=== Background ===
When H. H. Van Loan was a reporter for the Buffalo Courier Express, he witnessed an execution for which the condemned man had refused to speak in his own defense until the last moment. Just before execution, he admitted the killing legally, but justified it by saying the murdered man was no good. The event inspired Van Loan to write a short story for a magazine, which he and Willard Mack then turned into this play. According to Mack on opening night, he wrote the play "something more than a year ago"; Broadway was then a month old.

Mrs. Henry B. (Renee) Harris was a Titanic survivor; her showman husband had gone down with the ship. She owned the Hudson Theatre, and was involved with the casting and play doctoring of The Noose. Mack's original play had the Governor's daughter as a character, who begs for Nickie Elkins' body in the third act. Harris persuaded Mack to replace this role with an unrelated society girl as Nickie's mutual love interest, while the pathos of the third act would come from a lowly chorus girl, with whom he was just friends.

=== Cast ===
Principal cast for the tryouts in Buffalo and Pittsburgh, and during the original Broadway run.
Role	Actor	Dates	Notes and sources
John Bancroft	Lester Lonergan	Oct 04, 1926 - Apr 09, 1927	
Bill Chase	Ralph Locke	Oct 04, 1926 - Apr 09, 1927	
Stella Bancroft	Ann Shoemaker	Oct 04, 1926 - Dec 18, 1926	Cast lists for this production invariably credit her as "Anne".
Stella Bancroft	Isabel Randolph	Dec 20, 1926 - Apr 09, 1927	
Nickie Elkins	Rex Cherryman	Oct 04, 1926 - Apr 09, 1927	
Buck Gordon	George Nash	Oct 04, 1926 - Apr 09, 1927	
Craig	Hans Robert	Oct 04, 1926 - Apr 09, 1927	
Hughes	George Thompson	Oct 04, 1926 - Apr 09, 1927	
Dave Stern	Harry Bulger Jr.	Oct 04, 1926 - Apr 09, 1927	
Jack Grattan	Jack Daly	Oct 04, 1926 - Apr 09, 1927	
Dot	Barbara Stanwyck	Oct 04, 1926 - Apr 09, 1927	This was her first credit with the name David Belasco chose for her.
"Come-On" Conley	Wilfred Lucas	Oct 04, 1926 - Apr 09, 1927	
Frances	Dorothy Sheppard	Oct 04, 1926 - Apr 09, 1927	Sheppard, Clarke, and Stanwyck were friends who had danced for revues and Club Anatol.
Georgie	Mae Clarke	Oct 04, 1926 - Apr 09, 1927	Clarke, just 16, shared rooms at the Knickerbocker Hotel with Sheppard and Stanwyck.
Patsy	Erenay Weaver	Oct 04, 1926 - Apr 09, 1927	
Gladys	Maryland Jarbeau	Oct 04, 1926 - Apr 09, 1927	Jarbeau had been with the Ziegfeld Follies before joining this play.
Tommy Jordan	Charles Brown	Oct 04, 1926 - Apr 09, 1927	
Seth McMillan	George Barnum	Oct 04, 1926 - Apr 09, 1927	
Miss Devoy	Carolyn Clarke	Oct 04, 1926 - Apr 09, 1927	
Phyllis	Helen Flint	Oct 04, 1926 - Apr 09, 1927	

=== Tryouts ===
The first tryout occurred in Buffalo, New York on October 4, 1926 at the Shubert-Teck Theatre. The producers Renee Harris and Martin Sampler were present as were the story author H. H. Van Loan and the playwright-director Willard Mack. The reviews were enthusiastic and uncritical. One singled out actress Helen Flint (Note: The reviewer mistakenly ascribed to her the character "Gladys" instead of "Phyllis", even though it was correctly attributed in the cast list at the beginning of the review.) for the third act emotional climax, when she begs the Governor for Elkins' body. Another mentioned both Barbara Stanwyck and Helen Flint favorably without attributing specific actions to either.

After a week in Buffalo, the production moved to the Shubert Pitt Theatre in Pittsburgh, opening on October 11, 1926. One reviewer took issue with the play's use of "cuss words" in the second act night club setting, but was also highly impressed with the acting of Rex Cherryman. This same reviewer again ascribed the final scene of pleading for the body to Helen Flint, playing the society girl.

=== Premiere and reception ===
The Broadway premiere occurred on October 20, 1926 at the Hudson Theatre. Arthur Pollock of the Brooklyn Daily Eagle was scathing in his assessment of the writing: "It was written by Willard Mack, that quixotic and valiant veteran who is too busy to learn by experience. Long ago he drowned his gifts in sentimentality...". Pollock complimented actor Lester Lonergan for playing the Governor "without once seeming to laugh up his sleeve". He mentioned Mack giving a little speech from the stage after the second act: "He intimated, too, that the night club scene was not a borrowing from Broadway. The two are not a bit alike. Mr. Mack is a good fellow, possessed of gifts with which better plays than this are made. Unfortunately he has mislaid them".

The reviewer for the Brooklyn Times Union was more generous, acknowledging the play as "old-fashioned melodrama" and "the plot is downright hackneyed" but insisting Mack's talent as dramatist ensured it was still good entertainment. They did have one caveat: "It was all very well to kid the Governor about that phone call but he might have let the audience in on it." The Brooklyn Citizen reviewer said the play was entertaining with the exception of "two long outbursts against capital punishment and prohibition". The reviewer for the Standard Union praised the acting of Rex Cherryman, George Nash, and Lester Lonergan, and added "Dorothy Stanwyck is good in the leading feminine role". (Note: It is hard to untangle this obvious error, for Ann Shoemaker was the feminine lead, while "Dorothy" could refer to Dorothy Sheppard or to Stanwyck's character name, "Dot" being a diminutive for "Dorothy".)

Burns Mantle in the New York Daily News admitted the play's events "may not be creditable" but thought the entertainment value outweighed their weakness. He praised the acting of Rex Cherryman, Lester Lonergan, Ann Shoemaker, Ralph Locke, and "a nice bit by Barbara Stanwyck". The New York Times critic was generally positive about the play, despite "Mr. Mack taking not a little license with judicial procedure. Mr. Mack, however, was never one to worry too much about plausibilty if he got his effects". Like the Standard Union, the Times reviewer when praising her performance referred to "Dorothy Stanwyck", while also mentioning Rex Cherryman, George Nash, and Lester Lonergan for acting honors.

=== Closing ===
The Noose closed at the Hudson Theatre on April 9, 1927, after 202 performances. (Note: This includes two performances done on the last day, April 9, 1927.) The production company then went to Chicago where it opened on April 17, 1927 at the Selwyn Theater.

== Bibliography ==
- Wilson, Victoria. A Life of Barbara Stanwyck: Steel-True 1907-1940. New York: Simon & Schuster, November 2015. ISBN 978-0-684-83168-8.
