= Mexicali Rose (1929 film) =

1929 film

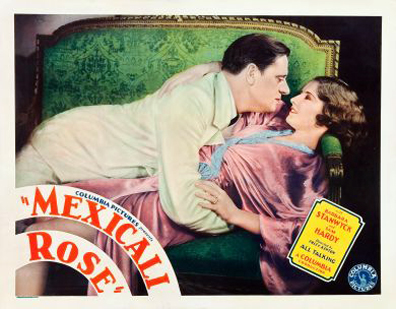
- Lobby card. Sam Hardy and Barbara Stanwyck.
- Directed by: Erle C. Kenton
- Screenplay by: Norman Houston; Gladys Lehman
- Story by: Gladys Lehman
- Produced by: Harry Cohn
- Starring: Barbara Stanwyck; Sam Hardy
- Cinematography: Ted Tetzlaff
- Edited by: Leon Barsha
- Production company: Columbia Pictures
- Distributed by: Columbia Pictures
- Release date: December 26, 1929 (USA)
- Running time: 60 minutes
- Country: United States
- Language: English

Mexicali Rose (also known as The Girl from Mexico) is a 1929 American pre-Code romantic drama film directed by Erle C. Kenton, and starring Barbara Stanwyck and Sam Hardy. Both silent and sound versions of the film are preserved at the Library of Congress.

== Plot ==
Mexicali Rose (1929)

"Happy" Manning returns early from a trip to his Mexican casino, the Mina de Oro (Gold Mine), and to his wife Rose, unaware she has been unfaithful to him with Joe, the croupier. Happy soon finds out and divorces Rose, but he keeps Joe, as Joe is too valuable an employee to lose. Afterward, he goes to visit his younger brother and ward, Bob, who is the quarterback of his college football team in California. Bob introduces him to his fiancée Marie. Bob, believing Happy owns a gold mine, promises to spend his honeymoon there. When Bob does get married, he sends Happy a telegram that he is coming. Happy's friend Ortiz offers to exchange his real gold mine for Happy's casino temporarily. Happy is shocked when Bob introduces his wife: Rose. Happy later tries to buy Rose off, but she turns him down, claiming she genuinely loves Bob. Happy is uncertain if she is lying or not and decides to not tell Bob the truth. However, it soon becomes clear that she has not changed. Happy blocks her secret late-night rendezvous with an admirer and confronts her. She claims that she loves Happy and that she married Bob to get back at him. She then tells him she is going home. The next day, she dies at the bottom of a cliff.

== Cast ==
- Barbara Stanwyck as Mexicali Rose
- Sam Hardy as Happy Manning
- William Janney as Bob Manning
- Arthur Rankin as Loco
- Louis Natheaux as Joe
- Harry Vejar as Ortiz
- Louis King as Dad, a drunk

== See also ==
- List of early sound feature films (1926–1929)
