= Barbara Stanwyck =

American actress (1907–1990)

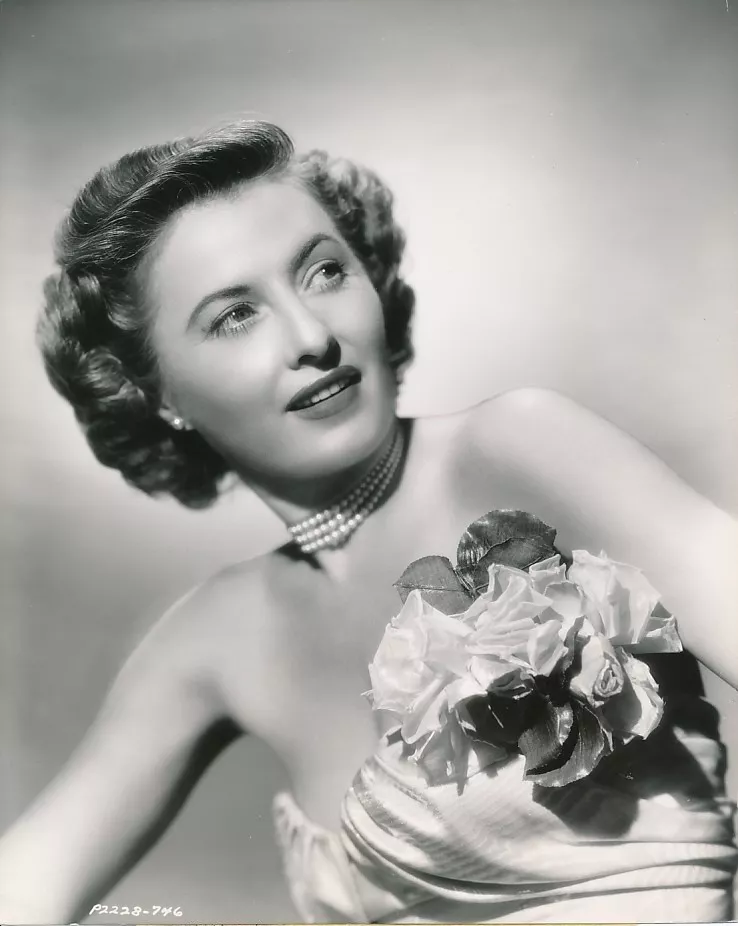
- Stanwyck in 1950
- Born: Ruby Catherine Stevens; July 16, 1907; Brooklyn, New York, U.S.
- Died: January 20, 1990 (aged 82); Santa Monica, California, U.S.
- Occupations: Actress; dancer
- Years active: 1923–1986
- Political party: Republican
- Spouses: Frank Fay (m. 1928; div. 1935); Robert Taylor (m. 1939; div. 1952)
- Children: 1

Barbara Stanwyck (/ˈstænwɪk/; born Ruby Catherine Stevens; July 16, 1907 – January 20, 1990) was an American actress and dancer. A stage, film, and television star, during her 60-year professional career she was known for her strong, realistic screen presence and versatility. She was a favorite of directors, including Cecil B. DeMille, Fritz Lang, and Frank Capra, and made 86 films in 38 years before turning to television. She received numerous accolades, including three Primetime Emmy Awards and a Golden Globe Award, and was nominated for four Academy Awards.

Orphaned at the age of four and partially raised in foster homes, she always worked. One of her directors, Jacques Tourneur, said of her, "She only lives for two things, and both of them are work." She made her debut on stage in the chorus as a Ziegfeld girl in 1923 at age 16, and within a few years was acting in plays. Her first lead role, which was in the hit Burlesque (1927), established her as a Broadway star. In 1929 she transitioned from the stage to the film industry and began acting in talking pictures, the first of which was George Archainbaud's The Locked Door, where her naturalistic acting style and unaffected vocal delivery were instantly evident. Frank Capra chose her for his romantic drama Ladies of Leisure (1930), and Stanwyck later became a favorite of Capra’s, leading to another three collaborations. This led to additional leading roles which raised her profile, such as Night Nurse (1931), Baby Face (1933), the controversial The Bitter Tea of General Yen (1933), and Gambling Lady (1934).

By the late 1930s, Stanwyck had moved to more mature roles in critically and commercially successful comedies and dramas. For her performance as the titular character in Stella Dallas (1937), she earned her first Academy Award nomination for Best Actress. In 1941, she starred in two screwball comedies: Ball of Fire with Gary Cooper, and The Lady Eve with Henry Fonda. She received her second Academy Award nomination for Ball of Fire, and in the decades since its release, The Lady Eve has come to be regarded as a comedic classic, with Stanwyck's performance widely hailed as one of the best in American comedy. Other successful films during this period are Remember the Night (1940), Meet John Doe (1941) and You Belong to Me (1941), reteaming her with Cooper and Fonda, respectively, The Gay Sisters (1942), and Lady of Burlesque (1943).

By 1944, Stanwyck had become the highest-paid actress in the United States. That year she received a third Academy Award nomination for Best Actress in the film noir Double Indemnity, playing a wife who persuades an insurance salesman to kill her husband. In 1945 she played a homemaker columnist in the holiday classic Christmas in Connecticut, and the following year starred as the titular femme fatale in The Strange Love of Martha Ivers. For the remainder of the decade Stanwyck starred in additional successes, ranging from romantic dramas and comedies to suspenseful crime-noirs. Her films during this period include My Reputation (1946), The Two Mrs. Carrolls (1947), Sorry, Wrong Number (1948), for which she received her fourth and final Academy Award nomination, and East Side, West Side (1949). By the early 1950s, Stanwyck's career began to decline, despite a fair number of leading and major supporting roles, the most successful being Clash by Night (1952), Jeopardy (1953), and Executive Suite (1954). She starred in Samuel Fuller's western Forty Guns (1957) in the role of a mighty landowner.

In the 1960s, she made a successful transition to television, where she won three Emmy Awards, for The Barbara Stanwyck Show (1961), the Western series The Big Valley (1966), and the miniseries The Thorn Birds (1983).

She received an Honorary Oscar in 1982, the Golden Globe Cecil B. DeMille Award in 1986, and several other honorary lifetime awards. In 1999 she was ranked as the 11th-greatest female star of classic American cinema by the American Film Institute.

== Early life ==
Stanwyck was born Ruby Catherine Stevens on July 16, 1907, in New York City. She was the fifth and youngest child of Kathryn Ann "Kitty" (née McPhee) and Byron E. Stevens. Both parents' families had been in North America since the 1740s. Byron, of English descent, was a native of Lanesville, Massachusetts, where his father was a significant landowner. He had aimed to become a lawyer, but had dropped out of college in favor of work after his father's death, eventually becoming a bricklayer and stonesetter. Stanwyck's mother Kitty was a Canadian immigrant of Scottish-Irish descent from Sydney, Nova Scotia. They had met when Kitty was visiting family in Boston.

Stanwyck had three older sisters and one older brother. The family had relocated from New England to Flatbush, Brooklyn the year before Stanwyck was born in search of better work opportunities for Byron. In July 1911, four-year-old Stanwyck and her six-year-old brother were riding a streetcar with their mother when a drunk passenger fell and pushed their mother off the vehicle. Kitty Stevens was heavily pregnant at the time, and the accident induced early labor, which caused fatal sepsis. Byron Stevens' alcoholism worsened after his wife's death, and he left the family soon after. He joined a work crew digging the Panama Canal in 1912, dying there some years later in an epidemic.

Stanwyck's sisters were already adults when their mother died, but while they stayed closely involved in their younger siblings' lives, they could not take care of them full-time. In the years following the disintegration of their family, Stanwyck and her brother lived in a series of unofficial foster homes (mostly friends of the family) in Flatbush. As the foster homes could only accommodate one child at a time, the siblings were separated, which caused them additional distress. Around 1919, Stanwyck and her brother moved in with their older sister and her family.

I knew that after fourteen I'd have to earn my own living, but I was willing to do that ... I've always been a little sorry for pampered people, and of course, they're "very" sorry for me.

Barbara Stanwyck, 1937

Stanwyck attended Public School 152 in Brooklyn. She hated school with the exception of literature, and received generally poor grades. She was bullied and routinely picked fights with the other students. Stanwyck started to dream about entering show business in childhood. One of her sisters had become a successful vaudeville dancer and took Stanwyck with her on summer tours. She also idolized film star Pearl White, whose serial The Perils of Pauline (1914) was popular at the time. As a teenager, Stanwyck began performing in amateur theater and in shows at film theaters in Flatbush.

After graduating from P.S. 152, Stanwyck decided to not attend high school. Starting at 14, she took a series of customer-service and secretarial positions, which allowed her to gain financial independence while pursuing her goal of becoming a celebrated dancer.

== Career ==
=== Ziegfeld girl and Broadway success ===
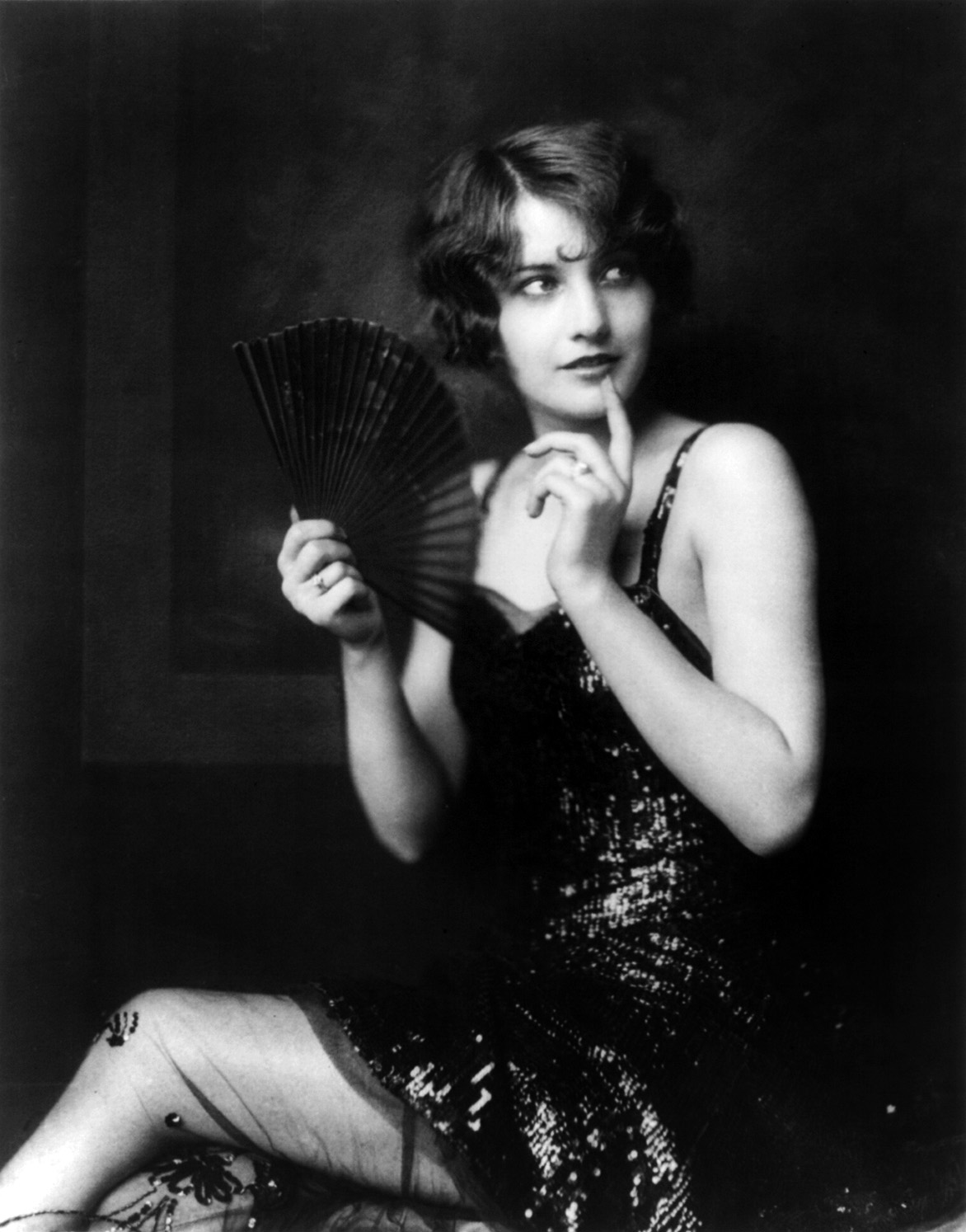
Stanwyck as a Ziegfeld girl in a 1924 photo by Alfred Cheney Johnston

In 1923, a few months before her 16th birthday, Stanwyck auditioned for a place in the chorus at the Strand Roof, a nightclub over the Strand Theatre in Times Square. A few months later, she obtained a job as a dancer in the 1922 and 1923 seasons of the Ziegfeld Follies, dancing at the New Amsterdam Theater. For the next several years, she worked as a chorus girl, performing from midnight to seven in the morning at nightclubs owned by Texas Guinan. She also occasionally served as a dance instructor at a speakeasy owned by Guinan. One of her good friends during those years was pianist Oscar Levant, who described her as being "wary of sophisticates and phonies".

Billy LaHiff, who owned a popular pub frequented by show people, introduced Stanwyck in 1926 to impresario Willard Mack, who was casting his play The Noose. Stanwyck successfully auditioned for the part of the chorus girl. As initially staged, the play was not a success. In an effort to improve it, Mack decided to expand Stanwyck's part to include more pathos. The Noose reopened in October 1926, and became one of the most successful plays of the season, running on Broadway for nine months and 198 performances. At the suggestion of David Belasco, Stanwyck changed her name to Barbara Stanwyck by combining the first name of the title character in the play Barbara Frietchie with the last name of the actress in the play, Jane Stanwyck; both were found on a 1906 theater program.

Stanwyck had her first leading role in Burlesque (1927), which was a critical and commercial success. Its producer Arthur Hopkins later described casting her because she had "a sort of rough poignancy. She at once displayed more sensitive, easily expressed emotion than I had encountered since Pauline Lord." The same year, Stanwyck made her first film appearance as a fan dancer in Broadway Nights (1927). While playing in Burlesque, Stanwyck had begun a relationship with actor Frank Fay. Soon after marrying on August 26, 1928, the couple moved to Los Angeles, where Stanwyck hoped to pursue a career in films.

=== Film career ===
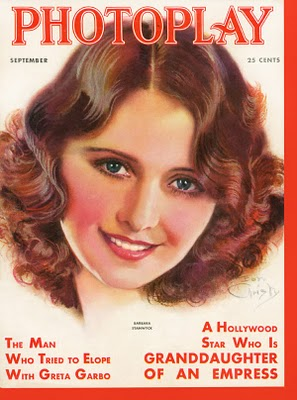
Photoplay magazine cover

Stanwyck's first sound film was The Locked Door (1929), followed by Mexicali Rose, released in the same year. Neither film was successful; nonetheless, Frank Capra chose Stanwyck for his film Ladies of Leisure (1930). Her work in that production established an enduring friendship with the director and led to future parts in his films. Other prominent roles followed, among them as a nurse who saves two little girls from the villainous chauffeur (Clark Gable) in Night Nurse (1931). In Edna Ferber's novel brought to screen by William Wellman, she portrays small-town teacher and valiant Midwest farm woman Selena in So Big! (1932). She followed with a performance as an ambitious woman sleeping her way to the top from "the wrong side of the tracks" in Baby Face (1933), a controversial pre-code thriller. In The Bitter Tea of General Yen (1933), another controversial pre-code film by director Capra, Stanwyck portrays an idealistic Christian caught behind the lines of the Chinese Civil War kidnapped by warlord Nils Asther. A flop at the time, though it received some critical success, the lavish film is "dark stuff, and it's difficult to imagine another actress handling this ... philosophical conversion as fearlessly as Ms. Stanwyck does. She doesn't make heavy weather of it."

Regarding her pre-code work, Mick LaSalle, movie critic for the San Francisco Chronicle, said, "If you've never seen Stanwyck in a pre-code film, you've never seen Stanwyck. [The code began to be enforced seriously beginning in July 1934.] Never in her career, including Double Indemnity, was she ever as hard-boiled as she was in the early 1930s. She had a wonderful quality of being both incredibly cool and yet blazingly passionate. Her cynicism was profound, and then, without warning, she would explode into shrieking, sobbing."

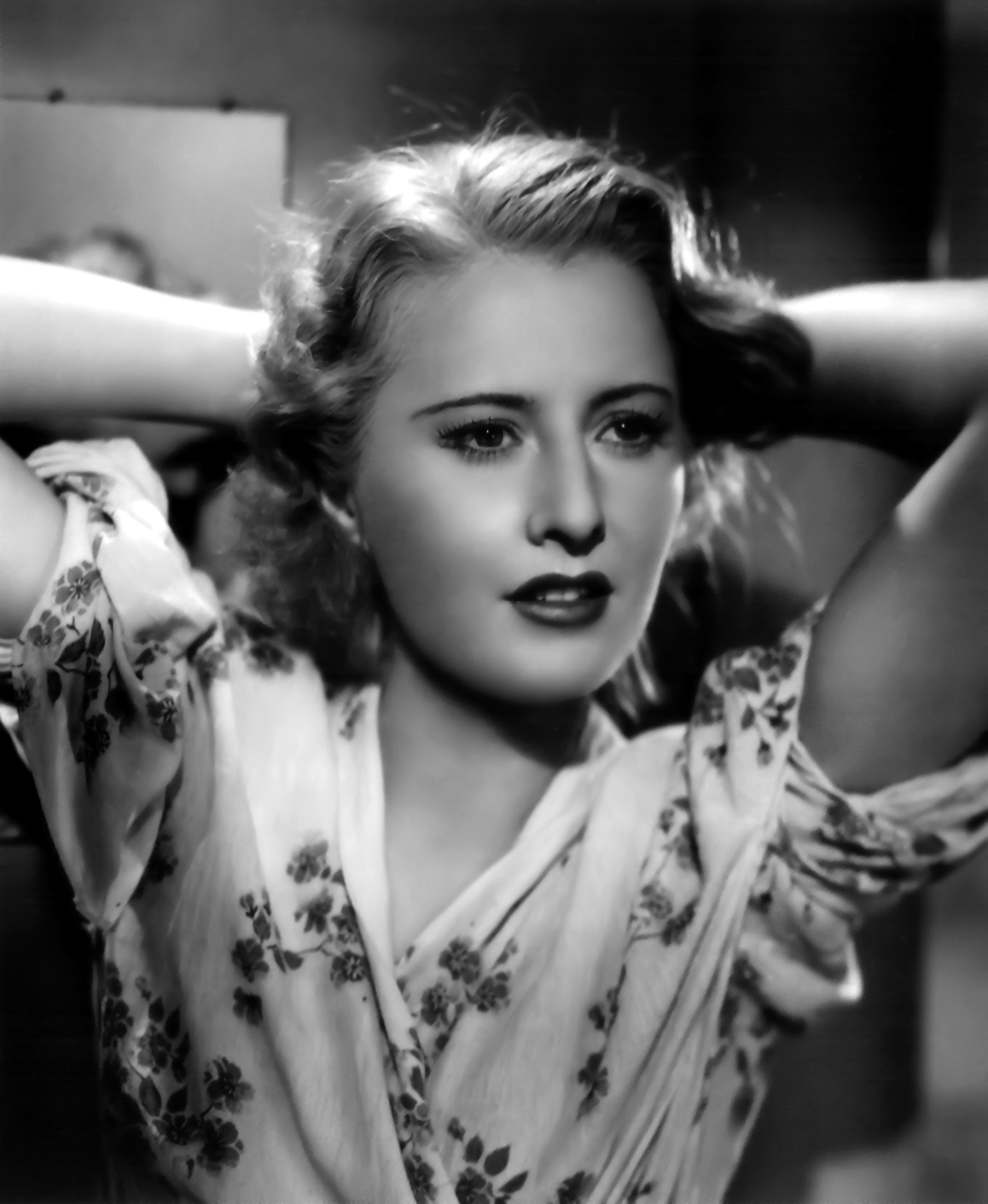
Stanwyck in her award-nominated role as Stella Dallas in 1937

In Stella Dallas (1937), she plays the self-sacrificing title character who eventually allows her teenaged daughter to live a better life somewhere else. She landed her first Academy Award nomination for Best Actress when she was able to portray her character as vulgar, yet sympathetic, as required by the movie. Next, she played Molly Monahan in Union Pacific (1939) with Joel McCrea. Stanwyck was reportedly one of the many actresses considered for the role of Scarlett O'Hara in Gone with the Wind (1939), although she did not receive a screen test. In Meet John Doe, she plays an ambitious newspaperwoman with Gary Cooper (1941).

In Preston Sturges's romantic comedy The Lady Eve (1941), she plays a slinky, sophisticated confidence woman who "gives off an erotic charge that would straighten a boa constrictor", while falling in love with her intended mark, a guileless, wealthy herpetologist, played by Henry Fonda. Film critic David Thomson described Stanwyck as "giving one of the best American comedy performances", and she was reviewed as brilliantly versatile in "her bravura double performance" by The Guardian. The Lady Eve is among the top 100 movies of all time on Time and Entertainment Weekly's lists, and is considered to be both a great comedy and a great romantic film with its placement at #55 on the AFI's 100 Years...100 Laughs list and #26 on its 100 Years...100 Passions list.

Next, she was the extremely successful, independent doctor Helen Hunt in You Belong to Me (1941), also with Fonda. Stanwyck then played nightclub performer Sugarpuss O'Shea in the Howard Hawks-directed, but Billy Wilder-written comedy Ball of Fire (1941). In this update of the Snow White and Seven Dwarfs tale, she gives professor Bertram Potts (played by Gary Cooper) a better understanding of "modern English" in the performance for which she received an Academy Award nomination for Best Actress.

"That is the kind of woman that makes whole civilizations topple." – Kathleen Howard on Stanwyck's character in Ball of Fire.

In Double Indemnity (1944), the seminal film noir thriller directed by Billy Wilder, she plays Phyllis Dietrichson, who lures an infatuated insurance salesman (Fred MacMurray), into killing her husband. Stanwyck was critically hailed for bringing out the cruel nature of the "grim, unflinching murderess", marking her as the "most notorious femme fatale" in the film noir genre. Double Indemnity is usually considered to be among the top 100 films of all time, though it did not win any of its seven Academy Award nominations. It is the number 38 film of all time on the American Film Institute's list, as well as the number 24 on its 100 Years...100 Thrills list and number 84 on its 100 Years...100 Passions list.

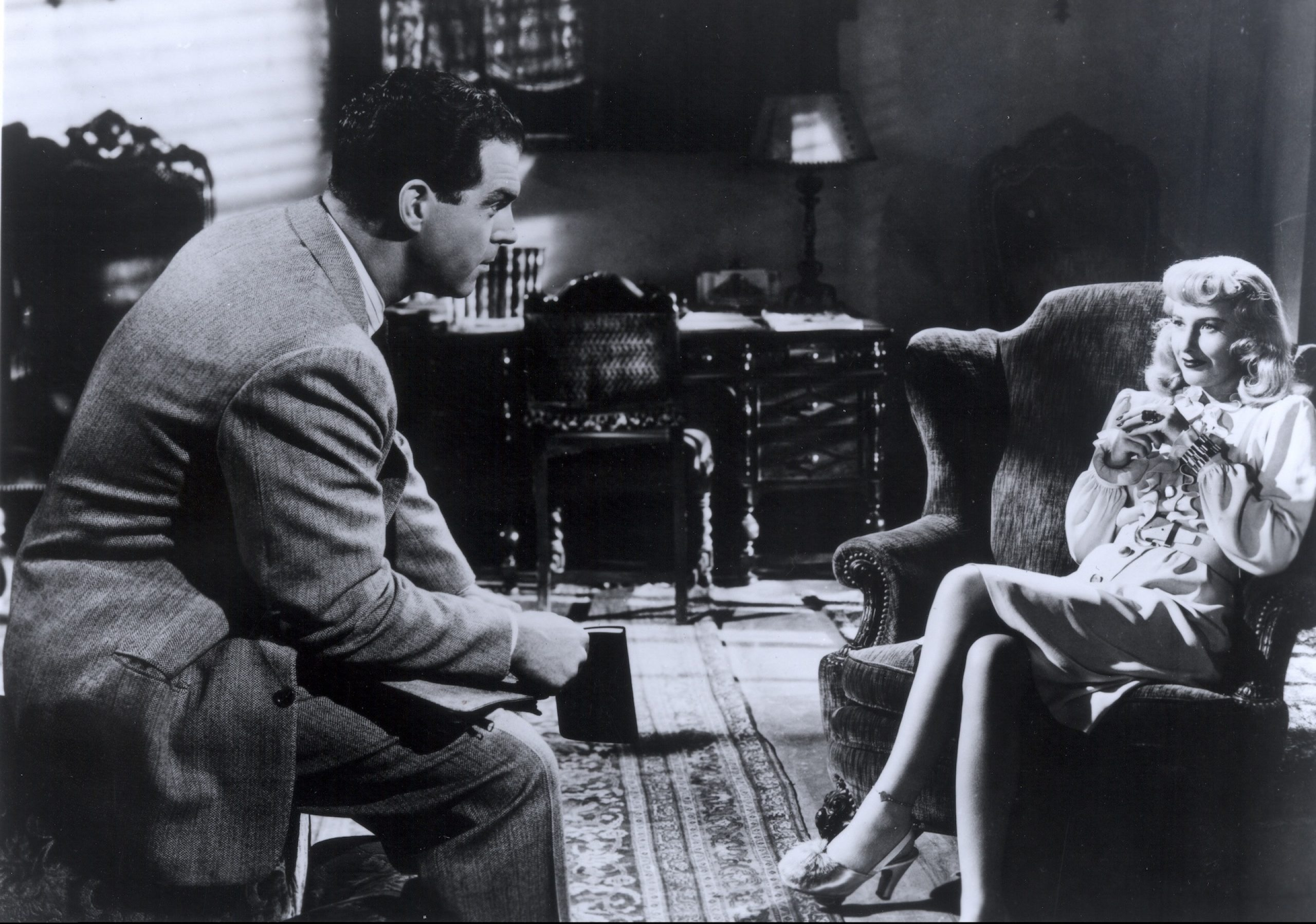
Fred MacMurray and Stanwyck in the seminal noir film Double Indemnity (1944)

She plays a columnist touted as the "greatest cook in the country" caught up in white lies while trying to pursue a romance in the comedy Christmas in Connecticut (1945). It was a hit upon release and remains a treasured holiday classic today. In 1946, she was "liquid nitrogen" as Martha, a manipulative murderess, starring with Van Heflin and newcomer Kirk Douglas in The Strange Love of Martha Ivers. Stanwyck was also the vulnerable, invalid wife who overhears her own murder being plotted in Sorry, Wrong Number (1948) and the doomed concert pianist in The Other Love (1947). In the latter film's soundtrack, the piano music is actually being performed by Ania Dorfmann, who drilled Stanwyck for three hours a day until the actress was able to synchronize the motion of her arms and hands to match the music's tempo, giving a convincing impression that Stanwyck is playing the piano.

Pauline Kael, a longtime film critic for The New Yorker, admired the natural appearance of Stanwyck's acting style on screen, noting that she "seems to have an intuitive understanding of the fluid physical movements that work best on camera". In reference to the actress's film work during the early sound era, Kael observed that the "[e]arly talkies sentimentality ... only emphasizes Stanwyck's remarkable modernism."

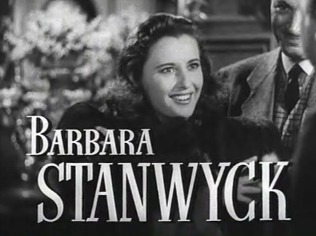
Meet John Doe (1941)

Stanwyck was known for her accessibility and kindness to the backstage crew on any film set. She knew the names of many of their wives and children. Frank Capra said of Stanwyck: "She was destined to be beloved by all directors, actors, crews and extras. In a Hollywood popularity contest, she would win first prize, hands down." While working on 1954's Cattle Queen of Montana (also starring Ronald Reagan) on location in Glacier National Park, she performed some of her own stunts, including a swim in the icy lake. At the age of 50, she performed an extremely difficult stunt in Forty Guns. The scene called for her character to fall from and be dragged by a horse, and the stunt was so dangerous that the film's professional stuntman refused to perform it. She was later named an honorary member of the Hollywood Stuntmen's Hall of Fame.

William Holden and Stanwyck were longtime friends, and when they were presenting the Best Sound Oscar for 1977, he paused to pay a special tribute to her for saving his career when Holden was cast in the lead for Golden Boy (1939). After a series of unsteady daily performances, he was about to be fired, but Stanwyck staunchly defended him, successfully standing up to the film producers. Shortly after Holden's death, Stanwyck recalled the moment when receiving her honorary Oscar: "A few years ago, I stood on this stage with William Holden as a presenter. I loved him very much, and I miss him. He always wished that I would get an Oscar. And so, tonight, my golden boy, you got your wish."

=== Television career ===
As Stanwyck's film career declined during the 1950s, she moved to television. In 1958, she guest-starred in "Trail to Nowhere", an episode of the Western anthology series Dick Powell's Zane Grey Theatre, playing a wife who kills a man to avenge her husband. In 1961, she hosted an anthology drama series titled The Barbara Stanwyck Show that was not a ratings success, but earned her an Emmy Award. The show ran for a total of 36 episodes. During this period, she also guest-starred on other television series, such as The Untouchables and four episodes of Wagon Train.

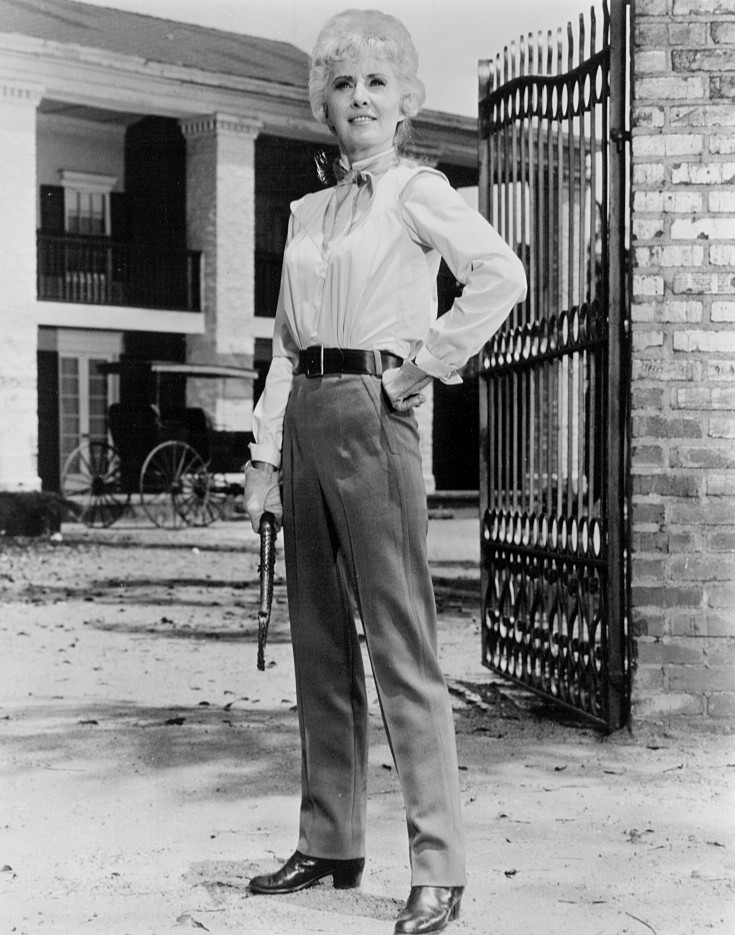
Stanwyck as matriarch Victoria Barkley on The Big Valley

She stepped back into film for the 1964 Elvis Presley film Roustabout, in which she plays a carnival owner.

The Western television series The Big Valley, which was broadcast on ABC from 1965 to 1969, made Stanwyck one of the most popular actresses on television, winning her another Emmy. She was billed in the series' opening credits as Miss Barbara Stanwyck for her role as Victoria, the widowed matriarch of the wealthy Barkley family.

In 1983, Stanwyck won an Emmy for The Thorn Birds, her third such award. In 1985, she made three guest appearances in the primetime soap opera Dynasty prior to the launch of its short-lived spin-off series The Colbys, in which she starred alongside Charlton Heston, Stephanie Beacham, and Katharine Ross. Unhappy with the experience, Stanwyck remained with the series for only the first season, and her role as Constance Colby Patterson was her last. Earl Hamner Jr., former producer of The Waltons, was rumored to have initially wanted Stanwyck for the role of Angela Channing in the 1980s soap opera Falcon Crest, and she turned it down, with the role going to her friend Jane Wyman, but Hamner assured Wyman that it was only a rumor.

== Personal life ==
=== Marriages and relationships ===
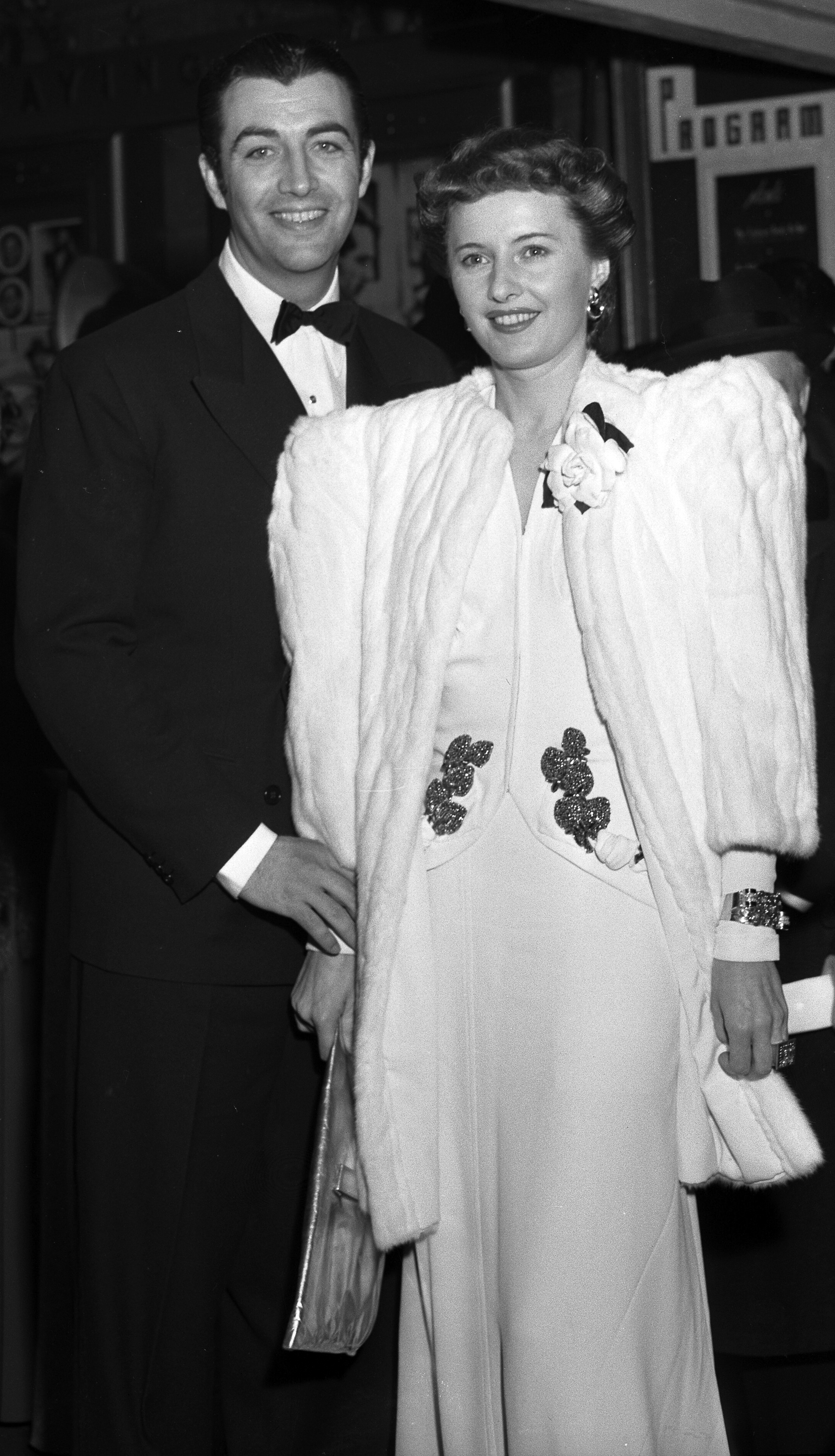
With Robert Taylor in 1941

While playing in The Noose, Stanwyck reportedly fell in love with her married co-star Rex Cherryman. When Cherryman took ill in early 1928, his doctor advised him to take a sea voyage, so Cherryman set sail for Le Havre intending to continue on to Paris, where Stanwyck and he had arranged to meet. While at sea, he contracted septic poisoning and died shortly after arriving in France at the age of 31.

On August 26, 1928, Stanwyck married her Burlesque co-star Frank Fay. Fay and she later claimed that they had disliked each other at first, but became close after Cherryman's death. Fay was Catholic, so Stanwyck converted for their marriage. She was reportedly unable to have children, and one biographer alleges the cause of her infertility was a botched abortion at the age of 15 that resulted in complications. After moving to Hollywood, the couple adopted a boy. The marriage was troubled; Fay's successful Broadway career did not translate to the big screen, whereas Stanwyck achieved Hollywood stardom. Fay was reportedly physically abusive to Stanwyck, especially when he was inebriated. Some claim that the marriage was the basis for dialogue written by William Wellman, a friend of the couple's, for A Star Is Born (1937) starring Janet Gaynor and Fredric March. The couple divorced on December 30, 1935. Stanwyck won custody of their son, whom she raised with a strict, authoritarian hand and demanding expectations. Stanwyck and her son became estranged after his childhood, meeting only a few times after he became an adult. Wrote Richard Corliss, the child "resembled her in just one respect: both were, effectively, orphans."

In 1936, while making the film His Brother's Wife (1936), Stanwyck became involved with her co-star, Robert Taylor. Rather than a torrid romance, their relationship was more one of mentor and pupil. Stanwyck served as support and adviser to the younger Taylor, who had come from a small Nebraska town; she guided his career and acclimated him to the sophisticated Hollywood culture. The couple began living together, sparking newspaper reports. Stanwyck was hesitant to remarry after the failure of her first marriage, but their 1939 marriage was arranged with the help of Taylor's studio, Metro-Goldwyn-Mayer, a common practice in Hollywood's golden age. Louis B. Mayer had insisted that Stanwyck and Taylor marry and went as far as presiding over arrangements at the wedding. Stanwyck and Taylor enjoyed time together outdoors during the early years of their marriage and owned acres of prime West Los Angeles property. Their large ranch and home in the Mandeville Canyon section of Brentwood, Los Angeles, is still referred to by the locals as "the old Robert Taylor ranch".

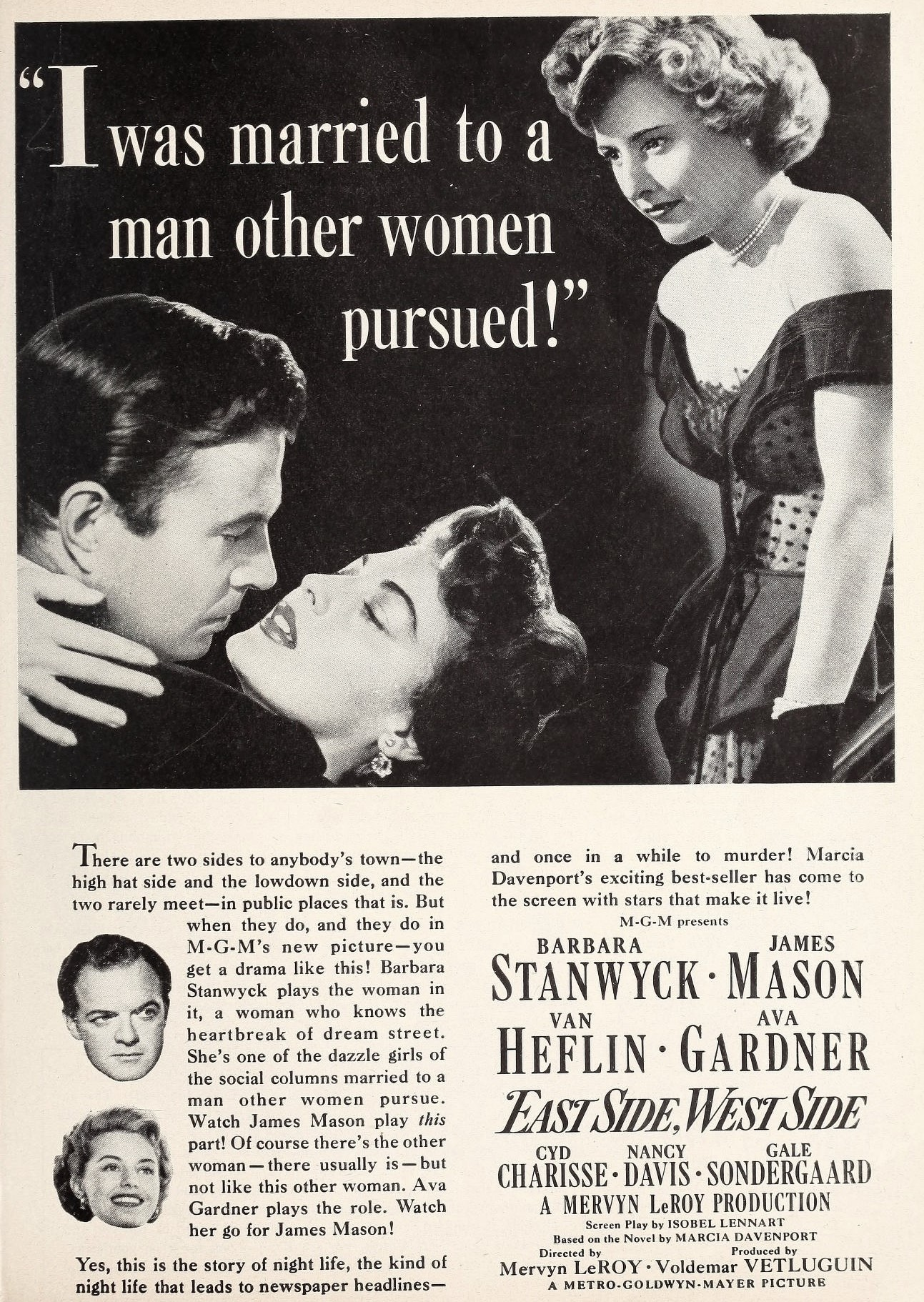
Magazine ad for East Side West Side (1949) starring Stanwyck, James Mason and Ava Gardner

Stanwyck and Taylor decided in 1950 to divorce, and at his insistence, she proceeded with the official filing of the papers. Many rumors exist regarding the cause of the divorce, but after World War II, Taylor attempted to create a life away from the entertainment industry, and Stanwyck did not share that goal. Taylor allegedly had extramarital affairs, and unsubstantiated rumors suggested that Stanwyck had, also. After the divorce, they remained friendly and acted together in Stanwyck's last feature film, The Night Walker (1964). She never remarried. According to her friend and Big Valley co-star Linda Evans, Stanwyck cited Taylor as the love of her life. She took his death in 1969 very hard, and took a long break from film and television work.

Stanwyck was one of the best-liked actresses in Hollywood and maintained friendships with many of her fellow actors (as well as crew members of her films and TV shows), including Joel McCrea and his wife Frances Dee, George Brent, Robert Preston, Henry Fonda (who had a longtime crush on her), James Stewart, Linda Evans, Joan Crawford, Jack Benny and his wife Mary Livingstone, William Holden, Gary Cooper, and Fred MacMurray. During filming of To Please a Lady, Stanwyck refused to leave her African-American maid Harriet Coray in a hotel only for African-American people and insisted that Harriet stay in the same hotel as she did. After much pressure from Stanwyck, Coray was allowed to stay in the best hotel in Indianapolis with Stanwyck and the rest of the cast and crew.

Stanwyck, at age 45, had a four-year romantic affair with 22-year-old actor Robert Wagner that had begun on the set of Titanic (1953) before Stanwyck ended the relationship. The affair is described in Wagner's 2008 memoir Pieces of My Heart:

Barbara and I were together for four years. What ultimately broke it up was the fact that it couldn’t go anywhere—it was a classic backstreet romance. I was going on location to make movies, she was going on location to make movies, and there was no chance of a marriage in that place and time, so it was bound to run out of steam. She finally sat me down and told me that it was too difficult for her. She loved me, but….

I couldn’t argue with her reasoning. There was simply no way we could have been married at that time. I would have always been Mr. Stanwyck, and we both knew it.

And that’s how it came to an end.

=== Political views ===
A conservative Republican, Stanwyck opposed the presidency of Franklin D. Roosevelt. She felt that if someone from her disadvantaged background had risen to success, others should be able to prosper without government intervention or assistance. For Stanwyck, "hard work with the prospect of rich reward was the American way." She became an early member of the Motion Picture Alliance for the Preservation of American Ideals (MPA) after its founding in 1944. The mission of this group was to "combat ... subversive methods [used in the industry] to undermine and change the American way of life." It opposed communist influences in Hollywood. She publicly supported the investigations of the House Un-American Activities Committee, and her husband Robert Taylor testified as a friendly witness. Stanwyck supported Thomas E. Dewey in the 1944 and 1948 United States presidential elections.

A fan of Objectivist author Ayn Rand, Stanwyck persuaded Warner Bros. head Jack L. Warner to purchase the rights to The Fountainhead before it became a bestseller, and she wrote to Rand of her admiration of Atlas Shrugged.

=== Religion ===
Stanwyck was originally a Protestant, and was baptized in June 1916 by the Reverend J. Frederic Berg of the Protestant Dutch Reformed Church. She converted to Roman Catholicism when she married first husband Frank Fay, but does not appear to have remained an adherent after the marriage ended.

=== Brother ===
Stanwyck's older brother, Malcolm Byron Stevens became an actor, using the name Bert Stevens. He appeared mostly in supporting roles, often uncredited. He appeared in two films that starred Stanwyck: The File on Thelma Jordon and No Man of Her Own, both released in 1950.

== Later years and death ==
Stanwyck's retirement years were active, with charity work outside the limelight.

In 1981, in her home in the exclusive Trousdale section of Beverly Hills, she was awakened during the night by an intruder who struck her on the head with his flashlight, forced her into a closet, and absconded with $40,000 in jewelry.

In 1982, while filming The Thorn Birds, Stanwyck inhaled special-effects smoke on the set that may have caused her to contract bronchitis, which was compounded by her cigarette-smoking habit. She began smoking at the age of nine and stopped just four years before her death.

Stanwyck died on January 20, 1990, at the age of 82, from congestive heart failure and chronic obstructive pulmonary disease at Saint John's Health Center in Santa Monica, California. She had indicated that she wanted no funeral service. In accordance with her wishes, her remains were cremated and the ashes scattered from a helicopter over Lone Pine, California, where she had made some of her Western films.

== Awards and nominations ==
Association	Year	Category	Work	Result	Ref(s)
Academy Awards	1938	Best Actress in a Leading Role	Stella Dallas	Nominated	
Academy Awards	1942	Best Actress in a Leading Role	Ball of Fire	Nominated	
Academy Awards	1945	Best Actress in a Leading Role	Double Indemnity	Nominated	
Academy Awards	1949	Best Actress in a Leading Role	Sorry, Wrong Number	Nominated	
Academy Awards	1982	Honorary Award		Honored	
Primetime Emmy Awards	1961	Outstanding Performance by an Actress in a Series	The Barbara Stanwyck Show	Won	
Primetime Emmy Awards	1966	Outstanding Continued Performance by an Actress in a Leading Role	The Big Valley	Won	
Primetime Emmy Awards	1967	Outstanding Continued Performance by an Actress in a Leading Role	The Big Valley	Nominated	
Primetime Emmy Awards	1968	Outstanding Continued Performance by an Actress in a Leading Role	The Big Valley	Nominated	
Primetime Emmy Awards	1983	Outstanding Lead Actress in a Limited Series	The Thorn Birds	Won	
Golden Globes	1966	Best TV Star – Female	The Big Valley	Nominated	
Golden Globes	1967	Best TV Star – Female	The Big Valley	Nominated	
Golden Globes	1968	Best TV Star – Female	The Big Valley	Nominated	
Golden Globes	1984	Best Performance by an Actress in a Supporting Role on Television	The Thorn Birds	Won	
Golden Globes	1986	Cecil B. DeMille Award		Honored	
Hollywood Walk of Fame	1960	Motion Pictures, 1751 Vine Street		Honored	
Screen Actors Guild	1967	Life Achievement		Honored	
Hall of Great Western Performers Cowboy Hall of Fame Oklahoma City	1973	Lifetime Achievement Award Performer		Honored	
Film Society of Lincoln Center Gala Tribute	1981			Honored	
Los Angeles Film Critics Association	1981	Career Achievement		Honored	
American Film Institute	1987	Life Achievement		Honored	
