= Broadway Nights =

1927 film

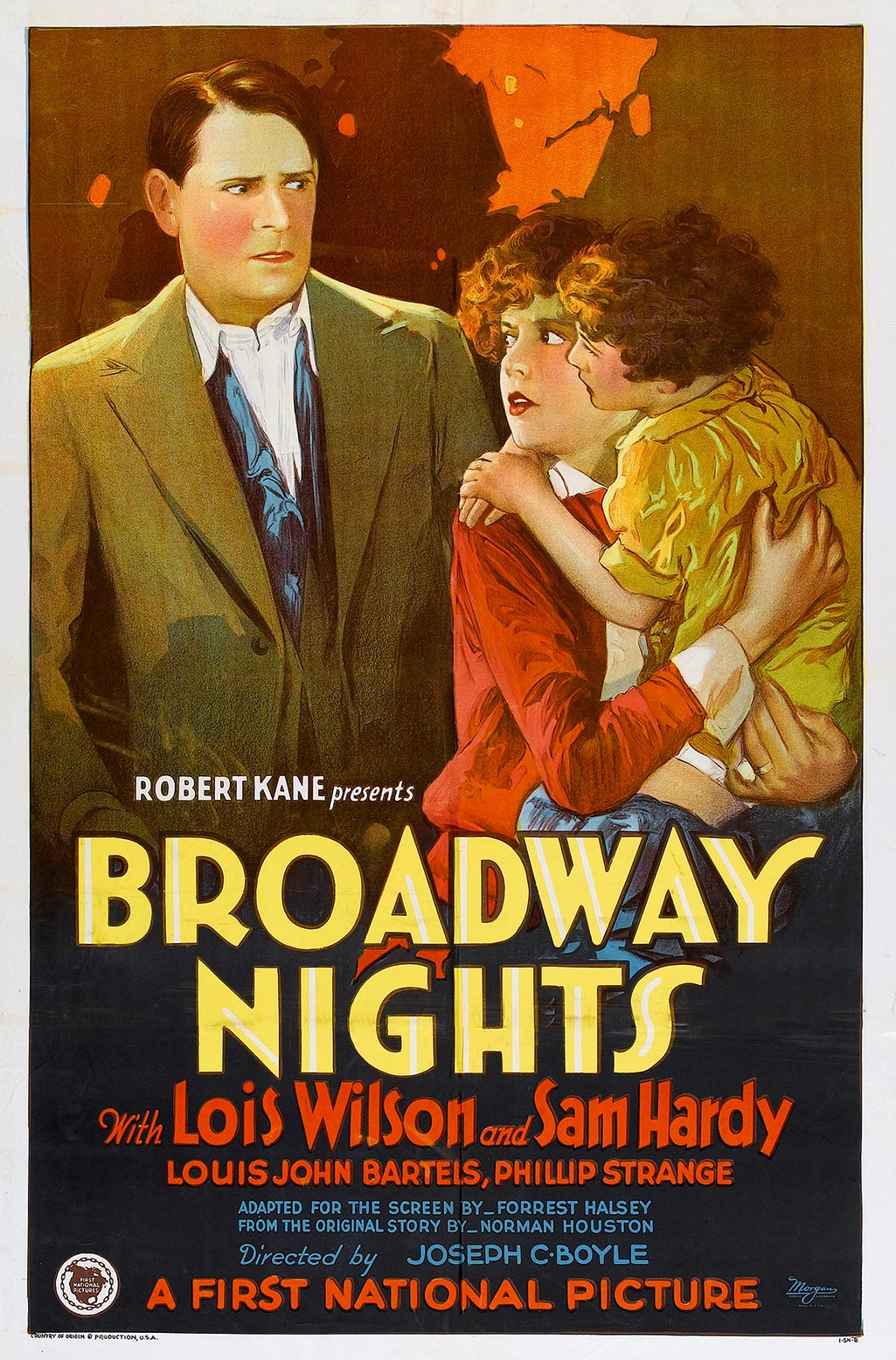
- Theatrical release poster
- Directed by: Joseph C. Boyle
- Written by: John W. Conway; Forrest Halsey
- Story by: Norman Houston
- Produced by: Robert Kane
- Starring: Lois Wilson; Sam Hardy
- Cinematography: Ernest Haller
- Edited by: Paul F. Maschke
- Production company: Robert Kane Productions
- Distributed by: First National Pictures
- Release date: May 15, 1927
- Running time: 72 minutes
- Country: United States
- Language: Silent (English intertitles)

Broadway Nights is a lost 1927 American silent romantic drama film directed by Joseph C. Boyle. It was the film debut of June Collyer, Barbara Stanwyck, Sylvia Sidney and Ann Sothern.

== Cast ==
- Sam Hardy as Johnny Fay
- Lois Wilson as Fanny Franchette
- Philip Strange as Bronson
- De Sacia Mooers as Texas Guinan
- Barbara Stanwyck and Ann Sothern as fan dancers
- June Collyer and Sylvia Sidney as themselves

== Reception ==
In a contemporary review, critic May Tinee of the Chicago Tribune wrote: "This story of stage life and stage people, author and director presented with genuine insight and understanding. It was full of 'atmosphere' and as human as could be."

== Preservation ==
With no holdings located in archives, Broadway Nights is considered a lost film.
