= Hotel Berlin =

1945 film

- Poster from Hotel Berlin
- Directed by: Peter Godfrey
- Written by: Alvah Bessie; Jo Pagano
- Based on: Hotel Berlin; 1943 novel by Vicki Baum
- Produced by: Louis F. Edelman
- Starring: Faye Emerson; Helmut Dantine; Raymond Massey; Andrea King
- Cinematography: Carl E. Guthrie
- Edited by: Frederick Richards
- Music by: Franz Waxman
- Distributed by: Warner Bros. Pictures
- Release date: March 2, 1945
- Running time: 98 minutes
- Country: United States
- Language: English
- Budget: $940,000
- Box office: $2,840,000

Hotel Berlin is an American drama film made by Warner Bros. Pictures in late 1944 to early 1945 starring Faye Emerson, Helmut Dantine, Raymond Massey and Andrea King. Directed by Peter Godfrey, it is set in Berlin near the close of World War II, and is based on the novel Hotel Berlin by Vicki Baum.

Baum had previously written the World War I epic Menschen im Hotel, adapted to film as Grand Hotel (1932).

== Plot ==
Towards the end of World War II, the lives of various desperate people intersect at the Hotel Berlin, a hotbed of Nazis, officers, spies and ordinary Germans trying to weather the inevitable defeat. Martin Richter, a leader of the German underground who has escaped from Dachau concentration camp, is hiding there, aided by some of the staff. He is hunted by SS-Gruppenführer Joachim Helm, who has his headquarters in the same building. Another hotel guest is Nobel laureate Johannes Koenig, Richter's friend from before the war and in Dachau.

General Arnim von Dahnwitz, the last of the leaders of a plot against Hitler still at large, goes to his friend von Stetten to see if his clique can help him, but is told that nothing can be done. He has at best 24 hours to shoot himself and save the Nazi regime the embarrassment of publicly dealing with him. At the hotel, von Dahnwitz encounters Lisel Dorn, his lover and a famous actress. He asks Dorn to marry him and flee with him to Sweden, but she is aware his situation is hopeless and declines. Later, von Dahnwitz commits suicide.

Meanwhile, von Stetten is arranging for the escape of his group to North America, where they hope to secretly rebuild their strength for another grab at power. He invites Koenig to join them (to provide a cover for their activities).

Hotel "hostess" (and informant) Tillie Weiler warmly greets Major Kauders, a pilot determined to make the fullest use of a short leave. They quarrel and part when he finds her photograph of a man who he thinks looks Jewish. Later, Sarah Baruch comes to her and begs her help in getting medicine for her husband, dying of cancer. The older woman also reveals that her son Max, Tillie's former employer and love, is alive, having been liberated from a labor camp by the Allies. When they take shelter from an air raid in the basement, Sarah is recognized by Hermann Plotke, who orders her to put on the Star of David badge required of all Jews. This is too much for Tillie, who reveals to all that Plotke used to work in the Bauers' department store, until he was caught stealing. Max gave him another chance, only to have Plotke appropriate the business when the Nazis came to power. Plotke orders her arrest, but is himself taken into custody for stealing from the government.

Richter is given a waiter's uniform and sent to serve dinner to Dorn in her suite. When she becomes suspicious, he is forced to reveal his identity. She offers to assist him in exchange for her own passage out of Germany. Later, however, Tillie snoops in Dorn's suite (not only envious of her extensive wardrobe, but seeking a pair of shoes) and finds a suspicious discarded waiter's jacket, which she reports to Helm. Helm captures Richter by himself, but Richter is able to disarm and overpower him. He throws Helm down the shaft of a disabled elevator. Though the hotel is surrounded, Dorn persuades admirer Major Kauders to escort a seemingly drunk Richter (now in an SS uniform) through the cordon. When Richter sends word where to meet him, however, Dorn betrays him. She is suspected, and her phone call to Von Stetten is overheard. As a result, she is taken to the underground headquarters as a prisoner. Despite her desperate attempts to justify herself, Richter shoots her.

== Cast ==
- Faye Emerson as Tillie Weiler
- Helmut Dantine as Martin Richter
- Raymond Massey as General Arnim von Dahnwitz
- Andrea King as Lisel Dorn
- Peter Lorre as Johannes Koenig
- Alan Hale as Hermann Plottke
- George Coulouris as SS-Gruppenführer Joachim Helm
- Henry Daniell as Von Stetten
- Peter Whitney as Heinrichs
- Helene Thimig as Sarah Baruch
- Steven Geray as Kleibert, the hotel manager
- Kurt Kreuger as Major Kauders
- Erwin Kalser as Dr. Dorf, the hotel physician

== Production ==
The picture was in production between November 15, 1944, and January 15, 1945. According to TCM and AFI, the end date is uncertain.

Warner Bros. rushed the release of the picture to coincide with the Russian and Allied drives on Berlin. The story was updated to include late war events during the spring of 1945.

The film ends with a statement over the signatures of Winston Churchill, Franklin D. Roosevelt and Joseph Stalin: "Our purpose is not to destroy the German people—but we are determined to disband all German armed forces-break up the German General Staff—eliminate all German industry used for military production--bring all war criminals to just and swift punishment—wipe out the Nazi Party and Nazi laws from the life of the German people—Germany must never again disturb the peace of the world." This appears to be a paraphrase of the statement made after the February 1945 Yalta Conference.

Film critic Michael Atkinson observes: "for most of the world in early 1945 the concentration camps were still just a rumor, but here characters talk in ominous terms about Dachau and Birkenau, whose gas chambers were claimed in the picture to kill '6,000 people in 24 hours!', in a movie that hit theaters one month before Auschwitz and Dachau were liberated and exposed to the world."

According to a press release, Andrea King and Faye Emerson were coached in their German accents by Trude Berliner, a refugee who had been imprisoned in a Nazi concentration camp.

Technical advisor Roger Neury was identified as the maître d'hotel at the Mocambo nightclub in West Hollywood, California, and former maître d' at Berlin's famous Adlon Hotel before the war.

Elliott Roosevelt, son of President Franklin D. Roosevelt, married Faye Emerson during filming, on December 3, 1944. Despite the film being an ensemble piece, Emerson received top billing.

== Reception ==
=== Box office ===
According to Warner Bros records the film earned $1,790,000 domestically and $1,050,000 foreign.

=== Reviews ===
Variety gave the film its highest praise, succinctly describing it as "socko". In the Los Angeles Evening Herald-Express, Harrison Carroll raved the film was "like seeing the whole high German kit and caboodle dropped like rats in a barrel with a terrier on their necks.

On the other hand, New York Times critic Bosley Crowther chastised the picture's creators for presenting sympathetic German characters, in both his March 3, 1945, review of the film and in a March 11, 1945, article headlined “EIN VOLK IN FILM”, in which he takes the makers of Lifeboat, The Seventh Cross, Tomorrow the World and this film to task for “giving our very real enemies...a sizeable break.” James Agee writing in The Nation in 1945 characterized it as "the most heavily routine of Warner Brothers' political melodramas ... "

Writing for TCM, film critic Michael Atkinson talks about the film's departure from Hollywood's rigidly anti-German approach at the time. “(Baum) apparently felt no need for broad-brush stereotypes, and neither does Hotel Berlin – remarkably, here we have one of the very few Hollywood films made and set during WWII in which every single character, sympathetic, villainous or caught somewhere in the middle, is German... making its case that the German people in general (should be) regarded as victims as well... Hotel Berlin gives extraordinary depth and empathy to every German on its docket.. Still, the centerpiece of Hotel Berlin might belong to Lorre, who has an enormous, seven-minute scene in which his booze-sodden man of science debates with Dantine's idealistic rebel about the usefulness of fighting, and the hopelessness of being German, in the face of so much malice and death and suffering...”

Observing that a “good cast makes it generally interesting”, Leonard Maltin gives the picture 2.5 out of 4 stars. British critic Leslie Halliwell wrote: "After five years of total war this view of life on the other side can hardly fail to be unconvincing, but the actors gleefully seize on moments of melodrama."

== Home media ==
It is available on DVD of Warner Brothers Archive Collection.
