= Grand Hotel (play) =

Play by Edward Knoblock

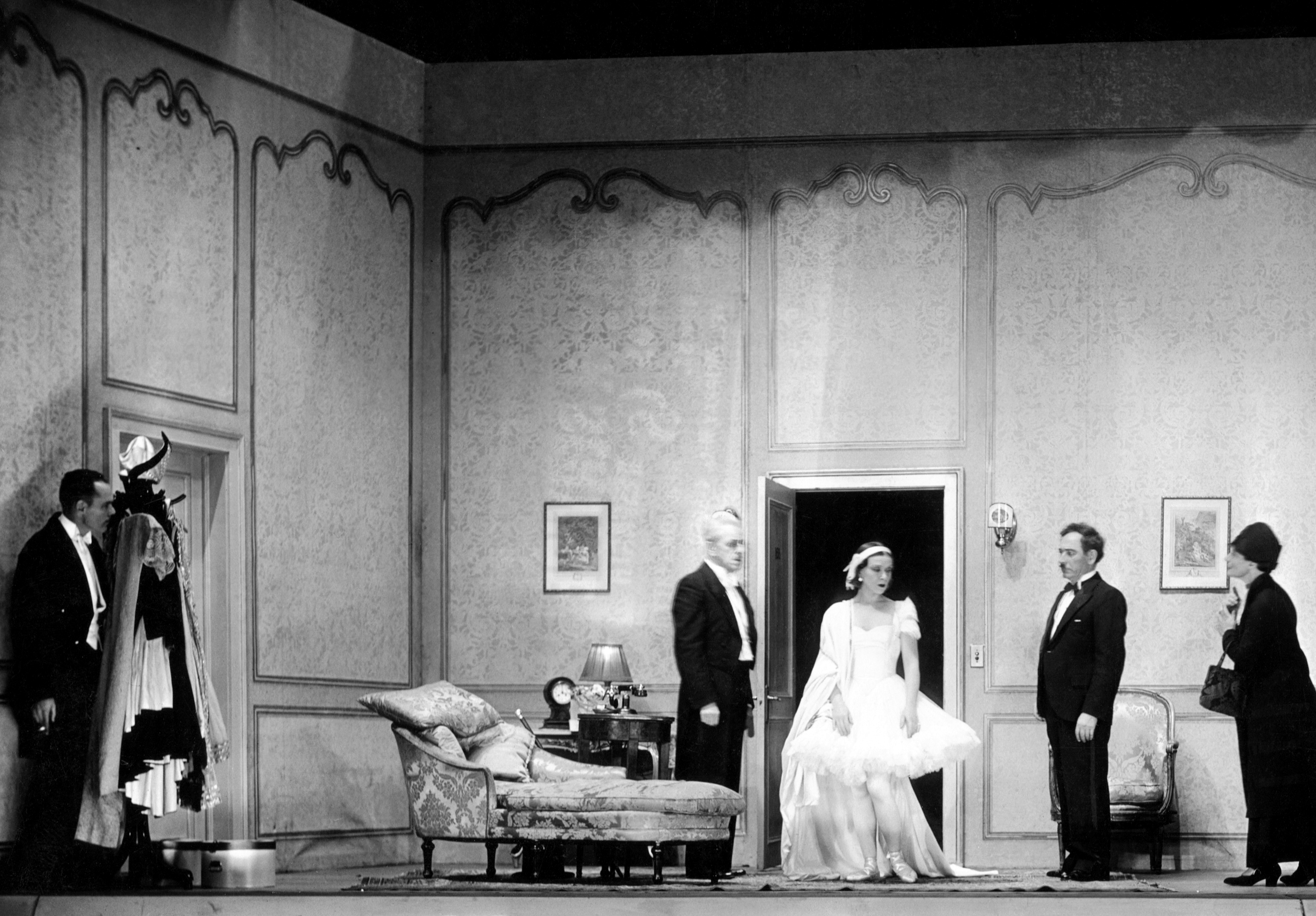
- Promotional photograph of the original Broadway production of Grand Hotel (1930)
- Written by: Edward Knoblock
- Original language: English
- Genre: Drama

Premiere
- Date premiered: 3 September 1931
- Place premiered: Adelphi Theatre, London

Grand Hotel is a 1931 play by the British-American writer Edward Knoblock. A drama, it is based on the 1929 German novel Grand Hotel by Vicki Baum about guests staying at a Grand Hotel in Berlin.

It ran for 147 performances at the Adelphi Theatre in London's West End between September 1931 and January 1932. The cast included Hugh Williams, Ursula Jeans, Elena Miramova, Lyn Harding, George Merritt and Everley Gregg. Its release was pushed back several times. Much of the play's appeal revolved around its large cast and special effects.

A separate American stage version was written by William A. Drake and ran on Broadway from November 1930 to December 1931. It was elements of this play that were used for the 1932 Metro-Goldwyn-Mayer film adaptation.

== Bibliography ==
- Wearing, J. P. The London Stage 1930-1939: A Calendar of Productions, Performers, and Personnel. Rowman & Littlefield, 2014.
