= Not Wanted on Voyage (disambiguation) =

Not Wanted on Voyage is a 1957 British comedy film.

Not Wanted on Voyage may also refer to:

- Treachery on the High Seas, a 1936 British comedy crime film
- Not Wanted on the Voyage, a 1985 novel by Canadian author Timothy Findley
