= Strange Justice =

Strange Justice may refer to:

- Strange Justice (1999 film), a television film
- Strange Justice (1932 film), an American pre-Code drama film
- Strange Justice: The Selling of Clarence Thomas, a 1994 book by Jane Mayer and Jill Abramson
