= William A. Drake =

American screenwriter

William A. Drake (December 9, 1899 – October 28, 1965), was an American screenwriter, playwright, and translator. He translated several German language plays for Broadway, and also adapted several German language works for the stage, including Vicki Baum's novel Grand Hotel. He subsequently adapted his stage play version of Baum's book into the 1932 film Grand Hotel, which won the Academy Award for Best Picture. He also wrote several screenplays for RKO Pictures.

== Life and career ==
William Absalom Drake was born in Dayton, Ohio, United States on December 9, 1899. He translated Franz Werfel's German-language play Schweiger into English for Broadway. It premiered at the Mansfield Theatre on March 23, 1926. This was followed by a translation of another German language play, Bruno Frank's 12,000, which Drake penned for a production at the Garrick Theatre in 1928.

Drake adapted Vicki Baum's Grand Hotel into a play of the same name. It premiered at the National Theatre on November 13, 1930. A hit, it ran for 459 performances; closing in December 1931. Drake subsequently adapted his play into the 1932 film Grand Hotel which won the Academy Award for Best Picture. The film was in turn the basis for the 1989 musical Grand Hotel by playwright Luther Davis and songwriters Robert Wright and George Forrest.

Drake adapted another German-language play for Broadway, Wilhelm Speyer's Ein Mantel, ein Hut, ein Handschuh (English A Hat, a Coat, a Glove), which was staged at the Selwyn Theatre in 1934. His play was subsequently used as a basis for the 1934 film Hat, Coat, and Glove. He also contributed to the English language libretto of Kurt Weill's opera The Eternal Road which was initially written in German by Franz Werfel and translated by Ludwig Lewisohn. Leisohn's English translation was further adapted and modified by Drake prior to the opera's world premiere in English at the Manhattan Opera House on January 7, 1937.

Drake work as a screenwriter for RKO Pictures. He penned an original screenplay for the films Strange Justice (1932). His screenplay for the film Goldie Gets Along (1931) was adapted from the novel of the same name by Hawthorne Hurst. With Edwin Blum he co-wrote the screenplay to The Adventures of Sherlock Holmes (1939) which was based on the works by Sir Arthur Conan Doyle. He collaborated with several writers to adapt Alexandre Dumas's 1844 novel The Three Musketeers into the 1939 film of that name.

He died in Los Angeles, California on October 28, 1965.
