= The Red Needle =

1951 film directed by Emil-Edwin Reinert

- Directed by: Emil-Edwin Reinert
- Written by: Vicki Baum (short story); André Haguet; André Legrand; Jacques Natanson
- Produced by: Paul-Edmond Decharme
- Starring: Michel Auclair; Michèle Philippe; Jean Marchat
- Cinematography: André Bac
- Edited by: Monique Kirsanoff
- Music by: Joe Hajos
- Production companies: Alcina; National-Film
- Distributed by: DisCina
- Release date: 7 June 1951
- Running time: 85 minutes
- Countries: France; West Germany
- Language: French

The Red Needle (French: L'aiguille rouge, German: Verträumte Tage) is a 1951 French-West German drama film directed by Emil-Edwin Reinert and starring Michel Auclair, Michèle Philippe and Jean Marchat. It was shot at the Joinville Studios in Paris and the Bavaria Studios in Munich. The film's sets were designed by the art director Georges Wakhévitch. The film was partly shot on location in Mittenwald and the Bavarian Alps. It was based on a story by Vicki Baum. A separate German version, Dreaming Days, was made with a different cast.

== Cast ==
- Michel Auclair as Florian Faber
- Michèle Philippe as Maya Berger
- Jean Marchat as Berger
- Margo Lion as Fanny
- René Génin as Henri
- Colette Jacommet as Maya, enfant
- Claude Maritz as Hans, le guide

== Bibliography ==
- Krautz, Alfred. International directory of cinematographers set- and costume designers in film. Saur, 1983.
