= Dreaming Days =

1951 film directed by Emil-Edwin Reinert

- Directed by: Emil-Edwin Reinert
- Written by: Vicki Baum (story); Erich Kröhnke; Emil E. Reinert; Johannes Mario Simmel
- Starring: Aglaja Schmid; O.W. Fischer; Axel von Ambesser
- Cinematography: André Bac; Bertl Höcht
- Music by: Joe Hajos
- Production companies: Alcina; National-Film
- Distributed by: Neue Filmverleih
- Release date: 17 August 1951
- Running time: 78 minutes
- Countries: France; West Germany
- Language: German

Dreaming Days (German: Verträumte Tage) is a 1951 French-West German drama film directed by Emil-Edwin Reinert and starring Aglaja Schmid, O.W. Fischer and Axel von Ambesser. The film is based on a short story by Vicki Baum. It was shot at the Bavaria Studios in Munich and the Joinville Studios in Paris. The film's sets were designed by the art director Georges Wakhévitch. Location shooting took place around Mittenwald, Lautersee, Garmisch-Partenkirchen and Kreuzeck. A separate French version, The Red Needle, was also made, with different actors.

== Synopsis ==
Maja Berger is staying in the Bavarian Alps to recover her health. She is visited occasionally by her husband but is deeply lonely. Then she encounters Florian, a young doctor, who is mountaineering in the district. They fall in love and plan to elope. Before he leaves he wants to climb a particular peak one last time. Having made a successful ascent, he is caught in a violent storm on the way down and is killed.

== Cast ==
- Aglaja Schmid as Maja Berger
- O.W. Fischer as Florian Faber
- Axel von Ambesser as Herr Berger
- Josef Sieber as Heinrich Langkofler
- Claude Maritz as Bergführer
- Margo Lion as Fanni Langkofler
- Hildegard Kleinkemm as Trude Langkofler

== Bibliography ==
- Bock, Hans-Michael & Bergfelder, Tim. The Concise CineGraph. Encyclopedia of German Cinema. Berghahn Books, 2009.
