= Goldie Gets Along =

1933 film

- Directed by: Malcolm St. Clair
- Written by: William A. Drake
- Based on: Goldie Gets Along by Hawthorne Hurst
- Produced by: J. G. Bachmann
- Starring: Lili Damita; Charles Morton; Sam Hardy
- Cinematography: Merritt B. Gerstad
- Edited by: William Morgan
- Music by: Howard Jackson
- Production company: J. G. Bachmann Productions
- Distributed by: RKO Radio Pictures
- Release date: January 27, 1933
- Running time: 68 minutes
- Country: United States
- Language: English

Goldie Gets Along is a 1933 American pre-Code comedy film directed by Malcolm St. Clair and starring Lili Damita, Charles Morton and Sam Hardy. The screenplay was written by William A. Drake, based on the 1931 novel of the same title by Hawthorne Hurst.

== Plot ==
A young Frenchwoman living with her aunt and uncle in New Jersey has ambitions of making it in Hollywood and sets out to hitchhike her way there. Her adventures involve her briefly being sent to jail for stealing a car and taking part in a series of crooked beauty contests. Eventually she makes it to Hollywood and tries to target a contract with a big film director, discovering in the process that the fiancée she left at home is now a big movie star.

== Cast ==
- Lili Damita as Goldie LaFarge
- Charles Morton as Bill Tobin
- Sam Hardy as Sam Muldoon
- Nat Pendleton as Motorcycle Officer Cassidy
- Lita Chevret as Marie Gardner
- Arthur Hoyt as Mayor Silas C. Simms
- Henry Fink as Bob Flynn
- Bradley Page as Frank Hawthorne
- Lee Moran as Sam Kaplan
- Reginald Barlow as Uncle Saunders
- Jane Keckley as Aunt Saunders
- Harry Bowen as Fred
- Gertrude Sutton as Esther
- Dell Henderson as Mr. Moon
- Leonard Sillman as Amorous Motorist
- June Brewster as Nurse
- Russ Powell as Saunders' Brother
- Martha Mattox as Saunders' Sister-in-Law
- Helen Parrish as Saunders' Child
- Joan Standing as Mayor's Secretary
- Walter Brennan as Stuttering Waiter
- Bert Moorhouse as Receptionist

== Reception ==
Variety magazine, in its June 6, 1933 issue, praised St. Clair and cinematographer Merritt B. Gerstad’s “ingenious” camera work particularly in rendering the “Hollywood scene very effectively though camera angles.” Variety noted use of masks or mattes served to advance the narrative and theme of the picture.

== Theme ==
The characterization of Goldie LaFarge, a French immigrant, anticipates the feminist ideals that arose in the post-war era. Film historian Ruth Anne Dwyer considers this fictional character “an early version of today’s feminist.” Dwyer writes:

Goldie Gets Along, a charming and remarkable film, espouses female independence in a manner which women of today would herald as unique for American film…She believes in her own intelligence and talent, and happily postpones what everyone else feel she must (italics) want: a marriage to a handsome suitor and marital life in a small town.

Dwyer adds that Goldie, in her determination to succeed in Hollywood, skilfully neutralizes efforts to derail her ambitions, “battling sexual harassment at every train depot, [doing so] by appearing to pander to, but in fact, outwitting, all of the men around her.”

== Bibliography ==
- Goble, Alan. The Complete Index to Literary Sources in Film. Walter de Gruyter, 1999.
- Tice, Karen W. Queens of Academe: Beauty Pageantry, Student Bodies, and College Life. Oxford University Press, 2012.
