= Max Fenichel =

Austrian photographer (1885–1942)

Max Fenichel (2 July 1885 in Tarnów, Austria-Hungary – 16 September 1942 in the Łódź Ghetto), also known as Maximilian Fenichel and Menasche (or Menasse) Fenichel, was an Austrian photographer.

== Biography ==
Menasche Fenichel, professionally known as Max Fenichel, moved to Vienna at the beginning of the First World War. He worked as a photographer in Vienna from 1915 to 1938. His first studio was located at Stolzenthalergasse 22 and then from 1917 in Gaullachergasse 13. His wife, Leopoldine (nee Hirsch), had been born in Vienna on 20 February 1893.

He shot photos for the daily newspaper Die Stunde (The Hour) and the magazine Die Bühne (The Stage). His photojournalism was also published in Wiener Illustrierten Zeitung, Mikrophon, Illustrierte Kronen Zeitung, Moderne Welt, Österreichische Illustrierte Zeitung, Radio Wien, Wiener Bilder and Das interessante Blatt.

Fenichel was a member of the Genossenschaft der Photographen in Wien (Vienna Photographic Cooperative) and the Organisation der Wiener Presse (Vienna Press Association).

He also shot formal portraits in his studio, especially of professionals such as rabbis, writers, artists, and performers. Among those who sat for him were the writers Vicki Baum and Ernst Lissauer, Rabbi Max Grunwald, and the painter Ludwig Michalek.

== Fate under the Nazis ==
Fenichel was Jewish, and after the annexation of Austria by the Nazis in 1938 he had to give up his photo studio. He and his wife were deported to the Lodz ghetto on 19 October 1941 on Transport 7, Train Da 5. Both were murdered in September 1942.

Photos

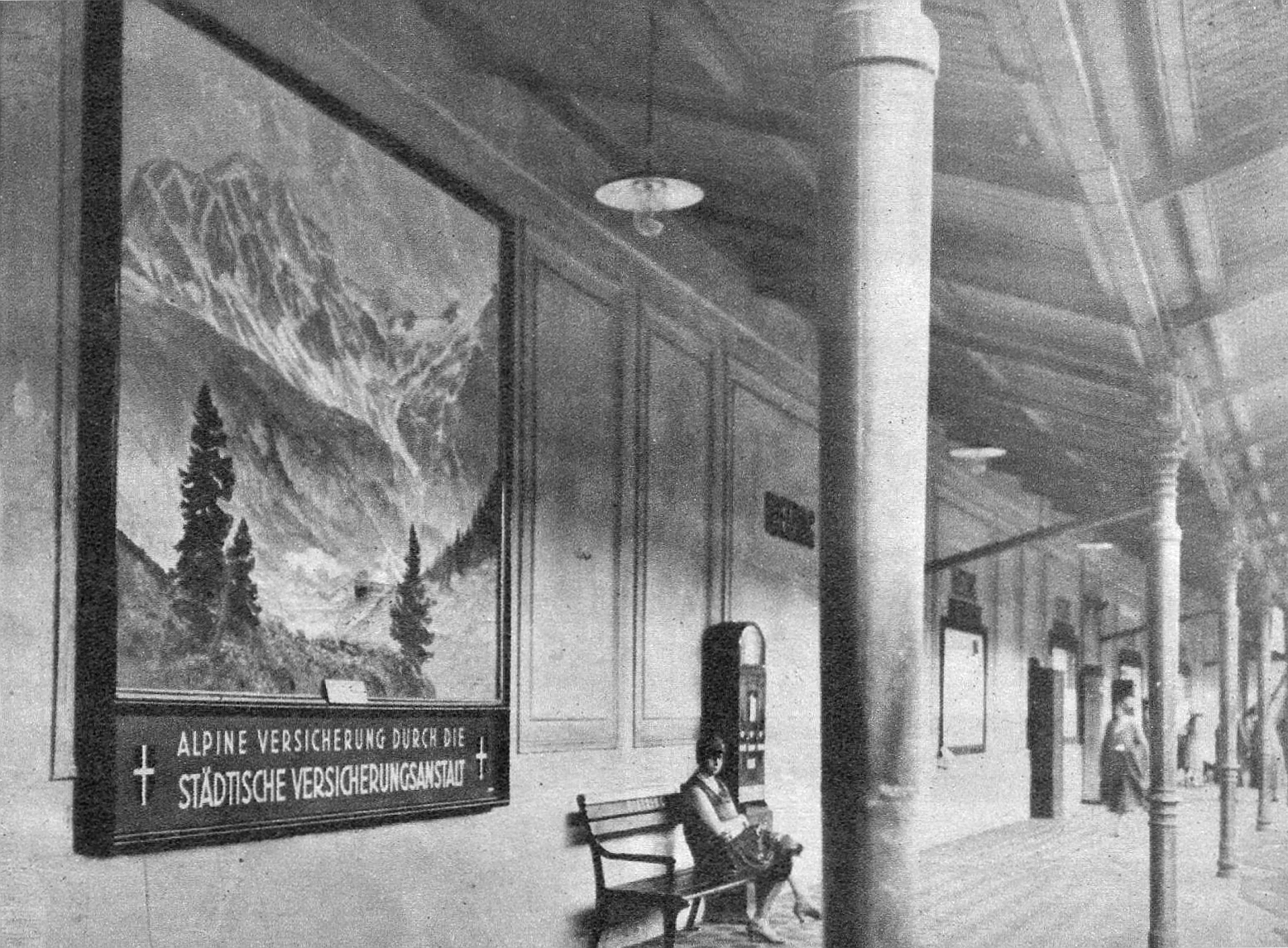
Vienna Stadtbahn Station Hietzing (1929)

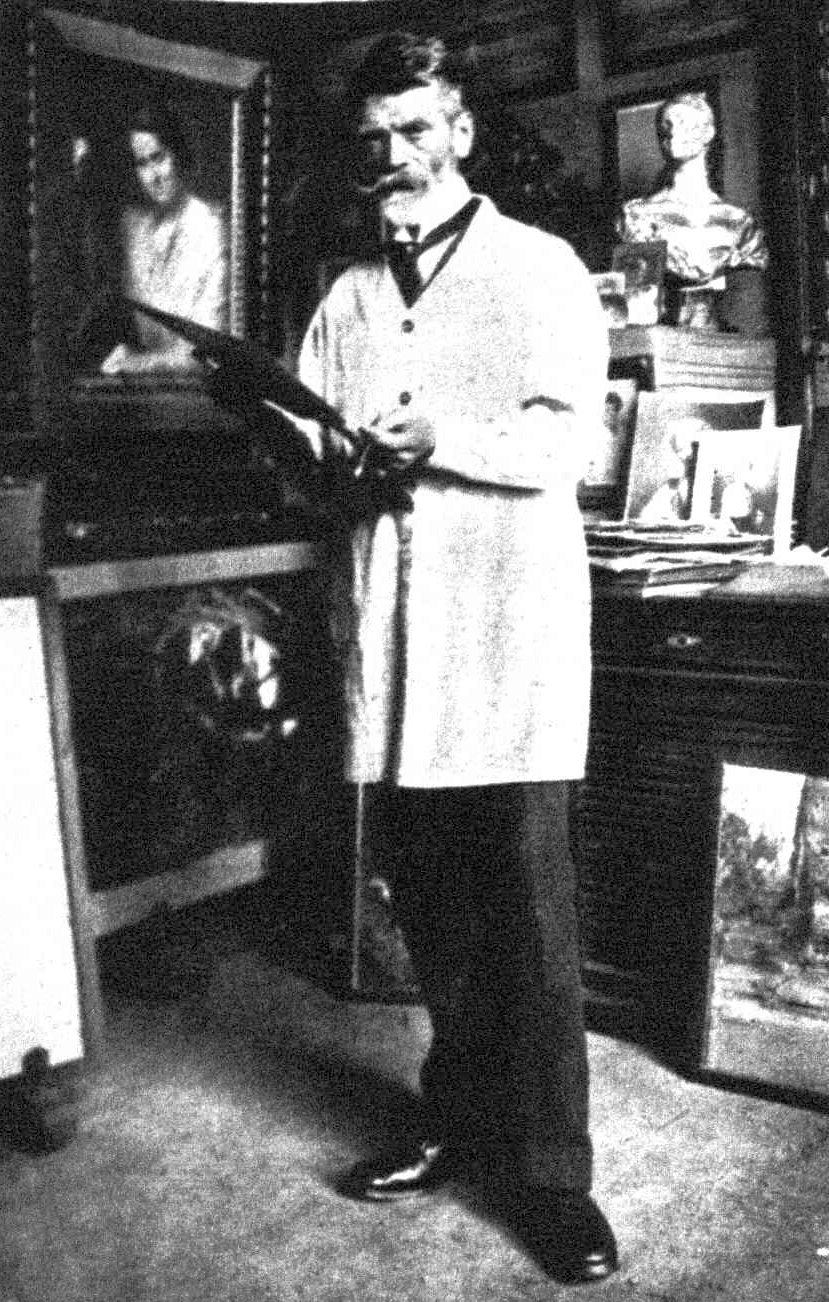
Portrait of painter Ludwig Michalek by Max Fenichel, 1919

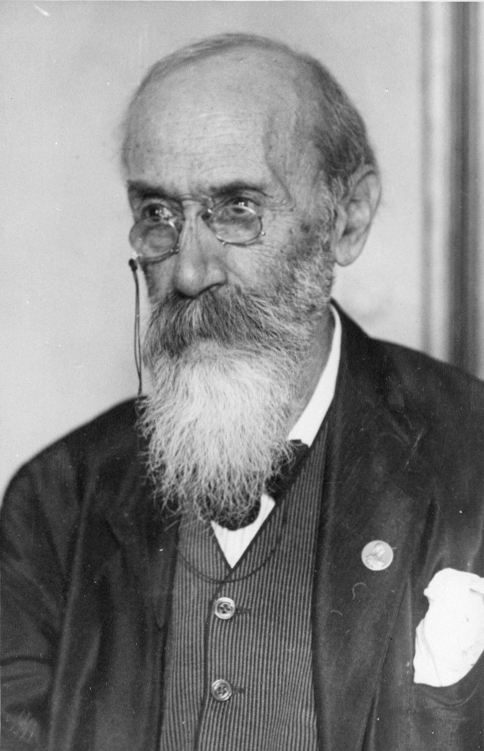
Max von Portheim (undated)

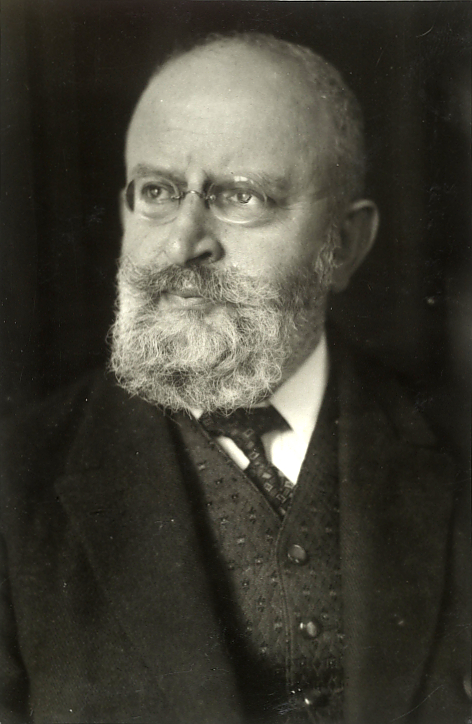
Portrait of Rabbi Max Grunwald

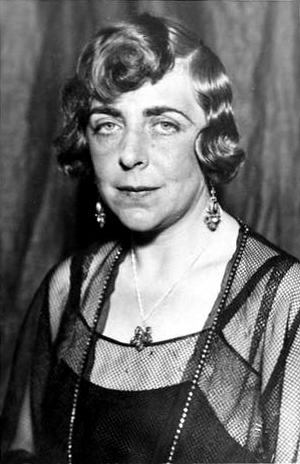
Vicki Baum (um 1930)

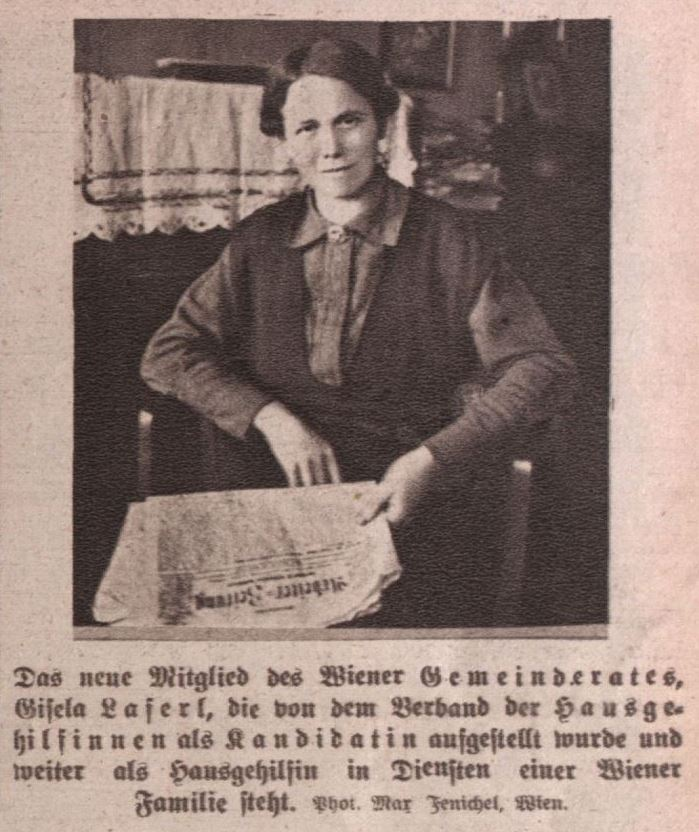
Gisela Laferl (1919)
