= Hotel Berlin (novel) =

1943 novel by Vicki Baum

- 1946 British edition
- Author: Vicki Baum
- Language: English
- Genre: Drama
- Publisher: Doubleday (US); Michael Joseph (UK)
- Publication date: 1943
- Publication place: United States
- Media type: Print

Hotel Berlin is 1943 novel by the Austrian-born writer Vicki Baum. She had fled into exile following the Nazi takeover. The novel is set in a luxury hotel in Berlin during the later stages of the Second World War. It echoes the theme of Baum's best-known novel Grand Hotel which was first published in 1929 on the brink of the Great Depression. Some editions are entitled Hotel Berlín 1943 and others Berlin Hotel.

== Film adaptation ==
In 1945 it was made into a Hollywood film of the same title by the major studio Warner Brothers. Directed by Peter Godfrey and featuring an ensemble cast including Faye Emerson, Helmut Dantine, Raymond Massey, Andrea King and Peter Lorre.

== Bibliography ==
- Goble, Alan. The Complete Index to Literary Sources in Film. Walter de Gruyter, 1999.
