= A Woman's Secret =

1949 film by Nicholas Ray

- Theatrical release poster
- Directed by: Nicholas Ray
- Screenplay by: Herman J. Mankiewicz
- Based on: Mortgage on Life; 1946 novel by Vicki Baum
- Produced by: Herman J. Mankiewicz
- Starring: Maureen O'Hara; Melvyn Douglas; Gloria Grahame
- Cinematography: George E. Diskant
- Edited by: Sherman Todd
- Music by: Friedrich Hollaender
- Distributed by: RKO Radio Pictures
- Release date: February 7, 1949 (US)
- Running time: 84 minutes
- Country: United States
- Language: English

A Woman's Secret is a 1949 American mystery film starring Maureen O'Hara, Gloria Grahame and Melvyn Douglas. Directed by Nicholas Ray, it was written and produced by Herman J. Mankiewicz based on the novel Mortgage on Life by Vicki Baum.

== Plot ==
Singing sensation Estrellita (Susan Crenshaw) decides to quit the business. After a quarrel with her mentor, Marian Washburn, she is shot and seriously wounded in the Park Avenue apartment the two women share. When the police arrive, Marian confesses.

Marian’s accompanist and boyfriend, pianist Luke Jordan, believes there must be more to this. He hires attorney Brook Matthews, who has a past relationship with Susan, and explains at length to Police Inspector Fowler, a sympathetic ear, how he and Marion came to know Susan.

In a series of flashbacks Luke relates how rags-to-riches star Marian lost her voice.

After an audition where Luke had played for prospective talent, Susan, then an aspiring singer from smalltown California, collapsed from starvation in front of him and Marian. The couple took her home to take care of her, and heard her voice - astoundingly sultry, and according to Luke “drenched in hormones“. They decided to promote Susan's career, with the affluent Marian taking her to Paris to study voice and acquire the patina of culture.

Overwhelmed by it all, and fed up with Marian, Susan fled to Algiers with a French shoe salesman and his empty promise of an opera lead there. Luke retrieved her, and on the ocean voyage home he and Marian secure a stateside debut for Susan by ensnaring their mark, bachelor heir and theater dilettante Brook Matthews. Future star “Estrellita” is born. Susan and Brook embark on a relationship, spiked in advance by Brook’s overprotective mother.

Back in the present Susan fights for her life in a hospital. Outside her room, Luke meets abrasive stranger Lee Crenshaw, who is also anxious to see and speak to her at the first opportunity.

It turns out Crenshaw is a mysterious soldier whom both Marian and Susan met in France several years earlier. Susan had recently been in New Orleans to perform at a benefit for his unit’s reunion. Overcome with romance and alcohol, she had secretly married him. Realizing the impact of her impetuous decision and still being in love with Brooke, Susan tried to commit suicide. Her gun went off as Marian struggled to wrestle it away. All the time Marian was seeking to cover for her.

== Cast ==
- Maureen O'Hara as Marian Washburn
- Melvyn Douglas as Luke Jordan
- Gloria Grahame as Susan Caldwell / Estrellita
- Bill Williams as Lee Crenshaw
- Victor Jory as Brook Matthews
- Mary Philips as Mrs. Mary Fowler
- Jay C. Flippen as Police Inspector Jim Fowler
- Robert Warwick as Assistant District Attorney Roberts
- Curt Conway as Doctor
- Ann Shoemaker as Mrs. Matthews, Brook's Mother
- Virginia Farmer as Mollie, the Washburn Maid
- Ellen Corby as Nurse
- Emory Parnell as Police Lieutenant at Desk
- Paul Guilfoyle as Radio Program Moderator (uncredited)

== Reception ==
=== Box office ===
The film recorded a loss of $760,000.

=== Critical response ===
When the film was released, Variety magazine gave it a mixed review, writing, "There's too much unintended mystery about A Woman's Secret for it to be anything but spotty entertainment ... O’Hara gives a straightforward account of herself. Grahame carries handicap of bad makeup and unbecoming hairdress, and Douglas is too coy as the piano-playing friend. Flippen is topnotch as the detective, lifting his scenes, as does Mary Phillips as his amateur private-eye wife."

In 2008 film critic Dennis Schwartz, panned the film, writing, "Nicholas Ray (Rebel Without a Cause / In a Lonely Place / Born to Be Bad) takes a routine 'woman's pic' and turns it into a somewhat oddly diverting noir film by using a few of his perverse touches to liven up the dry story. Though made before Ray's 'official' debut feature They Live by Night, A Woman's Secret was released afterward (new RKO studio boss Howard Hughes held up the release date for no apparent reason, but when released the film lost money as it failed to capitalize on Gloria Grahame's current career momentum which quickly faded) ... In the end, things get untangled. But it's resolved in such a half-hearted and unconvincing way, that the tidied up gem of a mess still gives off an awful stink."
