= Love and Death in Bali =

1937 book by Vicki Baum

- 1957 edition
- Author: Vicki Baum
- Language: German
- Genre: Historical fiction
- Publication date: 1937
- Media type: Print

Love and Death in Bali (German: Liebe und Tod auf Bali) is a 1937 novel by the Austrian writer Vicki Baum. It is set during the 1906 Dutch intervention in Bali. Baum had recently stayed in Bali with her friend Walter Spies who supplied her with background for the novel. It is also known by the title A Tale from Bali.

== Bibliography ==
- Rubinstein, Raechelle & Conner, Linda H. Staying Local in the Global Village: Bali in the Twentieth Century. University of Hawaii Press, 1999.
