= 12,000 =

1927 play by German playwright Bruno Frank

12,000, sometimes given as Twelve Thousand, is a 1927 play by German playwright Bruno Frank, published originally under its German title, Zwölftausend. It is a suspenseful tale of the time of Frederick the Great. The premise revolves around the efforts of the British government in the 18th century to secure mercenaries from Germany to augment British troops in the war to put down the American Revolution. The play is one of Frank's lesser known works, but it has had some success in the theatre and also as a BBC television play in 1950.

== Plot ==
Wilhelm Pederit is private secretary to a German prince. Pederit has raised himself in status from the peasantry, wherein his two brothers still labor. His brothers have contempt for him for his "cushy" job and for his inattention to their farm and their poverty. Pederit takes dictation for an agreement between the prince and Faucitt, an emissary from the king of England, whereby the prince will sell twelve thousand of his male citizens to the British, who will use them as mercenaries in the fight the rebels attempting independence in America. Pederit learns that his two brothers are among those being conscripted, and while he feigns indifference, he actually hopes to find means to save them from their fate. Nothing seems possible until the Baroness of Spangenberg, the prince's mistress, approaches Pederit, requesting his help in getting the seemingly spoiled noblewoman an appointment with a hair stylist of high standing. As the prince has forbidden all but official communications with parts of Germany outside his principality, Pederit uses the Baroness's official seal, not to request the hairdresser, but to alert the king, Frederick the Great, to the prince's plan for providing mercenaries, knowing that Frederick, a more humane ruler, will stop his underling's plan. When an emissary of Frederick's shows up just in time to forestall the departure of the twelve thousand conscripts, the prince realizes that Pederit has tricked him. He condemns his secretary to death. But Frederick's emissary reveals that Frederick has put the whistle-blower under his protection. The fuming prince frees Pederit, and the three brothers, inspired by the emissary's reading out of the American Declaration of Independence, set out to sail to America, not as conscripted soldiers, but as free men looking for a free home.

== Production history ==
Twelve Thousand was produced (as 12,000) on Broadway in March 1928, at the Garrick Theatre using an English-language adaptation by William A. Drake. It was staged by Basil Sydney who also starred as Pederit. Other cast members included Charles Croker-King as the Prince, Mary Ellis as The Baroness of Spangenburg, Lumsden Hare as the Colonel, Walter Kingsford as Faucitt, John McGovern as the Younger Brother, Leonard Mudie as the Elder Brother, and Robert Vivian as Treysa.

The play was produced at the Pasadena Community Playhouse's Playbox theatre in April 1938, with George Reeves as Pederit.

The British Broadcasting Corporation produced a television version of the play in June 1950, with Hugh Burden playing Pederit.
