= Week-End at the Waldorf =

1945 American comedy drama film starring Ginger Rogers

- Theatrical release poster
- Directed by: Robert Z. Leonard
- Screenplay by: Samuel Spewack; Bella Spewack; Guy Bolton (adaptation)
- Based on: Grand Hotel by Vicki Baum
- Produced by: Arthur Hornblow Jr.
- Starring: Ginger Rogers; Lana Turner; Walter Pidgeon; Van Johnson
- Cinematography: Robert H. Planck
- Edited by: Robert J. Kern
- Music by: Johnny Green
- Production company: Metro-Goldwyn-Mayer
- Distributed by: Loew's Inc.
- Release date: October 4, 1945 (Radio City Music Hall)
- Running time: 130 minutes
- Country: United States
- Language: English
- Budget: $2.6 million
- Box office: $6.2 million

Week-End at the Waldorf is a 1945 American comedy drama film directed by Robert Z. Leonard and starring Ginger Rogers, Lana Turner, Walter Pidgeon, and Van Johnson. The film follows the misadventures of several guests and employees of the Waldorf Astoria Hotel in New York City, including a Hollywood actress (Rogers), a stenographer (Turner), an Air Force captain (Johnson) and a war correspondent (Pidgeon). Its screenplay is based on Vicki Baum's novel Grand Hotel and Baum's subsequent stage adaptation of her novel; both of which also served as the source material for the 1932 film Grand Hotel. Guy Bolton is credited with adapting Baum's play for the film with Samuel and Bella Spewack as screenwriters.

== Plot ==
Several guests convene on the lobby of the Waldorf Astoria Hotel in New York City. Among them are Irene Malvern, a disillusioned Hollywood actress in town to attend a wedding and film premiere; Chip Collyer, a war correspondent; Air Force captain James Hollis, recently injured and facing an upcoming surgery; and Martin Edley, a shyster oil stock promoter attempting to defraud the visiting Bey of Aribajan.

To impress the bey, Edley schemes to present himself as an associate of Mr. Jessup, president of Volcanic Oil. Bunny Smith, a hotel stenographer, is charmed by Edley and intends to court him for his apparent wealth, though she soon develops an attraction to James. Meanwhile, Irene learns that a man has been romancing her maid, Anna, in an attempt to steal Irene's jewels.

James loses sheet music for a song he has written, which a hotel staff member discovers and brings to orchestra leader Xavier Cugat, who plans to perform it at the hotel's next concert. That night, Oliver Webson, a reporter covering Edley's purported deal, informs Chip that Edley is negotiating with the bey. Chip agrees to help Oliver cover his story, and inadvertently enters Irene's room while doing so. Irene accuses Chip—a fan of Irene and her films—of being another jewel thief. After some conversation, Irene warms to Chip and allows him to stay in her room to avoid being caught by the house detective. Meanwhile, James has begun romancing Bunny, and invites her on a dinner date on Saturday.

On Saturday morning, Irene learns that Chip is in fact not a jewel thief. Later, Cynthia Drew, a bride-to-be, informs Irene that she believes her fiancé, Dr. Bob Campbell, is infatuated with her. A flustered Cynthia plans to call off her wedding to Bob, which Irene desperately tries to prevent by lying that she is already married to Chip. Chip, who has found himself falling in love with Irene, goes along with her hoax. Meanwhile, Bunny cancels her date with James after Edley asks her to accompany the bey to the hotel's Starlight ballroom party that night. At the party, James observes Bunny with the bey and is heartbroken.

On Sunday morning, a newspaper gossip column reports on Irene and Chip's supposed marriage. Irene is initially infuriated by this, but soon realizes that she is in love with Chip. By Monday, local newspapers expose Edley's scam. Bunny, remorseful over having chosen to help Edley over meeting James for their date, tells him she wishes to accompany him to Washington, D.C. for his impending surgery. As Chip checks out of the hotel and prepares to return to Europe, he promises to reunite with Irene upon his return.

== Cast ==
- Ginger Rogers as Irene Malvern
- Walter Pidgeon as Chip Collyer
- Van Johnson as Capt. James Hollis
- Lana Turner as Bunny Smith
- Edward Arnold as Martin X. Edley
- Keenan Wynn as Oliver Webson
- Robert Benchley as Randy Morton
- Leon Ames as Henry Burton
- Samuel S. Hinds as Mr. Jessup
- Phyllis Thaxter as Cynthia Drew
- Warner Anderson as Dr. Bob Campbell
- Rosemary DeCamp as Anna
- Porter Hall as Stevens
- George Zucco as Bey of Aribajan
- Miles Mander as British Secretary
- Xavier Cugat as himself

== Production ==
=== Development ===
Waldorf-Astoria management wanted the film shot in color in order to show the hotel at its best advantage, a demand that almost led Metro-Goldwyn-Mayer (MGM) executives to switch the locale to San Francisco and change the title to Palace in the Sky.

=== Casting ===
Lana Turner's casting was announced in July 1944.

=== Filming ===
The production budget for Week-End at the Waldorf was $2,561,000. Mrs. Lucius Boomer, wife of the president of the Waldorf-Astoria Corporation, served as a technical advisor on the film, as did Ted Saucier, who handled public relations for the property. Some interiors and exteriors of the hotel were filmed on location, but the lobby, Starlight Roof, guest rooms, and other public spaces were recreated on the backlot of the MGM Studios in Culver City, California. Construction of the elaborate sets began in the fall of 1944.

Writer Richard Alleman, in his book New York: The Movie Lover's Guide: The Ultimate Insider Tour of Movie New York (2013), praised the film's art design as a "triumph," writing that it is "practically impossible to tell which scenes have been shot by the second-unit crew on location and which were done at the MGM studios."

The film pays homage to its source by including a scene in which Chip Collyer recreates a scene from the 1930 play based on the Vicki Baum novel, and Irene Malvern identifies it as an excerpt from Grand Hotel.

Turner celebrated her twenty-fourth birthday on the set of the film.

== Music ==
The film's theme song, "And There You Are", was written by Sammy Fain and Ted Koehler.

== Release ==
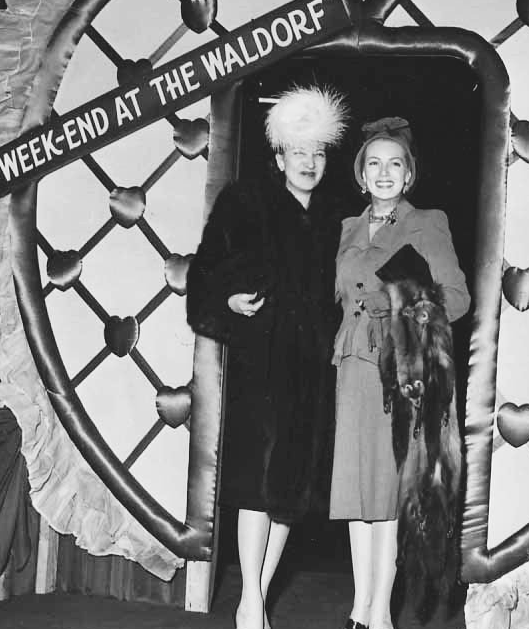
Lana Turner (right) with her mother at a Waldorf Astoria party for the film, 1945

The film premiered in New York City at Radio City Music Hall on October 4, 1945. It opened in Los Angeles on October 16, 1945.

=== Home media ===
MGM/UA Home Video released Week-End at the Waldorf on VHS in 1993. The Warner Archive Collection released the film on DVD on October 21, 2009.

== Reception ==
=== Box office ===
Week-End at the Waldorf sold 275,439 tickets at Radio City Music Hall within its first eleven days of release. According to MGM records, the film earned $4,364,000 in the US and Canada, and $1.8 million elsewhere, resulting in a total gross of $6,164,000 and a profit of $1,474,000. The film was the sixth largest-grossing film of 1945 and also a "huge hit" for actress Lana Turner.

=== Critical response ===
In a contemporary review, Variety noted there is "never a dull moment in this weekend". Kate Cameron of the New York Daily News praised Leonard's direction as "ingenious" and described the screenplay's episodic nature as "cleverly" orchestrated.

Edgar Price of the Brooklyn Citizen felt Leonard's direction was "well-paced" and praised the principal cast members as "ideal in their respective roles." In The New York Times's review, the film was appraised as "fitful entertainment, engaging and pleasantly amusing when at its best and something less otherwise."

== Sources ==
- Alleman, Richard (2013). New York: The Movie Lover's Guide: The Ultimate Insider Tour of Movie New York. New York City, New York: Broadway Books. ISBN 978-0-804-13778-2.
- Eagan, Daniel (2010). America's Film Legacy: The Authoritative Guide to the Landmark Movies in the National Film Registry. Bloomsbury Academic. ISBN 978-0-826-42977-3.
