= Mortgage on Life =

1946 novel

- Author: Vicki Baum
- Language: English
- Genre: Drama
- Publisher: Doubleday
- Publication date: 1946
- Publication place: United States
- Media type: Print

Mortgage on Life (German: Verpfändetes Leben) is a 1946 novel by the Austrian writer Vicki Baum, by then living in the United States of America.

== Film adaptation ==
In 1949 it was adapted into the film A Woman's Secret directed by Nicholas Ray and starring Maureen O'Hara, Melvyn Douglas and Gloria Grahame.

== Bibliography ==
- Goble, Alan. The Complete Index to Literary Sources in Film. Walter de Gruyter, 1999.
- Johnson, Kevin. The Dark Page: Books that Inspired American Film Noir, (1940-1949). Oak Knoll Press, 2007.
