= Menschen im Hotel =

1959 film

- Directed by: Gottfried Reinhardt
- Written by: Ladislas Fodor; Hans Jacoby
- Produced by: Artur Brauner
- Starring: O.W. Fischer; Michèle Morgan; Heinz Rühmann; Gert Fröbe
- Cinematography: Göran Strindberg
- Edited by: Kurt Zeunert
- Music by: Hans-Martin Majewski
- Production companies: CCC-Filmkunst GmbH; Les Films Modernes S.A.
- Distributed by: Gloria Filmverleih
- Release date: 23 September 1959
- Running time: 105 minutes
- Countries: West Germany, France
- Language: German

Menschen im Hotel (French: Grand Hotel) is a 1959 German and French black-and-white drama film directed by Gottfried Reinhardt, and produced by Artur Brauner. It starred O.W. Fischer, Michèle Morgan, Heinz Rühmann and Gert Fröbe. The screenplay was written by Ladislas Fodor and Hans Jacoby, based on the 1929 novel by Vicki Baum. The film is a remake of the 1932 classic Grand Hotel.

== Plot ==
The film shows two days and nights in a Berlin luxury hotel and tells the story of how the paths of various quite different characters cross. It begins with an attempted suicide by the famous dancer Grusinskaja. She is rescued by an impoverished noble, Baron von Gaigern, and falls in love with him. Von Gaigern, who makes a living as a hotel thief, learns about the corrupt dealings by businessman Preysing. He attempts to blackmail Preysing, with tragic results.

== Cast ==
- O.W. Fischer as Baron von Gaigern
- Michèle Morgan as Grusinskaja
- Heinz Rühmann as Kringelein
- Sonja Ziemann as Flämmchen
- Gert Fröbe as Preysing
- Dorothea Wieck as Suzanne
- Wolfgang Wahl as Max, the chauffeur
- Friedrich Schoenfelder as Receptionist
- Jean-Jacques Delbo as 1st doorman
- Reinhold Pasch as 2nd doorman
- Siegfried Schürenberg as Dr. Behrend

== Production ==
Menschen im Hotel was a German-French co-production, directed by Gottfried Reinhardt and produced by Artur Brauner. The screenplay was written by Ladislas Fodor and Hans Jacoby, based on the 1929 novel by Vicki Baum. The film is a remake of the 1932 classic Grand Hotel, starring Greta Garbo and John Barrymore.

Filming took place from 15 February to 31 March 1959 at the Spandau Studios in Berlin.

== Censorship ==
When Menschen im Hotel was first released in Italy in 1959 the Committee for the Theatrical Review of the Italian Ministry of Cultural Heritage and Activities rated the film VM18: not suitable for children under 18. In order for the film to be screened publicly, the Committee recommended the removal of the entire scene in which Fiammetta undresses in the bathroom until the moment when she shows up wearing a bathrobe. The official document number is: N° 27922, it was signed on 10 October 1958 by Minister Domenico Magrì.

== Release ==
Menschen im Hotel at the time received a FSK rating of "18 and older". The film premiered on 23 September 1959 at Gloria Palast in Munich. The premiere of the French (dubbed) version was in Paris, on 25 March 1960.
