= Grand Hotel (1932 film) =

Adaptation of William Drake play

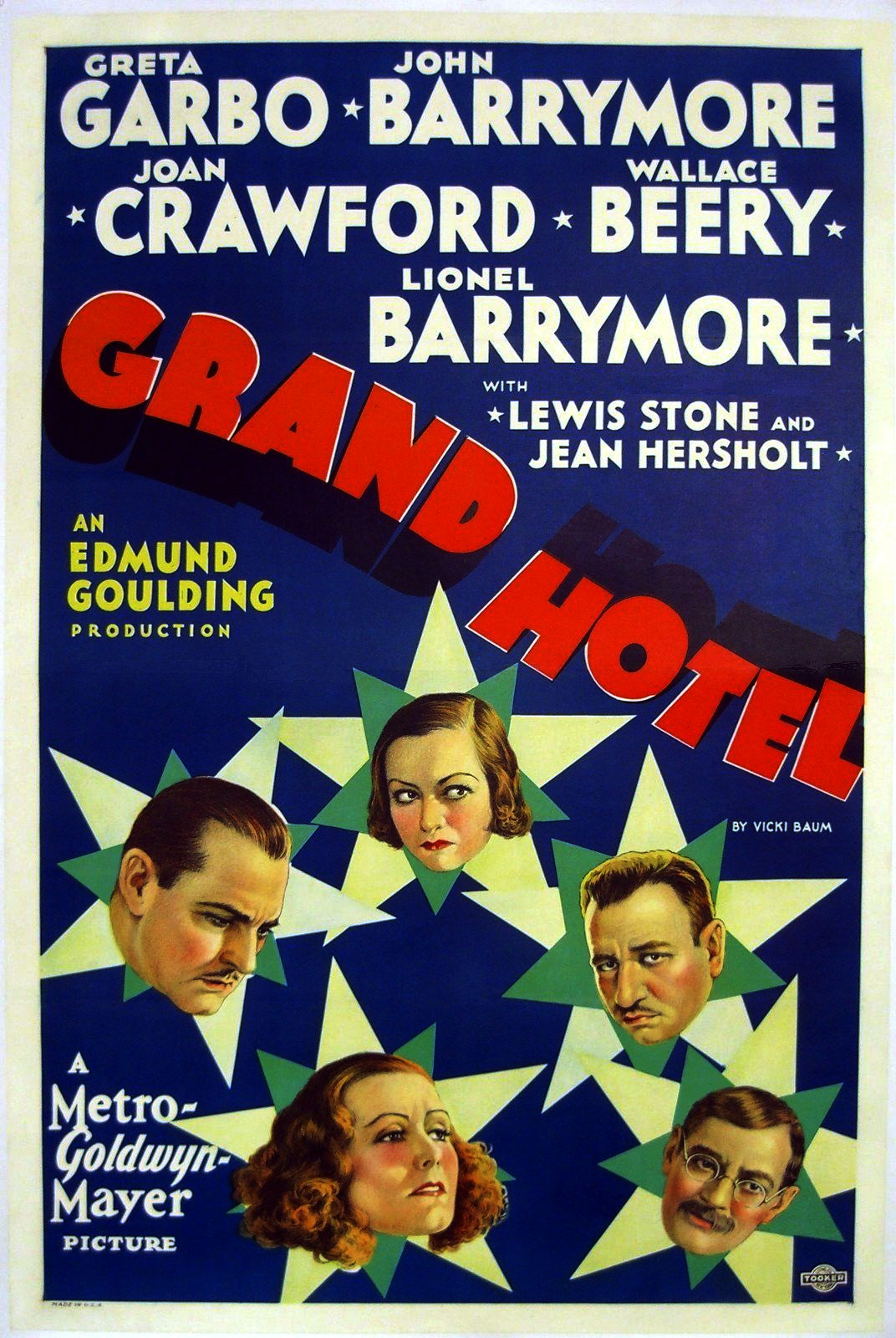
- Original poster
- Directed by: Edmund Goulding
- Written by: William A. Drake
- Based on: Grand Hotel 1930 play by William A. Drake; Grand Hotel 1929 novel by Vicki Baum
- Produced by: Irving Thalberg
- Starring: Greta Garbo; John Barrymore; Joan Crawford; Wallace Beery; Lionel Barrymore; Lewis Stone; Jean Hersholt
- Cinematography: William H. Daniels
- Edited by: Blanche Sewell
- Music by: William Axt; Charles Maxwell
- Production company: Metro-Goldwyn-Mayer
- Distributed by: Loew's, Inc.
- Release dates: April 12, 1932 (New York City, premiere)
- Running time: 112 minutes
- Country: United States
- Language: English
- Budget: $750,000
- Box office: $2,594,000

Grand Hotel is a 1932 American drama film directed by Edmund Goulding and produced by Metro-Goldwyn-Mayer. The screenplay by William A. Drake is based on the 1930 play by Drake, who had adapted it from the 1929 novel Menschen im Hotel by Vicki Baum.

MGM remade the pre-Code film as Week-End at the Waldorf in 1945. The German remake Menschen im Hotel was released in 1959, and it served as the basis for the 1989 Tony Award-winning stage musical Grand Hotel. In 1977, MGM announced a musical remake, to take place at Las Vegas' MGM Grand Hotel and directed by Norman Jewison, but the production was cancelled.

Grand Hotel has proven influential in the years since its release. The iconic line "I want to be alone", famously delivered by Greta Garbo, placed number 30 in AFI's 100 Years...100 Movie Quotes. To date, it is the only film to have won the Academy Award for Best Picture without being nominated in any other category. In 2007, the film was selected for preservation in the United States National Film Registry by the Library of Congress for being "culturally, historically, or aesthetically significant". As a published work from 1932, the film will enter the American public domain on January 1, 2028.

== Plot ==
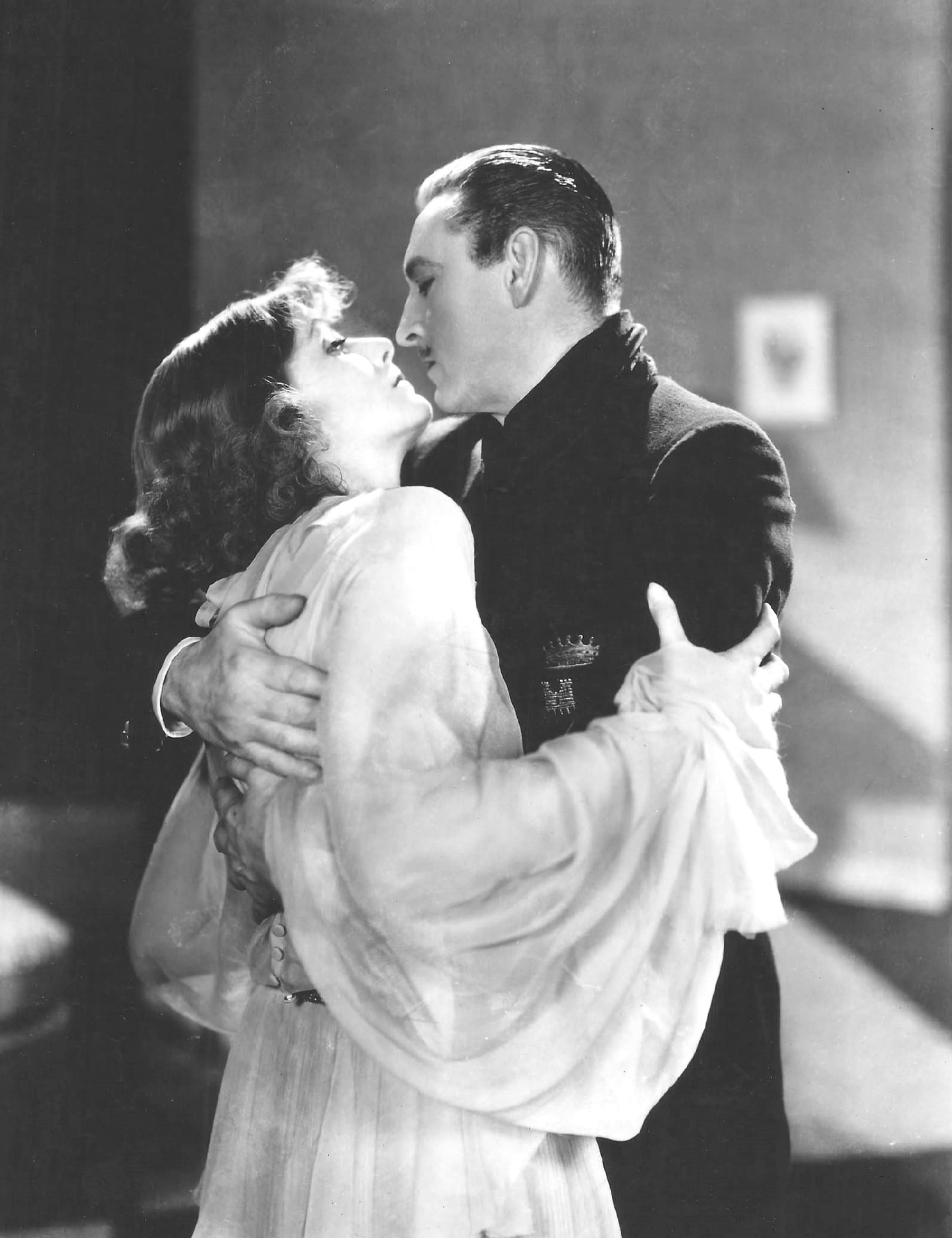
Greta Garbo and John Barrymore in Grand Hotel

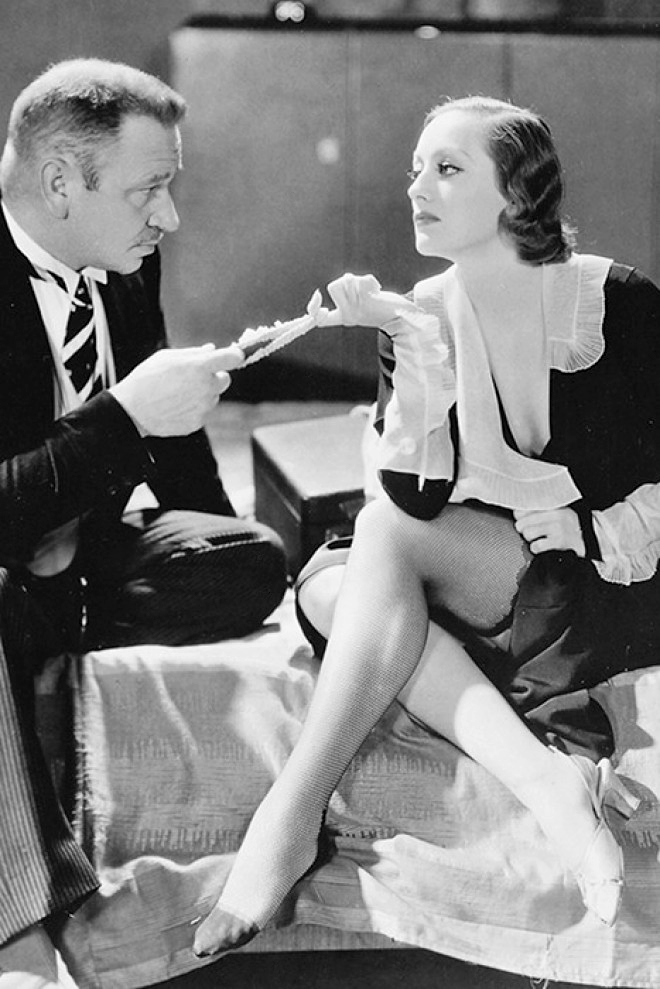
Wallace Beery and Joan Crawford

Doctor Otternschlag, a disfigured veteran of World War I and a permanent resident of the Grand Hotel in Berlin, observes "People coming, going. Nothing ever happens" — after which a great deal transpires.

Baron Felix von Gaigern, who squandered his fortune and supports himself as a card player and occasional jewel thief, befriends Otto Kringelein, a dying accountant who has decided to spend his remaining days in the lap of luxury. Kringelein's former employer, industrialist General Director Preysing, is at the hotel to close an important deal, and he hires stenographer Flaemmchen to assist him. She aspires to be an actress and shows Preysing some magazine photos for which she posed.

Another guest is Russian ballerina Grusinskaya, whose career is on the wane. When the baron is in her room to steal her jewelry and she returns from the theatre, he hides in her room and overhears her contemplating suicide. He comes out of hiding and engages her in conversation. The two fall in love and spend the night together. The following morning, the baron returns Grusinskaya's jewels, and she forgives his crime. She invites him to accompany her to Vienna, an offer he accepts.

The baron is desperate for money to pay his way out of the criminal group he has been working with. He and Kringelein start a card game, and Kringelein wins everything, then becomes intoxicated. When he drops his wallet, the baron stashes it in his pocket, intending to keep not only the winnings but the funds that are intended to see Kringelein through the last weeks of his life. However, moved by the sight of Kringelein's despair, the baron – who desperately needs the money, but has become very fond of Kringelein – pretends to have discovered the wallet and returns it to him.

As part of a desperate merger plan, Preysing must travel to England, and he asks Flaemmchen to accompany him. Later, when the two are in her room—which opens onto his—Preysing sees the shadow of the baron rifling through his belongings. He confronts the baron, who hands his wallet back to him. The two struggle, and Preysing bludgeons the baron with the telephone, killing him. Flaemmchen sees what happened and runs to tell Kringelein, who confronts Preysing. He insists he acted in self-defense and asks Kringelein to lie, but Kringelein summons the police, and Preysing is arrested.

Grusinskaya departs for the train station, expecting to find the baron waiting for her there. Meanwhile, Kringelein offers to take care of Flaemmchen, who suggests they visit Paris together. As they leave the hotel, Doctor Otternschlag again observes "Grand Hotel. Always the same. People come. People go. Nothing ever happens."

== Cast ==
Grand Hotel Trailer

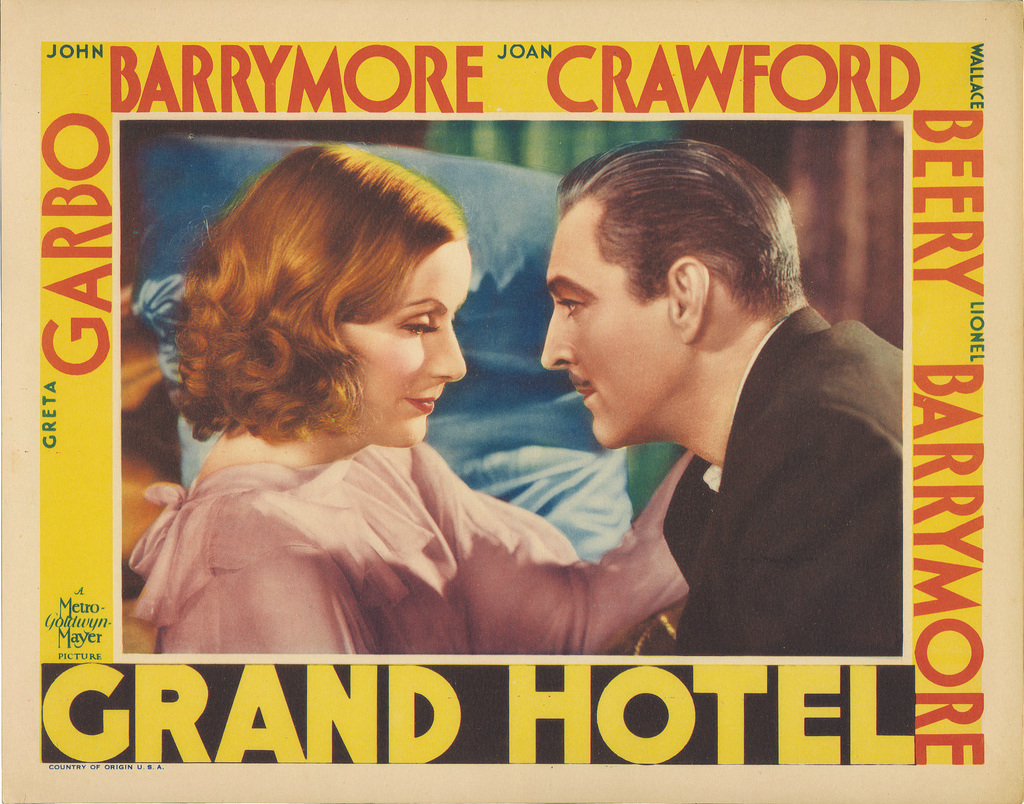
Lobby card

- Greta Garbo as Grusinskaya, the dancer
- John Barrymore as Baron Felix von Gaigern
- Joan Crawford as Flaemmchen, the stenographer
- Wallace Beery as General Director Preysing
- Lionel Barrymore as Otto Kringelein
- Lewis Stone as Dr. Otternschlag
- Jean Hersholt as Senf, the porter

The cast also includes

- Robert McWade as Meierheim
- Purnell B. Pratt as Zinnowitz
- Ferdinand Gottschalk as Pimenov
- Rafaela Ottiano as Suzette
- Morgan Wallace as chauffeur
- Tully Marshall as Gerstenkorn
- Frank Conroy as Rohna
- Murray Kinnell as Schweimann
- Edwin Maxwell as Dr. Waitz
- Allen Jenkins as hotel meat packer

== Production ==
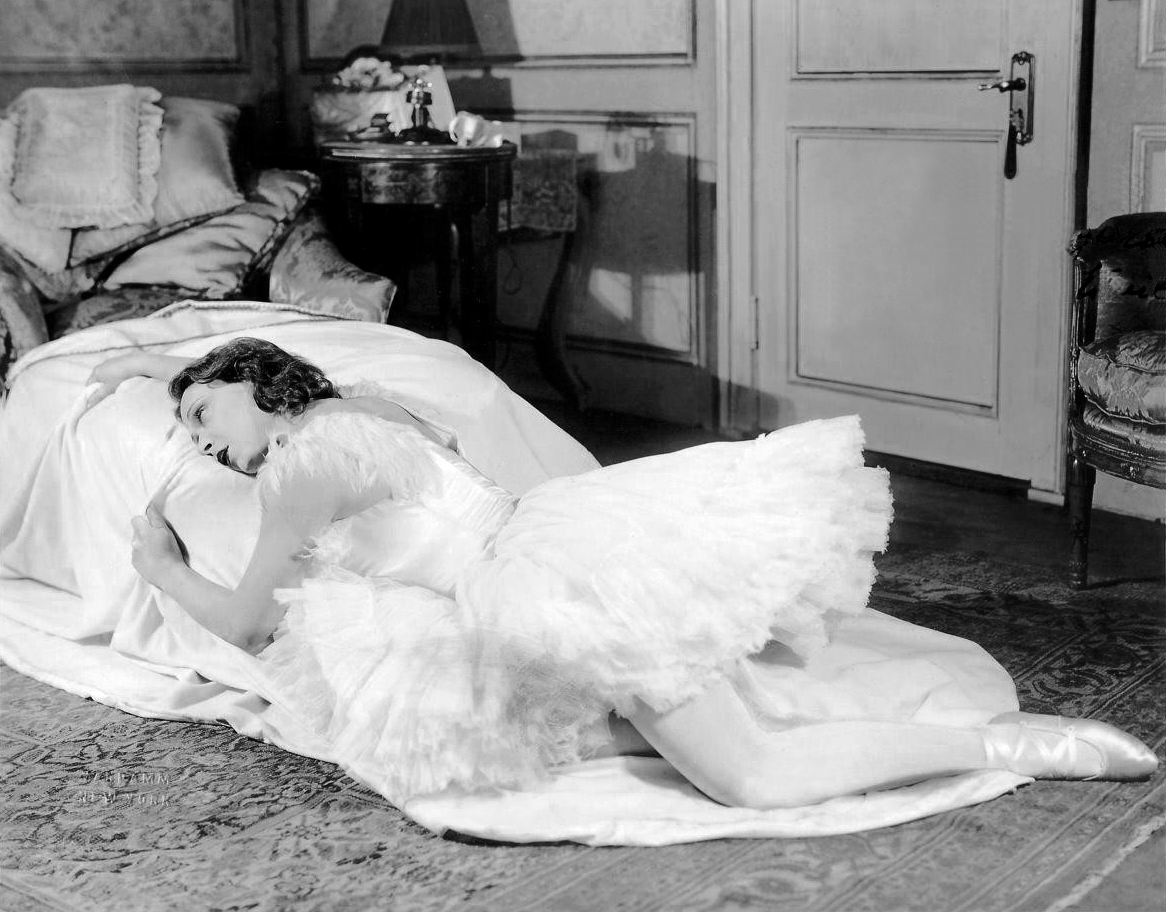
Eugenie Leontovich as Grusinskaya in the original Broadway production of Grand Hotel (1930)

Producer Irving Thalberg purchased the rights to Vicki Baum's novel Menschen im Hotel for $13,000 and then commissioned William A. Drake to adapt it for the stage. It opened on Broadway at the National Theatre on November 13, 1930, and ran for 459 performances. Pleased with its success, Thalberg had Drake and Béla Balázs write the screenplay, and had a budget at $700,000. There was some controversy about Greta Garbo, with her strong Swedish accent, playing a Russian.

The film was seen as an artistic achievement in its art direction and production design. The lobby scenes were extremely well done, portraying a 360° front desk. This set allowed audiences to watch the hotel action from all around the characters. It changed the way sets were made from that point onward.

It was the first film to feature brothers Lionel and John Barrymore together. Thalberg initially cast Marie Dessler for the role of Suzette, but replaced her with Rafaela Ottiano, the only cast member from the Broadway production.

=== "I want to be alone" ===
As Grusinskaya, Greta Garbo delivers the line "I want to be alone", and, immediately following, she says "I just want to be alone." Soon after, in conversation with Baron Felix von Geigern, she says "And I want to be alone." Referring to its legendary use as a characterization of her reclusive personal life, Garbo later insisted "I never said I want to be alone; I only said, 'I want to be let alone.' There is all the difference."

== Reception ==
=== Box office ===
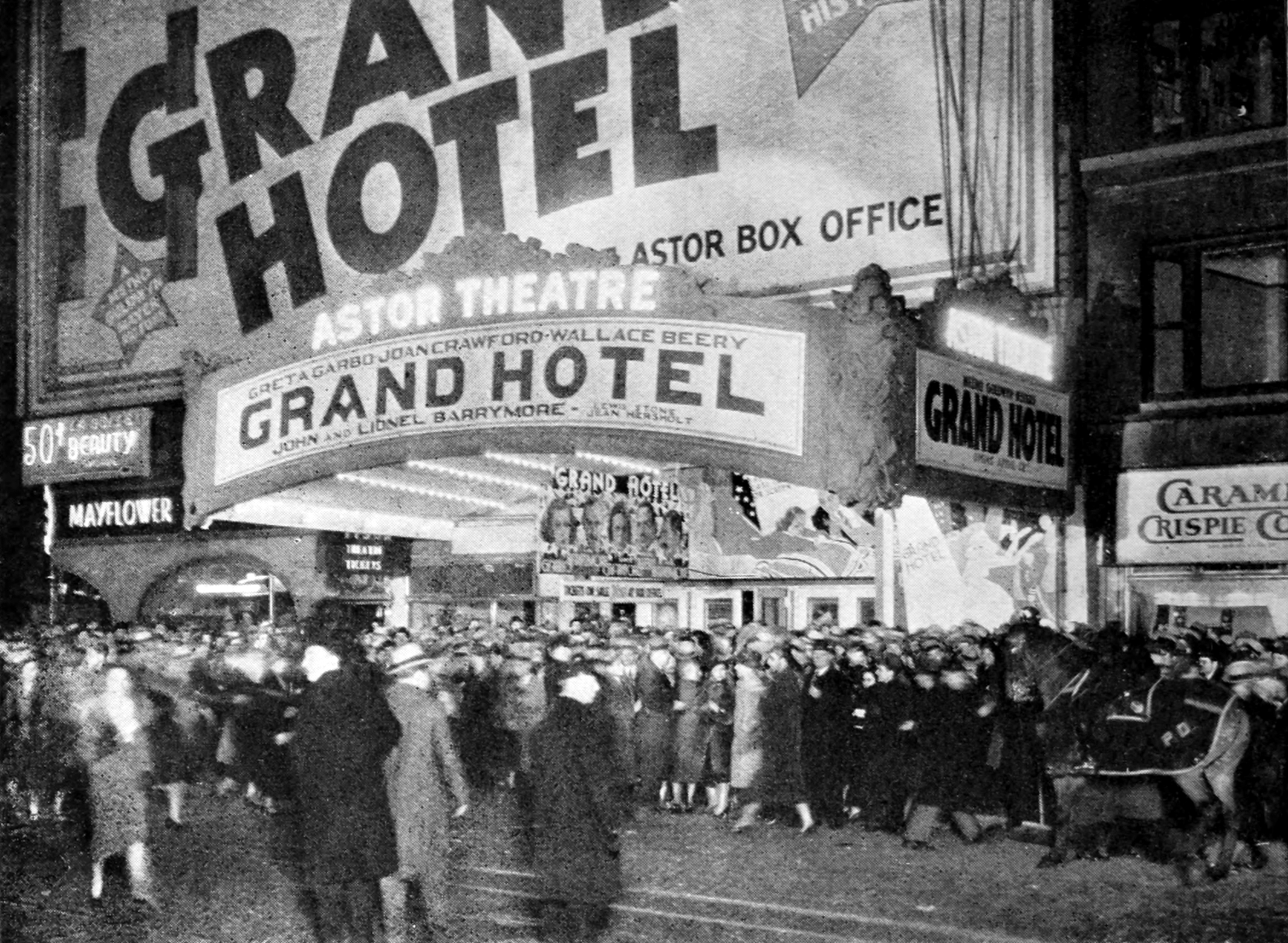
New York City opening of Grand Hotel at the Astor Theatre (April 12, 1932)

Grand Hotel was a massive commercial success upon its release. It opened April 12, 1932 at the Astor Theatre in New York City where it played for almost 5 months. It played at Grauman's Chinese Theatre in Los Angeles for 11 weeks. The film had a roadshow theatrical release in 700 cities. According to MGM records, the film earned $1,235,000 in the U.S. and Canada and $1,359,000 in other markets, resulting in an estimated profit of $947,000.

=== Critical reception ===
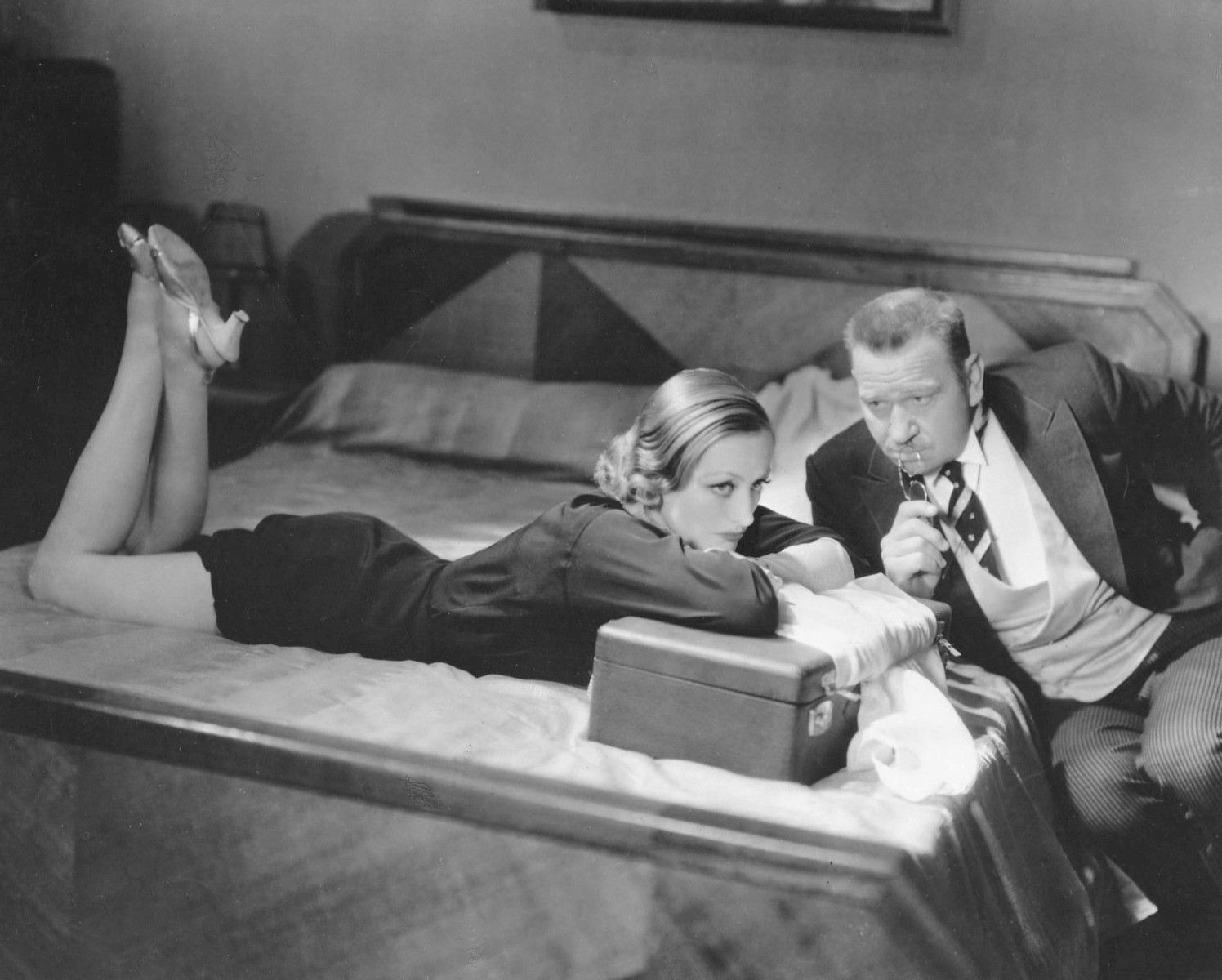
Joan Crawford and Wallace Beery

Alfred Rushford Greason of Variety comparing the film to the stage production, wrote "[it] may not entirely please the theatregoers who were fascinated by its deft stage direction and restrained acting, but it will attract and hold the wider public to which it is now addressed". He added, "The drama unfolds with a speed that never loses its grip, even for the extreme length of nearly two hours, and there is a captivating pattern of unexpected comedy that runs through it all, always fresh and always pat."

Mordaunt Hall of The New York Times praised the performances of Greta Garbo and John Barrymore, in a mostly positive review. "The picture adheres faithfully to the original", he said, "and while it undoubtedly lacks the life and depth and color of the play, by means of excellent characterizations it keeps the audience on the qui vive."

Film Daily called it an "engrossing drama" that "never lags", and "one of the classiest moving picture affairs you've seen in a long time".

John Mosher of The New Yorker called it a "tricky, clever film", praising Goulding as "a director at last to give Garbo her due" and for his "ingenious" camera work, "relishing, I suspect, the advantages the screen offers in these respects over the stage, where the awkward constant shifting of scenes clogged the action of the play".

Pauline Kael wrote: "From her first line, "I have never been so tired in my life," Greta Garbo sets the movie in vibration with her extraordinary sensual presence. ... There is every reason to reject Grand Hotel as an elaborate chunk of artifice ... But if you want to see what screen glamour used to be, and what, originally, "stars" were, this is perhaps the best example of all time. Grand Hotel is still entertaining because of ... the force of the personalities involved in the omnibus story." Leonard Maltin in his Movie Guide gave it four of four stars: "Vicki Baum's novel and play of plush Berlin hotel where "nothing ever happens." Stars prove the contrary ..." Leslie Halliwell wrote: "It's a little faded now, but much of the magic still works in this first of the portmanteau movies; the production is opulent yet somehow stiff, and the performances have survived with varying success."

=== Legacy ===
The film holds an 85% approval rating on Rotten Tomatoes, based on 55 reviews. The site's consensus reads: "Perhaps less a true film than a series of star-studded vignettes, Grand Hotel still remains an entertaining look back at a bygone Hollywood era."

Writing in 2009, Blake Goble of The Michigan Daily called it "the original Ocean's Eleven for its star power", and compared it to Gosford Park "for its dense structure and stories". He added "[T]he pacing is quick, the acting is eloquent, and the stories are actually interesting. It's pure theatricality. But Hotel lasted thanks to its simplicity, and the star power doesn't hurt either. This is grand, old Hollywood captured on film."

In 2022, Leila Jordan of Paste magazine noted the film as highly influential: "Recognizable names, intersecting stories and a cast that makes you go “wait they’re in this too?” Grand Hotel didn’t invent the genre, but it was the first to assemble the pieces into a sensational hit."

== Aborted 1970s musical remake ==
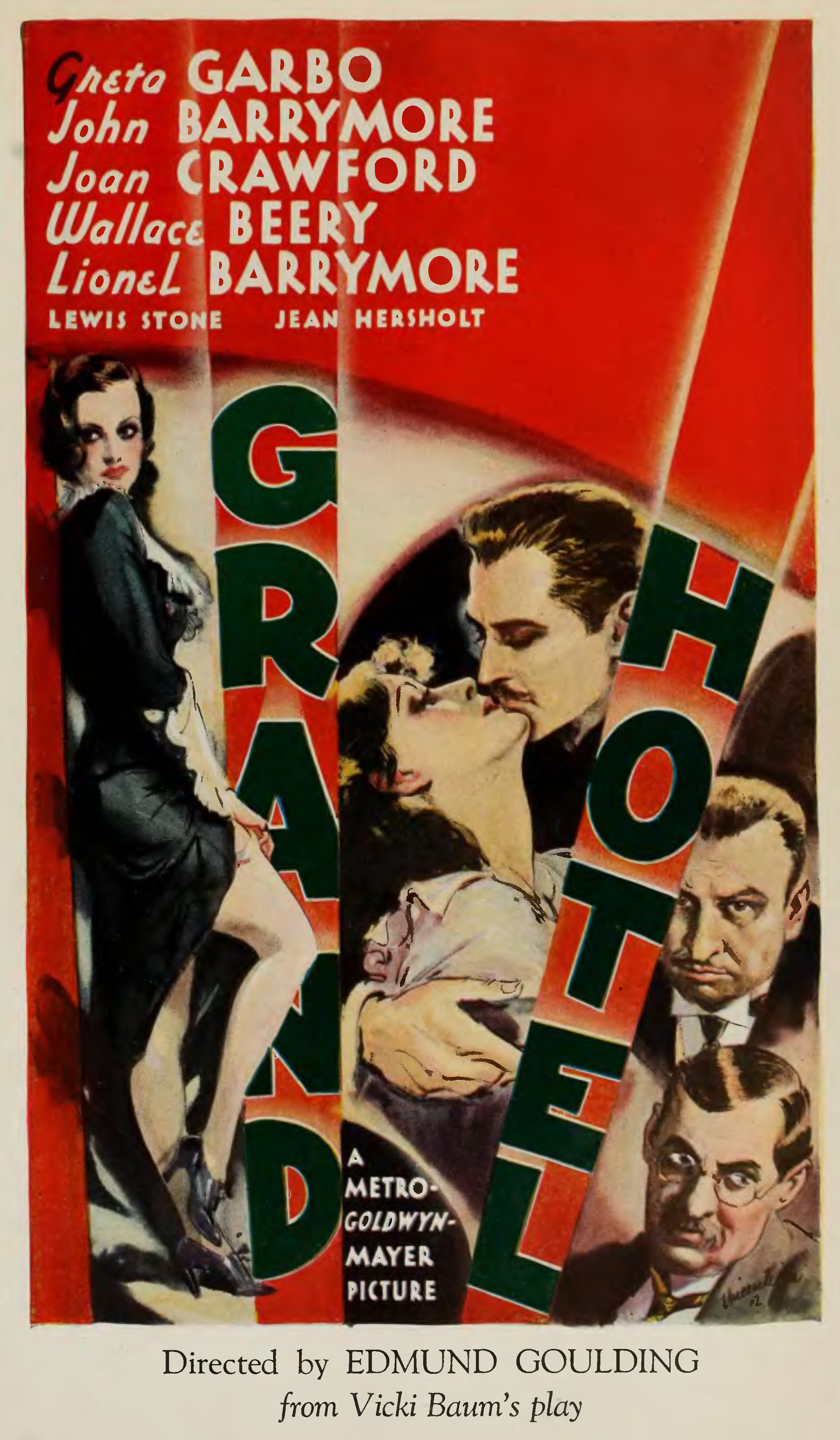
Movie ad from The Film Daily, 1932

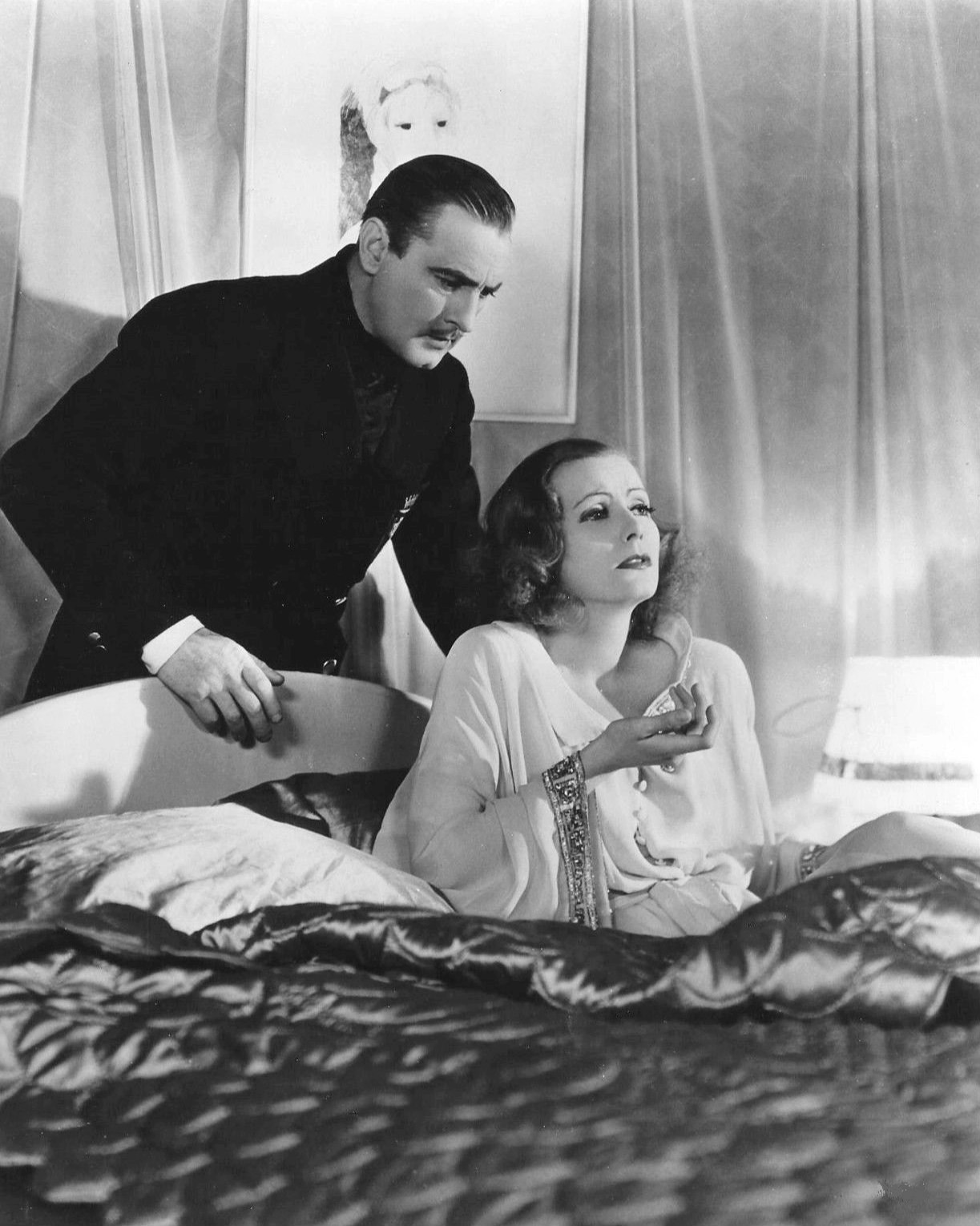
John Barrymore and Greta Garbo

In his memoir Adventures in the Screen Trade, screenwriter William Goldman recalls being contacted by director Norman Jewison about doing a remake of the film as a musical, to be set at the original MGM Grand Hotel in Las Vegas (now The Horseshoe). It would also be filmed at the hotel, named for the film and opened just four years earlier, where MGM had not yet allowed any filming of its luxurious interiors. Goldman was very enthusiastic, since even though movie musicals were not very popular with studios or audiences at the time, he believed Grand Hotel could be an exception, recalling the classic Hollywood movie musicals of the 1940s and 1950s, with the real interiors of the Grand, never before seen on screen, as their setting. Goldman also worried that he was being seen too much as a screenwriter of thrillers and wanted to show that he was not a genre writer.

MGM executives, initially cooperative, began to have second thoughts about the project once one of them remembered that Jewison had final cut in his contract, meaning the studio could not force him to make changes to the film before release. Goldman characterized their perception of the hotel as "Pristine. Unsullied. The diamond in the Metro crown", and believed they feared the film would not depict the Grand this way, instead focusing on the less glamorous aspects of Las Vegas. Goldman wrote a draft of the script with far more detail than he normally added to make clear that this was not his or Jewison's intention, but the studio was not sufficiently persuaded. As a compromise, they offered Jewison final cut on any material filmed outside the hotel, but not inside. Jewison was unwilling to accept that, and the project fell through.

Four years later, Jewison called Goldman again and said the hotel, now under separate management from the studio, was again interested. Staff at the hotel took Goldman on tours of the building as part of his research. While visiting the suites on the uppermost floors, never rented but instead comped to heavy gamblers and their entourages, he was told that director Hal Ashby had used one for a scene in the then-unreleased Lookin' to Get Out, apparently after Caesars Palace had refused him permission to use one of their suites. Goldman and Jewison learned that in the scene Ashby filmed at the Grand, one of the main characters goes into the suite with a prostitute while his friend waits outside. This was at odds with the image of the Grand management had gone to great lengths to avoid projecting in 1977.

After the 1981 MGM film ...All the Marbles, set in the world of women's professional wrestling, staged its climax at the MGM Grand in Reno, Nevada, Goldman felt the Grand had lost its mystique and so lost his enthusiasm for working on the film; the project was dropped.

== Home media ==
Warner Home Video released the first Region 1 DVD on February 3, 2004. The film is in 4:3 frame format, with audio tracks in English and French, and subtitles in English, French, and Spanish. Bonus features include Checking Out: Grand Hotel, a documentary about the making of the film; a 1932 newsreel with highlights of the Hollywood premiere; Nothing Ever Happens, a 1933 Vitaphone short film spoofing Grand Hotel; and theatrical trailers.

The 2013 Warner Home Video Blu-ray release of Grand Hotel contains an audio commentary track by film historians Jeffrey Vance and Mark A. Vieira.
