= Treachery on the High Seas =

1936 film directed by Emil E. Reinert

- Directed by: Emil E. Reinert
- Written by: Charles Lincoln; Harold Simpson
- Based on: Murder in the Stalls by Maurice Messenger
- Produced by: Alexander Dembo de Lasta
- Starring: Bebe Daniels; Ben Lyon; Charles Farrell
- Cinematography: Roy Fogwell; Walter J. Harvey
- Edited by: Sidney Stone
- Production company: Alexandre de Lasta Productions
- Distributed by: British Lion Film Corporation
- Release date: December 1936
- Running time: 72 minutes
- Country: United Kingdom
- Language: English

Treachery on the High Seas, also known as Not Wanted on Voyage, is a 1936 British comedy crime film directed by Emil E. Reinert and starring Bebe Daniels, Ben Lyon and Charles Farrell. It is based on the play Murder in the Stalls by Maurice Messenger.

It was produced at British Lion's Beaconsfield Studios. The film's sets were designed by the art director Norman G. Arnold.

== Synopsis ==
On a luxury liner some jewel thieves plan a major snatch.

== Cast ==
- Bebe Daniels as May Hardy
- Ben Lyon as Johnny Hammond
- Charles Farrell as Logan
- Tom Helmore as Edward Brailstone
- Hay Petrie as Brainie
- Gordon McLeod as Fleming
- James Carew as Chief
