= Grand Hotel (novel) =

1929 novel

Grand Hotel (original German Menschen im Hotel, "People in the Hotel") is a 1929 novel by Vicki Baum, which was the basis for the 1932 film Grand Hotel. It should not be confused with Berlin Hotel (original German Hotel Berlin), published in 1945, which deals with the situation in Germany towards the end of World War II. The film Grand Hotel was remade as Week-End at the Waldorf (1945).

The novel first appeared in serialised form in the illustrated newspaper Berliner Illustrirte Zeitung — published by the Ullstein-Verlag for which Baum worked — from 31 March to 23 June 1929 (in 13 weekly instalments). The newspaper had a readership at the time of around two million.

Baum first adapted the novel herself later in 1929 for an eponymous play, and it was adapted again in 1930 in the United States by William A. Drake and in 1931 in Britain by Edward Knoblock as Grand Hotel. Much later, it became a successful 1989 musical which is still regularly revived around the world.

A very successful English translation, by Basil Creighton, was published in 1930 by Geoffrey Bles, London.

In later times, "Grand Hotel" came to be the unofficial name for a subgenre of novels. Thus, The New York Times review of Paul Gallico's 1969 book The Poseidon Adventure, about a group of passengers attempting to escape from a capsized ocean liner, noted that "Mr. Gallico collects a Grand Hotel of shipboard dossiers. These interlocking histories may be damp with sentimentality as well as brine—but the author's skill as a storyteller invests them with enough suspense to last the desperate journey."

Greta Garbo's famous phrase 'I want to be alone' comes from the 1932 film adaptation in which she plays a ballet dancer.
