= Emil-Edwin Reinert =

French filmmaker (1903–1953)

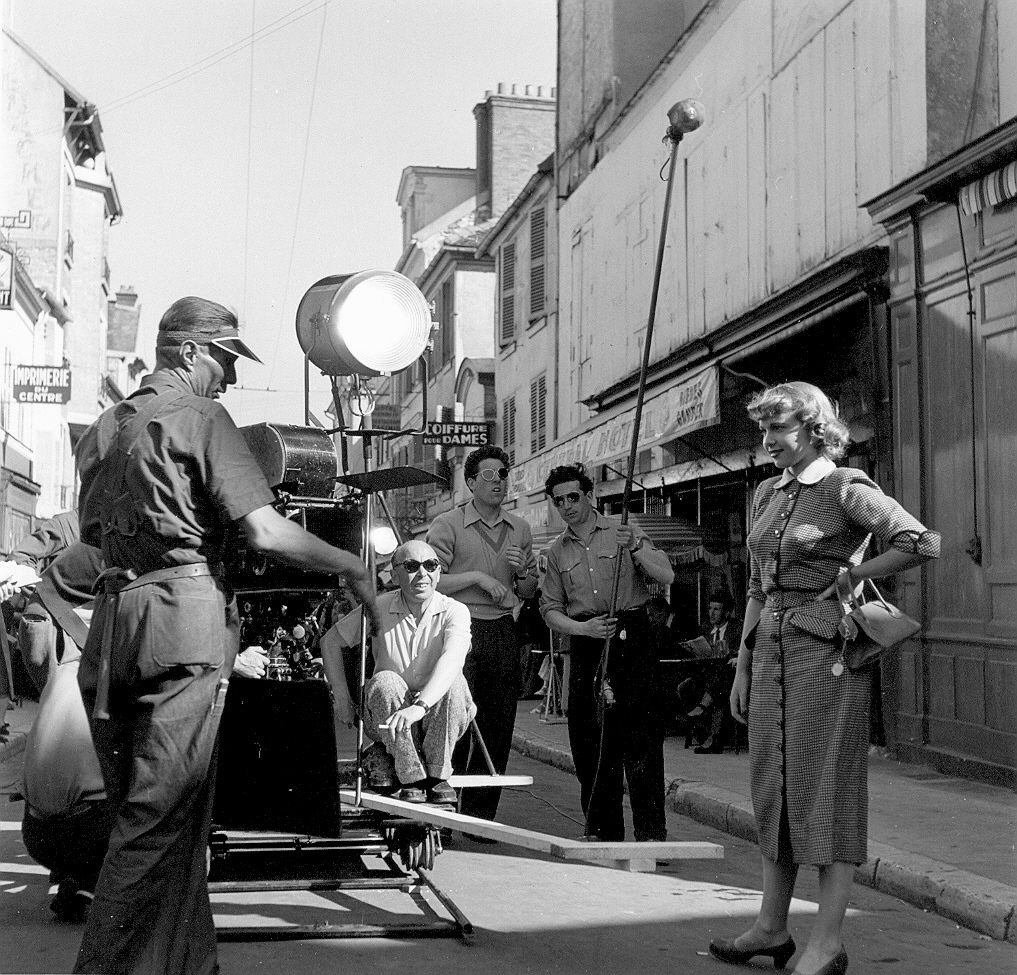
- Emil-Edwin Reinert during production of Le destin s'amuse, 1947
- Born: Emil, Edwin Reinert; 16 March 1903; Rava-Ruska, Austria-Hungary
- Died: 17 October 1953 (aged 50); Paris, France
- Occupations: Film director, screenwriter, producer
- Years active: 1932–1952
- Spouse: Irène-Elisabeth Kaeser (1945–53)
- Children: Jean-Michel Reinert

Emil-Edwin Reinert, or Emile-Edwin Reinert, (16 March 1903 – 17 October 1953) was a French film director, screenwriter, audio engineer and producer.

Born in Rava-Ruska, Austria-Hungary in 1903, Reinert directed films in France, Great Britain, Switzerland and Austria as well he directed in co productions, associating different countries : Austria, France, Italy, West Germany, Great Britain and the United States. He died in Paris in 1953.

== Filmography ==
=== As director ===
==== Short films ====
- 1932 La machine à sous
- 1932 La Seine
- 1932 Les porcelaines de Limoges
- 1933 La tête de veau
- 1933 On déjeune à midi
- 1934 Une affaire garantie
- 1935 Nous serons toujours heureux
- 1935 Le siège arrière

==== Feature films ====
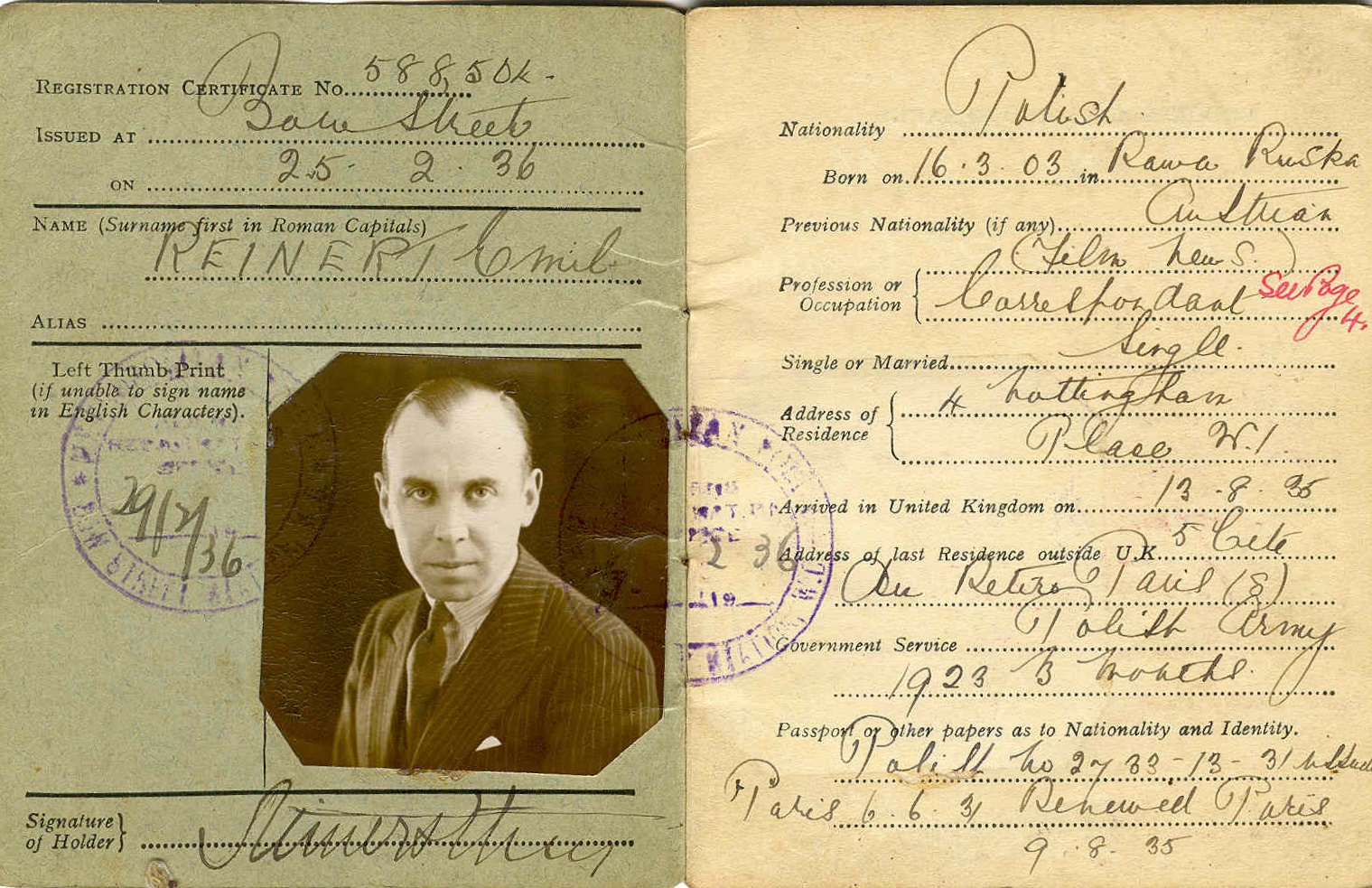
Certificate of Registration at time of Treachery on the High Seas, London, 1936

- 1930 Caïn, aventures des mers exotiques (as assistant director)
- 1936 Treachery on the High Seas
- 1939 The Blue Danube, Amore ribelle
- 1941 Der doppelte Matthias und seine Töchter,Das Fünfmäderlhaus
- 1946 Dropped from Heaven
- 1946 Destiny Has Fun
- 1947 Naughty Martine
- 1947 The Sharks of Gibraltar
- 1949 Thus Finishes the Night
- 1949 Fandango
- 1950 Quay of Grenelle The Strollers, Vipere, Dein Weg is dir bestimmt, Danger is a woman, Министерство труда
- 1950 Bed for Two; Rendezvous with Luck
- 1951 A Tale of Five Cities
- 1951 The Red Needle
- 1951 Dreaming Days
- 1951 Vienna Waltzes
- 1951 Maria Theresa
- 1952 Adventure in Vienna

=== As screen writer ===
- 1939 Le Danube bleu
- 1950 Rendez-vous avec la chance
- 1950 Les mémoires de la vache Yolande,
- 1951 The Red Needle
- 1951 Dreaming Days
- 1951 Vienna Waltzes

=== As producer and supervisor ===
- 1936 Gypsy Melody

== Actors and actresses ==
He directed among others the following actors and actresses:

- In Great Britain : Eva Bartok, Bebe Daniels, Bonar Colleano, Charles Farrell, Tom Helmore, Barbara Kelly, Gina Lollobrigida, Lana Morris and Lupe Vélez.
- In Austria : Rosa Albach-Retty, Axel von Ambesser, Cornell Borchers, Otto Wilhelm Fischer, Gustav Fröhlich, Attila Hörbiger, Franz Lederer, Marianne Schönauer, Anton Walbrook and Paula Wessely.
- In France : Michel Auclair, Raymond Bussières, André Claveau, Jean-Roger Caussimon, Claude Dauphin, Danièle Delorme, Arthur Devère, Dora Doll, Marcel Duhamel, Pierre Etchepare, Suzanne Flon, Louis de Funès, Margo Lion, Luis Mariano, Marcello Mastroianni, Maria Mauban, Georges Pitoëff, Dany Robin, Noël Roquevert, Louis Salou, Anne Vernon, Henri Vidal and Jean Vilar.

== Alternate names ==
Emil E. Reinert, Emile E. Reinert, Émile E Reinert, E. E. Reinert, E.E. Reinert
