= Strange Justice (1932 film) =

1932 film

- Directed by: Victor Schertzinger
- Screenplay by: William A. Drake
- Story by: William A. Drake
- Produced by: J. G. Bachmann
- Starring: Marian Marsh; Reginald Denny; Richard Bennett; Norman Foster; Irving Pichel
- Cinematography: Merritt B. Gerstad
- Edited by: William Morgan
- Music by: Victor Schertzinger
- Production company: RKO Pictures
- Distributed by: RKO Pictures
- Release date: October 7, 1932
- Running time: 64 minutes
- Country: United States
- Language: English

Strange Justice is a 1932 American pre-Code drama film directed by Victor Schertzinger, written by William A. Drake, and starring Marian Marsh, Reginald Denny, Richard Bennett, Norman Foster and Irving Pichel. It was released on October 7, 1932, by RKO Pictures.

== Cast ==
- Marian Marsh as Rose Abbott
- Reginald Denny as Henry I. Judson
- Richard Bennett as Kearney
- Norman Foster as Wally Baker
- Irving Pichel as L. D. Waters
- Nydia Westman as Gwen
- Thomas E. Jackson as Smith

== Preservation ==
A print is held by the Library of Congress.
