= Vicki Baum =

Austrian writer (1880–1960)

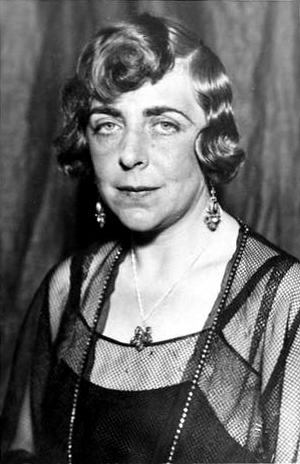
Portrait of Vicki Baum by Max Fenichel, c. 1930

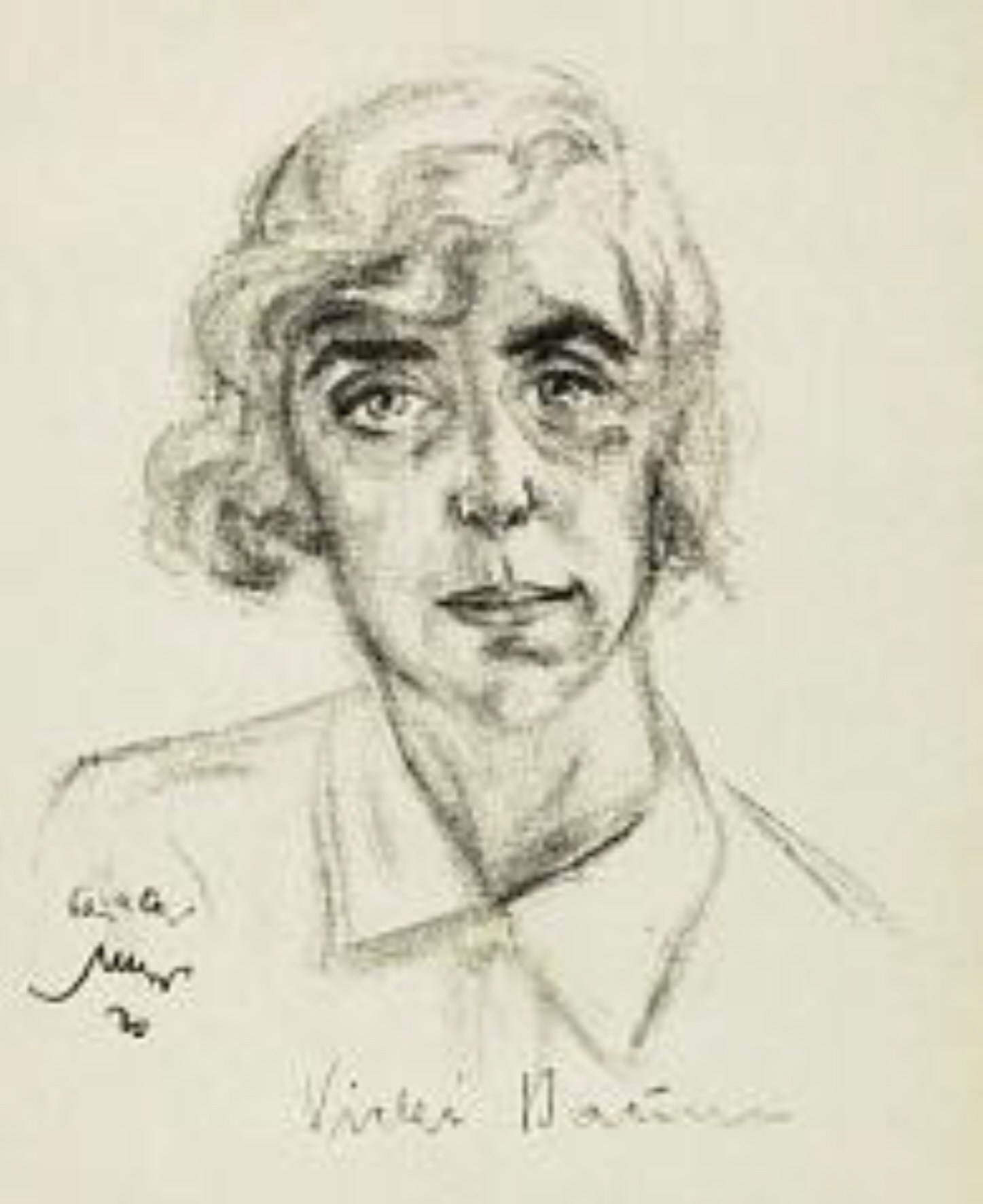
Drawing of Vicki Baum by Emil Stumpp, 1930

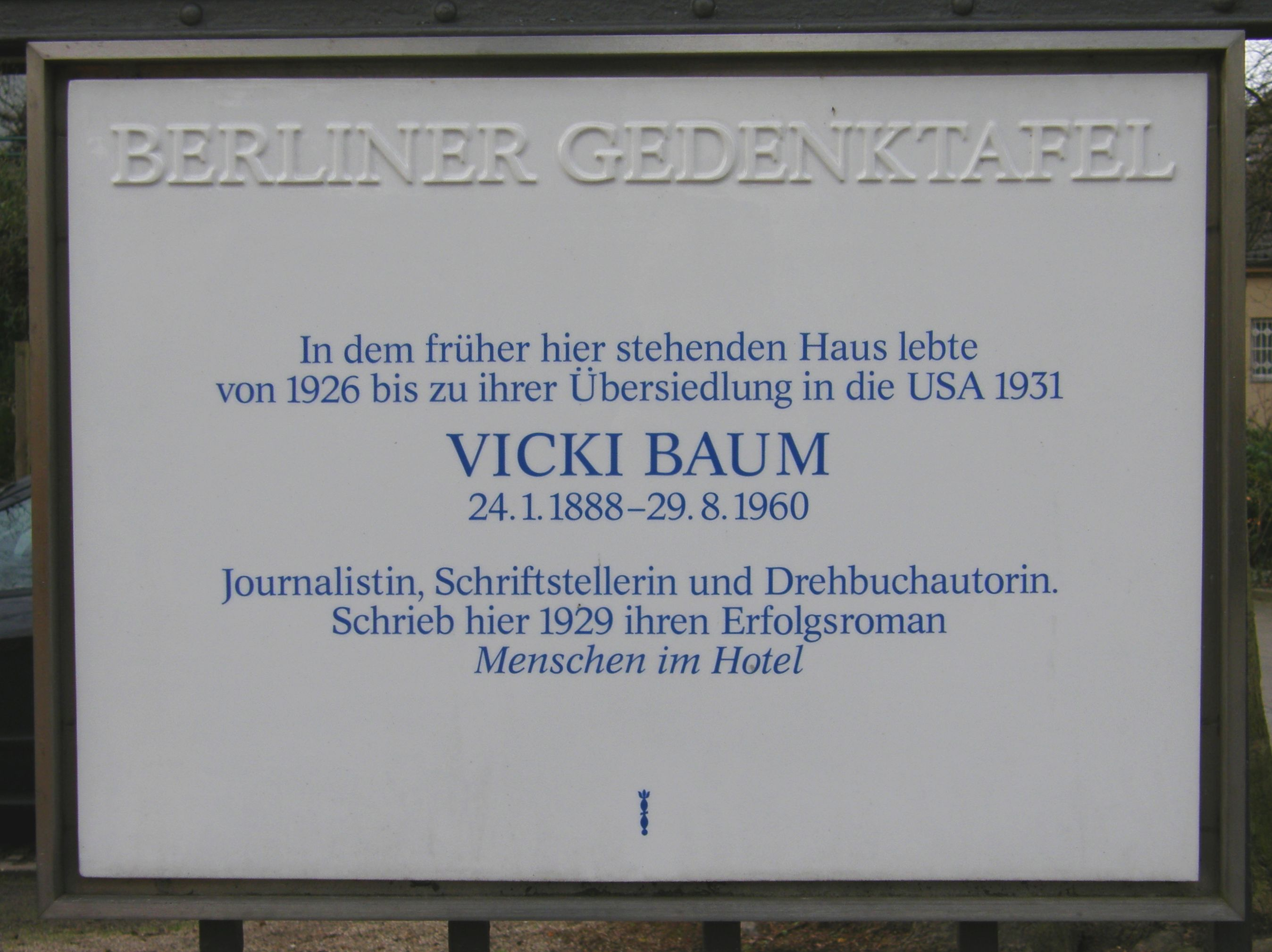
Commemorative tablet for Vicki Baum, unveiled in 1989 at the site of the house she lived in at Königsallee 45, Berlin

Hedwig "Vicki" Baum (/baʊm/; January 24, 1888 – August 29, 1960) was an Austrian writer. She is known for the novel Menschen im Hotel ('People at a Hotel', 1929 — published in English as Grand Hotel), one of her first international successes. It was made into a 1932 film and a 1989 Broadway musical.

== Education and personal life ==
Baum was born in Vienna into a Jewish family. Her mother Mathilde (née Donath) suffered from mental illness, and died of breast cancer when Vicki was still a child. Her father, described as "a tyrannical, hypochondriac" man, was a bank clerk who was killed in 1942 in Novi Sad (present-day Serbia) by soldiers of the Hungarian occupation. She began her artistic career as a musician playing the harp. She studied at the Vienna Conservatory and played in the Vienna Concert Society. She followed her conductor husband to Germany – to Hannover and Mannheim – in the years 1916–1923. She later worked as a journalist for the magazine Berliner Illustrirte Zeitung, published by Ullstein-Verlag in Berlin.

Baum was married twice. Her first, short-lived marriage, in 1906, was to Max Prels, an Austrian journalist who introduced her to the Viennese cultural scene; some of her first short stories were published under his name. They divorced in 1910, and in 1916, she married Richard Lert, a conductor. They had two sons, Wolfgang (b. 1917) and Peter (b. 1921).

== Boxing ==
Baum took up boxing in the late 1920s. She trained with Turkish prizefighter Sabri Mahir at his Studio for Boxing and Physical Culture in Berlin. Although the studio was open to men and women, Baum writes in her memoir, It Was All Quite Different (1964), that only a few women (including Marlene Dietrich and Carola Neher) trained there: "I don't know how the feminine element sneaked into those masculine realms, but in any case, only three or four of us were tough enough to go through with it." Positioning herself as a "New Woman", she asserted her independence in the traditionally male domain of boxing and challenged old gender categories. She writes that "Sabri put one limitation on women – no sparring in the ring, no black eyes, no bloody noses. Punching the ball was okay, though, to develop a pretty mean straight left, a quick one-two; a woman never knew when she might have to defend herself, right?" While training with Mahir, Baum mastered a rope-jumping routine that was designed for German heavyweight champion Franz Diener. She later credited her strong work ethic to the skills instilled in Mahir's studio.

== Writing career ==
Baum began writing in her teens but did not turn to writing professionally until after the birth of her first son. Her first book, Frühe Schatten: Die Geschichte einer Kindheit ('Early Shadows: The Story of a Childhood'), 1919, was published when she was 31. Thereafter she published a new novel nearly every year, with a career total of more than 50 books, at least ten of which were adapted as motion pictures in Hollywood. Her ninth novel, Stud. chem. Helene Willfüer ('Helene Willfüer, Student of Chemistry'), was her first major commercial success, selling over 100,000 copies. Baum is considered one of the first modern bestselling authors, and her books are seen as exemplifying New Objectivity within contemporary mainstream literature. Her protagonists were often strong, independent women caught up in turbulent times.

Baum is most famous for her 1929 novel Menschen im Hotel ('People at a Hotel'), which introduced the genre of the 'hotel novel'. It was made into a stage play in Berlin in 1929, directed by Max Reinhardt, and an Academy Award winning film, Grand Hotel, in 1932. Baum emigrated to the United States with her family after being invited to write the screenplay for this film. She settled in the Los Angeles area and worked as a screenwriter for ten years, with moderate success. With the rise of National Socialism in Germany, her literary works were denigrated as sensationalist and amoral and banned in the Third Reich as of 1935. She became an American citizen in 1938, and her post-World War II works were written in English rather than in German.

Baum visited Mexico, China, Egypt and Bali in 1935; and became close friends with the painter Walter Spies. With historical and cultural input from Spies, she wrote Liebe und Tod auf Bali, which was published in 1937 and translated into English as 'A Tale From Bali' and then later republished under its original German title as Love and Death in Bali. The book was about a family that was caught in the massacre in Bali in 1906 at the fall of the last independent kingdom in Bali to the Dutch.

== Last years ==
Baum's reputation went into a decline following World War II. She died of leukemia in Hollywood, California, in 1960, aged 72. Her memoir It Was All Quite Different was published posthumously in 1964.

== Honors ==
In 1999, the corner of Wiedner Hauptstraße and Waaggasse in Vienna was named Vicki-Baum-Platz in her honor. In 2009, a street was named after her in Berlin.

== Works ==
- 1919: Frühe Schatten: Die Geschichte einer Kindheit (Early Shadows: The Story of a Childhood)
- 1920: Der Eingang zur Bühne (Once In Vienna)
- 1921: Die Tänze der Ina Raffay (The Dances of Ina Raffay), republished as Kein Platz für Tränen in 1982
- 1922: Die anderen Tage (The Other Days)
- 1923: Die Welt ohne Sünde (The World Without Sin)
- 1924: Ulle der Zwerg (Ulle the Dwarf)
- 1926: Tanzpause (Pause in the Dance)
- 1927: Hell in Frauensee (Martin's Summer)
- 1927: Feme (Secret Sentence)
- 1928: Stud. chem. Helene Willfüer (Helene / Helene Willfüer, Student of Chemistry)
- 1929: Menschen im Hotel (Grand Hotel)
- 1930: Zwischenfall in Lohwinkel (Incident in Lohwinkel, Results of an Accident in the UK, and And Life Goes On in the US)
- 1930: Miniaturen (Miniatures)
- 1931: Pariser Platz 13 ("13 Paris Square")
- 1932: Leben ohne Geheimnis (Published in the UK and US as Falling Star, 1934)
- 1935: Das große Einmaleins / Rendezvous in Paris (Men Never Know / Rendezvous in Paris)
- 1936: Die Karriere der Doris Hart (Sing, Sister, Sing)
- 1937: Liebe und Tod auf Bali (Love and Death in Bali / A Tale from Bali / Tale of Bali)
- 1937: Hotel Shanghai (Shanghai '37. Also printed in the UK under the name Nanking Road)
- 1937: Der große Ausverkauf (Central Stores) Querido, Amsterdam.
- 1939: Die große Pause (Grand Opera)
- 1940: The Ship and the Shore / One Tropical Night (Es begann an Bord)
- 1941: The Christmas Carp (Der Weihnachtskarpfen)
- 1941: Marion Alive (Marion lebt / Marion)
- 1943: The Weeping Wood (Kautschuk / Cahuchu, Strom der Tränen)
- 1943: Hotel Berlin / Hotel Berlín 1943 / Berlin Hotel (Hotel Berlin / Hier stand ein Hotel), a sequel to Menschen im Hotel
- 1946: Mortgage on Life (Verpfändetes Leben)
- 1947: Flight of Fate (Schicksalsflug)
- 1948: Headless Angel (Clarinda)
- 1951: Danger from Deer (Vor Rehen wird gewarnt)
- 1953: The Mustard Seed (Kristall im Lehm)
- 1956: Written on Water (Flut und Flamme)
- 1957: Theme for Ballet (Die goldenen Schuhe)
- 1964: It Was All Quite Different (Es war alles ganz anders) -- memoir

== Filmography ==
- Assassination, directed by Richard Oswald (Germany, 1927, based on the novel Feme)
- The Three Women of Urban Hell, directed by Jaap Speyer (Germany, 1928, based on the novel Hell in Frauensee)
- Stud. chem. Helene Willfüer, directed by Fred Sauer (Germany, 1930, based on the novel Stud. chem. Helene Willfüer)
- Grand Hotel, directed by Edmund Goulding (1932, based on the novel Grand Hotel)
- Lake of Ladies, directed by Marc Allégret (France, 1934, based on the novel Hell in Frauensee)
- Helene, directed by Jean Benoît-Lévy (France, 1936, based on the novel Stud. chem. Helene Willfüer)
- Return at Dawn, directed by Henri Decoin (France, 1938, based on the short story Between 6 and 6)
- The Great Flamarion, directed by Anthony Mann (1945, based on the short story Big Shot)
- Hotel Berlin, directed by Peter Godfrey (1945, based on the novel Hotel Berlin)
- Week-End at the Waldorf, directed by Robert Z. Leonard (1945, based on the novel Grand Hotel)
- A Woman's Secret, directed by Nicholas Ray (1949, based on the novel Mortgage on Life)
- La Belle que voilà, directed by Jean-Paul Le Chanois (France, 1950, based on the novel Die Karriere der Doris Hart)
- Le Château de verre, directed by René Clément (France, 1950, based on the novel Das große Einmaleins)
- The Red Needle, directed by Emil-Edwin Reinert (France, 1951, based on the short story Das Joch)
- Dreaming Days, directed by Emil-Edwin Reinert (West Germany, 1951, based on the short story Das Joch)
- School for Love, directed by Marc Allégret (France, 1955, based on the novel Der Eingang zur Bühne)
- Studentin Helene Willfüer, directed by Rudolf Jugert (West Germany, 1956, based on the novel Stud. chem. Helene Willfüer)
- Love, directed by Horst Hächler (West Germany, 1956, based on the novel Danger from Deer)
- Menschen im Hotel, directed by Gottfried Reinhardt (West Germany, 1959, based on the novel Grand Hotel)
- Haus der Schönheit, directed by Eugen York (West Germany, 1963, TV film, based on the play Pariser Platz 13)
- Rendezvous in Paris, directed by Gabi Kubach (France/West Germany, 1982, based on the novel Das große Einmaleins)
- Die goldenen Schuhe, directed by Dietrich Haugk (West Germany, 1983, TV miniseries, based on the novel Theme for Ballet)
- Hell in Frauensee, directed by Wolfgang Panzer (West Germany, 1983, TV film, based on the novel Hell in Frauensee)
- Shanghai 1937, directed by Peter Patzak (Germany, 1997, TV miniseries, based on the novel Hotel Shanghai)

=== Screenwriter ===
- 1934: I Give My Love (dir. Karl Freund)
- 1935: The Night Is Young (dir. Dudley Murphy)
- 1938: The Great Waltz (uncredited) (dir. Dudley Murphy)
- 1939: Idiot's Delight (uncredited) (dir. Clarence_Brown)
- 1940: Dance, Girl, Dance (dir. Dorothy Arzner)
- 1942: Powder Town (dir. Rowland V. Lee)
- 1942: Girl Trouble (dir. Harold D. Schuster)
- 1945: Behind City Lights (dir. John English)
- 1947: Honeymoon (dir. William Keighley)
