= List of superlative Academy Award winners and nominees =

This article lists superlative Academy Award winners and nominees in major and acting categories. The lists are current as of the 98th Academy Awards ceremony.

== Best Picture ==
Superlative	Recipient	Record Set	Year	Notes
Most Awards	Ben-Hur	11 awards	1959	11 awards from 12 nominations
Most Awards	Titanic	11 awards	1997	11 awards from 14 nominations
Most Awards	The Lord of the Rings: The Return of the King	11 awards	2003	11 awards from 11 nominations
Most Nominations	Sinners	16 nominations	2025	4 wins from 16 nominations
Oldest Winner	Saul Zaentz	76 years old	1996	The English Patient
Oldest Nominee	Clint Eastwood	84 years old	2014	American Sniper
Youngest Winner	Carl Laemmle Jr.	22 years old	1930	All Quiet on the Western Front
Youngest Nominee	Carl Laemmle Jr.	22 years old	1930	All Quiet on the Western Front
Longest Winner	Gone with the Wind	3 hours 54 minutes	1939	8 awards from 13 nominations
Longest Nominee	Cleopatra	4 hours 2 minutes	1963	4 awards from 9 nominations
Shortest Winner	Marty	1 hour 28 minutes	1955	4 awards from 8 nominations
Shortest Nominee	She Done Him Wrong	1 hour 6 minutes	1933	0 awards from 1 nomination
Most Awards (Producer)	Sam Spiegel	3 awards	1962	3 awards from 4 nominations
Most Awards (Producer)	Saul Zaentz	3 awards	1996	3 awards from 3 nominations
Most Nominations (Producer)	Steven Spielberg	14 nominations	2025	1 award from 14 nominations
Most Awards (Studio)	Metro-Goldwyn-Mayer	5 awards	1942	5 awards from 40 nominations
Most Nominations (Studio)	Metro-Goldwyn-Mayer	40 nominations	1950	5 awards from 40 nominations

== Best Director ==
Superlative	Director	Record set	Year	Notes
Most Awards	John Ford	4 awards	1935, 1940, 1941, 1952	Awards resulted from 5 nominations
Most Nominations	William Wyler	12 nominations	1936, 1939, 1940, 1941, 1942, 1946, 1949, 1951, 1953, 1956, 1959, 1965	Nominations resulted in 3 awards
Oldest Winner	Clint Eastwood	74 years old	2004	Million Dollar Baby
Oldest Nominee	Martin Scorsese	81 years old	2023	Killers of the Flower Moon
Youngest Winner	Damien Chazelle	32 years old	2016	La La Land
Youngest Nominee	John Singleton	24 years old	1991	Boyz n the Hood

== Best Adapted Screenplay ==
Superlative	Writer	Record set	Year	Notes
Most Awards	Michael Wilson	2 awards	1951, 1957	Awards resulted from 5 nominations
Most Awards	George Seaton	2 awards	1947, 1954	Awards resulted from 4 nominations
Most Awards	Robert Bolt	2 awards	1965, 1966	Awards resulted from 3 nominations
Most Awards	Francis Ford Coppola	2 awards	1972, 1974	Awards resulted from 3 nominations
Most Awards	Christopher Hampton	2 awards	1988, 2020-2021	Awards resulted from 3 nominations
Most Awards	Joseph L. Mankiewicz	2 awards	1949, 1950	Awards resulted from 3 nominations
Most Awards	Alexander Payne	2 awards	2004, 2011	Awards resulted from 3 nominations
Most Awards	Ruth Prawer Jhabvala	2 awards	1986, 1992	Awards resulted from 3 nominations
Most Awards	Alvin Sargent	2 awards	1977, 1980	Awards resulted from 3 nominations
Most Awards	Mario Puzo	2 awards	1972, 1974	Awards resulted from 2 nominations
Most Nominations	Billy Wilder	7 nominations	1939, 1941, 1944, 1945, 1948, 1954, 1959	Nominations resulted in 1 award: The Lost Weekend (1945) — Co-written with Charles Brackett
Oldest Winner	James Ivory	89 years old	2017	Call Me by Your Name
Oldest Nominee	James Ivory	89 years old	2017	Call Me by Your Name
Youngest Winner	Charlie Wachtel	32 years old	2018	BlacKkKlansman (Co-written with Spike Lee, David Rabinowitz, and Kevin Willmott)
Youngest Nominee	Joseph L. Mankiewicz	22 years old	1930-1931	Skippy (Co-written with Don Marquis, Norman Z. McLeod, and Sam Mintz)

== Best Original Screenplay ==
Superlative	Writer	Record set	Year	Notes
Most Awards	Woody Allen	3 awards	1977, 1986, 2011	Awards resulted from 16 nominations
Most Nominations	Woody Allen	16 nominations	1977, 1978, 1979, 1984, 1985, 1986, 1987, 1989, 1990, 1992, 1994, 1995, 1997, 2005, 2011, 2013	Nominations resulted in 3 awards
Oldest Winner	Woody Allen	76 years old	2011	Midnight in Paris
Oldest Nominee	Charles Crichton	78 years old	1988	A Fish Called Wanda (Co-written with John Cleese)
Youngest Winner	Ben Affleck	25 years old	1997	Good Will Hunting (Co-written with Matt Damon, 27 years old)
Youngest Nominee	John Singleton	24 years old	1991	Boyz n the Hood

== Best Actor in a Leading Role ==
Superlative	Actor	Record set	Year	Notes
Most Awards	Daniel Day-Lewis	3 awards	1989, 2007, 2012	Awards resulted from 6 nominations
Most Nominations	Spencer Tracy	9 nominations	1936, 1937, 1938, 1950, 1955, 1958, 1960, 1961, 1967	Nominations resulted in 2 awards
Most Nominations	Laurence Olivier	9 nominations	1939, 1940, 1946, 1948, 1956, 1960, 1965, 1972, 1978	Nominations resulted in 1 award
Oldest Winner	Anthony Hopkins	83 years old	2020/2021	The Father
Oldest Nominee	Anthony Hopkins	83 years old	2020/2021	The Father
Youngest Winner	Adrien Brody	29 years old	2002	The Pianist
Youngest Nominee	Jackie Cooper	9 years old	1930/1931	Skippy

== Best Actress in a Leading Role ==
Superlative	Actress	Record set	Year	Notes
Most Awards	Katharine Hepburn	4 awards	1932/1933, 1967, 1968, 1981	Awards resulted from 12 nominations
Most Nominations	Meryl Streep	17 nominations	1981, 1982, 1983, 1985, 1987, 1988, 1990, 1995, 1998, 1999, 2006, 2008, 2009, 2011, 2013, 2016, 2017	Nominations resulted in 2 awards
Oldest Winner	Jessica Tandy	80 years old	1989	Driving Miss Daisy
Oldest Nominee	Emmanuelle Riva	85 years old	2012	Amour
Youngest Winner	Marlee Matlin	21 years old	1986	Children of a Lesser God
Youngest Nominee	Quvenzhané Wallis	9 years old	2012	Beasts of the Southern Wild

== Best Actor in a Supporting Role ==
Superlative	Actor	Record set	Year	Notes
Most Awards	Walter Brennan	3 awards	1936, 1938, 1940	Awards resulted from 4 nominations
Most Nominations	Walter Brennan	4 nominations	1936, 1938, 1940, 1941	Nominations resulted in 3 awards
Most Nominations	Jack Nicholson	4 nominations	1969, 1981, 1983, 1992	Nominations resulted in 1 award
Most Nominations	Mark Ruffalo	4 nominations	2010, 2014, 2015, 2023	Nominations resulted in no awards
Most Nominations	Claude Rains	4 nominations	1939, 1943, 1944, 1946	Nominations resulted in no awards
Most Nominations	Arthur Kennedy	4 nominations	1949, 1955, 1957, 1958	Nominations resulted in no awards
Most Nominations	Robert Duvall	4 nominations	1972, 1979, 1998, 2014	Nominations resulted in no awards
Most Nominations	Jeff Bridges	4 nominations	1971, 1974, 2000, 2016	Nominations resulted in no awards
Most Nominations	Al Pacino	4 nominations	1972, 1990, 1992, 2019	Nominations resulted in no awards
Oldest Winner	Christopher Plummer	82 years old	2011	Beginners
Oldest Nominee	Christopher Plummer	88 years old	2017	All the Money in the World
Youngest Winner	Timothy Hutton	20 years old	1980	Ordinary People
Youngest Nominee	Justin Henry	8 years old	1979	Kramer vs. Kramer

== Best Actress in a Supporting Role ==
Superlative	Actress	Record set	Year	Notes
Most Awards	Shelley Winters	2 awards	1959, 1965	Awards resulted from 3 nominations
Most Awards	Dianne Wiest	2 awards	1986, 1994	Awards resulted from 3 nominations
Most Nominations	Thelma Ritter	6 nominations	1950, 1951, 1952, 1953, 1959, 1962	Nominations resulted in no awards
Oldest Winner	Peggy Ashcroft	77 years old	1984	A Passage to India
Oldest Nominee	Gloria Stuart	87 years old	1997	Titanic
Youngest Winner	Tatum O'Neal	10 years old	1973	Paper Moon
Youngest Nominee	Tatum O'Neal	10 years old	1973	Paper Moon

== Combined Academy Awards for Best Actor in a Leading Role and Best Actor in a Supporting Role ==
Superlative	Actor	Record set	Year	Notes
Most Awards	Walter Brennan	3 awards	1936, 1938, 1940	Awards resulted from 4 nominations
Most Awards	Jack Nicholson	3 awards	1975, 1983, 1997	Awards resulted from 12 nominations
Most Awards	Daniel Day-Lewis	3 awards	1989, 2007, 2012	Awards resulted from 6 nominations
Most Awards	Sean Penn	3 awards	2003, 2008, 2025	Awards resulted from 6 nominations
Most Nominations	Jack Nicholson	12 nominations – 8 for Best Actor in a Leading Role, and 4 for Best Supporting Actor	1969, 1970, 1973, 1974, 1975, 1981, 1983, 1985, 1987, 1992, 1997, 2002	Nominations resulted in 3 awards

== Combined Academy Awards for Best Actress in a Leading Role and Best Actress in a Supporting Role ==
Superlative	Actress	Record set	Year	Notes
Most Awards	Katharine Hepburn	4 awards for Best Actress in a Leading Role	1932/1933, 1967, 1968, 1981	Awards resulted from 12 nominations
Most Nominations	Meryl Streep	21 nominations – 17 for Best Actress in a Leading Role, and 4 for Best Supporting Actress	1978, 1979, 1981, 1982, 1983, 1985, 1987, 1988, 1990, 1995, 1998, 1999, 2002, 2006, 2008, 2009, 2011, 2013, 2014, 2016, 2017	Nominations resulted in 3 awards

Note
Walt Disney is the highest-honored individual with wins and nominations in any category in the Academy Awards, with fifty-nine nominations and twenty-two Oscar wins (as well as four Honorary Awards), including a record four in one year, which was tied by Sean Baker for Anora in 2025.

== Performances of the same character ==
Multiple performers nominated for portraying the same role in different films, including the same actor playing the same role in sequels.

Table key
†	Indicates the actor either was nominated or won posthumously.
§	Indicates the actor refused to accept their award or nomination.

Character	Actor	Film	Year	Category	Status
Anita Palacio	Rita Moreno	West Side Story	1961	Best Supporting Actress	Won
Anita Palacio	Ariana DeBose	West Side Story	2021	Best Supporting Actress	Won
Billie Holiday (née Eleanora Fagan)	Diana Ross	Lady Sings the Blues	1972	Best Lead Actress	Nominated
Billie Holiday (née Eleanora Fagan)	Andra Day	The United States vs. Billie Holiday	2020/ 2021	Best Lead Actress	Nominated
Bob Dylan / Jude Quinn	Timothée Chalamet	A Complete Unknown	2024	Best Lead Actor	Nominated
Bob Dylan / Jude Quinn	Cate Blanchett	I'm Not There	2007	Best Supporting Actress	Nominated
The Creature (a.k.a. Frankenstein's Monster) / Bella Baxter	Jacob Elordi	Frankenstein	2025	Best Supporting Actor	Nominated
The Creature (a.k.a. Frankenstein's Monster) / Bella Baxter	Emma Stone	Poor Things	2023	Best Lead Actress	Won
Cyrano de Bergerac	José Ferrer	Cyrano de Bergerac	1950	Best Lead Actor	Won
Cyrano de Bergerac	Gérard Depardieu	Cyrano de Bergerac	1990	Best Lead Actor	Nominated
Dame Iris Murdoch	Judi Dench	Iris	2001	Best Lead Actress	Nominated
Dame Iris Murdoch	Kate Winslet	Iris	2001	Best Supporting Actress	Nominated
Don Michael Corleone	Al Pacino	The Godfather	1972	Best Supporting Actor	Nominated
Don Michael Corleone	Al Pacino	The Godfather Part II	1974	Best Lead Actor	Nominated
Don Vito Corleone (né Andolini)	Robert De Niro	The Godfather Part II	1974	Best Supporting Actor	Won
Don Vito Corleone (né Andolini)	Marlon Brando §	The Godfather	1972	Best Lead Actor	Won
Eliza Doolittle / Susan "Rita" White / Vivian Ward / Linda Ash	Wendy Hiller	Pygmalion	1938	Best Lead Actress	Nominated
Eliza Doolittle / Susan "Rita" White / Vivian Ward / Linda Ash	Julie Walters	Educating Rita	1983	Best Lead Actress	Nominated
Eliza Doolittle / Susan "Rita" White / Vivian Ward / Linda Ash	Julia Roberts	Pretty Woman	1990	Best Lead Actress	Nominated
Eliza Doolittle / Susan "Rita" White / Vivian Ward / Linda Ash	Mira Sorvino	Mighty Aphrodite	1995	Best Supporting Actress	Won
Elizabeth Bennet / Bridget Jones	Keira Knightley	Pride & Prejudice	2005	Best Lead Actress	Nominated
Elizabeth Bennet / Bridget Jones	Renée Zellweger	Bridget Jones’s Diary	2001	Best Lead Actress	Nominated
"Fast Eddie" Felson	Paul Newman	The Hustler	1961	Best Lead Actor	Nominated
"Fast Eddie" Felson	Paul Newman	The Color of Money	1986	Best Lead Actor	Won
Father Chuck O'Malley	Bing Crosby	The Bells of St. Mary's	1945	Best Lead Actor	Nominated
Father Chuck O'Malley	Bing Crosby	Going My Way	1944	Best Lead Actor	Won
Father Fitzgibbon	Barry Fitzgerald^{[A]}	Going My Way	1944	Best Lead Actor	Nominated
Father Fitzgibbon	Barry Fitzgerald^{[A]}	Going My Way	1944	Best Supporting Actor	Won
Howard Hughes	Jason Robards Jr.	Melvin (and Howard)	1980	Best Supporting Actor	Nominated
Howard Hughes	Leonardo DiCaprio	The Aviator	2004	Best Lead Actor	Nominated
Joe Pendleton	Robert Montgomery	Here Comes Mr. Jordan	1941	Best Lead Actor	Nominated
Joe Pendleton	Warren Beatty	Heaven Can Wait	1978	Best Lead Actor	Nominated
The Joker / Arthur Fleck (a.k.a. Joker)	Heath Ledger †	The Dark Knight	2008	Best Supporting Actor	Won
The Joker / Arthur Fleck (a.k.a. Joker)	Joaquin Phoenix	Joker	2019	Best Lead Actor	Won
Josephine "Jo" March	Winona Ryder	Little Women	1994	Best Lead Actress	Nominated
Josephine "Jo" March	Saoirse Ronan	Little Women	2019	Best Lead Actress	Nominated
King Henry II of England	Peter O'Toole	Becket	1964	Best Lead Actor	Nominated
King Henry II of England	Peter O'Toole	The Lion in Winter	1968	Best Lead Actor	Nominated
King Henry V of England	Laurence Olivier	Henry V	1946	Best Lead Actor	Nominated
King Henry V of England	Kenneth Branagh	Henry V	1989	Best Lead Actor	Nominated
King Henry VIII of England and Ireland	Charles Laughton	The Private Life of Henry VIII	1932/ 1933	Best Lead Actor	Won
King Henry VIII of England and Ireland	Robert Shaw	A Man for All Seasons	1966	Best Supporting Actor	Nominated
King Henry VIII of England and Ireland	Richard Burton	Anne of the Thousand Days	1969	Best Lead Actor	Nominated
Leda Caruso	Olivia Colman	The Lost Daughter	2021	Best Lead Actress	Nominated
Leda Caruso	Jessie Buckley	The Lost Daughter	2021	Best Supporting Actress	Nominated
Leslie Crosbie	Jeanne Eagels †	The Letter	1928/ 1929	Best Lead Actress	Nominated
Leslie Crosbie	Bette Davis	The Letter	1940	Best Lead Actress	Nominated
Marilyn Monroe (née Norma Jeane Mortenson)	Michelle Williams	My Week with Marilyn	2011	Best Lead Actress	Nominated
Marilyn Monroe (née Norma Jeane Mortenson)	Ana de Armas	Blonde	2022	Best Lead Actress	Nominated
Max "Pop" Corkle	James Gleason	Here Comes Mr. Jordan	1941	Best Supporting Actor	Nominated
Max "Pop" Corkle	Jack Warden	Heaven Can Wait	1978	Best Supporting Actor	Nominated
Mr. Charles Edward Chipping / Mr. Arthur Chipping	Robert Donat	Goodbye, Mr. Chips	1939	Best Lead Actor	Won
Mr. Charles Edward Chipping / Mr. Arthur Chipping	Peter O'Toole	Goodbye, Mr. Chips	1969	Best Lead Actor	Nominated
Norman Maine (né Hinkle) / Norman Maine (né Ernest Sidney Gubbins) / Jackson "Jack" Maine	Fredric March	A Star Is Born	1937	Best Lead Actor	Nominated
Norman Maine (né Hinkle) / Norman Maine (né Ernest Sidney Gubbins) / Jackson "Jack" Maine	James Mason	A Star Is Born	1954	Best Lead Actor	Nominated
Norman Maine (né Hinkle) / Norman Maine (né Ernest Sidney Gubbins) / Jackson "Jack" Maine	Bradley Cooper	A Star Is Born	2018	Best Lead Actor	Nominated
President Abraham Lincoln	Raymond Massey	Abe Lincoln in Illinois	1940	Best Lead Actor	Nominated
President Abraham Lincoln	Daniel Day-Lewis	Lincoln	2012	Best Lead Actor	Won
President Richard Nixon	Anthony Hopkins	Nixon	1995	Best Lead Actor	Nominated
President Richard Nixon	Frank Langella	Frost/Nixon	2008	Best Lead Actor	Nominated
Professor Henry Higgins / Henry Higgins / Dr. Frank Bryant	Leslie Howard	Pygmalion	1938	Best Lead Actor	Nominated
Professor Henry Higgins / Henry Higgins / Dr. Frank Bryant	Rex Harrison	My Fair Lady	1964	Best Lead Actor	Won
Professor Henry Higgins / Henry Higgins / Dr. Frank Bryant	Michael Caine	Educating Rita	1983	Best Lead Actor	Nominated
Queen Elizabeth I of England and Ireland	Judi Dench	Shakespeare in Love	1998	Best Supporting Actress	Won
Queen Elizabeth I of England and Ireland	Cate Blanchett	Elizabeth	1998	Best Lead Actress	Nominated
Queen Elizabeth I of England and Ireland	Cate Blanchett	Elizabeth: The Golden Age	2007	Best Lead Actress	Nominated
Reuben J. "Rooster" Cogburn, D.U.M.S.	John Wayne	True Grit	1969	Best Lead Actor	Won
Reuben J. "Rooster" Cogburn, D.U.M.S.	Jeff Bridges	True Grit	2010	Best Lead Actor	Nominated
Robert "Rocky" Balboa (a.k.a. "The Italian Stallion")	Sylvester Stallone	Rocky	1976	Best Lead Actor	Nominated
Robert "Rocky" Balboa (a.k.a. "The Italian Stallion")	Sylvester Stallone	Creed	2015	Best Supporting Actor	Nominated
Rose DeWitt-Bukater	Gloria Stuart	Titanic	1997	Best Supporting Actress	Nominated
Rose DeWitt-Bukater	Kate Winslet	Titanic	1997	Best Lead Actress	Nominated
Sofia Johnson	Oprah Winfrey	The Color Purple	1985	Best Supporting Actress	Nominated
Sofia Johnson	Danielle Brooks	The Color Purple	2023	Best Supporting Actress	Nominated
Tybalt / Bernardo Vasquez-Nuñez	Basil Rathbone	Romeo and Juliet	1936	Best Supporting Actor	Nominated
Tybalt / Bernardo Vasquez-Nuñez	George Chakiris	West Side Story	1961	Best Supporting Actor	Won
Vicki Lester (née Esther Victoria Blodgett) / Vicki Lester (née Esther Blodgett) / Ally Maine (née Campano)	Janet Gaynor	A Star Is Born	1937	Best Lead Actress	Nominated
Vicki Lester (née Esther Victoria Blodgett) / Vicki Lester (née Esther Blodgett) / Ally Maine (née Campano)	Judy Garland	A Star Is Born	1954	Best Lead Actress	Nominated
Vicki Lester (née Esther Victoria Blodgett) / Vicki Lester (née Esther Blodgett) / Ally Maine (née Campano)	Lady Gaga	A Star Is Born	2018	Best Lead Actress	Nominated
Vincent van Gogh	Kirk Douglas	Lust for Life	1956	Best Lead Actor	Nominated
Vincent van Gogh	Willem Dafoe	At Eternity's Gate	2018	Best Lead Actor	Nominated

=== Notes ===
- ^{A} In a nomination anomaly, Barry Fitzgerald was nominated for both Best Leading and Supporting Actor for the same character/performance in the same film, Going My Way (1944). Due to this instance, a rule change was implemented to prevent future occurrences (until a further rule change enacted in May 2026).

== Portrayals of multiple characters or alter-egos in one film ==
Performers nominated for playing multiple characters in one film. This also includes characters who portray alter-egos, such as drag characters or Dissociative Identity Disorder.

Year	Actor	Characters	Film	Category	Status
1931/ 1932	Fredric March	Dr. Henry Jekyll / Mr. Edward Hyde	Dr. Jekyll and Mr. Hyde	Best Lead Actor	Won
1940	Charlie Chaplin	Adenoid Hynkel — Dictator of Tomania / A Jewish Barber	The Great Dictator	Best Lead Actor	Nominated
1942	Teresa Wright	Carol Beldon / Mrs. Kay Miniver (young)	Mrs. Miniver	Best Supporting Actress	Won
1952	José Ferrer	Henri de Toulouse-Lautrec / Comte Alphonse de Toulouse-Lautrec	Moulin Rouge	Best Lead Actor	Nominated
1957	Joanne Woodward	Eve Black / Eve White / Jane	The Three Faces of Eve	Best Lead Actress	Won
1959	Jack Lemmon	Jerry / Daphne	Some Like It Hot	Best Lead Actor	Nominated
1964	Peter Sellers	Group Captain Lionel Mandrake / President Merkin Muffley / Dr. Strangelove	Dr. Strangelove, or: How I Learned to Stop Worrying and Love the Bomb	Best Lead Actor	Nominated
1965	Lee Marvin	Kid Shelleen / Tim Strawn	Cat Ballou	Best Lead Actor	Won
1981	Meryl Streep	Anna / Miss Sarah Woodruff	The French Lieutenant's Woman	Best Lead Actress	Nominated
1982	Julie Andrews	Victoria Grant / Count Victor Grazinski	Victor/Victoria	Best Lead Actress	Nominated
1982	Dustin Hoffman	Michael Dorsey / Dorothy Michaels	Tootsie	Best Lead Actor	Nominated
1985	Klaus Maria Brandauer	Baron Bror von Blixen-Finecke / Baron Hans von Blixen-Finecke	Out of Africa	Best Supporting Actor	Nominated
1996	Edward Norton	Aaron Stampler / Roy	Primal Fear	Best Supporting Actor	Nominated
2002	Nicolas Cage	Charlie Kaufman / Donald Kaufman	Adaptation.	Best Lead Actor	Nominated
2022	Michelle Yeoh	Evelyn Quan Wang / Alpha-Evelyn / other multiverse versions	Everything Everywhere All at Once	Best Lead Actress	Won
2022	Ke Huy Quan	Waymond Wang / Alpha-Waymond / other multiverse versions	Everything Everywhere All at Once	Best Supporting Actor	Won
2022	Stephanie Hsu	Joy Wang / Jobu Topaki / other multiverse versions	Everything Everywhere All at Once	Best Supporting Actress	Nominated
2022	Jamie Lee Curtis	Deirdre Beaubeirdre / other multiverse versions	Everything Everywhere All at Once	Best Supporting Actress	Won
2025	Michael B. Jordan	Elijah "Smoke" Moore / Elias "Stack" Moore	Sinners	Best Lead Actor	Won
2025	Wagner Moura	Armando Solimões "Marcelo Alves" / Fernando Solimões (adult)	The Secret Agent	Best Lead Actor	Nominated

== See also ==
- List of Academy Award records
- List of oldest and youngest Academy Award winners and nominees
- List of actors nominated for multiple Academy Awards in the same year
- List of people who have won multiple Academy Awards in a single year
