= San Francisco (1936 film) =

1936 film by D. W. Griffith, W. S. Van Dyke

- Original film poster
- Directed by: W. S. Van Dyke
- Written by: Robert E. Hopkins; Anita Loos
- Produced by: John Emerson; Bernard H. Hyman
- Starring: Clark Gable; Jeanette MacDonald; Spencer Tracy; Jack Holt; Jessie Ralph; Ted Healy
- Cinematography: Oliver T. Marsh
- Edited by: Tom Held
- Music by: Walter Jurmann; Bronisław Kaper; Edward Ward
- Production company: Metro-Goldwyn-Mayer
- Distributed by: Loew's Inc.
- Release date: June 26, 1936
- Running time: 115 minutes
- Country: United States
- Language: English
- Budget: $1.3 million
- Box office: $5.3 million

San Francisco is a 1936 American musical-drama disaster film directed by W. S. Van Dyke, based on the April 18, 1906 San Francisco earthquake. The film stars Clark Gable, Jeanette MacDonald and Spencer Tracy. MacDonald's singing helped make this film the highest grossing international hit of the year, coming on the heels of her other 1936 blockbuster, Rose Marie.

== Plot ==
On New Year's Eve, 1905, saloon keeper "Blackie" Norton hires Mary Blake to sing in his bar, the Paradise Club on Pacific Street in the notorious Barbary Coast of San Francisco. Mary becomes a star attraction at the Paradise, especially for her signature tune, "San Francisco". Blackie's friend Mat predicts that Mary will not stay long on the "Coast".

Blackie decides to run for the San Francisco Board of Supervisors at the behest of his childhood friend Father Tim Mullen, who believes Blackie can use the supervisor position to implement reform.

Mary is hired by the Tivoli Opera House on Market Street, where she becomes involved with Nob Hill scion Jack Burley. After her performance one night, Blackie visits Mary in her dressing room. Realizing she still loves him, Mary asks him to marry her. Blackie agrees, but their reunion is soon interrupted by Burley, who had proposed to Mary prior to the show. Burley appeals to Mary, but Blackie presents Mary with an ultimatum by asking if she wants to marry him or stay at the Tivoli. Mary chooses to return to the Paradise.

Backstage on the opening night of her return performance, Father Tim drops in and is angered by Mary's skimpy stage costume. He defies Blackie to put her on the stage in front of the rowdy Paradise audience. Mary decides to leave with the priest after Blackie strikes him in the face.

Mary goes back to Burley and meets his mother at her Nob Hill mansion. Mrs. Burley tells Mary that she had a "Blackie" in her younger days, but chose to marry the more steadfast Burley. This cements Mary's decision to accept Burley's proposal of marriage.

On the evening of April 17, 1906, Burley has the San Francisco Police Department raid the Paradise. Blackie, distraught about the future of his club, ends up at the city's annual Chickens Ball. After performances by acts from the other clubs, the MC requests the Paradise's entry. When no one steps on stage, Mary, just having learned of the club's closing, enters the competition on behalf of the Paradise. She rouses the audience to join in a chorus of "San Francisco" and wins, but Blackie refuses the prize money and states that Mary had no right to sing on behalf of his club. Mary is about to leave the ball with Burley when the earthquake hits the city.

As Blackie wanders the devastated city searching for Mary, he finds Burley dead and Mrs. Burley distraught. The police begin dynamiting buildings in order to control the fires. Blackie also comes upon a dying Mat, who tells Blackie he was wrong about Mary. Blackie later meets Father Tim, who takes him to a homeless camp in Golden Gate Park. Blackie hears Mary singing "Nearer, My God, to Thee" with those in mourning. As they reunite, word spreads through the camp that "The fire's out!" As people shout about building a new San Francisco, Blackie and Mary join the crowd as they leave the park marching arm-in-arm, singing "The Battle Hymn of the Republic".

== Cast ==
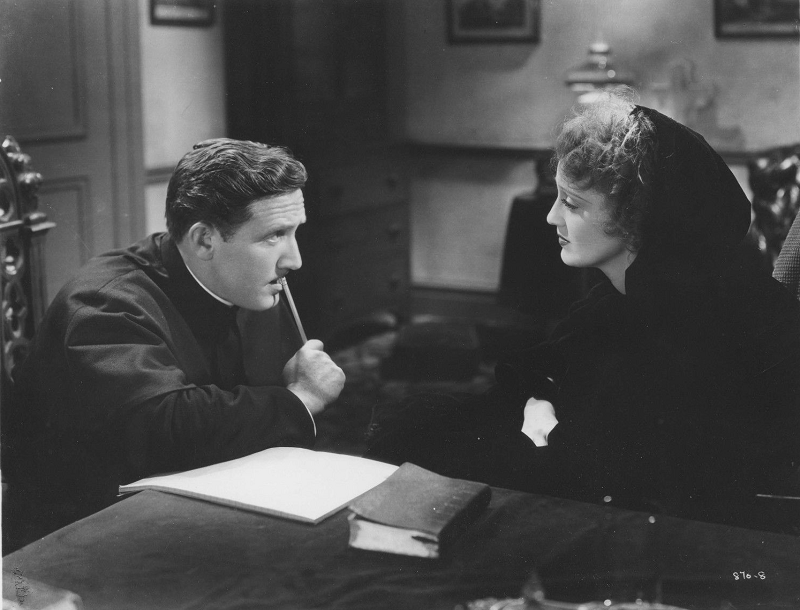
Spencer Tracy and Jeanette MacDonald

- Clark Gable as Blackie Norton
- Jeanette MacDonald as Mary Blake
- Spencer Tracy as Father Tim Mullin
- Jack Holt as Jack Burley
- Jessie Ralph as Mrs. Burley
- Ted Healy as Mat
- Shirley Ross as Trixie
- Margaret Irving as Della Bailey
- Harold Huber as Babe
- Edgar Kennedy as Sheriff
- Al Shean as The Professor
- William Ricciardi as Signor Baldini
- Kenneth Harlan as Chick
- Roger Imhof as Alaska
- Charles Judels as Tony (credited as Charles Judells)
- Russell Simpson as Red Kelly
- Bert Roach as Freddie Duane
- Warren B. Hymer as Hazeltine
- Frank Mayo as Dealer (uncredited)
- Jerry Tucker as Choirboy (uncredited)
- Frank Sheridan as Founders' Club Member (uncredited)
- James Murray as Earthquake Survivor (uncredited)
- Ralph Lewis as Founders' Club Member

== Production ==
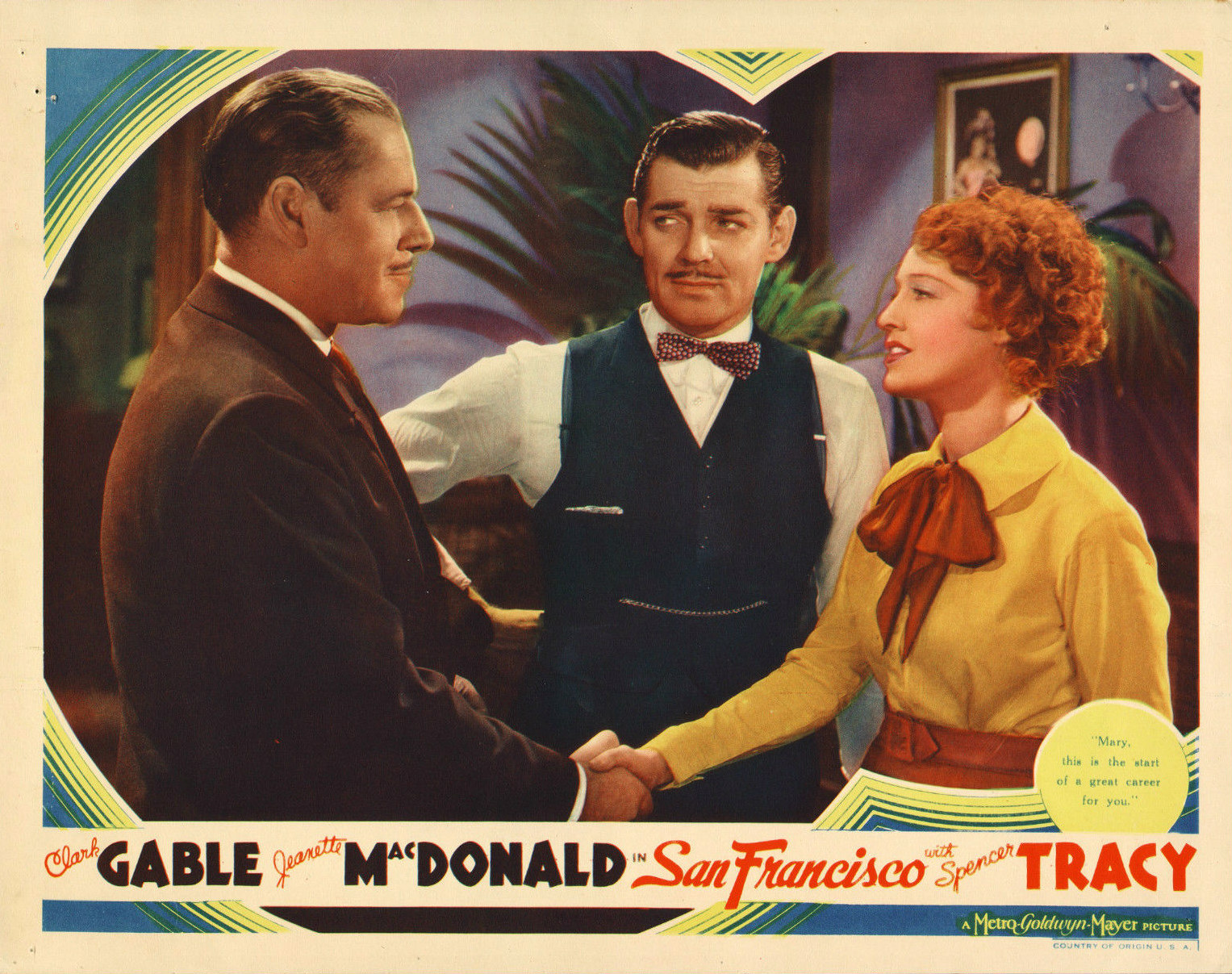
Lobby card

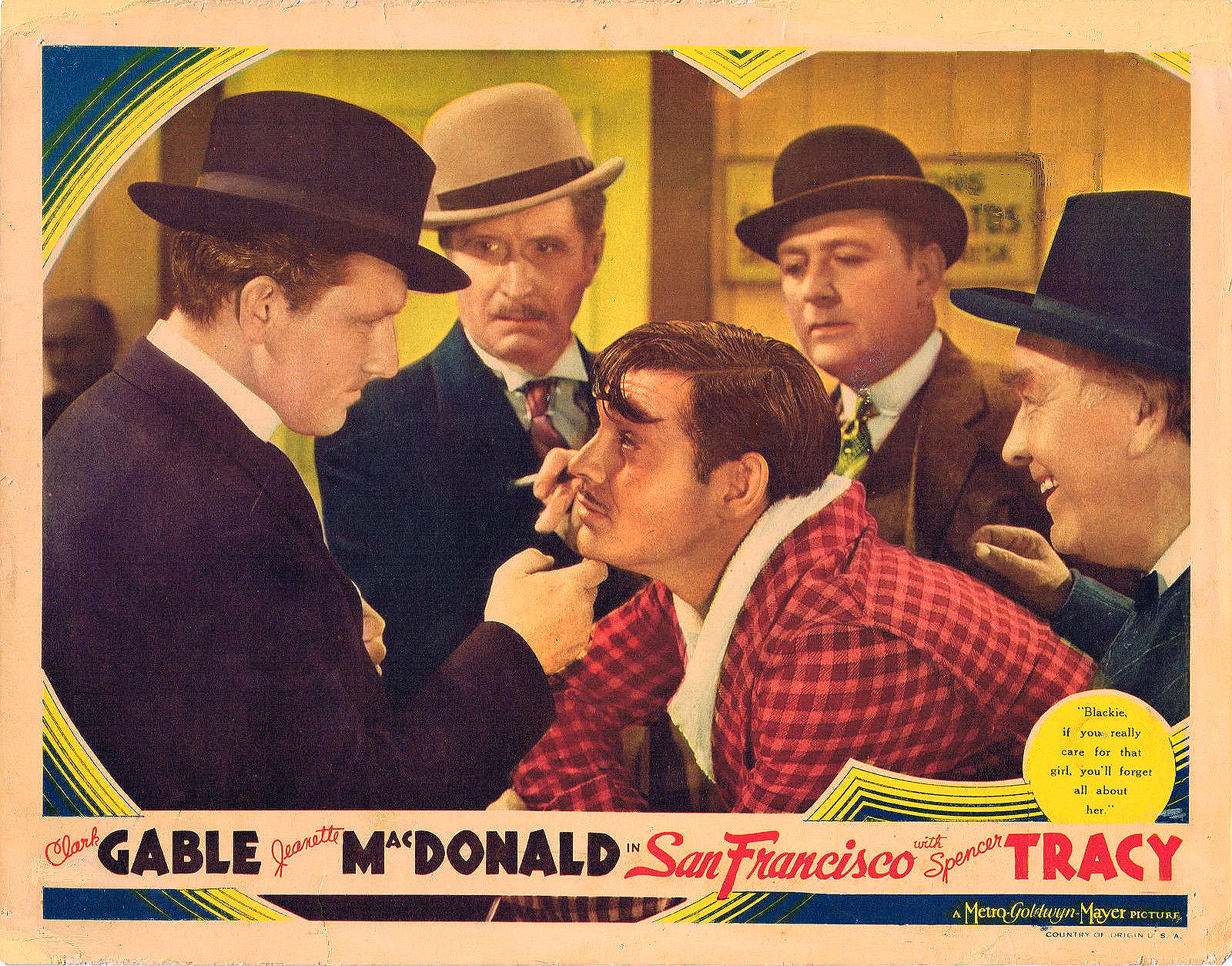
Lobby card with Spencer Tracy (left) and Clark Gable

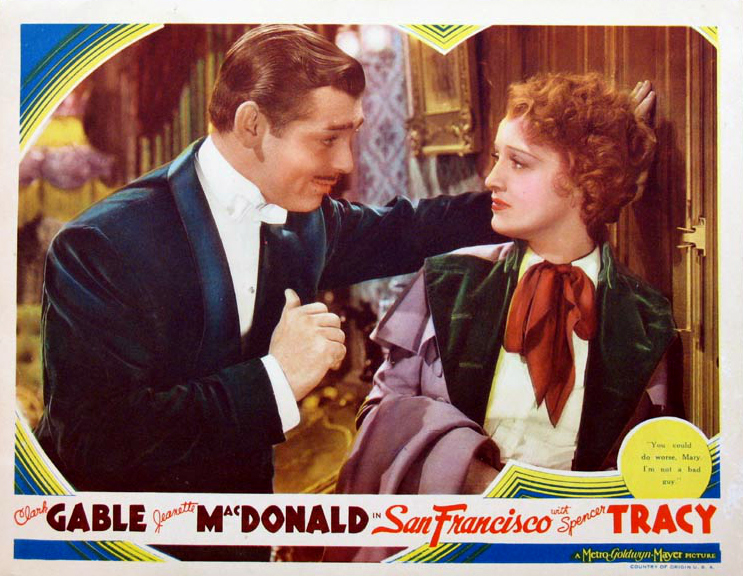
Lobby card

The earthquake montage sequence was created by Slavko Vorkapich, but the montage of effects was credited to Vorkapich's collaborator and second unit director John Hoffman. The Barbary Coast barroom set was built on a special platform that rocked and shook to simulate the historic tremor (similar sets were built for the 1974 disaster film Earthquake for an office building, bar, and seismology institute).

Famous silent film directors D. W. Griffith and Erich von Stroheim worked on the film without credit. It's been a matter of controversy which scene Griffith directed, but his contribution was mainly for publicity purposes. Von Stroheim contributed to the screenplay.

There are two versions of the ending. The original release features a stylish montage of then-current (1936) scenes of a bustling San Francisco, including Market Street and the construction of the Golden Gate Bridge. When the film was re-released in 1948, it was thought these scenes were dated and the film fades out on a single long shot of the modern business district. However, the TV and 16mm versions of the film seen in the 1950s and 60s were struck from the original version which includes the montage. The current DVD and cable version features the shorter, 1948 version.

Gable and Tracy also made two other films together, Test Pilot and Boom Town, before Tracy eventually insisted on the same top billing clause in his MGM contract that Gable had enjoyed, effectively ending one of the American cinema's most famous screen teams.

Gable had played an extremely similar character also named "Blackie" two years earlier in the smash hit gangster epic Manhattan Melodrama, with William Powell and Myrna Loy.

== Music ==
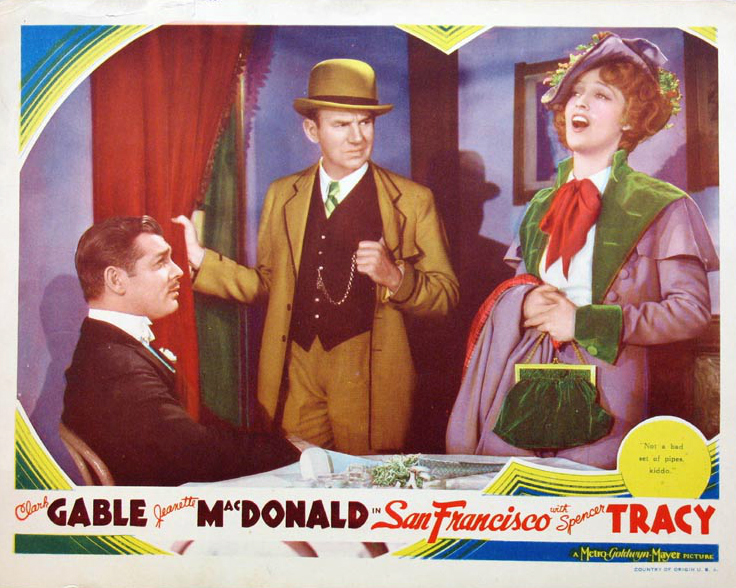
Lobby card with Clark Gable, Ted Healey and Jeanette MacDonald

The title song may be the best-remembered part of the film. It was composed by Bronisław Kaper and Walter Jurmann, with lyrics by Gus Kahn. It is sung by Jeanette MacDonald a half-dozen times in the film, and becomes an anthem for the survivors of the earthquake. It has now become a popular sentimental sing-along at public events such as the city's annual earthquake commemoration, as well as one of two official city songs; the other being "I Left My Heart in San Francisco". At San Francisco's historic Castro Theatre, the pre-film organ performance always ends with the song as the organ console is lowered down before the film starts.

Early in the film, the song "The Darktown Strutters Ball" can be heard; this is a historically inaccurate inclusion, since the song was written in 1917.

During the two operatic scenes in the film, MacDonald sang excerpts from Charles Gounod's Faust and Giuseppe Verdi's La traviata. Another song she sings is The Holy City.

== Box office ==
According to MGM records the film grossed a total – domestic and foreign – of $5,273,000: $2,868,000 in the US and Canada and $2,405,000 elsewhere. It made a profit of $2,237,000.

== Reception ==
Frank Nugent, writing in The New York Times, described San Francisco as "prodigally generous and completely satisfying," its musical sequences "woven gracefully into the script," and its earthquake "a shattering spectacle, one of the truly great cinematic illusions; a monstrous, hideous, thrilling débâcle."

=== Academy Awards ===
The film won one Academy Award and was nominated for five more.

Award	Result	Winner
Outstanding Production	Nominated	MGM (John Emerson and Bernard H. Hyman); Winner was Hunt Stromberg (MGM) - The Great Ziegfeld
Best Director	Nominated	W. S. Van Dyke; Winner was Frank Capra - Mr. Deeds Goes to Town
Best Actor	Nominated	Spencer Tracy; Winner was Paul Muni - The Story of Louis Pasteur
Best Writing (Original Story)	Nominated	Robert Hopkins; Winner was Pierre Collings and Sheridan Gibney - The Story of Louis Pasteur
Best Assistant Director	Nominated	Joseph M. Newman; Winner was Jack Sullivan - The Charge of the Light Brigade
Best Sound Recording	Won	Douglas Shearer

=== Other awards ===
Year	Award	Result	Category	Recipient
1936	Photoplay Awards	Won	Medal of Honor	John Emerson and Bernard H. Hyman
