= 9th Academy Awards =

- Date: March 4, 1937
- Site: Biltmore Hotel
- Hosted by: George Jessel

Highlights
- Best Picture: The Great Ziegfeld
- Most awards: Anthony Adverse (4)
- Most nominations: Anthony Adverse, Dodsworth and The Great Ziegfeld (7)

The 9th Academy Awards were held on March 4, 1937, at the Biltmore Hotel in Los Angeles, California to honor films released in 1936. They were hosted by George Jessel, with music by the Victor Young Orchestra, with Spike Jones on drums. This year marked the introduction of the Best Supporting Actor and Best Supporting Actress categories, and was the first year that the awards for directing and acting were fixed at five nominees per category.

Jessel assigned the wrong awards to the right winners of the newly-introduced supporting categories. The Great Ziegfeld was not a popular choice for Best Picture among members of the press, who felt that voters had been brainwashed by its lush gaudiness; they also felt that Luise Rainer's win of Best Actress for her performance was unjustified due to the short length of her role in the film.

My Man Godfrey became the first film to receive nominations in all four acting categories, but did not win in any category. It is the only such film to not receive a nomination for Best Picture, and was the only one to lose all of its acting nominations until Sunset Boulevard at the 23rd Academy Awards and the only one to not win any of its Oscar nominations at all until American Hustle at the 86th. It was also the first of four films to receive four acting nominations without one for Best Picture, followed by I Remember Mama (1948), Othello (1965), and Doubt (2008).

== Winners and nominees ==
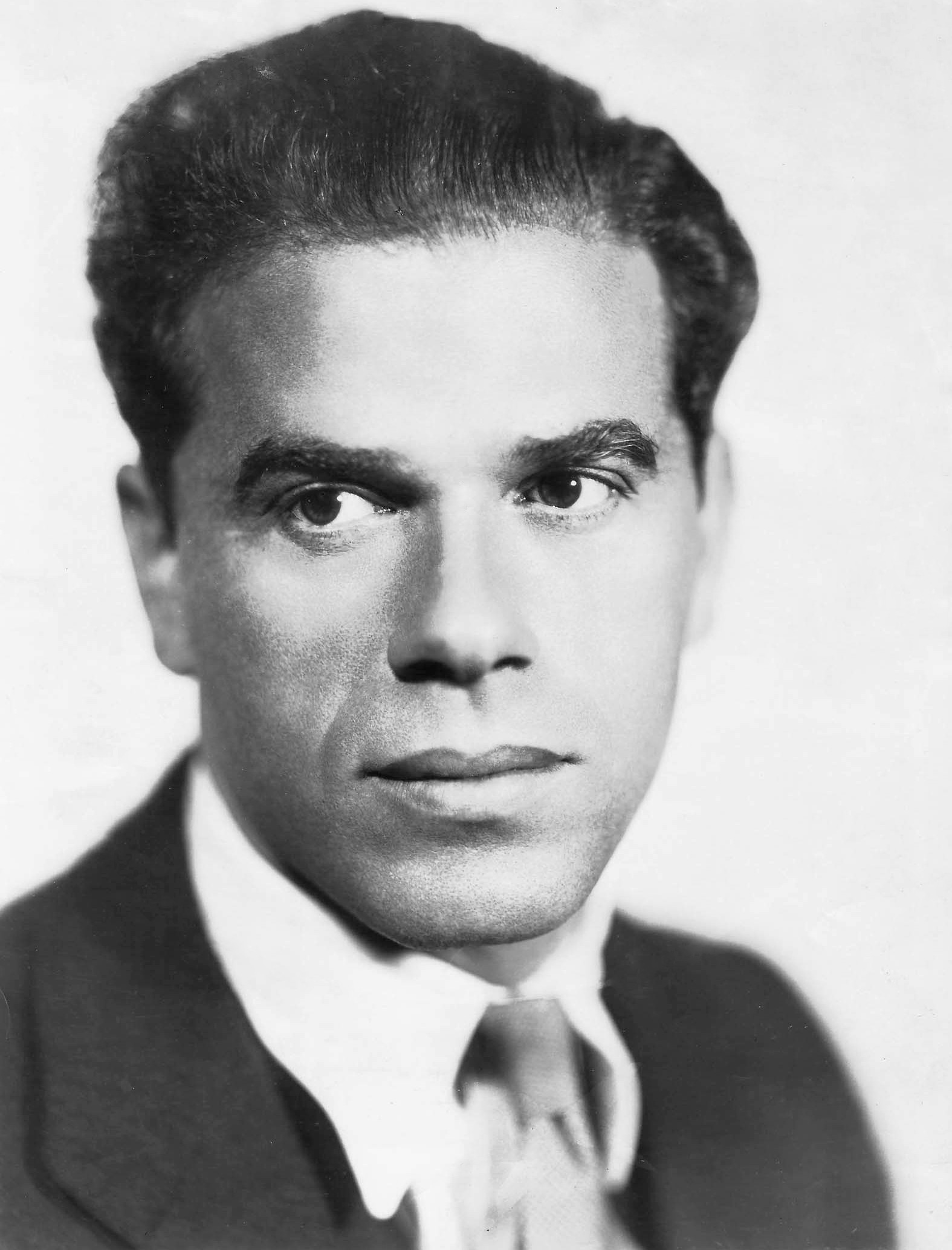
Frank Capra; Best Director winner

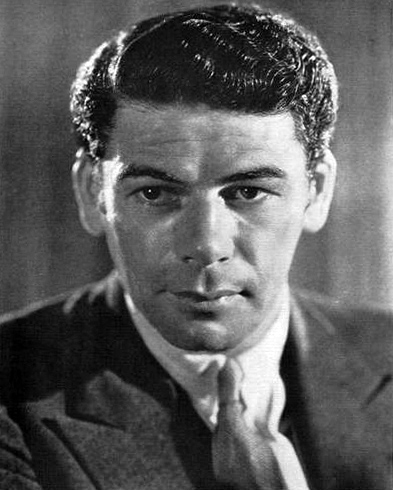
Paul Muni; Best Actor winner

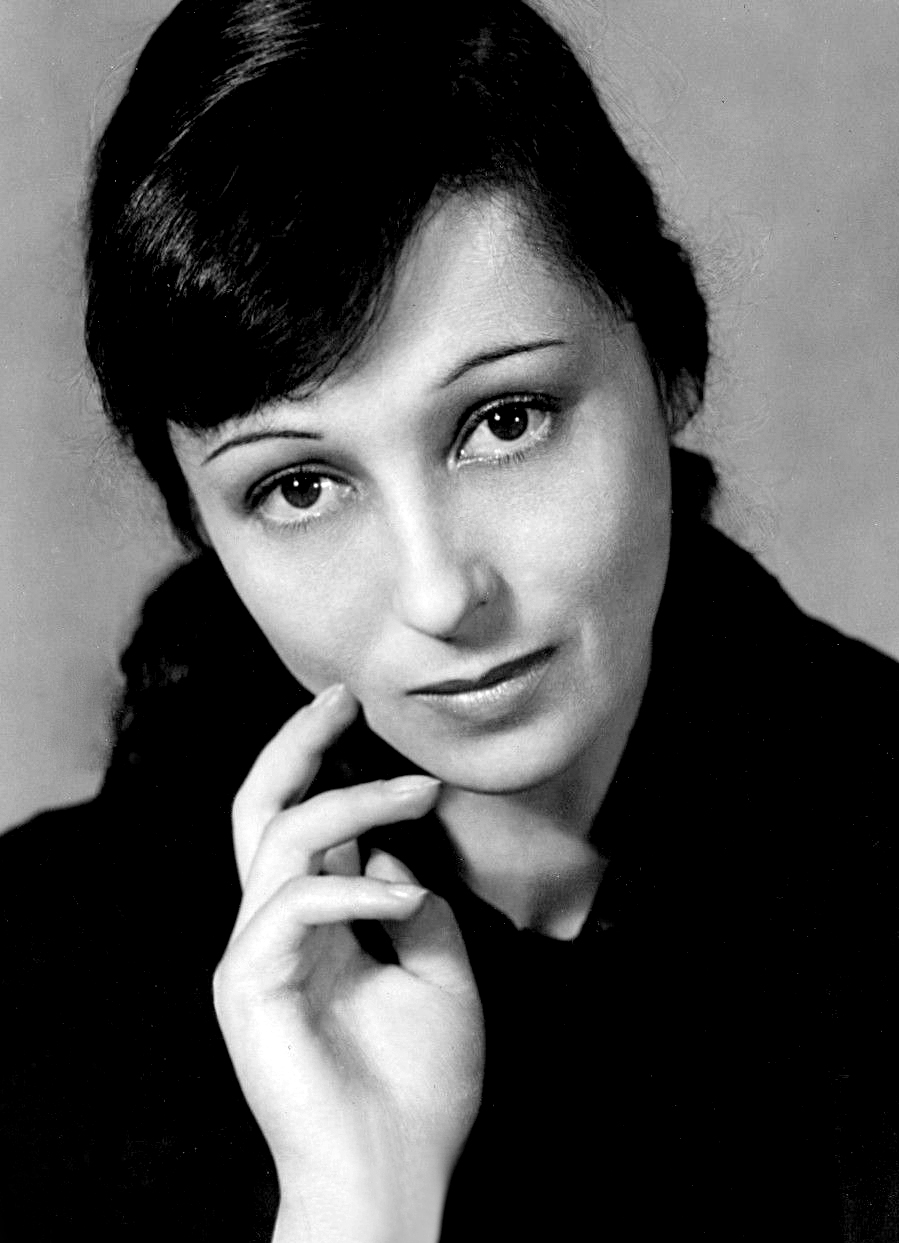
Luise Rainer; Best Actress winner

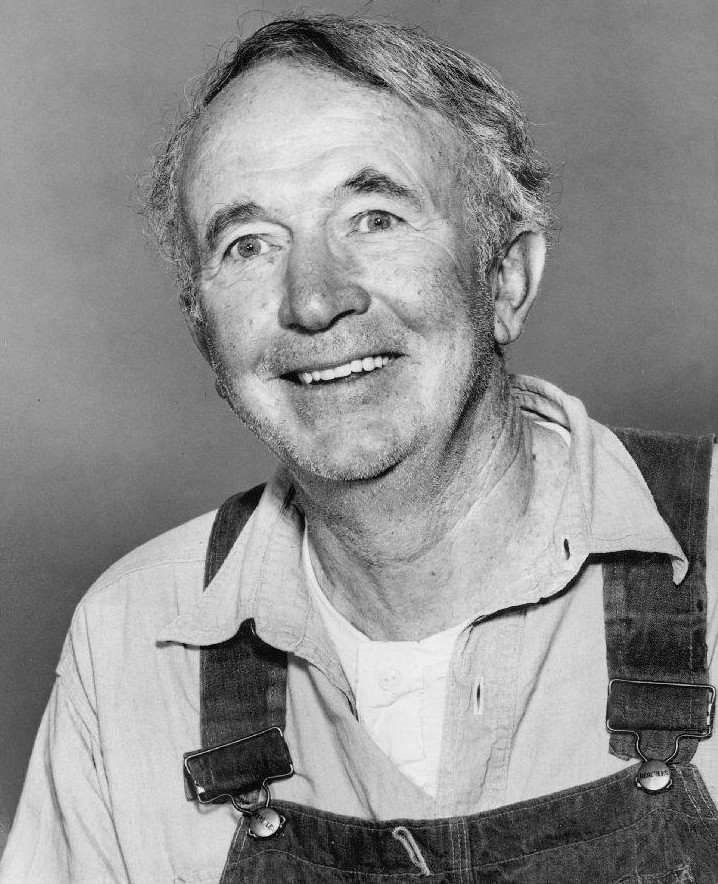
Walter Brennan; Best Supporting Actor winner

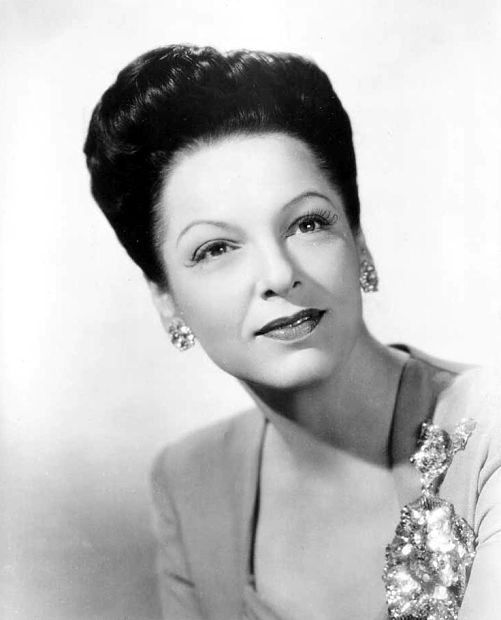
Gale Sondergaard; Best Supporting Actress winner

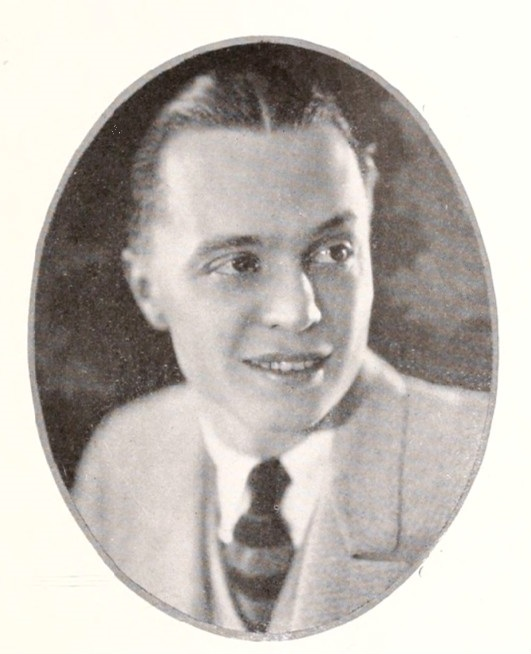
Pierre Collings; Best Original Story and Best Screenplay co-winner

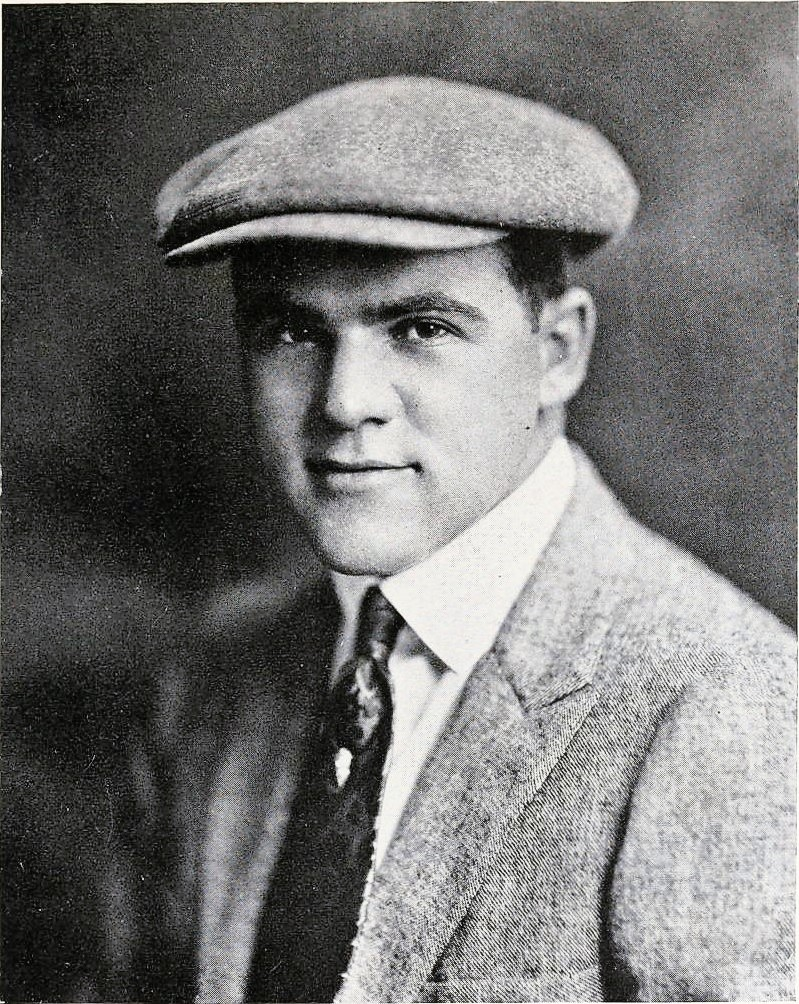
Hal Roach; Best Live Action Short Subject, One-Reel co-winner

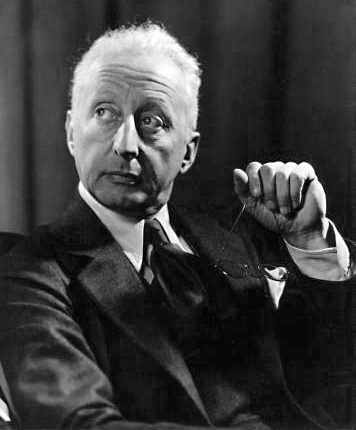
Jerome Kern; Best Song co-winner

=== Awards ===
Nominees were announced on February 7, 1937. Winners are listed first and highlighted in boldface.

**Outstanding Production**: **The Great Ziegfeld** **– Hunt Stromberg for Metro-Goldwyn-Mayer**; Anthony Adverse – Henry Blanke for Warner Bros.; Dodsworth – Samuel Goldwyn and Merritt Hulburd for Samuel Goldwyn Prod. and United Artists; Libeled Lady – Lawrence Weingarten for Metro-Goldwyn-Mayer; Mr. Deeds Goes to Town – Frank Capra for Columbia; Romeo and Juliet – Irving Thalberg for Metro-Goldwyn-Mayer; San Francisco – John Emerson and Bernard H. Hyman for Metro-Goldwyn-Mayer; The Story of Louis Pasteur – Henry Blanke for Warner Bros.; A Tale of Two Cities – David O. Selznick for Metro-Goldwyn-Mayer; Three Smart Girls – Joe Pasternak and Charles R. Rogers for Universal	**Best Directing**: **Frank Capra – Mr. Deeds Goes to Town**; William Wyler – Dodsworth; Robert Z. Leonard – The Great Ziegfeld; Gregory La Cava – My Man Godfrey; W. S. Van Dyke – San Francisco
**Best Actor**: **Paul Muni – The Story of Louis Pasteur as Louis Pasteur**; Gary Cooper – Mr. Deeds Goes to Town as Longfellow Deeds; Walter Huston – Dodsworth as Sam Dodsworth; William Powell – My Man Godfrey as Godfrey; Spencer Tracy – San Francisco as Father Tim Mullin	**Best Actress**: **Luise Rainer – The Great Ziegfeld as Anna Held**; Irene Dunne – Theodora Goes Wild as Theodora Lynn/"Caroline Adams"; Gladys George – Valiant Is the Word for Carrie as Carrie Snyder; Carole Lombard – My Man Godfrey as Irene Bullock; Norma Shearer – Romeo and Juliet as Juliet
**Best Actor in a Supporting Role**: **Walter Brennan – Come and Get It as Swan Bostrom**; Mischa Auer – My Man Godfrey as Carlo; Stuart Erwin – Pigskin Parade as Amos; Basil Rathbone – Romeo and Juliet as Tybalt; Akim Tamiroff – The General Died at Dawn as General Yang	**Best Actress in a Supporting Role**: **Gale Sondergaard – Anthony Adverse as Faith Paleologus**; Beulah Bondi – The Gorgeous Hussy as Rachel Jackson; Alice Brady – My Man Godfrey as Angelica Bullock; Bonita Granville – These Three as Mary Tilford; Maria Ouspenskaya – Dodsworth as Baroness Von Obersdorf
**Best Writing (Original Story)**: **The Story of Louis Pasteur – Pierre Collings and Sheridan Gibney**; Fury – Norman Krasna; The Great Ziegfeld – William Anthony McGuire; San Francisco – Robert Hopkins; Three Smart Girls – Adele Comandini	**Best Writing (Screenplay)**: **The Story of Louis Pasteur – Pierre Collings and Sheridan Gibney**; After the Thin Man – Frances Goodrich and Albert Hackett, based on a story by Dashiell Hammett; Dodsworth – Sidney Howard, based on the play by Howard and the novel by Sinclair Lewis; Mr. Deeds Goes to Town – Robert Riskin, based on the story "Opera Hat" by Clarence Budington Kelland; My Man Godfrey – Eric Hatch and Morris Ryskind, based on the story "1101 Park Avenue" by Hatch
**Best Short Subject (One-Reel)**: **Bored of Education – Hal Roach and MGM**; Moscow Moods – Paramount; Wanted – A Master – Pete Smith and MGM	**Best Short Subject (Two-Reel)**: **The Public Pays – MGM**; Double or Nothing – Warner Bros.; Dummy Ache – RKO Radio
**Best Short Subject (Color)**: **Give Me Liberty – Warner Bros.**; La Fiesta de Santa Barbara – Louis Lewyn and MGM; Popular Science J-6-2 – Paramount	**Best Short Subject (Cartoon)**: **The Country Cousin – Walt Disney Productions and United Artists**; The Old Mill Pond – Harman-Ising and MGM; Popeye the Sailor Meets Sindbad the Sailor – Fleischer Studios and Paramount
**Best Music (Scoring)**: **Anthony Adverse – Warner Bros. Studio Music Department**; The Charge of the Light Brigade – Warner Bros. Studio Music Department; The Garden of Allah – Selznick International Pictures Music Department; The General Died at Dawn – Paramount Studio Music Department; Winterset – RKO Radio Studio Music Department	**Best Music (Song)**: **"The Way You Look Tonight" from Swing Time – Music by Jerome Kern; Lyrics by Dorothy Fields**; "Did I Remember" from Suzy – Music by Walter Donaldson; Lyrics by Harold Adamson; "I've Got You Under My Skin" from Born to Dance – Music and Lyrics by Cole Porter; "A Melody From the Sky" from Trail of the Lonesome Pine – Music by Louis Alter; Lyrics by Sidney Mitchell; "Pennies from Heaven" from Pennies from Heaven – Music by Arthur Johnston; Lyrics by Johnny Burke; "When Did You Leave Heaven" from Sing, Baby, Sing – Music by Richard A. Whiting; Lyrics by Walter Bullock
**Best Sound Recording**: **San Francisco – Douglas Shearer**; Banjo on My Knee – Edmund H. Hansen; The Charge of the Light Brigade – Nathan Levinson; Dodsworth – Thomas T. Moulton; General Spanky – Elmer A. Raguse; Mr. Deeds Goes to Town – John P. Livadary; The Texas Rangers – Franklin Hansen; That Girl from Paris – John Aalberg; Three Smart Girls – Homer G. Tasker	**Best Dance Direction**: **The Great Ziegfeld – Seymour Felix**; Born to Dance – Dave Gould; Cain and Mabel – Bobby Connolly; Dancing Pirate – Russell Lewis; Gold Diggers of 1937 – Busby Berkeley; One in a Million – Jack Haskell; Swing Time – Hermes Pan
**Best Assistant Director**: **The Charge of the Light Brigade – Jack Sullivan**; Anthony Adverse – William Cannon; The Garden of Allah – Eric G. Stacey; The Last of the Mohicans – Clem Beauchamp; San Francisco – Joseph M. Newman	**Best Art Direction**: **Dodsworth – Richard Day**; Anthony Adverse – Anton Grot; The Great Ziegfeld – Cedric Gibbons, Eddie Imazu, and Edwin B. Willis; Lloyd's of London – William S. Darling; The Magnificent Brute – Albert S. D'Agostino and Jack Otterson; Romeo and Juliet – Cedric Gibbons, Fredric Hope, and Edwin B. Willis; Winterset – Perry Ferguson
**Best Cinematography**: **Anthony Adverse – Tony Gaudio**; The General Died at Dawn – Victor Milner; The Gorgeous Hussy – George J. Folsey	**Best Film Editing**: **Anthony Adverse – Ralph Dawson**; Come and Get It – Edward Curtiss; The Great Ziegfeld – William S. Gray; Lloyd's of London – Barbara McLean; A Tale of Two Cities – Conrad A. Nervig; Theodora Goes Wild – Otto Meyer

=== Special awards ===
- To The March of Time for its significance to motion pictures and for having revolutionized one of the most important branches of the industry - the newsreel.
- To W. Howard Greene and Harold Rosson for the color cinematography of the Selznick International Production, The Garden of Allah.

== Multiple nominations and awards ==
Films with multiple nominations
Nominations	Film
7	Anthony Adverse
7	Dodsworth
7	The Great Ziegfeld
6	My Man Godfrey
6	San Francisco
5	Mr. Deeds Goes to Town
4	Romeo and Juliet
4	The Story of Louis Pasteur
3	The Charge of the Light Brigade
3	The General Died at Dawn
3	Three Smart Girls
2	Born to Dance
2	Come and Get It
2	The Garden of Allah
2	The Gorgeous Hussy
2	Lloyd's of London
2	Swing Time
2	A Tale of Two Cities
2	Theodora Goes Wild
2	Winterset

Films with multiple awards
Awards	Film
4	Anthony Adverse
3	The Great Ziegfeld
3	The Story of Louis Pasteur

== See also ==
- 1936 in film
- List of films with all four Academy Award acting nominations
