= 1934 Academy Awards =

1934 Academy Awards may refer to:

- 6th Academy Awards, the Academy Awards ceremony that took place in 1934
- 7th Academy Awards, the 1935 ceremony honoring the best in film for 1934
