= The Red-Haired Cupid =

1918 film

- Directed by: Clifford Smith
- Written by: Henry Wallace Phillips
- Starring: Roy Stewart; Charles Dorian; Peggy Pearce
- Cinematography: Stephen Rounds
- Production company: Triangle Film Corporation
- Distributed by: Triangle Distributing
- Release date: June 2, 1918
- Running time: 50 minutes
- Country: United States
- Languages: Silent; English intertitles

The Red-Haired Cupid is a 1918 American silent Western comedy film directed by Clifford Smith and starring Roy Stewart, Charles Dorian and Peggy Pearce.

== Cast ==
- Roy Stewart as William 'Red' Saunders
- Charles Dorian as Kyle Lambert
- Peggy Pearce as Loys Andres
- Raymond Griffith as Albert Jones
- Aaron Edwards as 'Squint-Eye' Lucas
- Walter Perry as 'Wind-River' Smith

== Preservation ==
With no holdings located in archives, The Red-Haired Cupid is considered a lost film.

== Bibliography ==
- Goble, Alan. The Complete Index to Literary Sources in Film. Walter de Gruyter, 1999.
