= William Cannon (director) =

American film director

- Born: June 4, 1907; Shasta County, California, US.
- Died: November 14, 1990 (aged 83); Siskiyou County, California, U.S.
- Other name: William H. Cannon
- Occupation: Assistant director
- Years active: 1926–1967

William Cannon (June 4, 1907 – November 14, 1990) was an American assistant director as well as a director. He was nominated for an Oscar in the dead category of Best Assistant Director at the 9th Academy Awards for the film Anthony Adverse

== Selected filmography ==
- Thirty Seconds Over Tokyo (1944)
- The Wizard of Oz (1939)
- Anthony Adverse (1936)
- The Honeymoon Express (1926)
