= Dewey Starkey =

American film director

- Born: 9 May 1898; Ohio
- Died: 3 September 1974 (aged 76); Orange County, California
- Occupation: Film director
- Years active: 1930 - 1944

Dewey Starkey (May 9, 1898 – September 3, 1974) was an American assistant director. He worked on 41 films between 1930 and 1944. He won an Academy Award in 1933 for Best Assistant Director. He was born in Ohio and died in Orange County, California.
