= William Tummel =

American film director

- Born: March 5, 1892; Kansas City, Missouri
- Died: November 16, 1977 (aged 85); Los Angeles, California
- Occupation: Film director
- Years active: 1925 – 1947

William Tummel (March 5, 1892 – November 16, 1977) was an American assistant director. He worked on 59 films between 1925 and 1947. He won an Academy Award in 1933 for Best Assistant Director. He was born in Kansas City, Missouri and died in Los Angeles, California.

== Selected filmography ==
- Siberia (1926)
