= Sid Brod =

American film director

- Born: Sidney Sanford Brod; December 13, 1899; New York, US
- Died: February 10, 1955 (aged 55); Los Angeles, California, US
- Occupations: assistant director, producer and screenwriter
- Years active: 1927-1954

Sidney Sanford Brod (December 13, 1899 – February 10, 1955) was an American assistant director, producer and screenwriter who was nominated during the 6th Academy Awards for the short lived Best Assistant Director category. He died in 1955 at the age of 55. He also was the production designer as well for a film and his last project was an associate producer for The Bing Crosby Show which was Bing Crosby's first TV special.

William Powell credited Sid Brod with introducing him to Carole Lombard in 1930, saying,“Here is the girl who is going to play opposite you.”

== Selected filmography ==
- Time to Love (1927) (assistant director)
- Mama Loves Papa (1933) (assistant director)
- This Is the Life (1935) (writer-adaptation)
- Straight from the Shoulder (1936) (associate producer)
- Knickerbocker Holiday (1944) (production manager)
