= Academy Award for Best Assistant Director =

The Academy Award for Best Assistant Director was awarded from 1933 through 1937. In the first year of this award, it referred to no specific film.

- 1933:
  - Charles Barton (Paramount) - winner
  - Scott Beal (Universal) - winner
  - Charles Dorian (M-G-M) - winner
  - Fred Fox (United Artists) - winner
  - Gordon Hollingshead (Warner Bros.) - winner
  - Dewey Starkey (RKO Radio) - winner
  - William Tummel (Fox) - winner
  - Al Alleborn (Warner Bros.) - nominee
  - Sid Brod (Paramount) - nominee
  - Orville O. Dull (M-G-M) - nominee
  - Percy Ikerd (Fox) - nominee
  - Arthur Jacobson (Paramount) - nominee
  - Edward Killy (RKO Radio) - nominee
  - Joseph A. McDonough (Universal) - nominee
  - William J. Reiter (Universal) - nominee
  - Frank X. Shaw (Warner Bros.) - nominee
  - Ben Silvey (UA) - nominee
  - John Waters (M-G-M) - nominee
- 1934: John Waters – Viva Villa!
  - Scott Beal – Imitation of Life
  - Cullen Tate – Cleopatra
- 1935: Clem Beauchamp and Paul Wing – The Lives of a Bengal Lancer
  - Joseph Newman – David Copperfield
  - Eric Stacey – Les Misérables
  - Sherry Shourds – A Midsummer Night's Dream (write in)
- 1936: Jack Sullivan – The Charge of the Light Brigade
  - Clem Beauchamp – The Last of the Mohicans
  - William Cannon – Anthony Adverse
  - Joseph Newman – San Francisco
  - Eric G. Stacey – The Garden of Allah
- 1937: Robert Webb – In Old Chicago
  - C. C. Coleman, Jr. – Lost Horizon
  - Russ Saunders – The Life of Emile Zola
  - Eric Stacey – A Star Is Born
  - Hal Walker – Souls at Sea

== See also ==
- List of Academy Award–nominated films
