= Fred Fox (director) =

English film director

- Born: 22 January 1884; Highworth, Swindon, Wiltshire, England
- Died: 1 December 1949 (aged 65); Los Angeles, California
- Occupations: Film director Actor
- Years active: 1928–1949

Fred Fox (22 January 1884 – 1 December 1949) was an English assistant director and film actor. He appeared in 12 films between 1943 and 1949. He won an Academy Award in 1933 for Best Assistant Director.

He was born in Highworth, Swindon, Wiltshire and died in Los Angeles, California from a heart attack.
