= Moscow Moods =

1936 film

- Directed by: Fred Waller
- Produced by: Adolph Zukor
- Starring: Yasha Bunchuk
- Cinematography: William O. Steiner
- Edited by: Leslie M. Roush
- Distributed by: Paramount Pictures
- Release date: 1936
- Country: United States
- Language: English

Moscow Moods is a 1936 American short film directed by Fred Waller. It was nominated for an Academy Award at the 9th Academy Awards in 1936 for Best Short Subject (One-Reel).

== Cast ==
- Yasha Bunchuk as Himself
