= Percy Ikerd =

American film director

- Born: Percy Arthur Ikerd
- Other name: Perc Ikerd
- Occupations: Production manager, assistant director
- Years active: 1931-1955

Percy Ikerd was an American production manager and an assistant director who was nominated during the 6th Academy Awards for the short lived Best Assistant Director category.

== Selected filmography ==
- A Bullet Is Waiting (1954)
- The Moonlighter (1953)
- The Raiders (1952)
