= 6th Academy Awards =

- Date: March 16, 1934
- Site: The Ambassador Hotel
- Hosted by: Will Rogers

Highlights
- Best Picture: Cavalcade
- Most awards: Cavalcade (3)
- Most nominations: Cavalcade, A Farewell to Arms and Lady for a Day (4)

The 6th Academy Awards were held on March 16, 1934, to honor films released between August 1, 1932, and December 31, 1933, at The Ambassador Hotel in Los Angeles, California. They were hosted by Will Rogers, who also presented the awards.

When Rogers presented Best Director, he opened the envelope and simply announced, "Come up and get it, Frank!" Frank Capra, certain he was the winner, ran to the podium to collect the Oscar, only to discover Rogers had meant Frank Lloyd, who had won for Cavalcade. Rogers then called the third nominee, George Cukor, to join the two Franks on stage. After this, he summoned two of the Best Actress nominees—Diana Wynyard and May Robson—to the stage. Although they both thought they won in a tie, Rogers thanked them for their performances before announcing the actual winner: Katharine Hepburn.

A change in the eligibility rules resulted in the longest time frame for which films could be nominated: the seventeen months from August 1, 1932, to December 31, 1933. After this, the eligibility period would coincide with the calendar year. This resulted in the only time no ceremony was held in a calendar year (1933).

This was the last time that no film had more than four nominations, as well as the only year in Academy history in which no film other than the Best Picture nominees received multiple nominations. Cavalcade became the fourth film to win Best Picture without a writing nomination, and the last until Hamlet (1948) at the 21st Academy Awards.

Walt Disney became the first person to win consecutive Academy Awards, winning Best Short Subject, Cartoon for The Three Little Pigs after having won the same award the previous year for Flowers and Trees.

This was the first time in the Academy's history that both of the major acting nominees were absent from the big night.

== Winners and nominees ==
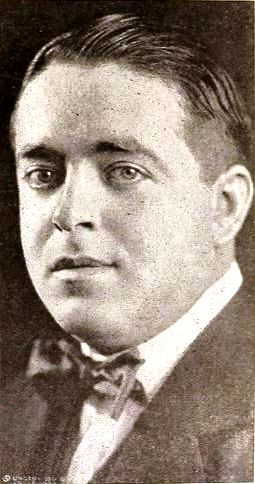
Winfield Sheehan, Best Picture winner (producer)

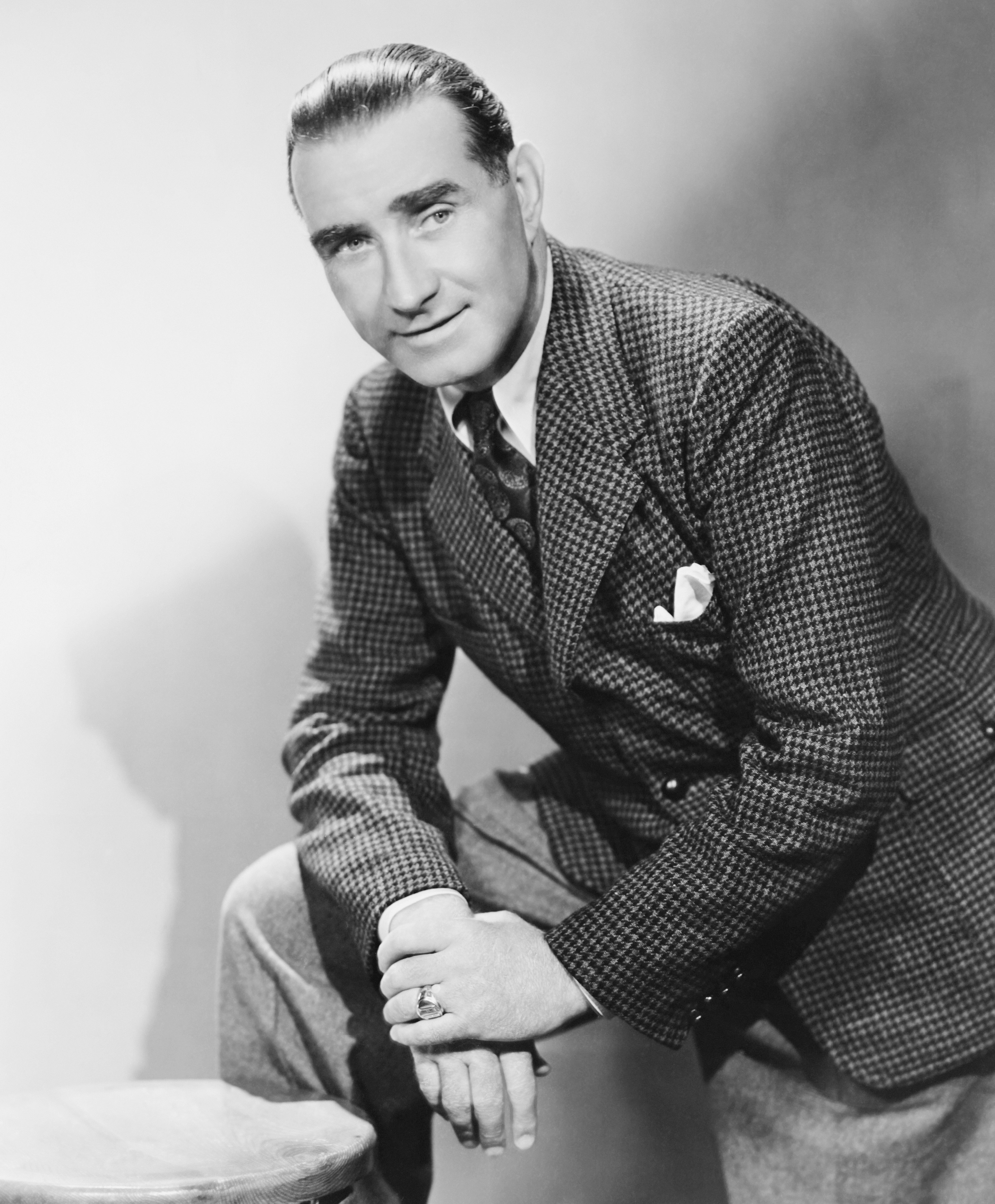
Frank Lloyd, Best Director winner

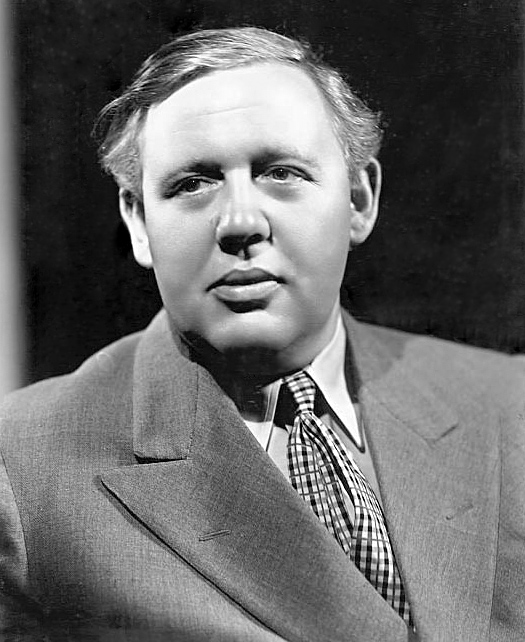
Charles Laughton, Best Actor winner

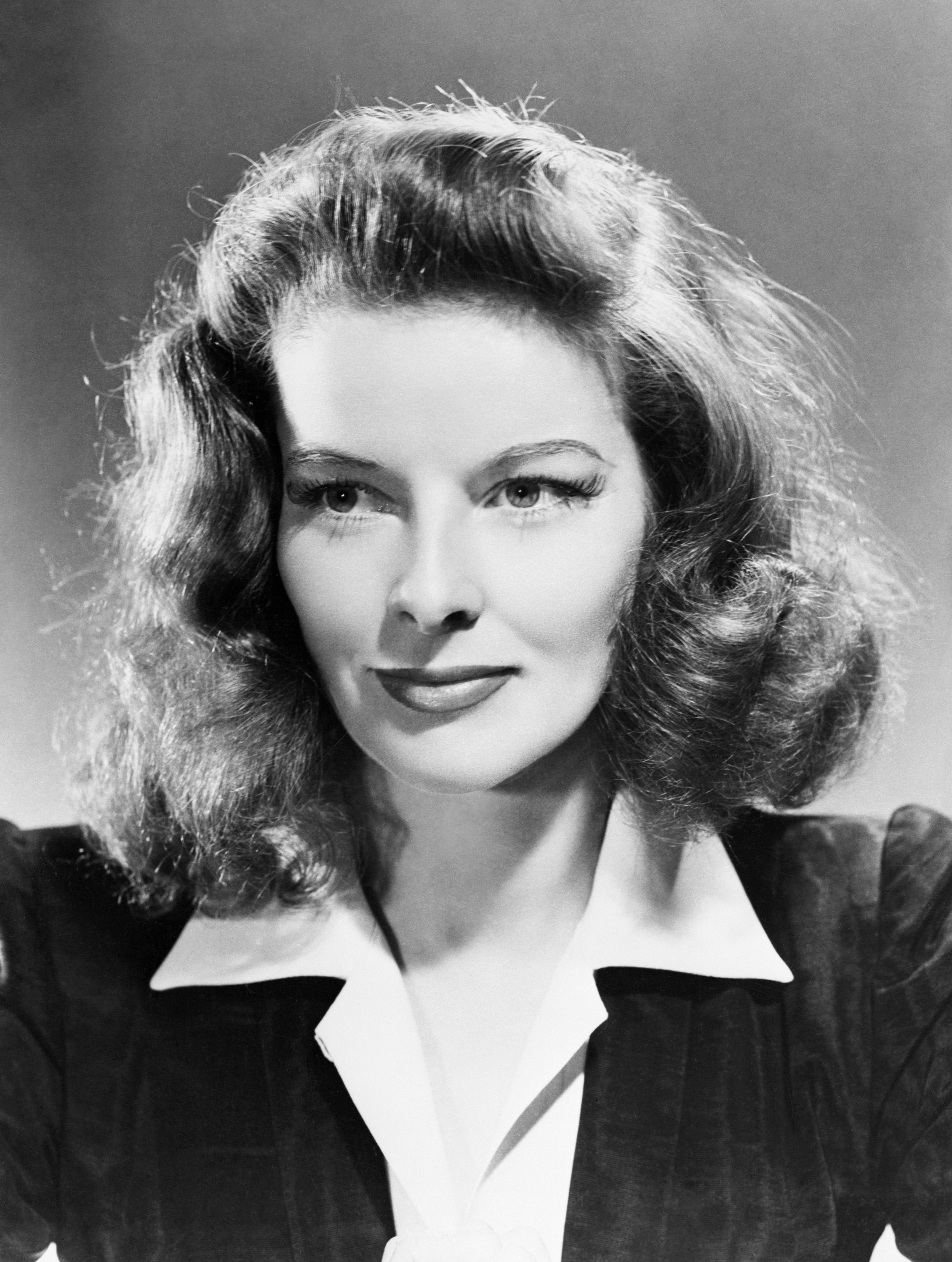
Katharine Hepburn, Best Actress winner

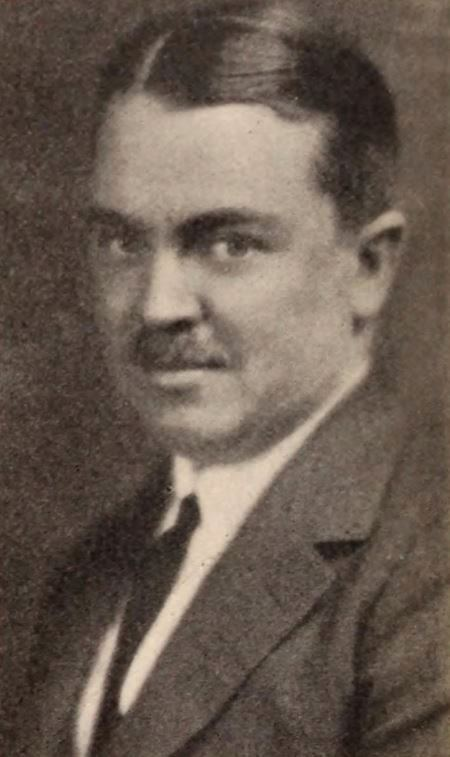
Victor Heerman, Best Adaptation co-winner

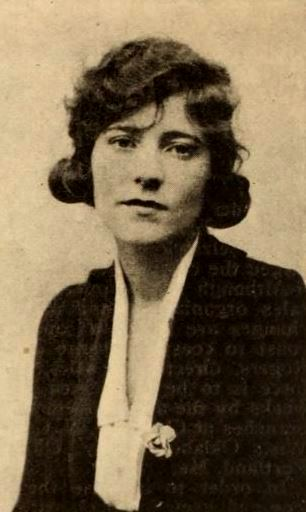
Sarah Y. Mason, Best Adaptation co-winner

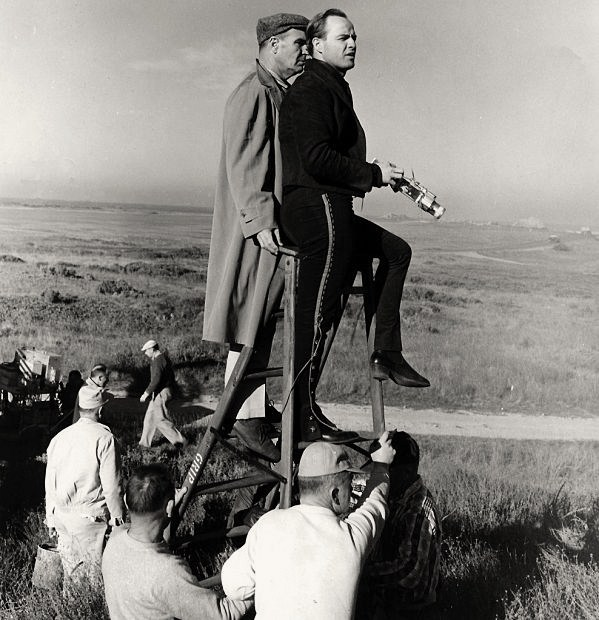
Charles Lang, Best Cinematography winner

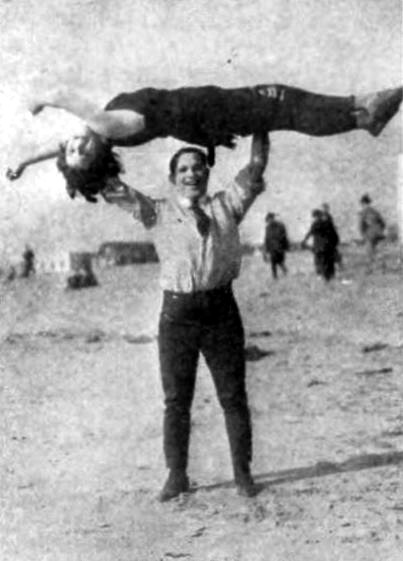
Joe Rock, Best Live Action Short Subject, Novelty winner

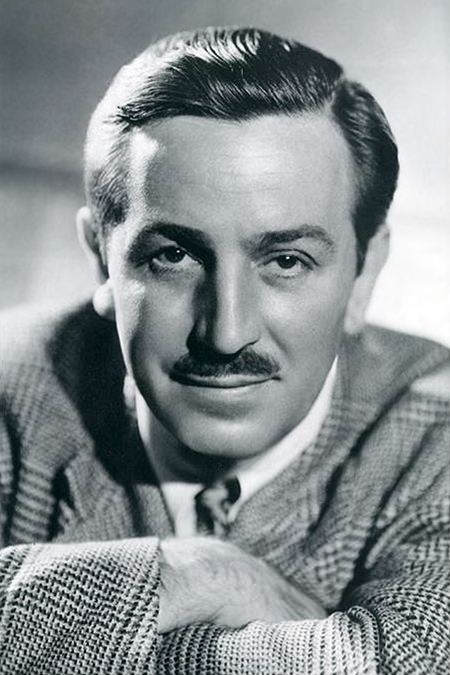
Walt Disney, Best Short Subject, Cartoon winner

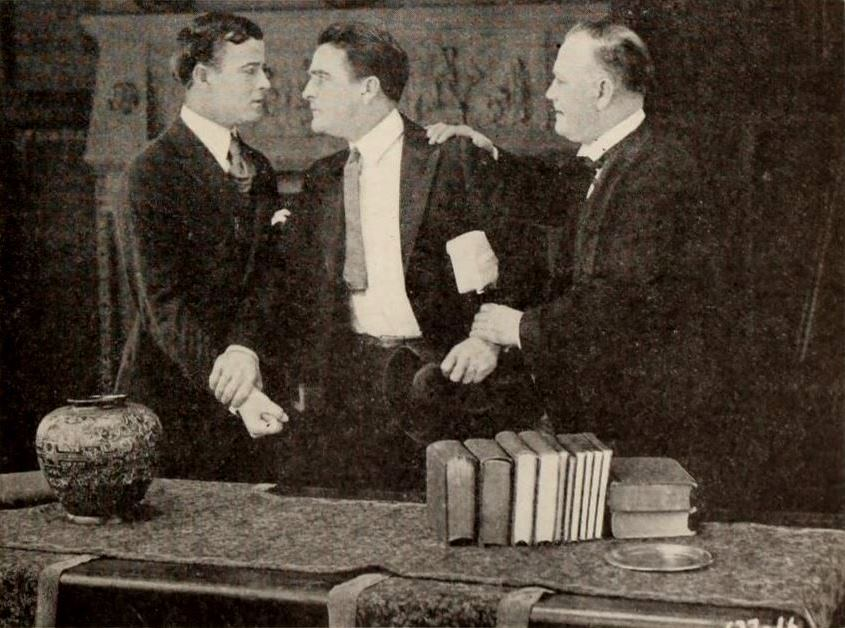
Charles Dorian, Best Assistant Director co-winner

Nominees were announced on February 26, 1934. Winners are listed first and highlighted in boldface.

**Outstanding Production**: **Cavalcade** **– Winfield Sheehan for Fox Film Co.**; 42nd Street – Darryl F. Zanuck for Warner Bros.; A Farewell to Arms – Adolph Zukor for Paramount Publix; I Am a Fugitive from a Chain Gang – Hal B. Wallis for Warner Bros.; Lady for a Day – Frank Capra for Columbia; Little Women – Merian C. Cooper and Kenneth Macgowan for RKO Pictures; The Private Life of Henry VIII – Alexander Korda for London Films; She Done Him Wrong – William LeBaron for Paramount Publix; Smilin' Through – Irving Thalberg for Metro-Goldwyn-Mayer; State Fair – Winfield Sheehan for Fox Film Co.	**Best Directing**: **Frank Lloyd – Cavalcade**; Frank Capra – Lady for a Day; George Cukor – Little Women
**Best Actor**: **Charles Laughton – The Private Life of Henry VIII as Henry VIII**; Leslie Howard – Berkeley Square as Peter Standish; Paul Muni – I Am a Fugitive from a Chain Gang as James Allen	**Best Actress**: **Katharine Hepburn – Morning Glory as Eva Lovelace**; May Robson – Lady for a Day as Apple Annie; Diana Wynyard – Cavalcade as Jane Marryot
**Best Writing (Original Story)**: **One Way Passage – Robert Lord**; The Prizefighter and the Lady – Frances Marion; Rasputin and the Empress – Charles MacArthur	**Best Writing (Adaptation)**: **Little Women – Victor Heerman and Sarah Y. Mason, based on the novel by Louisa May Alcott**; Lady for a Day – Robert Riskin, based on the story "Madame la Gimp" by Damon Runyon; State Fair – Paul Green and Sonya Levien, based on the novel by Phil Strong
**Best Short Subject (Comedy)**: **So This Is Harris – Louis Brock and RKO Pictures**; Mister Mugg – Warren Doane and Universal Studios; A Preferred List – Louis Brock and RKO Pictures	**Best Short Subject (Novelty)**: **Krakatoa – Joe Rock and Educational Pictures**; Menu – Pete Smith and MGM; The Sea – Educational Pictures
**Best Short Subject (Cartoon)**: **The Three Little Pigs – Walt Disney and United Artists**; Building a Building – Walt Disney and United Artists; The Merry Old Soul – Walter Lantz and Universal Studios	**Best Sound Recording**: **A Farewell to Arms – Franklin Hansen**; 42nd Street – Nathan Levinson; Gold Diggers of 1933 – Nathan Levinson; I Am a Fugitive from a Chain Gang – Nathan Levinson
**Best Assistant Director**: **Charles Barton – Paramount**; **Scott Beal – Universal**; **Charles Dorian – MGM**; **Fred Fox – United Artists**; **Gordon Hollingshead – Warner Bros.**; **Dewey Starkey – RKO**; **William Tummel – 20th Century Fox**; Al Alleborn – Warner Bros.; Sid Brod – Paramount; Orville O. Dull – MGM; Percy Ikerd – 20th Century Fox; Arthur Jacobson – Paramount; Edward Killy – RKO; Joseph A. McDonough – Universal; William J. Reiter – Universal; Frank X. Shaw – Warner Bros.; Ben Silvey – United Artists; John S. Waters – MGM	**Best Art Direction**: **Cavalcade – William S. Darling**; A Farewell to Arms – Hans Dreier and Roland Anderson; When Ladies Meet – Cedric Gibbons
**Best Cinematography**: **A Farewell to Arms – Charles Lang**; Reunion in Vienna – George J. Folsey; Sign of the Cross – Karl Struss

== Multiple nominations and awards ==
Films with multiple nominations
Nominations	Film
4	Cavalcade
4	A Farewell to Arms
4	Lady for a Day
3	I Am a Fugitive from a Chain Gang
3	Little Women
2	42nd Street
2	The Private Life of Henry VIII
2	State Fair

Films with multiple wins
Wins	Film
3	Cavalcade
2	A Farewell to Arms

== Scientific or Technical Awards ==
=== Class II Awards ===
- Electrical Research Products, Inc. (ERPI)
  - For work in sound reproduction.
- RCA Victor Company, Inc.
  - For work in sound reproduction. (Note: Class II Scientific or Technical award winners receive a plaque.)

=== Class III Awards ===
- Fox Film Corporation, Fred Jackman and Warner Brothers Pictures, and Sidney Sanders and RKO Radio Pictures.
  - For work in the technologies of cinematography and film projection. (Note: Class III Scientific or Technical award winners receive a citation.)

== See also ==
- 1932 in film
- 1933 in film
