= Charles Dorian =

Film director, actor

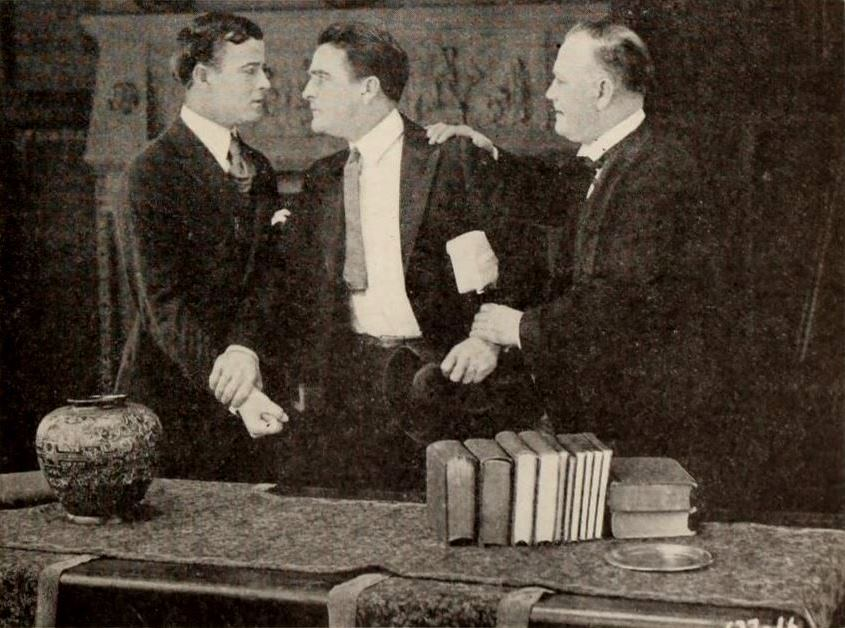
- Charles Dorian (at left) in Hell's End (1918)
- Born: June 27, 1891; Santa Monica, California
- Died: October 21, 1942 (aged 51); Albuquerque, New Mexico
- Occupations: Film director Actor
- Years active: 1915-1939

Charles Dorian (June 27, 1891 – October 21, 1942) was an American assistant director and film actor. He appeared in 26 films between 1915 and 1920. He won an Academy Award in 1933 for Best Assistant Director. He was born in Santa Monica, California and died in 1942 in Albuquerque, New Mexico from a heart attack.

== Selected filmography ==
- All Night (1918)
- Society for Sale (1918)
- The Red-Haired Cupid (1918)
