= Al Alleborn =

American film director

- Born: 1892
- Died: 1968

Al Alleborn (1892–1968) was a Studio executive and 2nd unit director in Hollywood film production.

Alleborn came to Hollywood initially as a stuntman. His first film was also one of the first Oscar nominees, 1928's The Patent Leather Kid. He received an Academy Award nomination in the short-lived category of Best Assistant Director in 1933. He was an uncredited unit manager on Max Reinhardt's 1935 version of A Midsummer Night's Dream, and headed up the unit production of The Adventures of Robin Hood three years later. Most of his career was based at Warner Brothers where he worked on such classics as Four Daughters (1938), High Sierra (1941) and Casablanca (1943).
