= A Star Is Born (1937 film) =

American drama film by William A. Wellman

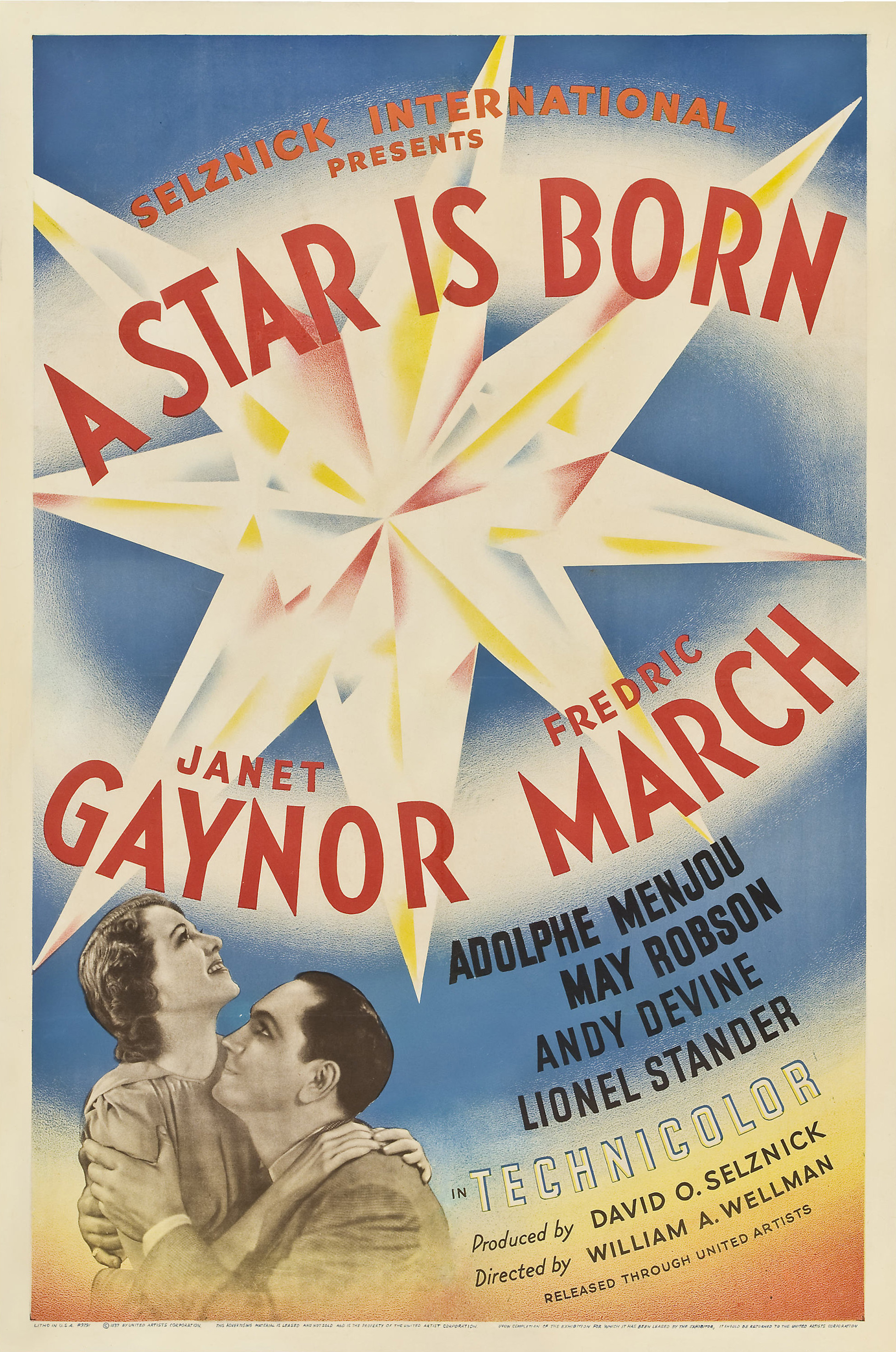
- Theatrical release poster
- Directed by: William A. Wellman
- Screenplay by: Dorothy Parker; Alan Campbell; Robert Carson
- Story by: William A. Wellman; Robert Carson
- Produced by: David O. Selznick
- Starring: Janet Gaynor; Fredric March
- Cinematography: W. Howard Greene
- Edited by: James E. Newcom; Anson Stevenson (uncredited)
- Music by: Max Steiner
- Color process: Technicolor
- Production company: Selznick International Pictures
- Distributed by: United Artists
- Release date: April 20, 1937 (Grauman's Chinese Theatre)
- Running time: 111 minutes
- Country: United States
- Language: English
- Budget: $1.2 million
- Box office: $2.37 million (worldwide rentals)

A Star Is Born is a 1937 American Technicolor drama film produced by David O. Selznick, directed by William A. Wellman from a script by Wellman, Robert Carson, Dorothy Parker, and Alan Campbell, and starring Janet Gaynor (in her only Technicolor film) as an aspiring Hollywood actress, and Fredric March (in his Technicolor debut) as a fading movie star who helps launch her career. The supporting cast features Adolphe Menjou, May Robson, Andy Devine, Lionel Stander, and Owen Moore. At the 10th Academy Awards, it became the very first color film to be nominated for the Academy Award for Best Picture.

The movie's plot is heavily based on a previous Hollywood production, What Price Hollywood?, released in 1932 though not as widely known. A Star Is Born was released by United Artists on April 20, 1937. This movie however would garner popularity and kickstart a legacy which led to it being remade three times: in 1954 (directed by George Cukor and starring Judy Garland and James Mason), in 1976 (directed by Frank Pierson and starring Barbra Streisand and Kris Kristofferson), and in 2018 (starring Lady Gaga and Bradley Cooper, who also directed). Unlike the original film, the three remakes are all movie musicals.

== Plot ==
A Star Is Born (1937)

Farm girl Esther Victoria Blodgett yearns to become a Hollywood actress. Although her aunt and father discourage such thoughts, Esther's grandmother gives Esther her savings to follow her dream. She leaves for Hollywood, where she attempts to land a job as an extra by signing up with Central Casting. However, due to so many others having had the same idea, the casting company has stopped accepting applications.

Esther is told that her chances of becoming a star are one in 100,000. She befriends a new resident at her boarding house, assistant director Danny McGuire, himself out of work. When they go together to a concert to celebrate Danny's employment, Esther has her first encounter with Norman Maine, an actor she admires greatly. He has been a major star for years, but his alcoholism has sent his career into a downward spiral.

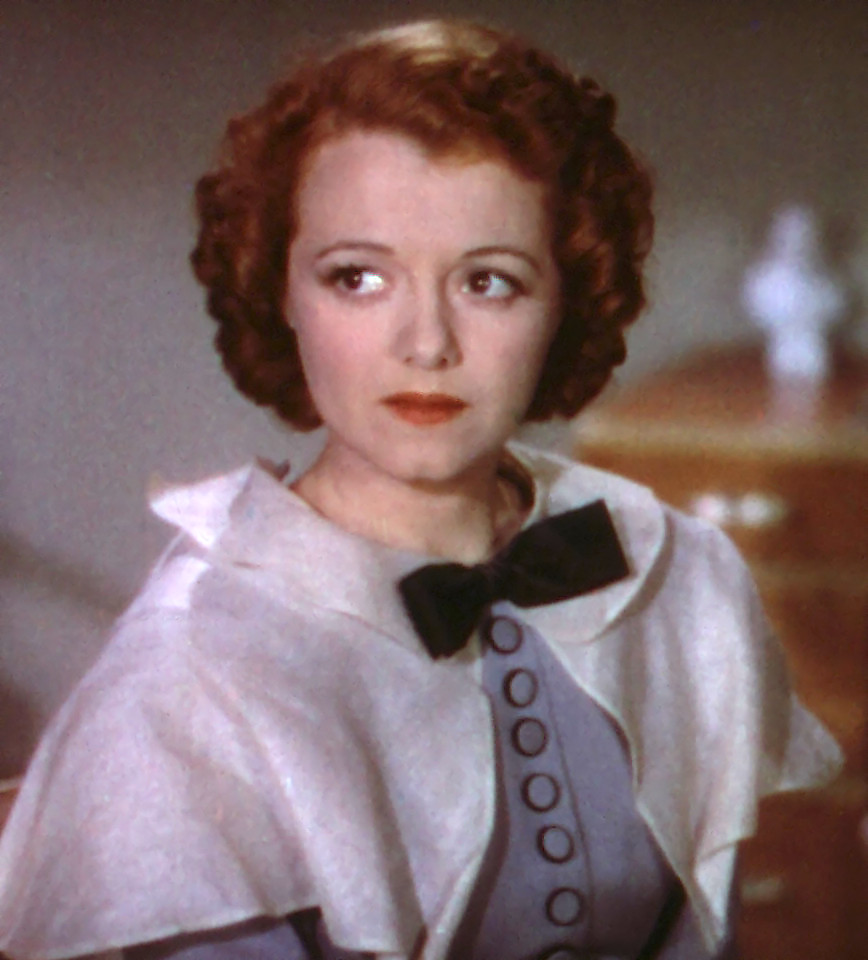
Janet Gaynor

Danny gets Esther a one-time waitressing job at a fancy Hollywood party. While serving hors d'œuvres, she catches Norman's eye. The next day, he gets his longtime producer and good friend, Oliver Niles, to give her a screen test. Impressed, he gives her a contract and a new name, "Vicki Lester". Esther practices her few lines for her first tiny role.

When the studio has trouble finding a female lead for Norman's current film, titled The Enchanted Hour, Norman persuades Oliver to cast Esther. The film makes her an overnight success, just as cinemagoers and exhibitors continue to lose interest in Norman.

Norman proposes to Esther, which she accepts when he promises to give up drinking. They elope without publicity, much to press agent Matt Libby's disgust, and enjoy a trailer-camping honeymoon in the mountains. When they return, Esther's popularity continues to skyrocket, and Norman realizes that his own career is over despite Oliver's attempts to help him.

Norman stays sober for a while, but his frustration over his situation finally pushes him over the edge, and he starts drinking again. When Esther wins the industry's top award (the Academy Award for Best Actress), he interrupts her acceptance speech by drunkenly demanding three awards for the worst acting of the year and accidentally slapping her when he dramatically swings his arms back.

A stay at a sanatorium seems to cure Norman's increasingly disruptive alcoholism, but a chance encounter with Libby allows the press agent to vent his long-concealed contempt. Norman goes on a four-day drinking binge, and he is arrested for drunk driving. In court, the judge sentences him to 90 days of incarceration, but Esther pleads with the judge to put Norman under her care. The judge, who is impressed with Esther's acting success, suspends Norman's sentence and puts his custody into Esther's hands. Esther decides to give up her career to devote herself to his rehabilitation. After Norman overhears her discussing her plan with Oliver, he drowns himself in the Pacific Ocean.

Shattered, Esther decides to quit and go home. Showing up soon afterward is her grandmother, who has heard that Esther is quitting. Her grandmother tells her of a letter Norman sent her when they got married. The letter stated how proud he was of Esther and how much he loved her.

Due to her grandmother's words and the reminder of Norman's deep love, Esther is convinced to stay in show business. At the premiere of her next film at Grauman's Chinese Theatre, when Esther is asked to say a few words into the microphone to her many fans listening across the world, she announces "Hello, everybody. This is Mrs. Norman Maine."

== Cast ==
- Janet Gaynor as Esther Blodgett / Vicki Lester
- Fredric March as Norman Maine
- Adolphe Menjou as Oliver Niles
- May Robson as Grandmother Lettie Blodgett
- Andy Devine as Daniel "Danny" McGuire
- Lionel Stander as Matt Libby
- Owen Moore as Casey Burke
- Peggy Wood as Miss Phillips
- Elizabeth Jenns as Anita Regis
- Edgar Kennedy as Pop Randall
- J. C. Nugent as Mr. Blodgett
- Guinn "Big Boy" Williams as posture coach
- Clara Blandick as Aunt Mattie (uncredited)
- Jonathan Hale as Judge George J. Parris (uncredited)
- Marshall Neilan as Bert (uncredited)
- Vince Barnett as Otto (uncredited)

== Production ==
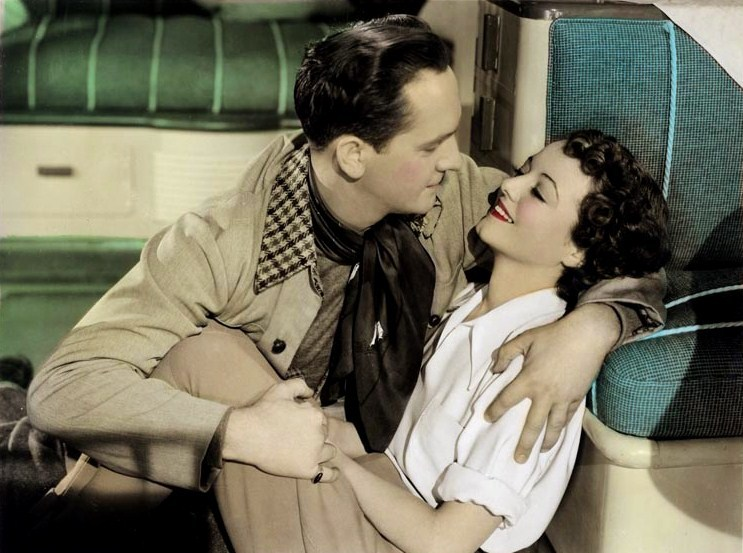
March and Gaynor

A Star Is Born was filmed from October 31 to December 28, 1936 with an estimated budget of $1,173,639, and premiered in Los Angeles on April 20, 1937, at Grauman's Chinese Theatre. The film's New York premiere took place two days later at Radio City Music Hall.

It is not known how much Dorothy Parker contributed to the finished script. When she first saw the film, Parker was proud of her contribution and boasted about both the script and the film, but in later life she believed that she had contributed nothing of significance. Early in their careers, Budd Schulberg (then a script reader for David O. Selznick) and Ring Lardner, Jr. (who was working in Selznick's publicity department) were assigned to write some additional dialogue for the film, a collaboration which produced Janet Gaynor's (and the film's) final words: "This is Mrs. Norman Maine." The line was used again in the 1954 remake starring Judy Garland and James Mason. George Cukor, who directed the remake, suggested adding the scene in the 1937 film in which Menjou offers the fading star a supporting role.

Janet Gaynor was given the first Oscar for Best Actress at the first Academy Awards ceremony on May 16, 1929. In the scene in which Vicky Lester wins an Oscar, it is Janet Gaynor's own Oscar she is holding. In a subsequent scene, the same Oscar is seen sitting on a shelf. Fredric March had won the Oscar for Best Actor (1931/32) on November 18, 1932, for the film Dr. Jekyll and Mr. Hyde (he tied with Wallace Beery for The Champ). Although Norman Maine states that he won an award statue, and the name "Oscar" never is mentioned on screen, it is, presumably, an Oscar. Unlike Janet Gaynor, however, Fredric March's Oscar is never seen.

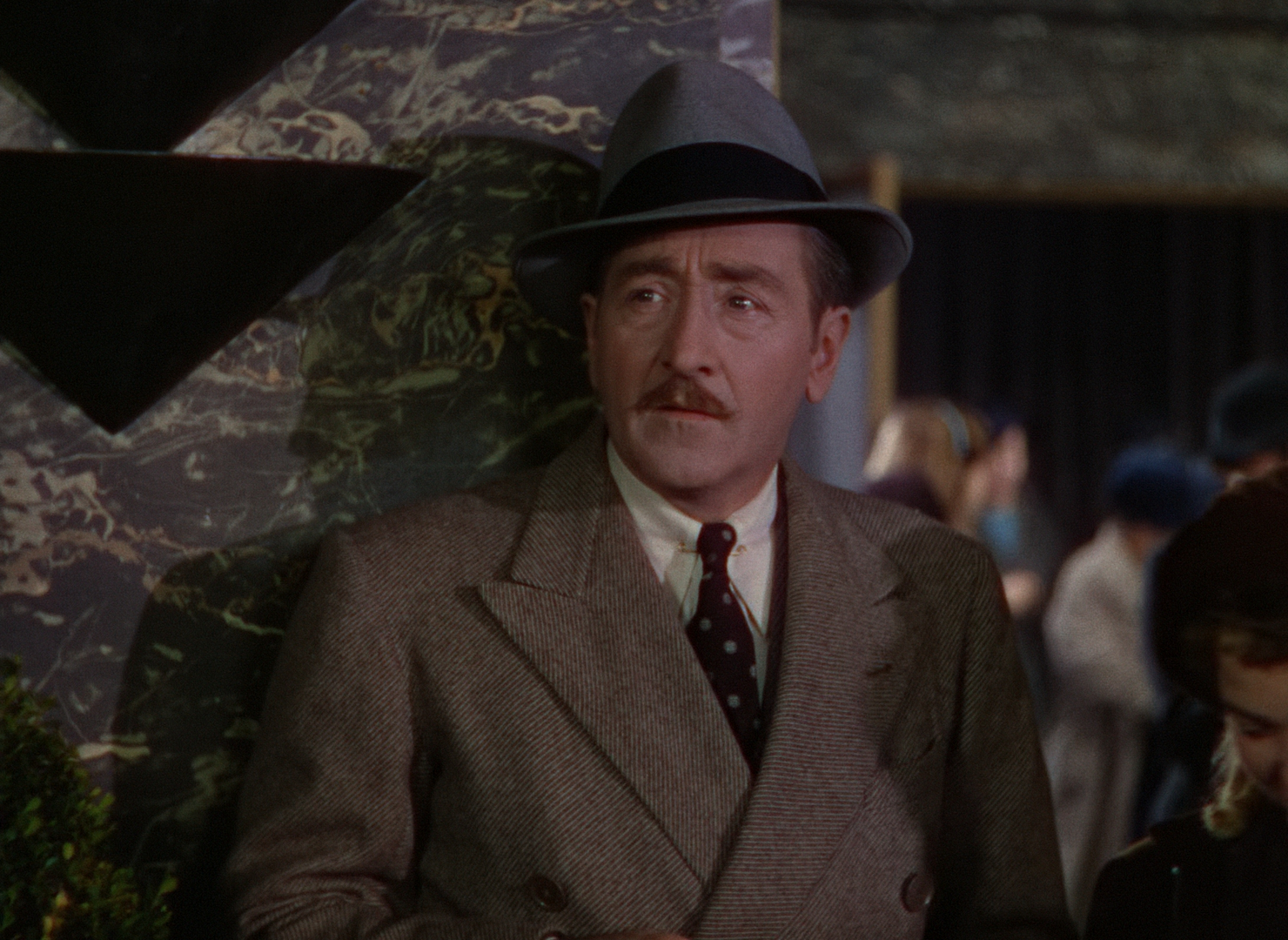
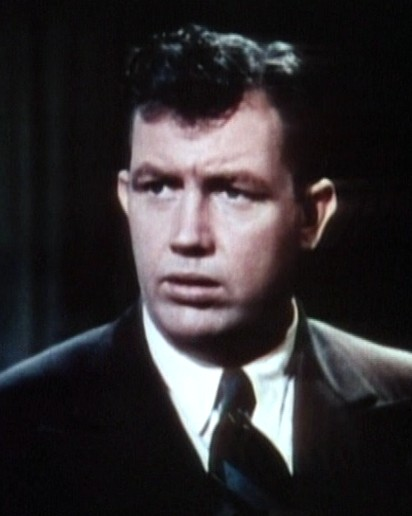
Adolphe Menjou (left) and Andy Devine (right); both pictures from the film's trailer

== Background ==
Some film historians believe that the marriage of Barbara Stanwyck and Frank Fay was the film's real-life inspiration. John Bowers has also been identified as the inspiration for the Norman Maine character and the dramatic suicide-by-drowning scene near the end of the film (Bowers drowned in November 1936). The film contains several inside jokes, including Gaynor's brief imitations of Greta Garbo, Katharine Hepburn, and Mae West; the "Crawford Smear", referring to Joan Crawford's lipstick; and the revelation that the glamorous Norman Maine's real last name is Hinkle. (Henkel was the real last name of silent film star Agnes Ayres, and not far removed from Fredric March's real last name, Bickel). Charlie Chaplin used the name Hynkel to parody Adolf Hitler three years later in his film The Great Dictator.

This film also has many similarities to the earlier film What Price Hollywood? (1932), released by RKO Pictures. The 1932 film's original title was The Truth About Hollywood based on a story by Adela Rogers St. Johns. St. Johns loosely based her plot on the experiences of actress Colleen Moore and her husband, alcoholic producer John McCormick (1893–1961), and the life and death of director Tom Forman, who committed suicide following a nervous breakdown.

Four years after What Price Hollywood? was released, Selznick approached George Cukor and asked him to direct A Star Is Born. Cukor felt the plot was too similar to What Price Hollywood? so he declined. RKO executives considered filing a plagiarism suit against Selznick International Pictures because of the similarities in the story, but eventually chose not to take legal action. Cukor later directed the 1954 musical remake starring Judy Garland.

A common Hollywood myth about the film is that Lana Turner appeared as an extra in one of the scenes in the film. Turner often denied the myth over the years, mentioning that she was discovered several months after the picture had finished production.

== Soundtrack ==
The title theme "A Star Is Born" was recorded by Buddy Clark with the orchestra of Eddy Duchin. The lyrics were written by Dorothy Dick to the music of Max Steiner.

A new stereo recording of ten cues from the score was released in 1975 on a United Artists LP, with LeRoy Holmes conducting an uncredited orchestra. A bootleg CD (in mono) was issued in the 2000s in Europe, but as of 2025 this recording has not seen a legal, authorized release in a digital format.

In October 2025, the Brigham Young University Film Music Archive issued a CD of the original 1937 soundtrack, derived from the composer's personal acetate discs in the Max Steiner Collection at Brigham Young University. This issue featured both cues that were heard in the finished film, as well as those that were jettisoned at the behest of producer David O. Selznick.

== Reception ==
=== Critical reception ===
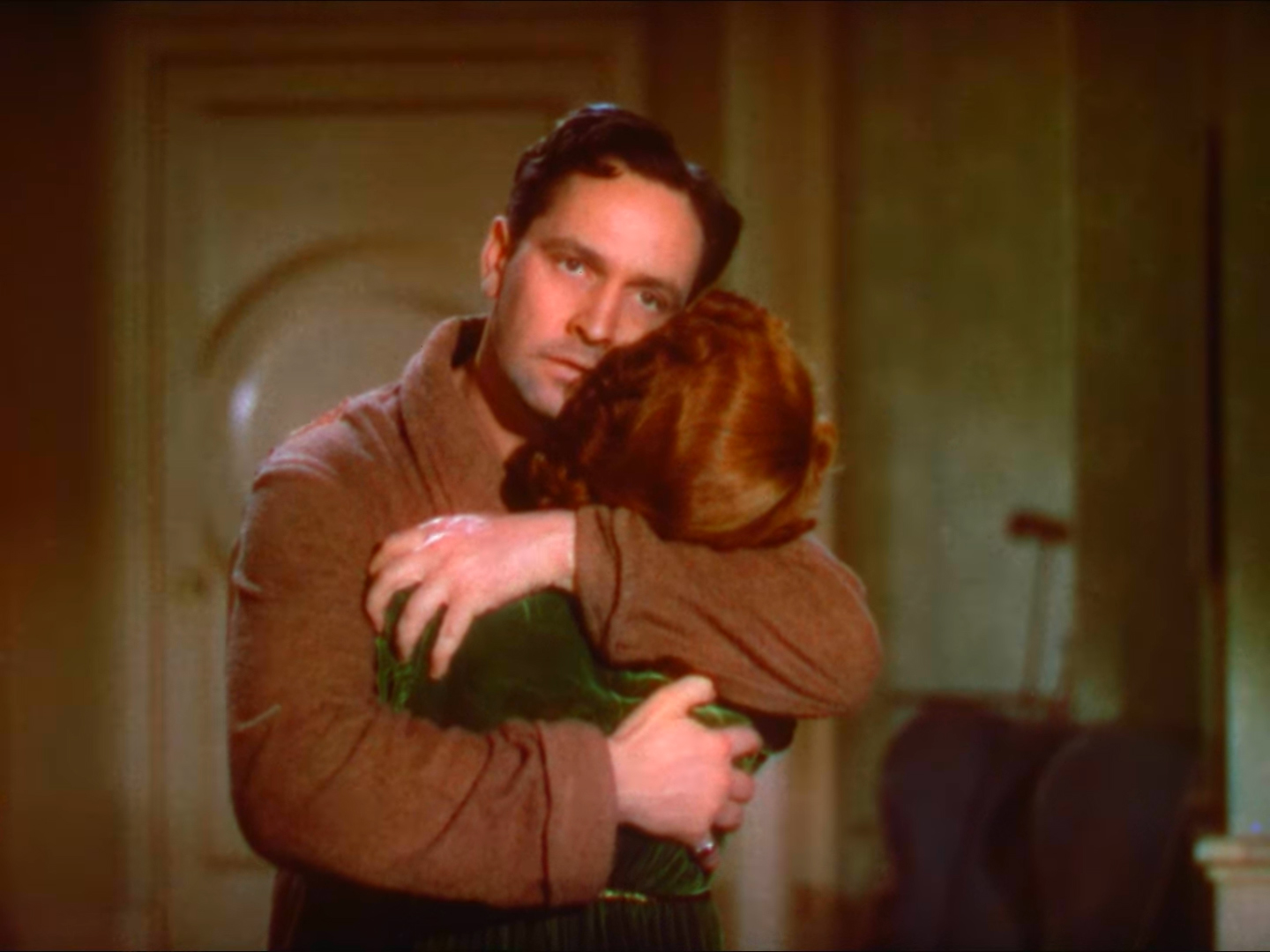
March in the trailer

Contemporary reviews were very positive. When it premiered at the Radio City Music Hall, Frank S. Nugent of The New York Times called the film "one of the year's best shows" as well as "good entertainment by any standards, including the artistic, and convincing proof that Hollywood need not travel to Ruritania for its plots; there is drama aplenty in its own backyard." Variety raved: "A smash which unquestionably will rate among the half dozen best of the season ... While the story is somewhat reminiscent of other behind-the-scene yarns, the manner of its telling makes it convincing and distinguished." Harrison's Reports called it "a powerful human interest drama" and "great entertainment." Film Daily said it was "superbly done in all departments," and John Mosher of The New Yorker called it "a pleasant movie" with "many nice touches." Review aggregation Rotten Tomatoes reports an approval rating of 100%, based on 23 reviews, with an average rating of 7.6/10.

=== Box office ===
The film earned $2.37 million in worldwide theater rentals, including $1.43 million domestically, and by the end of 1939 the film had generated a profit of $181,000. It was the first film to show that films about Hollywood could be successful.

=== Awards and nominations ===
Award	Category	Nominee(s)	Result	Ref.
Academy Awards	Outstanding Production	Selznick International Pictures	Nominated	
Academy Awards	Best Director	William A. Wellman	Nominated	
Academy Awards	Best Actor	Fredric March	Nominated	
Academy Awards	Best Actress	Janet Gaynor	Nominated	
Academy Awards	Best Original Story	William A. Wellman and Robert Carson	Won	
Academy Awards	Best Adaptation	Alan Campbell, Robert Carson, and Dorothy Parker	Nominated	
Academy Awards	Best Assistant Director	Eric Stacey	Nominated	
Academy Awards	Academy Honorary Award	W. Howard Greene	Won	
National Board of Review Awards	Top Ten Films		9th Place	
Venice International Film Festival	Best Foreign Film	William A. Wellman	Nominated	

== Adaptations to other media ==
At the time of the release of the film, a 15-minute transcription – a pre-recorded radio show issued on 16-inch disc – promoting the film's release was made. The narrated promotional radio show included sound clips from the film. The show was recorded and released through the World Broadcasting System, with disc matrix number H-1636-2.

The film was adapted as a radio play on the September 13, 1937, episode of Lux Radio Theater with Robert Montgomery and Janet Gaynor; the November 17, 1940, episode of The Screen Guild Theater starring Loretta Young and Burgess Meredith; the December 28, 1942, episode of Lux Radio Theater with Judy Garland and Walter Pidgeon; the June 29, 1946, episode of Academy Award Theater, starring Fredric March; the May 23, 1948, episode of the Ford Theatre; and the June 16, 1950, episode of Screen Director's Playhouse starring Fredric March.

== Remakes ==
A Star Is Born has been remade four times, in 1951 (a television adaptation) with Kathleen Crowley and Conrad Nagel; in 1954 with Judy Garland and James Mason; in 1976 with Barbra Streisand and Kris Kristofferson; and in 2018 with Lady Gaga and Bradley Cooper. Altogether, the four movies received 25 nominations for various Academy Awards, winning only three: 1937, Best Writing (original story); 1976, Best Music (original song); 2018, Best Achievement in Music Written for Motion Pictures (original song), and also an honorary award in 1937 (color photography).

The movie has also been remade (or adapted), albeit unofficially, in Hindi as Abhimaan (1973, starring Amitabh Bachchan and Jaya Bachchan) and Aashiqui 2 (2013, starring Aditya Roy Kapoor and Shraddha Kapoor), which in turn was remade in Telugu as Nee Jathaga Nenundali (2014). There was also a remake in Bengali as Bilambita Loy (1970), starring Uttam Kumar and Supriya Choudhury.

== Ownership and copyright status ==
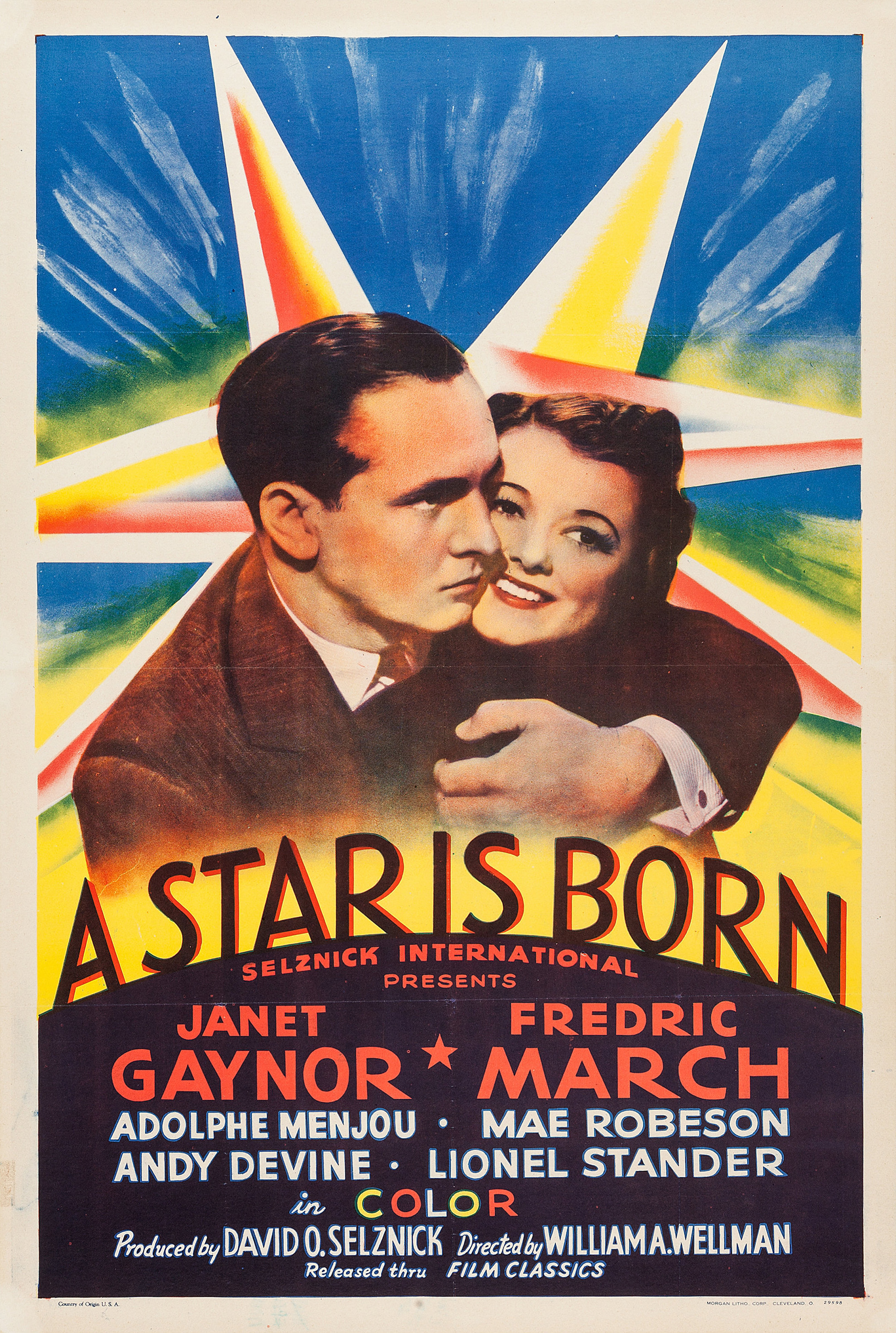
1945 re-release poster by Film Classics, Inc.

Selznick International Pictures dissolved leaving the film's rights to financier John Hay Whitney. Whitney then sold the film to Film Classics, Inc. in 1943. With declining rerun revenue, Film Classics placed the film up for sale with producer Edward L. Alperson with the intent to remake the film. Instead Alperson sold the film's copyright including film, story, screenplay, and score to Warner Bros. in 1953. Warner in 1954 issued the first remake. In 1965, the film entered the public domain in the United States because Warner did not renew its copyright registration in the 28th year after publication.

== Home media ==
The film was released on Blu-ray in the US by Kino Lorber Inc. in February 2012, featuring an edition authorized by the estate of David O. Selznick from the collection of George Eastman House.

A second Blu-ray from Warner Archive Collection was released in March 2022 with a exclusive 4K restoration from the aforementioned original 35mm nitrate Technicolor negative. That release contains the original trailer plus Merrie Melodies cartoon A Star Is Hatched (since Turner Entertainment currently owns the distribution rights for this bonus cartoon feature which was part of pre-August 1948 Warner Bros. Cartoons library under United Artists' shares such as Associated Artists Productions catalogue), and the live-action shorts Mal Hallett & His Orchestra, Taking the Count and Alibi Mark. In addition, two radio Lux Radio Theater broadcasts from 1937 and 1942 are included. Janet Gaynor reprised her role in the 1937 broadcast, and the 1942 broadcast featured Judy Garland who played Esther in the 1954 musical adaption.

== See also ==
- List of films with a 100% rating on Rotten Tomatoes
