= Jack Sullivan (film director) =

American film director

- Born: March 5, 1893; San Francisco, California, US
- Died: February 19, 1946 (aged 52); Los Angeles, California
- Occupation: Assistant director
- Years active: 1923–1946

Jack Sullivan (born March 5, 1893, in San Francisco, California, United States, died February 19, 1946) was an assistant director.

He won the Best Assistant Director award at the 9th Academy Awards for The Charge of the Light Brigade.

Sullivan is the great-uncle of Beth Sullivan, creator and executive producer of the TV series Dr. Quinn, Medicine Woman.
