= Joseph A. McDonough =

American film director

- Born: October 20, 1886; Portland, Maine USA
- Died: May 11, 1944 (aged 47); Hollywood, California, USA
- Occupation: assistant director
- Years active: 1917-1944

Joseph A. McDonough (October 20, 1896 in Portland, Maine – May 11, 1944 in Hollywood, California) was an assistant director in Hollywood. He often worked with director James Whale at Universal Studios and MGM.

Among the films he worked on with Whale at Universal were Frankenstein (1931), The Old Dark House (1932), The Invisible Man (1933), Bride of Frankenstein (1935) and the 1936 version of Show Boat. At MGM, McDonough worked with Whale on the unsuccessful Port of Seven Seas (1938), an American adaptation of the French Marcel Pagnol "Marius Trilogy".

He also worked on the W. C. Fields-Mae West classic comedy My Little Chickadee in 1940, and on the supernatural anthology film Flesh and Fantasy, in 1943. In 1934, he was nominated for an Oscar, not for any one film, but for his body of work, in the category of Best Assistant Director, a category that would be discontinued after 1937.
