= Eric G. Stacey =

Eric Glyn Stacey
- Born: 4 December 1903; London, England
- Died: 1 May 1969 (aged 65); Los Angeles, US
- Occupations: assistant director, production manager
- Spouse: Frances Stinette
- Children: Eric Stacey, Frances Eugenia Stacey

Eric G. Stacey (4 December 1903 – 11 May 1969) was a British assistant director and production manager. He was nominated three times for an Academy Award for Best Assistant Director for his work on the Darryl F. Zanuck production of Les Miserables (1935) and the David O. Selznick productions of The Garden of Allah (1936) and A Star Is Born (1937), the last year the Award was given to assistant directors.

== Biography ==
Born in Bayswater, London, England, Stacey was one of two sons the other being Gilbert Sydney Stacey (1896) both of Robert Stacey and Rosa née Dunn. Stacey attended Sutton Valence, Kent and St. Lawrence College. From 1922 to 1924, he worked as a clerk and assistant director with Artistic Films, Ltd. in London and had a short experience as a theatre manager at the Regent Theater, Brighton during 1925. In 1925, Stacey immigrated to the United States where he became an usher at the Publix Theaters. Shortly after that, he started his career in the cinema industry as an assistant director first and production manager later on. In 1941, Stacey married Frances Stinette, who had worked at the Hayes Office as a film censor enforcing the Motion Picture Production Code. The marriage endured until Stacey's death in 1969 in Los Angeles, California.

== Career ==
In 1926, Stacey found work with Paramount Famous Lasky Corporation in their Production Department. Moving to Hollywood in 1927, Stacey first worked as an extra but soon became a Property Master, working at Warner Brothers on the first talking picture, The Jazz Singer with Al Jolson.

By 1935, Stacey had become a respected Assistant Director. In 1936, Stacey began a relationship with David O. Selznick in which he would serve as First Assistant Director on all the feature films of Selznick International Pictures, including Little Lord Fauntleroy, (1936) The Garden of Allah, (1936), A Star is Born, (1937), The Adventures of Tom Sawyer, (1937), Made for Each Other, (1938), The Young in Heart, (1938) Gone with the Wind, (1938–1939), and Rebecca (1939). At a pre-production meeting for Gone with the Wind, "Assistant director Eric Stacey made the suggestion: why not assemble all the sets in a replica of 1864 Atlanta and send the whole thing up in flames?" Ridgeway Callow, second assistant director [GWTW], recalls that the day before shooting, "Flemming came onto the set and said to my boss Eric Stacey and myself, 'They tell me that you're supposed to be the best team in the picture business. But I'm going to put both of you in the hospital before this picture is over.'"

In 1940, Stacey became a Production Manager and was one of the founding members of the Screen Directors' Guild which would later become the Directors Guild of America. In 1940 Stacey worked on C.B. DeMille's Northwest Mounted Police, (1940) and later moved to Warner Brothers Studio. Some of the more notable Warner Brothers films Stacey worked on as a Production Manager were A Passage to Marseilles, (1943), Arsenic and Old Lace, (1944), The Big Sleep, (1945), Life With Father, (1946), Romance on the High Seas, (1947), The Fountainhead, (1948). From 1949 to 1954, Stacey served as Assistant to T.C. Wright, and from 1955 to 1956 became General Studio Manager, overseeing the productions of A Streetcar Named Desire, Rebel Without A Cause, East of Eden, and Giant.

On 5 July 1947 Stacey wrote to Studio Manager, T.C. Wright re. progress on the production of Romance in High C: "Mike's [Curtiz] progress on this show is phenomenal, due to great measure to the wonderful cameraman he has, [staff director of photography] Woody Bredell, who takes very little longer in Technicolor than most people do in Black and White. Which proves the point I have so long been telling you, that the Black and White and Technicolor cameramen routine we have been stuck with around here so long is a lot of nonsense; it makes everything take twice as long... Of course, Mike himself plans his work so well an knows exactly what he is going to do several days ahead of time, which most directors on this lot do not do. ... Picture 3 days ahead of schedule."

In late 1956, Stacey returned to the ranks of Unit Production Managers, working on Rodgers and Hammerstein's South Pacific, (1957), Rowland V. Lee's The Big Fisherman, (1959), Blake Edward's Breakfast at Tiffany's, (1960), George Stevens' The Greatest Story Ever Told, (1965), and Fantastic Voyage, (1966). I believe my uncle also was involved with the making of "The Honey Pot" with Rx Harrison (1965) Stacey died in 1969 while on location filming Noel Black's Run Shadow Run (later released as Cover Me Babe).

Well known directors Stacey worked with during his forty-year production career included: John Cromwell, Ryszard Bolesławski, Norman Taurog, Victor Fleming, Sam Wood, Alfred Hitchcock, Michael Curtiz, Frank Capra, Howard Hawks, Jean Negulesco, Raoul Walsh, Elia Kazan, George Cukor, Gordon Douglas, Nicholas Ray, George Stevens, Joshua Logan, Blake Edwards, Daniel Mann and Joseph L. Mankiewicz.
