= The Charge of the Light Brigade (1936 film) =

1936 film by Michael Curtiz

- Theatrical release poster
- Directed by: Michael Curtiz
- Written by: Michel Jacoby
- Screenplay by: Michel Jacoby; Rowland Leigh
- Based on: The Charge of the Light Brigade; 1854 poem by Alfred, Lord Tennyson
- Produced by: Jack L. Warner; Hal B. Wallis
- Starring: Errol Flynn; Olivia de Havilland
- Cinematography: Sol Polito A.S.C.
- Edited by: George Amy
- Music by: Max Steiner
- Production company: Warner Bros. Pictures
- Distributed by: Warner Bros. Pictures
- Release date: October 20, 1936 (USA)
- Running time: 115 minutes
- Country: United States
- Language: English
- Budget: $1,330,000 or $1,076,000
- Box office: $3,382,000

The Charge of the Light Brigade is a 1936 American historical adventure film from Warner Bros. Pictures, starring Errol Flynn and Olivia de Havilland. It was directed by Michael Curtiz and produced by Samuel Bischoff, with Hal B. Wallis as the executive producer. The film's screenplay is by Michael Jacoby and Rowland Leigh, from a story by Michael Jacoby, and based on the 1854 poem "The Charge of the Light Brigade" by Alfred, Lord Tennyson. The music score was composed by Max Steiner, his first for Warner Bros., and the cinematography was by Sol Polito. Scenes were shot at the following California locations: Lone Pine, Sherwood Lake, Lasky Mesa, Chatsworth, and Sonora. The Sierra Nevada mountains were used for the Khyber Pass scenes.

The filming of the charge sequence led to the death of 25 horses, which led to legislative action by the U.S. Congress and action by the ASPCA to prevent further cruelty by film directors and producers.

The film's screenplay is very loosely based on the famous Charge of the Light Brigade that occurred during the Crimean War (1853–1856). Additionally, the storyline includes an event similar to the Siege of Cawnpore during the Indian Rebellion of 1857.

This was the second of eight films in which Errol Flynn and Olivia de Havilland costar.

The supporting cast features Flynn look-alike Patric Knowles as Flynn's character's brother, David Niven, Nigel Bruce, Henry Stephenson, Donald Crisp, Robert Barrat, Spring Byington, J. Carrol Naish and E. E. Clive.

== Plot ==
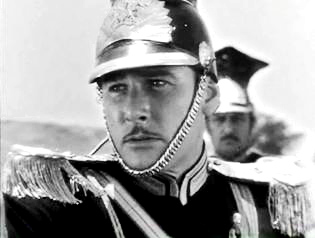
Errol Flynn in The Charge of the Light Brigade (1936)

In 1854, Captain Geoffrey Vickers and his brother, Captain Perry Vickers, are stationed in India, with the 27th Lancers of the British Army. It is during the period of East India Company dominance over the Indian subcontinent. Perry has secretly betrayed Geoffrey by stealing the love of his fiancée Elsa.

During an official visit to local tributary rajah, Surat Khan, Geoffrey saves the rajah's life while hunting, for which the rajah promises eternal gratitude. Later, Geoffrey Vickers (now a major) is stationed at the British garrison of (fictional) Chukoti, along with British military families, within the part the North-Western Frontier controlled by Surat Khan. A British miscalculation leads to premature withdrawal of troops to (fictional) Lohara, unnecessarily exposing Chukoti. Faced with an overwhelming siege, the British commander, Col. Campbell, surrenders Chukoti to Surat Khan, who then massacres the inhabitants, including the British families. Surat Khan spares Maj. Vickers and Elsa as they flee the slaughter and thus repays his debt to Geoffrey. Soon afterwards, Surat Khan has to flee from the vengeful British counter-attack and allies himself with Imperial Russia who had supported Surat Khan's attack on the British. The Russians in turn find themselves at war with the British in Crimea.

The love triangle and the quest for vengeance resolve at the Battle of Balaclava. Aware that Surat Khan is inspecting Russian positions opposite the 27th Lancers, Maj. Vickers secretly replaces written orders by Sir Charles Macefield to the commander of the Light Brigade, Sir Benjamin Warrenton, to withdraw from the Balaclava Heights. Vickers instead orders the famous suicidal attack so the lancers can avenge the Chukoti massacre. Before the charge, Maj. Vickers reminds troops of the Chukoti Massacre and directs their anger: "Our objective is Surat Khan!" Although the 27th Lancers and the other Light Cavalry units lose nearly all their 600 strength, they successfully breach Russian artillery positions. There, Vickers finds and kills Surat Khan with a lance, at the cost of his own life.

Later, it emerges that Maj. Vickers wrote a letter to Sir Charles Macefield explaining his actions, which he forced Perry to deliver under threat of court martial, sparing his brother almost certain death during the 27th's charge. After receiving Maj. Vickers' explanation of why he defied orders and the charge happened, Macefield takes responsibility and burns the letter to protect Vickers and to honor him for his conspicuous gallantry in avenging the Chukoti Massacre.

== Cast ==
- Errol Flynn as Major Geoffrey Vickers
- Olivia de Havilland as Elsa Campbell
- Patric Knowles as Captain Perry Vickers
- Henry Stephenson as Sir Charles Macefield
- Nigel Bruce as Sir Benjamin Warrenton
- Donald Crisp as Colonel Campbell
- David Niven as Captain Randall
- C. Henry Gordon as Surat Khan
- G. P. Huntley Jr. as Major Jowett
- Robert Barrat as Count Igor Volonoff
- Spring Byington as Lady Octavia Warrenton
- E. E. Clive as Sir Humphrey Harcourt
- J. Carrol Naish as Subahdar-Major Puran Singh
- Walter Holbrook as Cornet Barclay
- Princess Baigum as Prema's Mother
- Charles Sedgwick as Cornet Pearson
- Scotty Beckett as Prema Singh
- George Regas as Wazir
- Helen Sanborn as Mrs. Jowett
- Holmes Herbert as Gen. O'Neill (uncredited)

== Production ==
=== Development ===
The charge had been previously portrayed in a British film, The Jaws of Death (1930).

Warner Bros. was inspired to make the film after Lives of a Bengal Lancer (1935) had been released to great popularity, ushering in a series of British Empire adventure tales. Michel Jacoby had developed a story based on the famous charge but, although Warners bought Jacoby's script, the final script was closer to Lives of a Bengal Lancer.

An original working title for the film was The Charge of the 600.

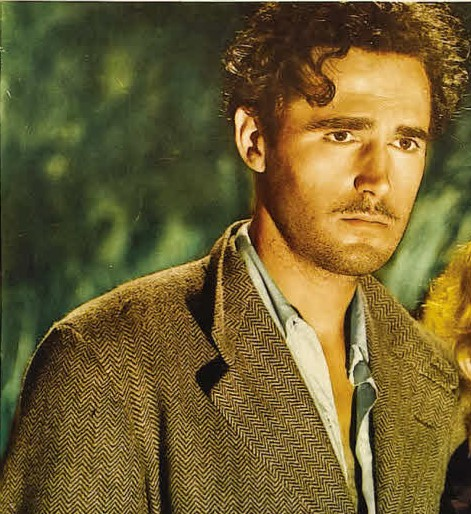
Patric Knowles portrayed Flynn's character's brother.

Warner Bros. wanted an all-British cast. Errol Flynn (Australian, but initially ballyhooed by the studio publicity department as Irish) had made such a strong impression in Captain Blood that he was removed from supporting Fredric March in Anthony Adverse to play the lead in Charge of the Light Brigade. Ian Hunter was connected to the film early on. Anita Louise was announced as the female lead.

Patric Knowles had just joined Warner Bros. at the recommendation of Irving Asher in London, the same man who recommended Errol Flynn. He was given the crucial supporting role of Flynn's brother, since Flynn and Knowles looked almost exactly alike at the time.

The film provides an early, important supporting role for David Niven.

Edward G. Robinson tested for the role as the lead villain Surat Khan. Basil Rathbone was also considered before C. Henry Gordon was finally cast.

=== Shooting ===
Principal photography began in April 1936.

During filming on location at Lone Pine California, the studio's camera unit helped put out a fire that started at a restaurant across the road from where the actors were staying.

Some of the location shooting was done in Mexico where there were fewer restrictions on harming animals during production.

=== The Charge sequence ===
The film comes to a climax at the Battle of Balaclava, subject of Lord Tennyson's poem. The lancers charge into the valley, braving the heavy Russian cannon fire, and many are killed. Text from Tennyson's poem is superimposed on screen, coupled with Max Steiner's musical score. Director Michael Curtiz, who did not have an excellent command of English, shouted "Bring on the empty horses," meaning the "riderless horses"; David Niven used this as the title of his second autobiographical memoir about the Golden Age of Hollywood.

The battlefield set was lined with tripwires to trip the charging cavalry horses. For the filming of this climax, 125 horses were tripped; of those, 25 were killed or put down afterward. Errol Flynn, an accomplished horseman, was outraged by the animal cruelty and by director Michael Curtiz's seeming indifference. He attacked Curtiz, but they were pulled apart before any serious damage was done. The film's charge sequence later forced the U.S. Congress to ensure the safety of animals in future motion pictures; the ASPCA followed suit and banned tripwires from all films. Unlike Flynn's other blockbusters, because of the number of horses killed during the charge sequence, the film was never re-released by Warner Bros. It would not be seen again until 1956, when the company sold the rights to it and other pre-1950 films to Associated Artists Productions, after which it subsequently premiered on television. This scene was later used in the music video for the hit song "The Trooper" by Iron Maiden which was famously banned by MTV.

== Stylized as a cenotaph in opening credits ==
"QUIS SUPERABIT
WHO SHALL EXCEL THEM
Dedication
To the officers and men
Of the Light Brigade who
Died victorious in a gallant
Charge at Balaklava for
Queen and Country
A.D. 1856"

"The world is indebted to Alfred,
Lord Tennyson, Poet Laureate to
Her Majesty, Queen Victoria of
Great Britain, for perpetuating
in an epic poem one of the most
distinguished events in history
conspicuous for sheer valor..."

== Disclaimer at the end of opening credits ==
"This production has its basis in history.
The historical basis, however, has been
fictionalized for the purposes of this picture
and the names of many characters, many
characters themselves, the story, incidents
and institutions, are fictitious. With the
exception of known historical characters,
whose actual names are herein used, no
identification with actual persons, living
or dead, is intended or should be inferred".

== Reception ==
=== Box Office ===
The film was a massive hit in Japan.

According to Warner Bros.' accounts, the film was the studio's most expensive and most popular film of 1936, earning $1,454,000 domestically and $1,928,000 in foreign markets.

=== Critical ===
Filmink magazine wrote that "If you think that story sounds silly, you'd be right and it doesn't come across any less so on screen" but thought the film was redeemed by Flynn and its action sequences.

== Awards ==
Jack Sullivan won the Academy Award for Best Assistant Director for his work on the film, and it was also nominated for the Academy Award for Sound (Nathan Levinson) and the Academy Award for Original Music Score.

== See also ==
- List of American films of 1936
