= Academy Award for Best Dance Direction =

Former Academy Award (1935–1937)

The Academy Award for Best Dance Direction was presented from 1935 to 1937, after which it was discontinued due to pressure from the directors' branch. It is the only category for which a Marx Brothers film received an Oscar nomination, for the dance number "All God's Chillun Got Rhythm" in A Day at the Races (1937).

== Winners and nominees ==
Year	Film(s)	Dance number(s)	Nominees
1935 (8th)
1935 (8th)	Broadway Melody of 1936; Folies Bergère de Paris	"I've Got a Feeling You're Fooling" "Straw Hat"	Dave Gould
1935 (8th)	All the King's Horses; The Big Broadcast of 1936	"Viennese Waltz" "It's the Animal in Me"	LeRoy Prinz
1935 (8th)	Broadway Hostess; Go into Your Dance	"Playboy from Paree" "Latin from Manhattan"	Bobby Connolly
1935 (8th)	Gold Diggers of 1935	"Lullaby of Broadway" "The Words Are in My Heart"	Busby Berkeley
1935 (8th)	King of Burlesque	"Lovely Lady" "Too Good to Be True"	Sammy Lee
1935 (8th)	She	"Hall of Kings"	Benjamin Zemach
1935 (8th)	Top Hat	"Piccolino" "Top Hat"	Hermes Pan
1936 (9th)
1936 (9th)	The Great Ziegfeld	"A Pretty Girl Is Like a Melody"	Seymour Felix
1936 (9th)	Born to Dance	"Swingin' the Jinx Away"	Dave Gould
1936 (9th)	Cain and Mabel	"1000 Love Songs"	Bobby Connolly
1936 (9th)	Dancing Pirate	"The Finale"	Russell Lewis
1936 (9th)	Gold Diggers of 1937	"Love and War"	Busby Berkeley
1936 (9th)	One in a Million	"Skating Ensemble"	Jack Haskell
1936 (9th)	Swing Time	"Bojangles of Harlem"	Hermes Pan
1937 (10th)
1937 (10th)	A Damsel in Distress	"Fun House"	Hermes Pan
1937 (10th)	Ali Baba Goes to Town	"Swing Is Here to Stay"	Sammy Lee
1937 (10th)	A Day at the Races	"All God's Chillun Got Rhythm"	Dave Gould
1937 (10th)	Ready, Willing and Able	"Too Marvelous for Words"	Bobby Connolly
1937 (10th)	Thin Ice	"Prince Igor Suite"	Harry Losee
1937 (10th)	Varsity Show	"The Finale"	Busby Berkeley
1937 (10th)	Waikiki Wedding	"Luau"	LeRoy Prinz

== See also ==
- List of Academy Award–nominated films
