= Broadway Hostess =

1935 film by Frank McDonald

- Directed by: Frank McDonald
- Screenplay by: George Bricker
- Story by: Benjamin M. Kaye (Uncredited)
- Produced by: Bryan Foy
- Starring: Wini Shaw; Genevieve Tobin; Lyle Talbot
- Cinematography: Arthur L. Todd (photography)
- Edited by: Jack Killifer
- Music by: Mort Dixon (Music and lyrics); Leo F. Forbstein (Musical director); Allie Wrubel (Music and lyrics); Ray Heindorf (Music arranger-uncredited)
- Production company: First National Pictures
- Distributed by: Warner Bros. Pictures
- Release date: December 7, 1935
- Running time: 68 minutes
- Country: United States
- Language: English

Broadway Hostess is a 1935 American romantic comedy musical film directed by Frank McDonald and starring Wini Shaw, Genevieve Tobin and Lyle Talbot. The film was nominated at the 1935 Academy Awards for the short lived Best Dance Direction category. For which Bobby Connolly was nominated for, along with the film Go into Your Dance.

== Plot ==
Shaw plays a small town girl on her rise to stardom as a night club singer who is nevertheless not as fortunate with love. Pianist Tommy falls for her, even though he suspects she's in love with her manager Lucky. Lucky claims he doesn't want to get married, but is in fact in love with socialite Iris, who brings him into her circle of rich snobs, including her brother, a hot-tempered drunk with a huge gambling problem.

== Cast ==
=== Main ===
- Winifred Shaw as Winnie
- Genevieve Tobin as Iris
- Lyle Talbot as Lucky
- Allen Jenkins as Fishcake
- Phil Regan as Tommy
- Marie Wilson as Dorothy
- Spring Byington as Mrs. Duncan-Griswald-Wembly-Smythe
- Joseph King as Big Joe Jarvis
- Donald Ross as Ronnie Marvin
- Frank Dawson as Morse - Iris' Butler
- Harry Seymour as Club Intime Emcee

=== Uncredited (Incomplete) ===
- Ward Bond as Lucky's Henchman
- Richard Powell as Third Member of Quartet in 'Playboy of Paree' Number
- June Travis as Mrs. Bannister
- Jack Wise as Nightclub Waiter
- Jane Wyman as a chorus girl

== Reviews ==
Andre Sennwald of The New York Times gave it a bad review saying it was very clichéd and hard to sit through.
