= Leading actor =

Actor playing a main role

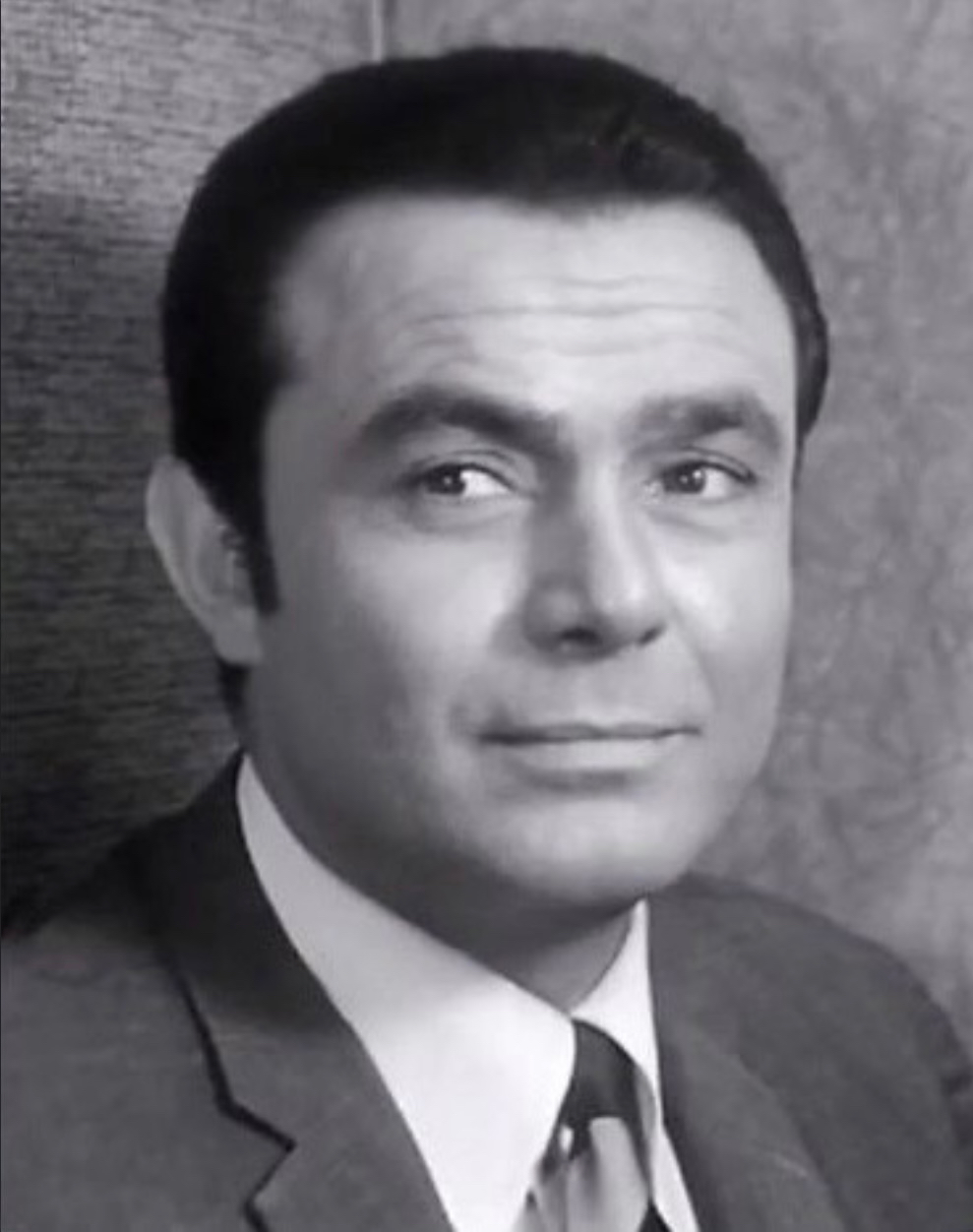
Salah Zulfikar was a leading actor in over 80 major Egyptian productions.

A leading actor, leading actress, or leading man or lady or simply lead (/ˈliːd/), plays a main role in a film, television series, television film or play.

== Term ==
As well as referring to the leading actor in a particular film, the word lead may also refer to the largest role in the piece, and leading actor may refer to a person who typically plays such parts or an actor with a respected body of work. Some actors are typecast as leads, but most play the lead in some performances and supporting or character roles in others.

== Variants and examples ==
Sometimes there is more than one significant leading role in a dramatic piece, and the actors are said to play co-leads; a large supporting role may be considered a secondary lead. Award nominations for acting often reflect such ambiguities. Therefore, sometimes two actors in the same performance piece are Academy Award–nominated for Best Actor or Best Actress—categories traditionally reserved for leads. For example, in 1935 Clark Gable, Charles Laughton and Franchot Tone were each nominated for the Best Actor Academy Award for Mutiny on the Bounty. There can even be controversy over whether a particular performance should be nominated in the Best Actor/Actress or Best Supporting Actor/Best Supporting Actress category; for instance, The Godfather's Al Pacino boycotted the 45th Academy Awards ceremony since he was insulted at being nominated for the Academy Award for Best Supporting Actor award; he noted that he had more screen time than his co-star and Best Actor winner Marlon Brando and so he should have received an Academy Award nomination for Best Actor.

This chart visualizes the age distribution of Best Actor and Best Actress Academy Award winners from 1928 (1st edition) to 2023 (96th edition).

A title role is often but not necessarily the lead. A lead role must also be differentiated from a starring role, which means that an actor is credited as a part of the main cast but not that they necessarily play the main character.

== See also ==
- Best Actor
- Character actor
- Casting (performing arts)
