= Walking Down Broadway =

1938 film by Norman Foster

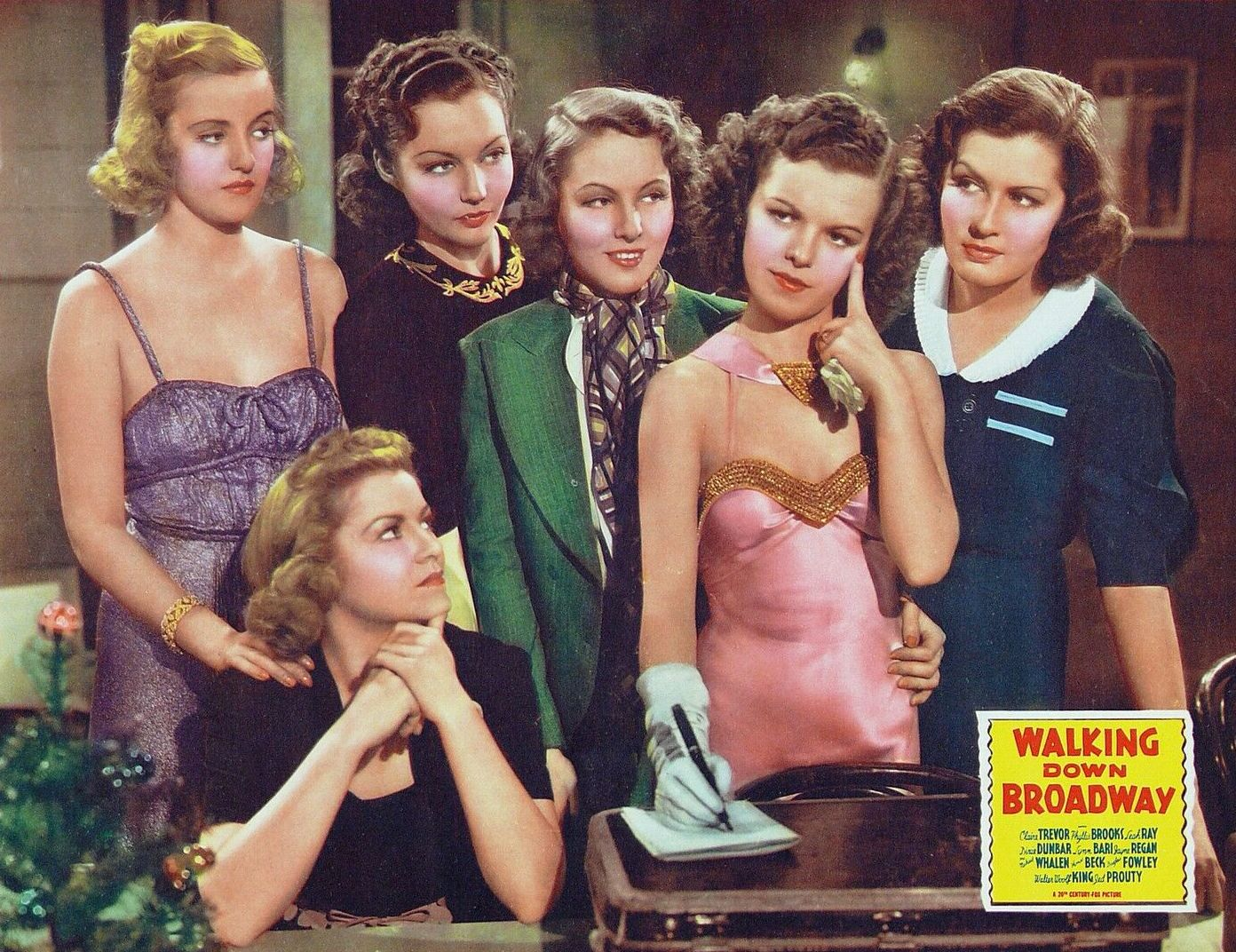
- Lobby card
- Directed by: Norman Foster
- Screenplay by: Robert Chapin; Karen DeWolf
- Produced by: Sol Glover
- Starring: Claire Trevor; Phyllis Brooks; Leah Ray
- Cinematography: Virgil Miller
- Edited by: Norman Colbert
- Distributed by: Twentieth Century-Fox Film Corporation
- Release date: March 11, 1938
- Running time: 75 minutes
- Country: United States
- Language: English

Walking Down Broadway is a 1938 American drama film made by Twentieth Century-Fox Film Corporation and directed by Norman Foster.

== Plot ==
A quintet of New York City chorus girls plan a reunion for the one-year anniversary of their show's closing. They discover the different paths their careers and lives have taken.

== Cast ==
- Claire Trevor as Joan Bradley
- Phyllis Brooks as Vicki Stone
- Leah Ray as Linda Martin
- Dixie Dunbar as Tiny Brunson
- Lynn Bari as Sandra DeVoe
- Jayne Regan as Jerry Lane
- Michael Whalen Peter Claybourne
- Paul Fix as Man in Baccarat Club Bar
