= 1936 Academy Awards =

1936 Academy Awards may refer to:

- 8th Academy Awards, the Academy Awards ceremony that took place in 1936
- 9th Academy Awards, the 1937 ceremony honoring the best in film for 1936
