= Folies Bergère de Paris =

1935 film by Roy Del Ruth

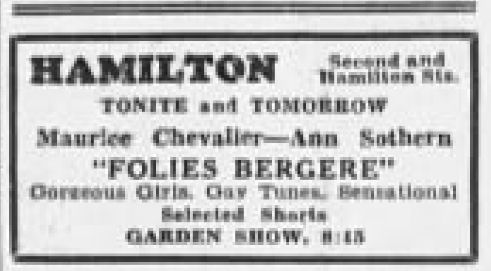
- Newspaper advertisement
- Directed by: Roy Del Ruth
- Written by: Jessie Ernst (adaptation); Bess Meredyth (screenplay); Hal Long (screenplay); Darryl F. Zanuck (contributing writer-uncredited)
- Based on: The Red Cat by Rudolph Lothar and Hans Adler
- Produced by: William Goetz; Raymond Griffith; Darryl F. Zanuck
- Starring: Maurice Chevalier; Ann Sothern; Merle Oberon
- Cinematography: J. Peverell Marley; Barney McGill
- Edited by: Allen McNeil; Sherman Todd
- Music by: Score: Alfred Newman (uncredited); Songs: Henri Christiné (music); Jack Stern (music); Burton Lane (music); Victor Young (music); Albert Willemetz (lyrics); Jack Meskill (lyrics); Harold Adamson (lyrics); Bing Crosby (lyrics); Ned Washington (lyrics)
- Production company: Twentieth Century Pictures
- Distributed by: United Artists
- Release date: February 22, 1935
- Running time: 82 minutes
- Country: United States
- Language: English

Folies Bergère de Paris is a 1935 American musical comedy film produced by Darryl Zanuck for 20th Century Films, directed by Roy Del Ruth and starring Maurice Chevalier, Merle Oberon and Ann Sothern. At the 8th Academy Awards, the “Straw Hat” number, choreographed by Dave Gould, won the short-lived Academy Award for Best Dance Direction, sharing the honor with “I've Got a Feelin' You're Foolin'” from Broadway Melody of 1936. The film, based on the 1934 play The Red Cat by Rudolph Lothar and Hans Adler, is a story of mistaken identity, with Maurice Chevalier playing both a music-hall star and a business tycoon who resembles him.

This was Chevalier's last film in Hollywood for twenty years, and reprised familiar themes such as the straw hat and a rendering of the French song "Valentine". This is also the last film to be distributed by Twentieth Century Pictures before it merged with Fox Film in 1935 to form 20th Century Fox.

Zanuck simultaneously produced a French-language version of the story, also directed by Roy Del Ruth, called L'homme des Folies Bergère. It stars Chevalier and Natalie Paley and Sim Viva. Because that film was intended for the French market, they shot scenes showing chorus girls bare breasted. When censor Joseph Breen heard of it, he insisted that the Production Code be enforced even in a film destined for another country. The American Film Institute catalog site describes Zanuck's losing battle with the censors.

The Red Cat, which was produced for the Broadway stage by Zanuck, ran for only 13 performances, but the studio benefited from four film adaptations. The third and fourth versions were in Technicolor, these being That Night in Rio, (1941) directed by Irving Cummings (and starring Don Ameche, Alice Faye and Carmen Miranda) followed by On the Riviera (1951), directed by Walter Lang (and starring Danny Kaye, Gene Tierney and Corinne Calvet).

== Cast ==
- Maurice Chevalier as Eugene Charlier / Baron Fernand Cassini
- Ann Sothern as Mimi
- Merle Oberon as Baroness Genevieve Cassini
- Eric Blore as Francois
- Ferdinand Munier as Morrisot
- Walter Byron as Marquis René de Lac
- Lumsden Hare as Gustave
- Robert Greig as Henri
- Ferdinand Gottschalk as Perishot
- Halliwell Hobbes as Monsieur Paulet
- Georges Renavent as Premier of France
- Phillip Dare as Victor
- Frank McGlynn Sr. as Joseph
- Barbara Leonard as Toinette
- Olin Howland as Stage Manager

== See also ==
- Folies Bergère
