= Sherry Shourds =

American film director

- Born: Walter Sherborne Shourds Jr. March 15, 1906; Philadelphia, Pennsylvania, USA
- Died: February 13, 1991 (aged 84); Burbank, California, USA
- Occupations: assistant director, directorer and production manager
- Years active: 1929-1967

Walter Sherborne "Sherry" Shourds Jr. (March 15, 1906 – February 13, 1991) was an American assistant director, director and production manager who was a write-in nomination during the 8th Academy Awards for the short lived Best Assistant Director category for A Midsummer Night's Dream, which was also the 2nd and last year the Academy Awards allowed write-in votes. He also helped on the television show Bonanza.

== Selected filmography ==
- The Iron Mask (1929)
- Captain Blood (1935)
- A Midsummer Night's Dream (1935)
- Angels with Dirty Faces (1938)
- Four Daughters (1938)
- All This, and Heaven Too (1940)
- The Letter (1940)
- The Sea Wolf (1941)
- Kings Row (1942)
- The Big Punch (1948) (director)
- I Confess (1953) (production manager)
