= She (1935 film) =

1935 film by Irving Pichel

- Theatrical release poster
- Directed by: Lansing C. Holden; Irving Pichel
- Screenplay by: Dudley Nichols; Ruth Rose
- Based on: She: A History of Adventure; 1887 novel by H. Rider Haggard
- Produced by: Merian C. Cooper; Shirley Burden (associate)
- Starring: Helen Gahagan; Randolph Scott; Helen Mack; Nigel Bruce; Gustav von Seyffertitz
- Cinematography: J. Roy Hunt
- Edited by: Ted Cheeseman
- Music by: Max Steiner
- Production company: RKO Radio Pictures
- Distributed by: RKO Radio Pictures
- Release date: July 12, 1935 (United States)
- Running time: 102 minutes (original theatrical release); 94 minutes (1949 re-release)
- Country: United States
- Language: English

She is a 1935 American adventure film produced by Merian C. Cooper. It is based on the 1887 novel of the same name by H. Rider Haggard. A man named Leo Vincey travels with his friend and the daughter of a guide to a mysterious place in Northern Siberia, where his ancestor reported finding the secret to immortality. They discover a lost world where a woman named She Who Must Be Obeyed - known as "She" - rules over an exotic civilization.

The film stars Helen Gahagan, Randolph Scott and Nigel Bruce. Cooper originally wanted to film She in color, but switched to black-and-white after last-minute budget cuts.

The ancient civilization of Kor is depicted in an Art Deco style, combined with influences from Egyptian, Greek, and Mayan art. Special effects were performed through the use of miniatures and matte paintings, along with other techniques. Max Steiner, who composed the score, considered it one of his greatest works. Ruth Rose adapted the story for the screen.

At its initial release in 1935, it lost money, but was more popular in 1949 when it was billed with The Last Days of Pompeii. Reception in 1935 praised the film's spectacle, but found the plot slow and uninteresting. Reviews from the end of the 20th century agreed that the sets, costumes, and special effects were impressive, but found the acting lacking.

== Plot ==
A man named Leo Vincey is called from America to the family's ancestral estate in England where his dying uncle John Vincey and his friend Horace Holly convince him that his ancestor, also named John Vincey, found the secret of immortality nearly 500 years ago in the far north, though only his wife returned. Dying, she wrote a letter to her son describing their adventures, including the Flame of Life. Leo is shown a painting of his ancestor, which looks remarkably like him.

Following the route outlined in the letter, Leo and Holly travel through frozen Arctic wastes, with a guide named Tugmore and his daughter Tanya joining them on their quest. During their travels, Leo and Tanya begin falling in love.

They find a corpse wearing a gold chain and a sabre-tooth tiger, all encased in ice, all as mentioned in the letter. Tugmore attacks the ice with his axe for the gold, despite Holly's warning that any sound could trigger an avalanche. Holly is proved correct, and Tugmore is killed, but the avalanche reveals a passageway through the massive cliffs barring their way north. Inside the cave system, they encounter a primitive tribe and are about to be killed when they are saved by Billali and his soldiers. They are taken to the ancient city of Kor, following the standing order that all strangers are to be brought to its ruler, She Who Must Be Obeyed.

She is immortal, due to her immersion in the Flame of Life. She believes that Leo is the reincarnation of John Vincey — her long-lost love — and vows to make him immortal too to rule by her side. Later, she reveals she killed John in a fit of jealousy. Tanya warns Leo that nothing human can live forever, but Leo cannot resist the temptation of eternal life. When She becomes jealous again, Billali suggests that Tanya be forced to replace the human sacrifice required to make Leo immortal.

During the ceremony, Leo finally recognizes the veiled Tanya. He frees her, and the trio battle their way through the crowd and flee ... straight to the chamber containing the Flame of Life. She and Billali arrive by a shorter path. She asks Leo to step into the Flame of Life. To prove it is safe, She steps into the Flame herself, but her second immersion proves fatal: She ages with each eruption of the Flame, finally becoming a withered crone and dying. Leo, Holly, and Tanya escape and return to England.

== Cast ==
- Helen Gahagan as She (Who Must Be Obeyed)
- Randolph Scott as Leo Vincey
- Nigel Bruce as Professor Horace Holly
- Helen Mack as Tanya Dugmore
- Gustav von Seyffertitz as Billali
- Lumsden Hare as Dugmore
- Samuel S. Hinds as John Vincey
- Noble Johnson as Amahaggar Chief
- Jim Thorpe as Captain of the Guard (uncredited)

== Production ==
=== Development ===
In July 1932, Universal Studios announced they had bought the rights to the story. John L. Balderston had written a script, and changed the ending into a tragedy where all of the main characters die. This displeased the president of Universal, who tried to sell the rights to the adaptation, which he had bought. The original story was set in Africa and included a marriage between Leo, who is white, and a native black woman. The Hays Code, enacted in 1934, forbade depictions of "miscegenation" (which includes interracial marriage) in film. In order to avoid this, the film is set in a temperate Arctic instead of Africa. Writing in Science Fiction, Mark Bould criticizes the change in location, stating that "the eroticism essential to the narrative diffuses into the mise-en-scene". In his biography of Cooper, Mark Vaz writes that Cooper changed the location because he felt Africa wasn't as mysterious of a location anymore. In July 1934, RKO announced they would make the film the following year as one of the studio's big productions. Helen Gahagan's and Nigel Bruce's casting was announced in January 1935. It was Gahagan's first movie after a long theatre career. Gahagan did not act in any other films after her role in She.

RKO hoped that She would follow Cooper's previous success, King Kong. Cooper had originally intended to shoot the film in color, but budget cuts by RKO forced him to shoot the film in black and white at the last minute. This film, along with The Last Days of Pompeii, were part of a two-picture agreement with Cooper, with the initial agreement stating that each film would be made for $1 million each. However, in pre-production, RKO informed him of budget changes, stating that he would now have to shoot the two films for a combined $1 million rather than $1 million each. He stated that he "cheated a lot" on She to direct more money into Pompeii. He would later refer to the film as the "worst picture I ever made." One way Cooper reduced production costs on She was by reusing set materials. The grand palace with its ornate gates in She consisted of the gates to Skull Island from King Kong. Cooper planned a scene where the explorers are attacked by mammoths, to be animated by Willis O'Brien who worked on King Kong, but cut the scene to stay within budget.

Cooper and Irving Pichel had previously co-directed The Most Dangerous Game, and Pichel had previously directed Before Dawn when Cooper hired him to direct She. Landing C. Holden, an architectural designer, co-directed the film to ensure a unified vision for the film's visuals, which combine Art Deco sensibilities with exotic influences from Greek, Egyptian, and Mayan art. Over 1500 conceptual drawings were created for the film. Van Nest Polglase, Al Herman, and Vernon Walker did art direction for the film. Harold Miles designed the clothing and weapons for the men living in Kor and for Billali, the advisor to the queen. His designs included ceremonial knives and copper masks for the priests. Ailine Bernstein designed the costumes for the eponymous queen, including a feather cloak meant to look like fire. Bernstein also designed the dresses for the character of Helen Mack. J. Roy Hunt, an ingenious cinematographer who had filmed war scenes from planes, was responsible for cinematography. Benjamin Zemach choreographed the dancing for the scene in the throne room where crowds of priests, soldiers, and dancers enter the room.

Ruth Rose collaborated with Cooper to create an adaptation focused on adventure and romance, with the city set inside an inactive volcano. Rose constructed a language for Kor inspired by Arabic. Dudley Nichols wrote additional dialogue for the script. Rose made several changes to the original story. She removed the 20-year interval at the beginning of the story to improve its pacing, and made She 500 years old instead of 2,000 years old, perhaps to be more believable. Rose also added the pseudoscience explanation that a type of radium poisoning might cause immortality.

=== Special effects ===
Mario Larrinaga was responsible for several matte paintings used in the special effects. The view of the sled dogs running across a frozen lake was a combination of live action with one of Larrinaga's paintings. He also painted the sabre-tooth tiger and its victims in ice, which was projected through stereopticon plates onto the set. Miniatures were used for the multiple deaths in the avalanche scene. Composited paintings were also used to show the landscape of Kor and the mountain palace. In order to create the feeling of a large space for the Hall of Kings (the location of the film's throne room and sacred flame), the set was double the size of a normal stage in the RKO lot in Culver City. Paintings of statues extended the set's walls past forty feet. The effect of She's rapid aging was achieved through Carl Axcelle's makeup, which created the effect of making her progressively older, with the filming aspect achieved through optical dissolves by Lin Dunn.

=== Music ===
Max Steiner composed the film's score in less than a month working on it day and night. A doctor gave him shots to help him stay awake to complete the score in time. He based his theme for the Queen of Kor on the notes from the theme for King Kong. He extended the theme by giving it what Nathan Platte called a "coiling, chromatic tail," inviting comparison of the film to King Kong. The theme itself is, according to Steiner's biographer Steven C. Smith, one of "mystery, followed by grandeur, followed by resignation". The constant quarter notes present during the depiction of the eternal flame are meant to evoke She's obsession with time. The music during the Hall of Kings ceremony took clear inspiration from The Rite of Spring. Steiner was proud of his work on She, declaring it "probably the best music I ever wrote" in 1944. RKO capitalized on the strength of She's score and hosted a preview of the film especially for music critics, who received it positively. On an interview on the colorized DVD, John Morgan said that Steiner's score was the first time a Hammond organ was used in a film score.

The score was reconstructed in the 1990s by John Morgan and recorded by the Moscow Symphony Orchestra under William T. Stromberg's direction. At Film Score Monthly, Timothy Greiving gave the soundtrack 3.5 stars, praising its strong themes, melodic sense, and orchestral textures. He described the use of a women's choir on some tracks as "both creepy and beautiful". While some sections clearly were meant to mimic on-screen actions, overall the score was "romantic and timeless".

== Reception ==
She premiered at Radio City Music Hall in August 1935 after advertising throughout July. The film, which cost $521,000 to make, had disappointing results at the box office. It initially lost $180,000, although it later had a successful re-release.

Contemporary reviews praised the special effects, but found the story uninteresting. Writing for The Spectator in 1935, Graham Greene reviewed the film positively, but gave a disclaimer that as "an unrepentant Haggard fan" he could not write reasonably about it. Describing the film as showcasing "earnestly manly Boy Scout virtues", Greene did acknowledge that it "bore its symbolism a little heavily", and ultimately characterized it as both thrilling and childish. At Variety in 1935, Robert J. Landry praised the production values of the film. He blamed the twilight-zone qualities of the story on the original Haggard story, concluding that "it's not an actor's picture. It's a cameraman's triumph and art director's picnic and a dancing master's joy." A July 1935 review in Film Daily wrote that the "gorgeous mammoth spectacle" was "uninteresting" and "overtalkative". The review at Motion Picture Daily was more optimistic, calling it a "spectacle [...] staged on a magnificent scale" and describing exciting moments of action. The New York Times wrote that, disappointingly, the events leading up to the discovery of the arctic city were more exciting than the events afterward. It continued, conceding that while the city is filled with "eye-filling spectacles," if the movie belonged anywhere, it would be "in the children's branch of the film library." Photoplay's review was positive, stating that the film was "a spectacle of magnificent proportions" with an "entirely convincing" supporting cast. Picture Play Magazine warned readers that the "strange, unearthly fantasy" was "interesting as a spectacle, not as drama."

Later reviews were mixed, praising some aspects of the film, but universally criticizing the pacing and acting. In a 1982 coffee table book on the history of RKO pictures, Jewell and Harbin reviewed the film, stating that the costumes, special effects, and sets were "impressive," but that the acting from Scott and Mack was "especially limp" and the screenplay "stilted and bathetic". In a 1995 article on She's production, George Turner evaluated Scott's acting as stiff and inexperienced, while Gahagan, sufficiently conveying dignity, cruelty, and tenderness, lacked "fiery sensuality on expects of the love-crazed queen." Turner concluded that "She was too arty" for broad appeal. Writing on science fiction films by RKO, Michael R. Pitts praised the special effects, especially during the avalanche scene. He complained that "boring ceremonial dances" slowed the action.

== Later releases ==
She originally had a running time of 102 minutes, but was edited to 94 minutes for its 1949 re-release to better fit on a double bill with Cooper's The Last Days of Pompeii. She was among the films believed lost but an original print was discovered in the garage of the silent film star Buster Keaton and was turned over to film distributor Raymond Rohauer for preservation.

== Awards and influence ==
Helen Gahagan's throne room look in She inspired the appearance of the Evil Queen in Walt Disney's animated film Snow White and the Seven Dwarfs (1937)

The film is listed in Golden Raspberry Award founder John Wilson's book The Official Razzie Movie Guide as one of the 100 Most Enjoyably Bad Movies Ever Made. Benjamin Zemach was nominated for an Academy Award for Best Dance Direction for the film at the 8th Academy Awards. Jim D'Arc, a film curator at Brigham Young University over the Cooper collection, said that She was a "pathbreaking film in the fantasy genre" since it was one of the first fantasy films created in the 1930s.

The appearance of the Evil Queen in Walt Disney's 1937 animated film Snow White and the Seven Dwarfs (1937) was inspired by Gahagan's throne room look as Ayesha in She.

The pit of snakes in Raiders of the Lost Ark (1981) was modeled after a scene in She.

== See also ==
- She (1965 film)
- She (1984 film)

== Works cited ==
- D'Arc, Jim (2007). Interview with Jim D'Arc (DVD (Disc 2)). Legend Films. ASIN B001BSBBIA.
- Harryhausen, Ray; Vaz, Mark (2007). Commentary by Ray Harryhausen and Mark Vaz (DVD (Disc 1)). Legend Films. ASIN B001BSBBIA.
- Jewell, Richard B.; Harbin, Vernon (1982). The RKO story. London: Octopus Books. p. 1935. ISBN 0517546566.
- Jewell, Richard B. (2012). RKO Radio Pictures: A Titan Is Born. University of California Press. ISBN 9780520951952.
- Landry, Robert J. (July 31, 1935). "She". Variety. 119 (7): 19.
- Pitts, Michael R. (2015). RKO Radio Pictures Horror, Science Fiction, and Fantasy Films, 1929-1956. Jefferson, North Carolina: McFarland and Company, Inc. ISBN 9780786460472.
- Smith, Steven C. (2020). Music by Max Steiner: the epic life of Hollywood's most influential composer. New York City: Oxford University Press. p. 164. ISBN 9780190623272.
- Turner, George (June 1995). "She: Empire of the Imagination". American Cinematographer. 76 (6).
- Vaz, Mark Cotta (August 2005). Living dangerously The adventures of Merian C. Cooper, creator of King Kong. Villard. ISBN 978-1-4000-6276-8.
