= Nini Theilade =

Danish ballet dancer (1915–2018)

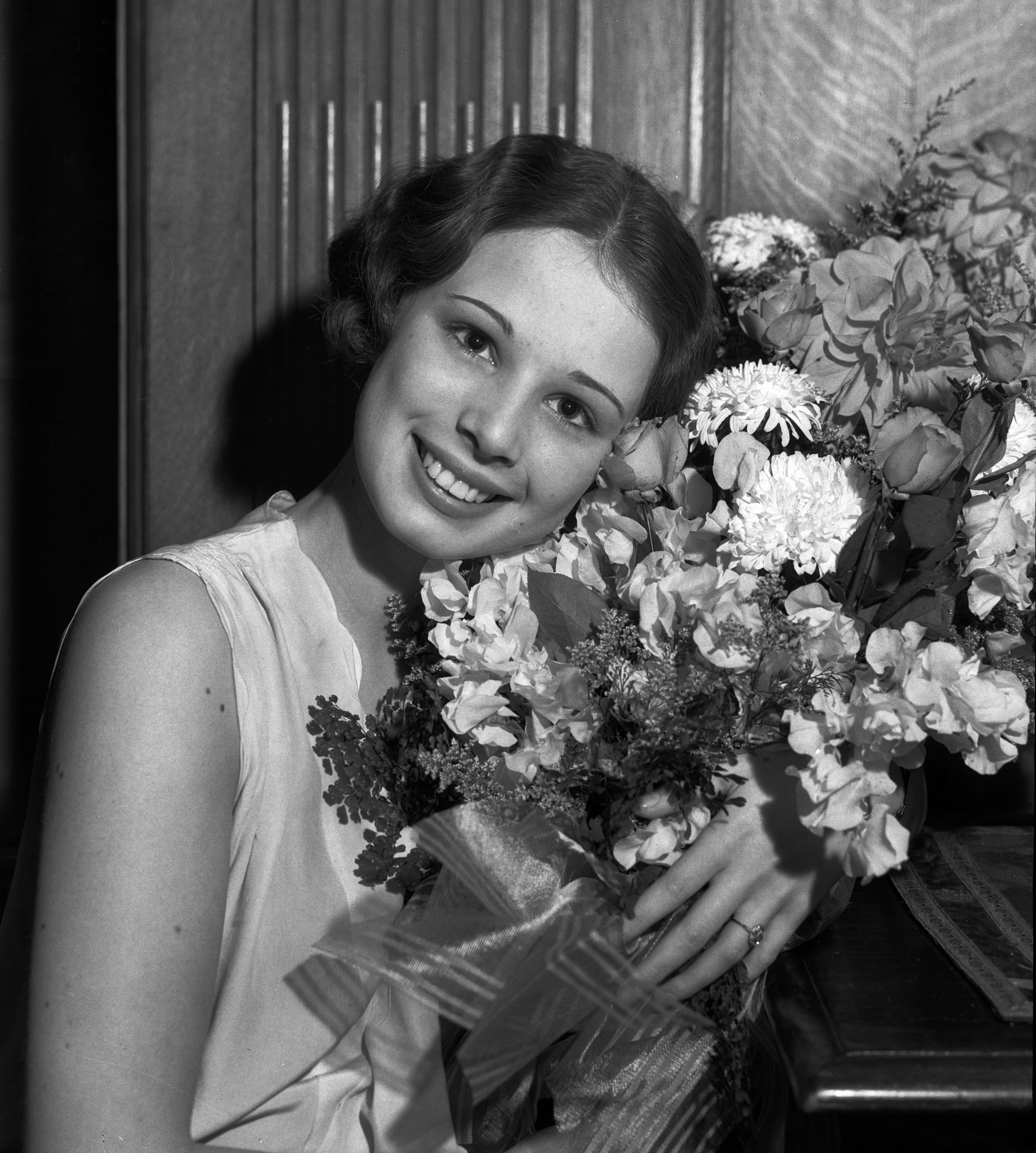
- Theilade in 1934
- Born: Nini Arlette Theilade; 15 June 1915; Purwokerto, Dutch East Indies
- Died: 13 February 2018 (aged 102); Hesselager, Svendborg Municipality, Denmark
- Occupations: Ballet dancer; choreographer; teacher
- Years active: 1925–2013
- Spouses: Piet Loopuyt (1940 – his death); Arne Buchter-Larsen (1967 – his death)
- Children: 2

Nini Arlette Theilade (15 June 1915 – 13 February 2018) was a Danish ballet dancer, choreographer and teacher.

== Early life ==
Theilade was born in Purwokerto on the island of Java, then in the Dutch East Indies, now in Indonesia. She was an only child. Her father, Hans Theilade, was a Danish engineer. Her mother, Joanna Catarina, née Wijnschenk-Dom, was from the Netherlands but was of Polish, German, French and Indian extraction; she had trained as a dance instructor at Émile Jaques-Dalcroze's school in Switzerland. She was named "Nini", which means "99", because she was reportedly the 99th descendant of a maharajah. When she was five, she discovered her mother after a suicide attempt; her shocked reaction caused a rift with her family until her mother discovered her talent for dance. In her autobiography, published in 2006, she noted how her mother's ambition shaped the rest of her life.

The family moved to Denmark in 1925, when she was ten, after she contracted malaria. In Copenhagen, she had private lessons with Asta Mollerup but was refused entry to the Royal Danish Ballet school because of weak ankles, so the family moved to Paris. Her mother hoped to place her in the ballet school run by Lubov Egorova, who trained the stars of the Ballets Russes, but the school only admitted adults at the time and she instead studied with Nadya Bryusova.

== Career ==
=== Dancer and choreographer ===
In 1929, aged 14, Theilade made her début in The Hague in a solo programme of various pieces choreographed by Asta Mollerup. It was such a success, she toured Europe and the United States. In 1931, she was a guest performer at the Royal Theatre, Copenhagen.

From 1931, under Max Reinhardt, she appeared in Berlin, Vienna, Salzburg and Florence. She also starred both as a dancer and actress in Reinhardt's Hollywood film A Midsummer Night's Dream in 1935.

From 1938 to 1940, she played many leading roles in the Ballet Russe de Monte Carlo which were choreographed for her by Léonide Massine. They included Venus in Bacchanale and Poverty in Nobilissima Visione, with costumes by Salvador Dalí. She performed as a guest at New York's Metropolitan Opera, dancing to Debussy's Clouds. After the outbreak of war in 1939, the company toured in the Americas.

In the late 1930s Theilade also choreographed several works for the Royal Danish Ballet, including Psyche in 1936 and Orbits in 1938, for which she was decorated by the king. A friend, Eva Tarp, noted that her style was softer and more gliding than the company's dancers were accustomed to.

=== Choreographer and instructor ===
She was dismissed from the Ballet Russe de Monte Carlo in 1940 after meeting and marrying her first husband, Piet Loopuyt, a Dutch financier, in Brazil. They lived in Rio de Janeiro where Theilade became an instructor, and later in Portugal.

In the 1950s, she left her husband and returned to Copenhagen as a choreographer. Among her productions were Metaphor with music by Niels Viggo Bentzon with Mona Vangsaae in the highly erotic leading role, and Concerto with music by Robert Schumann. In 1965, she settled in Denmark, producing Græsstrået, one of the earliest ballets for television, by composer Else Marie Pade and author El Forman.

From 1969 to 1978, she founded a ballet academy in Thurø with a ballet company that toured Europe. She also began her involvement as ballet instructor at Odense Theatre's school, which was to last 30 years. After running into financial difficulties at Thurø, she and her second husband, Arne Buchter-Larsen, accepted an invitation to set up a three-year course of study in Lyon, the Académie de Ballet Nini Theilade. The school remains active. She left Lyon in 1990 at the age of 75 to return to Denmark, where she continued to be active in drama and dance productions. In particular, until the age of 98 she taught dance at Oure Sport & Performing Arts School on the island of Funen.

== Personal life ==
Theilade's first marriage, to Piet Loopuyt, who was several years older than her, ended in separation; he died in the mid-1960s. They had a son and a daughter; her daughter predeceased her. She remarried to Arne Buchter-Larsen in 1967; he died in 1987.

She spent her last four years in Hesselager Care Centre in Svendborg Municipality, where she died on 13 February 2018 at the age of 102.
