= Pigskin Parade =

1936 film by David Butler

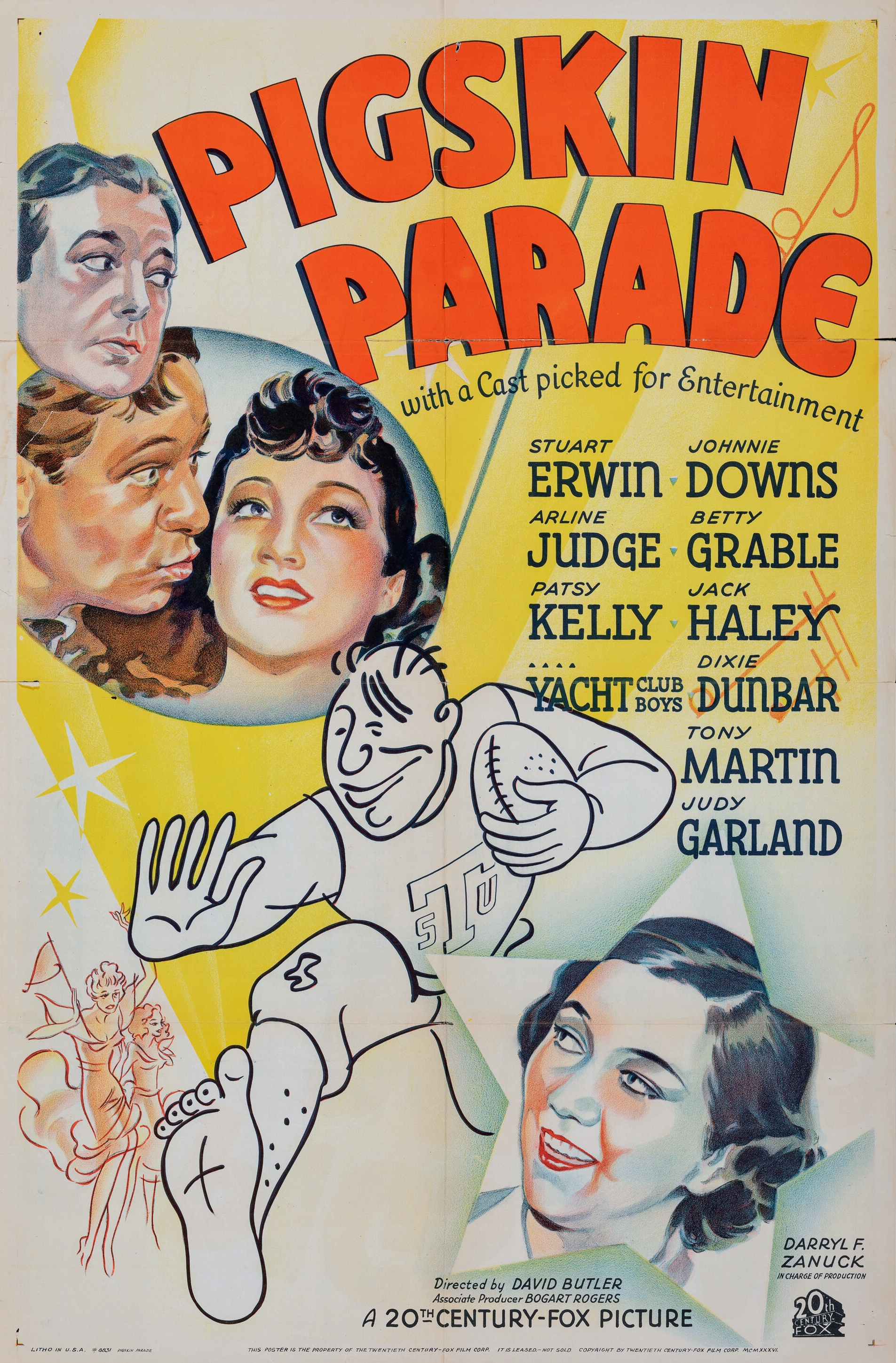
- Promotional release poster
- Directed by: David Butler
- Written by: William M. Conselman; Mark Kelly; Nat Perrin; Arthur Sheekman; Harry Tugend; Jack Yellen
- Produced by: Bogart Rogers; Darryl F. Zanuck
- Starring: Stuart Erwin; Patsy Kelly; Jack Haley; Betty Grable; Judy Garland
- Cinematography: Arthur C. Miller
- Edited by: Irene Morra
- Music by: David Buttolph
- Distributed by: 20th Century Fox
- Release date: October 23, 1936
- Running time: 93 minutes
- Country: United States
- Language: English
- Box office: $900,000

Pigskin Parade is a 1936 American musical comedy film which tells the story of husband-and-wife college football coaches who convince a backwoods player to play for their team so they can go to the big game. It was written by William M. Conselman, Mary Kelly, Nat Perrin, Arthur Sheekman, Harry Tugend, and Jack Yellen and was directed by David Butler.

The cast includes Stuart Erwin (in an Oscar-nominated performance), Jack Haley, Patsy Kelly, Arline Judge, Dixie Dunbar, Johnny Downs, Betty Grable, Tony Martin, and Judy Garland in her feature-film debut. The film was distributed by 20th Century Fox.

== Plot ==
Due to a misunderstanding, Yale inadvertently invites the small Texas State University to come to Connecticut and play against its football team for a benefit game. Coincidentally, TSU has just hired a new coach, Slug Winters, who arrives at the college with his wife Bessie just in time to hear the announcement that the team is to play Yale.

The coach digs in to whip the team into shape, with Bessie's help, she knowing more about football than Slug does, but just before the big game, Bessie causes an accident and the team's quarterback Biff Bentley breaks his leg. All seems hopeless until Slug and Bessie stumble across an Arkansas hillbilly named Amos Dodd, who throws a football like no one they have ever seen. They find him tossing melons with his sister, Sairy Dodd.

The only problem remaining is to figure a way to get the college to enroll the hillbilly so that he can take the place of the injured quarterback. Amos also falls for attractive student Sally Saxon, bringing out jealousy in her rich suitor, Mortimer Higgins.

Texas State travels to the game at Yale, which is played in a blizzard. During halftime, the Yacht Club Boys sing their planned entertainment: "We Brought the Texas Sunshine Down with Us". The freezing Yale crowd responds with a barrage of snowballs. Yale is leading 7–6 in the final minutes, when Slug accidentally knocks himself unconscious on the sideline. Bessie takes over and sends in a play, which hillbilly Amos runs barefoot for the winning touchdown. To celebrate their victory, everyone sings the "Texas Tornado".

== Cast ==
- Stuart Erwin as Amos Dodd
- Jack Haley as Slug
- Patsy Kelly as Bessie
- Arline Judge as Sally Saxon
- Grady Sutton as Mortimer
- Fred Kohler Jr. as Biff
- Johnny Downs as Chip Carson
- Tony Martin as Tommy
- Dixie Dunbar as Ginger Jones
- Betty Grable as Laura Watson
- Judy Garland as Sairy Dodd
- Si Jenks as Baggage Master
- Yacht Club Boys
- Carol Adams as student (uncredited)
- Lynn Bari as Football Game Spectator (uncredited)
- Muriel Scheck as Dancer (uncredited)

== Award nominations ==
Award nominations for Pigskin Parade
Year	Nominee / work	Award	Result
1936	Stuart Erwin	Academy Award for Best Supporting Actor	Nominated

== See also ==
- List of American football films
