= Sing and Be Happy =

1937 film by James Tinling

- Theatrical release poster
- Directed by: James Tinling
- Screenplay by: Lou Breslow; Ben Markson; John Patrick
- Produced by: Milton Feld
- Starring: Tony Martin; Leah Ray; Joan Davis; Helen Westley; Allan Lane; Dixie Dunbar
- Cinematography: Daniel B. Clark
- Music by: Gene Rose
- Production company: 20th Century Fox
- Distributed by: 20th Century Fox
- Release date: June 25, 1937
- Running time: 64 minutes
- Country: United States
- Language: English

Sing and Be Happy is a 1937 American comedy film directed by James Tinling and written by Lou Breslow, Ben Markson and John Patrick. The film stars Tony Martin, Leah Ray, Joan Davis, Helen Westley, Allan Lane and Dixie Dunbar. The film was released on June 25, 1937, by 20th Century Fox.

== Cast ==
- Tony Martin as Buzz Mason
- Leah Ray as Ann Lane
- Joan Davis as Myrtle
- Helen Westley as Mrs. Henty
- Allan Lane as Hamilton Howe
- Dixie Dunbar as Della Dunn
- Chick Chandler as Mike
- Berton Churchill as John Mason
- Andrew Tombes as Thomas Lane
- Luis Alberni as Posini
- Frank McGlynn, Sr. as Sheriff
- Edward Cooper as Mason's Butler
