= One in a Million (1936 film) =

1936 film by Sidney Lanfield

- Directed by: Sidney Lanfield
- Written by: Leonard Praskins; Mark Kelly; Eddie Cherkose; Lester Lee; Samuel Porkass; Harold Rome
- Produced by: Raymond Griffith; Ben Silvey
- Starring: Sonja Henie; Adolphe Menjou; Jean Hersholt; Ned Sparks; Don Ameche; The Ritz Brothers; Arline Judge; Borrah Minevitch; Julius Tannen; Montagu Love
- Cinematography: Edward Cronjager; John Van Wormer
- Edited by: Robert L. Simpson; John Brady; Jack Wells
- Music by: David Buttolph; Charles Maxwell; Louis Silvers
- Distributed by: Twentieth Century-Fox Film Corporation
- Release dates: December 31, 1936 (Premiere-New York City); January 1, 1937 (US)
- Running time: 95 min
- Country: United States
- Language: English
- Box office: $1.3 million

One in a Million is a 1936 American musical comedy film directed by Sidney Lanfield and starring Sonja Henie, Adolphe Menjou and Don Ameche. It marked the Hollywood debut of the ice skater Henie. It was the first of a series of Twentieth Century-Fox musicals made by Henie, although she had previously made a silent film in her native Norway. The film features footage from the 1936 Winter Olympic Games.

Choreographer Jack Haskell received an Academy Award nomination in Best Dance Direction at the 9th Academy Awards. One in a Million proved to be one of the highest-grossing films of 1937.

== Plot ==
American showman Thaddeus Spencer (Adolphe Menjou) is stuck without money in the Swiss Alps with his wife Billie (Arline Judge), a girls' band, a comedy trio (The Ritz Brothers) and a recent harmonica-playing discovery (Borrah Minevitch) when the group learns that the Grand Palace Hotel in Ardetz, where they were to perform, has burned down. Upon seeing Greta Muller (Sonja Henie), an innkeeper's daughter, ice-skate, Spencer has a vision of her performing with a skating ballet that will make him millions. He arranges for her to skate in a tryout performance at a St. Moritz casino for which he will be paid 950 francs.

American reporter Bob Harris (Don Ameche) from the Paris Herald arrives at the inn to investigate the hotel fire which, rumor has it, was an attempt to kill a European premier. Bob has his photographer, Danny Simpson (Ned Sparks), trail Ratoffsky (Montagu Love), a suspicious-looking bearded guest, and tries to romance Greta, who is sullen after a band member has Bob massage her neck.

When Bob learns that Greta's father Heinrich Muller (Jean Hersholt), a 1908 Olympic figure skating champion who lost his medal because he accepted money as a gift for teaching, has trained Greta for twelve years for the upcoming Olympics, he follows the troupe to St. Moritz and stops Greta after her first number, warning that she is risking her Olympic eligibility. Unaware that her exhibition involved money, Greta is grateful to Bob as they ride back on a sleigh.

At the Olympics, Greta wins first place in figure skating, but when she refuses to turn professional and skate for Spencer in New York, he threatens to expose her St. Moritz performance to the ruling committee. Heinrich returns Greta's medals himself when he learns of the St. Moritz exhibition, but Bob takes Spencer to explain the situation to the secretary of the committee, Sir Frederick Brooks (Montagu Love), who earlier was vacationing in the Alps incognito as Ratoffsky. As Greta has received no payment and Spencer has used all the money he received for expenses, Brooks declares Greta's eligibility proven, and the whole troupe, with Greta now as the star, performs in Madison Square Garden.

== Cast ==
- Sonja Henie as Greta Muller
- Adolphe Menjou as Thaddeus Spencer
- Jean Hersholt as Heinrich Muller
- Ned Sparks as Danny Simpson
- Don Ameche as Bob Harris
- The Ritz Brothers as Themselves
- Arline Judge as Billie Spencer
- Borrah Minevitch as Adolphe
- Borrah Minevitch and His Harmonica Rascals as Harmonica Ensemble
- Dixie Dunbar as Goldie
- Julius Tannen as Chapelle
- Montagu Love as Ratoffsky, alias "Sir Frederick Brooks, Olympic Secretary"
- Gwen Lee as Kitty Kennedy
- Girls' band: Leah Ray, Shirley Deane, June Gale, Lillian Porter, Helen Ericson, Diane Cook, Bonnie Bannon, June Wilkins, Clarice Sherry, and Pauline Craig

== Awards ==
Jack Haskell nominated for Best Dance Direction

== Reception ==
Variety described One in a Million as a "very entertaining, adroitly mixed concoction of romance, music, comedy and skating [that] introduces to film audiences Olympic figure-skating champion Sonja Henie." Henie's "assets" were listed as "A sweet demeanor, engaging personality, an intriguing Scandinavian accent and an abundance of poise."

In their March, 1937 edition, Modern Screen gave the film a three-star review and heralded Sonja Henie as "a distinctive new star" whose skating sequences are "marvels of rhythm and grace." As an actress she was described as "more than acceptable." It noted that Adolphe Menjou, Arline Judge and the Ritz Brothers provided most of the film’s comedy and that Don Ameche was "sincere in the romantic scenes and a bit uncomfortable when he’s the wisecracking reporter."

In 2020, Filmink called it "A grab bag of a movie. Plays like a variety show with a whole collection of acts. Fascinating to see how they protect [Henie]." Figure skating writer and historian Ellyn Kestnbaum analyzed the film in her book Culture on Ice: Figure Skating and Cultural Meaning (2003) to demonstrate her discussion about specularity in figure skating and "how the image of competitive skating made its way into the American consciousness through its depiction in the image-driven mass medium of Hollywood film".

The movie was originally banned in Nazi Germany because the Ritz Brothers, a Jewish-American comedy trio, were in the cast. It was cleared for exhibition in the country after Henie pressured Propaganda Minister Joseph Goebbels on his private line to remove any scene in which any member of the trio was featured.
