= The Big Punch (1948 film) =

1948 film by Sherry Shourds

- Poster for The Big Punch
- Directed by: Sherry Shourds
- Written by: George Carleton Brown; Bernard Girard
- Produced by: Saul Elkins
- Starring: Gordon MacRae; Lois Maxwell; Wayne Morris; Mary Stuart; Eddie Dunn
- Cinematography: Carl Guthrie
- Edited by: Frank Magee
- Music by: William Lava
- Distributed by: Warner Bros. Pictures
- Release date: June 25, 1948
- Running time: 80 min.
- Country: United States
- Language: English
- Budget: $227,000
- Box office: $670,000

The Big Punch is an American drama boxing film released in 1948. The film was directed by Sherry Shourds, produced by Saul Elkins and stars Gordon MacRae, Lois Maxwell, Wayne Morris, Mary Stuart and Eddie Dunn. It is considered to be a film noir and was MacRae's film debut after having signed a five-year contract with Warner Bros. Pictures.

== Plot ==
New York City boxer Johnny Grant has been ordered by his manager to throw his next match, but Johnny double-crosses him and knocks out his opponent instead. To even the score, the manager kills a police officer and frames Johnny for the murder.

Johnny leaves town and hides out with pastor Chris Thorgenson in a small Pennsylvania town. Johnny phones his girlfriend Midge Parker and asks that she hire a private detective to clear his name. Chris helps him secure a bank job, but Johnny is blackmailed into robbing the bank. Johnny refuses and plots to run away, but Chris stops him.

A police chief identifies Johnny as the wanted killer. Karen Long convinces the chief to let them find the real murderer, and she and Chris travel to New York to help with the search. The real killer is revealed, and now that his name has been cleared, Johnny returns to New York.

== Cast ==
The picture marked MacRae's film-acting debut after having signed a five-year contract with Warner Bros. Maxwell would later be cast in the role of Miss Moneypenny in the James Bond franchise from 1962 - 1985, and Stuart went on to appear in the soap operas Search for Tomorrow (35 years), One Life to Live and Guiding Light.

- Wayne Morris as Chris Thorgenson
- Lois Maxwell as Karen Long
- Gordon MacRae as Johnny Grant
- Mary Stuart as Midge Parker
- Anthony Warde as Con Festig
- Jimmy Ames as Angel Panzer
- Marc Logan as Milo Brown
- Eddie Dunn as Ed Hardy
- Charles Marsh as Sam Bancroft
- Dick Walsh as Quarterback
- Douglas Kennedy as Announcer
- Joe McTurk as Blinkie

== Reception ==
Variety said of MacRae's film debut: "He should get along in films, presenting an easy personality and an ability to read lines credibly. He doesn't need vocalizing to sell himself."

Leonard Maltin said that the film was a "serviceable melodrama." The Internet Movie Database rates it as 6.6/10 based on user reviews. The Screen Guild Theater broadcast a 30-minute radio adaptation of the story on February 3, 1949 (episode 412), with Wayne Morris reprising his film role.

According to Warner Bros. records, the film earned $493,000 domestically and $177,000 foreign.

== See also ==
- List of boxing films
- List of film noir titles
