= Asta Mollerup =

Danish dance teacher

Asta Malthea Mollerup (22 May 1881 – 25 September 1945) was a Danish dance teacher who was one of the first to introduce the Danes to modern dance, a new trend which was inspired by the American dancer Isadora Duncan and the German choreographer Mary Wigman. From 1914, she ran her own dancing school for children in Copenhagen and in 1927 she founded the Asta Mollerup School for Female Dancers (Asta Mollerup Danserindeskolen). Apart from the Royal Danish Academy of Music, it was Denmark's only dancing school.

== Biography ==
Born on 22 May 1881 in Copenhagen, Asta Malthea Mollerup was the daughter of the museum director Arthur Julius William Mollerup (1846–1917) and Caroline Susanne Ewald Rothe (1853–1938). She was initially trained as a dancer by a Russian ballet master in Oslo. On returning to Copenhagen in 1914, she opened a ballet and rhythmic dance school for children and young adults. Until 1925, she also taught gymnastics and dance at Marie Mørk's School in Hillerød and at I. Ingwersen & H. Ellbrecht's School in Copenhagen.

During this period, she continued her training as a dancer spending periods with Duncan and the Russian dancer Lyubov Yegorova in Paris and Wigman in Dresden. Her own courses developed from a foundation in classical ballet to far more expressive choreography based on trends in modern dance.

The school she opened in 1927 (Danserindeskolen) was very special in that it not only taught dance with special attention to anatomy, Mensendieck gymnastics, history of dance, music, costumes and scenography, but covered the normal school curriculum with Danish, German, French, English, maths, geography and cultural history. Every two years the pupils displayed their skills, sometimes also appearing on the stages of Copenhagen and the provinces. For her attention to French language and culture, Mollerup was awarded the Ordre des Palmes Académiques.

The school continued to prosper, especially in the 1930s. Among its students were the actress Lilian Ellis, the dancers Bodil Genkel and Else Knipschildt, and the ballerina Nini Theilade. Asta Mollerup's niece Mette Mollerup (1931–1983) also attended the school.

Asta Mollerup died in Copenhagen on 25 September 1945. She is buried in Taarbæk Cemetery.
