= Mona Vangsaae =

Danish ballet dancer, choreographer and instructor

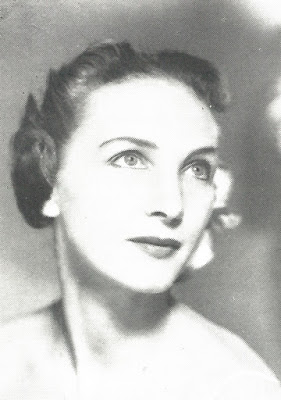
- Mona Vangsaae (1957)
- Born: Mona Elly Hou Vangsaae; 29 April 1920; Copenhagen , Denmark
- Died: 17 May 1983 (aged 63); Copenhagen , Denmark
- Other names: Danish
- Education: Royal Danish Theatre ballet school
- Occupation(s): ballet dancer, choreographer, instructor
- Years active: 1938–1962 (dancer); 1962–1980s (choreographer)
- Known for: Royal Danish Theatre soloist; co-director, Danish Dance Academy
- Notable work: Spektrum, Et Nodeblad
- Spouse(s): Børge Angelo Jahncke (m.1942), Frank Schaufuss (m.1946)
- Children: Liselotte Jahncke, Peter Schaufuss
- Parents: Albert Carl Hou Vangsaae (father); Boline Vilhelmine Elise Kappen Andersen (mother)
- Awards: knight, Order of the Dannebrog

Mona Elly Hou Vangsaae (29 April 1920 – 17 May 1983) was a Danish ballet dancer, choreographer and instructor. At the Royal Danish Theatre, thanks to her excellent technique and dramatic versatility she became a soloist in 1942, taking roles in Bournonville's productions and in works by the Danish choreographers Nini Theilade and Harald Lander. The roles of Julie in Frederick Ashton's Romeo and Juliet and Aili in Birgit Cullberg's The Moon Reindeer were created for her. After retiring from the stage in 1962, she became an instructor for Bournonville's ballets together with her son Peter Schaufuss.

== Biography ==
Born in Copenhagen on 29 April 1920, Mona Elly Hou Vangsaae was the daughter of the shoe maker Albert Carl Hou Vangsaae (1896–1981) and Boline Vilhelmine Elise Kappen Andersen (1898–1971). She married twice, first in 1942 with the hairdresser Børge Angelo Jahncke (1911–1975) and then in 1946 with the principal dancer and ballet master Frank Schaufuss (1921–1997). She had two children: Liselotte (1943) and Peter (1949) who became an artistic director.

Vangsaae attended the ballet school at the Royal Danish Theatre from the age of six. She was trained in the Bournonville tradition by Valborg Borchsenius and Harald Lander. She found the training hard work but slowly became accustomed to performing on stage. She joined the Royal Theatre company in 1938 and became a soloist in 1942. After taking a number of small roles, she performed Teresina in Bounonville's Napoli and the señorita in La Ventana but it was not until 1948 that she reached her peak, performing the street dancer in Léonide Massine's Le Beau Danube. She went on to perform as the woman in Metaphor by Nini Theilade in 1950 and in 1955 the cocotte in George Balanchine's La sonnambula. She was particularly effective as Aili in Birgit Cullberg's The Moon Reindeer in 1957.

On retiring from the stage in 1962, together with her former husband Frank Schaufuss she was co-director of the Danish Dance Academy (Det danske ballet akademi) at Det Ny Teater until 1974. As a choreographer, in 1958 she created both Spektrum and the Mozart-based work Et Nodeblad. She was particularly successful from 1971 to 1973 with her production of Bounonville's Le Conservatoire for the London Festival Ballet. In the late 1970s and early 1980s, she helped her son Peter with productions of La Sylphide and Napoli in Toronto, Marseille, Stuttgart and Berlin. She later taught girls at London's Royal Ballet School until a month before she died.

Mona Vangsaae died in Copenhagen on 17 May 1983.

== Awards and honours ==
Vangsaae was honoured as a knight of the Order of the Dannebrog in 1953.
