= King of Burlesque =

1936 film by Sidney Lanfield

- Directed by: Sidney Lanfield
- Screenplay by: James Seymour; Gene Markey; Harry Tugend
- Story by: Viña Delmar
- Produced by: Kenneth Macgowan (associate producer)
- Starring: Warner Baxter; Alice Faye; Jack Oakie
- Cinematography: J. Peverell Marley
- Edited by: Ralph Dietrich
- Music by: Cyril J. Mockridge (original music) (uncredited); Victor Baravalle (musical director); Herbert W. Spencer (orchestrator) (uncredited); Vinton Vernon (music recordist) (uncredited) Pollack & Yellen
- Distributed by: 20th Century Fox
- Release date: January 3, 1936
- Running time: 90 minutes
- Country: United States
- Language: English
- Box office: $1.1 million

King of Burlesque is a 1936 American musical film directed by Sidney Lanfield and starring Warner Baxter, Alice Faye and Jack Oakie. It is about a former burlesque producer played by Baxter who moves into a legitimate theatre and does very well, until he marries a socialite. Sammy Lee received an Academy Award nomination for the now dead category of Best Dance Direction at the 8th Academy Awards. Today the film is best known for Fats Waller's rendition of "I've Got My Fingers Crossed".

== Plot ==
Former burlesque producer moves into legitimate theatre and does well until he marries a socialite. After his divorce his former top singer returns from London to help out.

== Cast ==
- Warner Baxter as Kerry Bolton
- Alice Faye as Pat Doran
- Jack Oakie as Joe Cooney
- Mona Barrie as Rosalind Cleve
- Arline Judge as Connie
- Dixie Dunbar as Marie
- Gregory Ratoff as Kolpolpeck
- Herbert Mundin as English Impresario
- Fats Waller as Ben
- Nick Long Jr. as Anthony Lamb
- Kenny Baker as Arthur
- Charles Quigley as Stanley Drake
- Paxton Sisters as Specialty Dancers
- Al Shaw as Lew Henkle (as Shaw)
- Sam Lee as Gus Keefe (as Lee)
- Andrew Tombes as Slattery
- Shirley Deane as Phyllis Sears
- Harry 'Zoup' Welsh as 'Spud' La Rue (as Harry 'Zoop' Welch)
- Claudia Coleman as Belle Weaver
- Ellen Lowe as Miss Meredith (as Ellen E. Lowe)
- Herbert Ashley as Jake - Bolton's Chauffeur
- Jerry Mandy as Frankie
- Keye Luke as Wong
- Gareth Joplin as Speedy - the Bootblack
- Lynn Bari as Dancer (uncredited)
- Cyril Ring as Auctioneer's Assistant (uncredited)
- Marjorie Weaver as Dancer (uncredited)
- Jane Wyman as Dancer (uncredited)

== Critical reception ==
Frank Nugent of The New York Times wrote that the film benefited from a "cleverly written script, a handful of amiable and talented performers, some catchy melodies and a series of comparatively restrained (for Hollywood) song and dance sequences. If you are willing to overlook the antiquity of the fabric and concentrate on its trimmings, King of Burlesque, the new film at the Center Theatre, may be set down as one of the screen's more entertaining ventures in the musical comedy line."

Variety wrote that the film "is a first rate musical in all departments except story, but the production elements managed to keep two steps ahead of the uninspired theme … through sightly staging, catchy music, a clever cast and shrewd dialogue … the picture has plenty in its favour." The reviewer stated that Jack Oakie "is stronger than usual … and makes off with the picture", Warner Baxter plays a role that is "getting to be stock for him", and Alice Faye "sings satisfactorily and looks well."

== Remake ==
The film was remade in 1943 as Hello, Frisco, Hello.
