= Dixie Dunbar =

American actress (1919–1991)

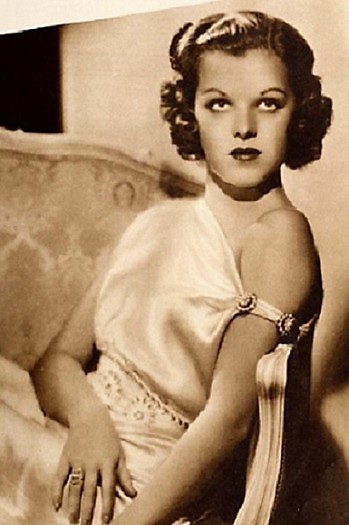
- Born: Christina Elizabeth Dunbar; January 19, 1919; Montgomery, Alabama, U.S.
- Died: August 29, 1991 (aged 72); Miami Beach, Florida, U.S.
- Occupations: Actress, singer
- Years active: 1934–1938
- Spouse(s): Gene Snyder (m. 1941; div. 1952); Robert M. Herndon (m. 1954; div. 1957); Jack L. King (m. 1958; died 1979)

Christina Elizabeth "Dixie" Dunbar (January 19, 1919 – August 29, 1991) was an American singer, film actress, and dancer.

== Early life and career ==
Born in Montgomery, Alabama, Dunbar grew up in Atlanta, Georgia. She began studying dancing as a child and went on to sing and dance in nightclubs.

In 1934, she was Ray Bolger's dancing partner in the revue Life Begins at 8:40, which was staged in Boston. She also performed in that show on Broadway in 1934-35 and the Broadway productions of Yokel Boy (1939–40) and George White's Scandals (1934).

Dunbar's film debut also came in George White's Scandals (1934). During the 1930s she appeared in a number of Twentieth Century Fox films, including two Jones Family films.

After she left Broadway and films, she returned to nightclubs, performing for a while before she retired. In the early 1950s, she performed in television commercials for Old Gold cigarettes, dancing enclosed in a representation of a cigarette pack with only her legs visible.

== Personal life and death ==
Dunbar married three times: to choreographer Gene Snyder from 1941 to 1952, to Robert M. Herndon from 1954 to 1957, and to Jack L. King from October 1958 until his death.

She died on August 29, 1991, in Miami Beach, Florida, aged 72. She had had a series of heart attacks.

== Selected filmography ==
- George White's Scandals (1934)
- Educating Father (1936)
- Sing, Baby, Sing (1936)
- One in a Million (1936)
- King of Burlesque (1936)
- Girls' Dormitory (1936)
- Pigskin Parade (1936)
- Sing and Be Happy (1937)
- Walking Down Broadway (1938)
- Rebecca of Sunnybrook Farm (1938)
- Alexander's Ragtime Band (1938)
