= Going Spanish =

- Film poster
- Directed by: Al Christie
- Written by: Arthur L. Jarrett; William Watson
- Produced by: Al Christie; E. W. Hammons
- Starring: Bob Hope; Leah Ray; Frances Halliday
- Cinematography: George Webber
- Music by: Johnny Burke; Harold Spina
- Production company: Educational Pictures
- Distributed by: Fox Film Corporation
- Release date: March 2, 1934
- Running time: 19 minutes 11 minutes (Turner Classic Movies print and edited version)
- Country: United States
- Language: English

Going Spanish is a 1934 American short comedy film featuring the film debut of Bob Hope and directed by Al Christie. The short comedy co-stars Leah Ray and Jules Epailly. Released by Educational Pictures, the film premiered on March 2, 1934. It was re-cut and released as Bob's Busy Day by Comedy House in 1942.

== Plot ==
While on vacation in an unnamed South American nation, Bob (Bob Hope) passes through the village of Los Pochos Eggos. His car collides with that of the mayor of the village. The mayor becomes enraged and he begins tearing Bob's car to pieces. Bob retaliates and takes his car apart as well.

According to the village tradition, on one day each year, any crime is forgiven provided that the criminal sing a song afterward. Bob could have been arrested, but instead he happened to appear in town on the appropriate day. Later in the film, Bob woos Senorita (Leah Ray) and begins to make the mayor jealous. Each time an offense is committed, the mayor declares "This means war."

== Cast ==
- Bob Hope as Bob
- Leah Ray as Senorita
- Frances Halliday as Mother
- Jules Epailly as Mayor of Los Pochos Eggos
- Vicki Cummings as Bob's Girl
- William Edmunds as Gaucho
- Godoy's Argentine Band as Musical Ensemble

== Reception ==
The film was unsuccessful and was panned by critics. Shortly after it was released, the bank robber John Dillinger was at large. Hope told Walter Winchell that he had starred in the film and then added "When they catch Dillinger, they're going to make him sit through it twice."

After Hope made this comment, Christie and Educational terminated Hope's contract. Hope then starred in his second and third short films, Soup for Nuts (Universal Studios, 9 July 1934) and Paree, Paree (Warner Brothers, 8 September 1934).
