= William Edmunds (actor) =

Italian-American actor (1886–1981)

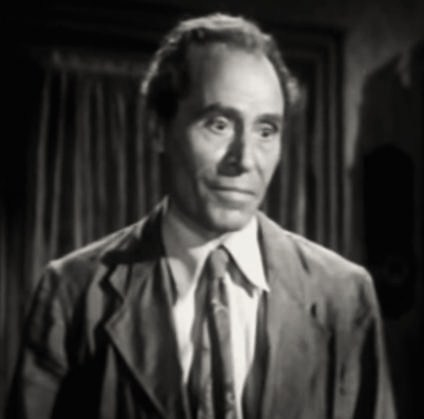
- Edmunds in Swamp Fire (1946)
- Born: Michele Giuseppe Pellegrino; September 18, 1883; San Fele, Kingdom of Italy
- Died: December 7, 1981 (aged 98); Los Angeles, California, U.S.
- Occupation: Actor
- Years active: 1910–1959

William Edmunds (Michele Giuseppe Pellegrino; September 18, 1883 – December 7, 1981) was an Italian-American stage and screen character actor, typically playing roles with heavy accents (generally Italian, Spanish, and French), where he is best remembered to cinematic audiences as Mr. Giuseppe Martini in It's a Wonderful Life.

== Early life ==
Born the son of Donato Antonio Pellegrino and Maria Giovanna Ricigliano in San Fele, in the Italian region of Basilicata, he was christened Michele Frondino Pellegrino. He emigrated to the United States with his parents and siblings on the S/S Britannia, which sailed from Naples, Italy, and arrived at the Port of New York in April 1897. As an adult, he became an actor on the New York stage.

== Career ==
He received his first credited role in motion pictures in the Bob Hope vehicle Going Spanish (1934). He relocated to Hollywood in 1938 and had bit parts in films such as Idiot's Delight (1939), and larger roles such as House of Frankenstein (1944, as gypsy leader Fejos), Bob Hope's Where There's Life (1947, as King Hubertus II) and Double Dynamite (1951, as Groucho Marx's long-suffering boss). His many short subject appearances include a few stints as Robert "Mickey" Blake's father in the Our Gang series. He has a brief appearance in Casablanca (1942) where in Rick's Café he gives instructions to a man seeking illegal passage out of Casablanca.

Edmunds was cast with James Stewart in three films, The Mortal Storm, The Shop Around the Corner (1940), and perhaps his signature role as Mr. Martini, the bar proprietor in It's a Wonderful Life. He had other notable parts in For Whom the Bell Tolls (1943), The Three Musketeers (1948), and The Caddy (1953), a Dean Martin and Jerry Lewis comedy. Edmunds received top billing in the 1951 TV situation comedy Actors' Hotel.

He acted on Broadway in such plays as The New York Story and Follies, which he left to be in It's a Wonderful Life. Additional stage credits include Salt Water (1929–1930), Saluta (1934), Moon Over Mulberry Street (1935–1936), and Siege (1937).

== Death ==
Edmunds died in Los Angeles, California, at age 98. He was cremated and his ashes were scattered at sea.

== Filmography ==
- Going Spanish (1934 short) as Gaucho
- Shadow of Doubt (1935) as Butler (uncredited)
- Angels with Dirty Faces (1938) as Italian Storekeeper (uncredited)
- Idiot's Delight (1939) as Dumptsy
- Fixer Dugan (1939) as Smiley
- Juarez (1939) as Italian Minister (scenes deleted)
- Nurse Edith Cavell (1939) as Albert
- The Rains Came (1939) as Mr. Das
- Geronimo (1939) as Scout (uncredited)
- Everything Happens at Night (1939) as Hotel Clerk
- The Shop Around the Corner (1940) as Waiter (uncredited)
- He Married His Wife (1940) as Waiter
- Know Your Money (1940 short) as Samuel 'The Dutchman' Welker
- Strange Cargo (1940) as Watchman (uncredited)
- Earthbound (1940) as Chris (uncredited)
- The Mortal Storm (1940) as Lehman
- Anne of Windy Poplars (1940) as Train Conductor (uncredited)
- The Great McGinty (1940) as Poll Watcher at Gymnasium (uncredited)
- Stranger on the Third Floor (1940) as Gardener (uncredited)
- Girl from Havana (1940) as Ricco, the Bartender
- Slightly Tempted (1940) as Quimby (uncredited)
- Escape (1940) as White Swan Inn Waiter (uncredited)
- The Mark of Zorro (1940) as Peón selling cocks (uncredited)
- Girls Under 21 (1940) as Tony Mangione
- Mr. & Mrs. Smith (1941) as Proprietor Lucy's
- Baby Blues (1941 short) as Mr. Gubitosi (uncredited)
- Knockout (1941) as Louis Grinnelli
- Barnacle Bill (1941) as Joe Petillo
- The People vs. Dr. Kildare (1941) as Sven Bergstrom (uncredited)
- A Woman's Face (1941) as Courtroom Spectator (uncredited)
- A Very Young Lady (1941) as Abner (uncredited)
- They Met in Bombay (1941) as Hotel Barber (uncredited)
- Man at Large (1941) as Otto Kisling
- Unholy Partners (1941) as Pop, Night Watchman (uncredited)
- Paris Calling (1941) as Prof. Marceau
- The Wife Takes a Flyer (1942) as Gustav
- Juke Girl (1942) as Travitti, Atlanta Produce Dealer (uncredited)
- The Big Shot (1942) as Sarto
- The Pied Piper (1942) as Frenchman
- Crossroads (1942) as Driver (uncredited)
- Berlin Correspondent (1942) as Hans Gruber
- Casablanca (1942) as Second Contact Man at Rick's (uncredited)
- The Black Swan (1942) as Town Crier (uncredited)
- Reunion in France (1942) as Horse and Buggy Taxicab Driver (uncredited)
- Assignment in Brittany (1943) as Plehec
- Tonight We Raid Calais (1943) as Bell Ringer
- Edge of Darkness (1943) as Elderly Sailor (uncredited)
- Background to Danger (1943) as Waiter with information (uncredited)
- For Whom the Bell Tolls (1943) as Soldier #1 (uncredited)
- Hostages (1943) as Hostage (uncredited)
- Isle of Forgotten Sins (1943) as Noah, Native Chief
- The Fallen Sparrow (1943) as Papa Lepetino (uncredited)
- There's Something About a Soldier (1943) as Jan Grybinski (uncredited)
- Madame Curie (1943) as Cart Driver (uncredited)
- The Desert Song (1943) as Suliman (uncredited)
- The Seventh Cross (1944) as Aldinger (uncredited)
- Secrets of Scotland Yard (1944) as Isaiah Thom (uncredited)
- Till We Meet Again (1944) as Henri Maret
- The Conspirators (1944) as Blindman vending souvenirs (uncredited)
- The Climax (1944) as Leon, Theater Concierge
- One Body Too Many (1944) as Prof. Hilton (uncredited)
- House of Frankenstein (1944) as Fejos
- Dangerous Passage (1944) as Captain Saul
- A Bell for Adano (1945) as Tomasino, Fisherman (uncredited)
- This Love of Ours (1945) as Jose (uncredited)
- The Well-Groomed Bride (1946) as Mr. Whortle (uncredited)
- Anna and the King of Siam (1946) as Moonshee (uncredited)
- Swamp Fire (1946) as Emile Ledoux
- Nobody Lives Forever (1946) as Mission Priest (uncredited)
- It's a Wonderful Life (1946) as Mr. Giuseppe Martini
- The Beast with Five Fingers (1946) as Antonio
- The Man I Love (1947) as Uncle Tony Toresca (uncredited)
- Carnival in Costa Rica (1947) as Felipe (uncredited)
- The Long Night (1947) as Man in Crowd (uncredited)
- High Conquest (1947) as Train Conductor (uncredited)
- That Hagen Girl (1947) as Corey, Butler / Chauffeur (uncredited)
- The Lost Moment (1947) as Vittorio
- Where There's Life (1947) as King Hubertus II
- 13 Lead Soldiers (1948) as Prager, Antique Dealer (uncredited)
- The Pirate (1948) as Town Clerk (uncredited)
- The Three Musketeers (1948) as Innkeeper, Landlord (uncredited)
- The Big Sombrero (1949) as Don Luis Alvarado
- A Kiss in the Dark (1949) as Kummel (uncredited)
- Any Number Can Play (1949) as Men's Room Attendant (uncredited)
- Ringside (1949) as Prof. Berger
- Mr. Soft Touch (1949) as Alex, Janitor (uncredited)
- The Lawless (1950) as Mr. Jensen
- Double Dynamite (1951) as Mr. Baganucci
- Actors Hotel (1951 TV series) as Carlo Corelli
- The Caddy (1953) as Caminello
- The Walter Winchell File (1958 TV series) as Giovanni Mancuso
- 77 Sunset Strip (1959 TV series) as Papa Puccini (final appearance)
