= Dave Gould =

American choreographer (1899–1969)

Dave Gould

Dave Gould (born Dezső Guttmann; March 11, 1899 – June 3, 1969) was a Hungarian-American choreographer and dance director. He is notable as one of the three people to win the short-lived Academy Award for Best Dance Direction.

== Early life ==
He was born to a Jewish family in Kiscigánd, formerly in Austro-Hungarian Empire, now in Hungary. In 1923 it merged with Nagycigánd under the name of Cigánd. At the time of his birth, his father was living in New York, and in 1904, he emigrated to America with his mother.

== Career ==
Gould began his career as a Broadway stage choreographer. He won an Academy Award for Dance Direction in 1936 for the “Straw Hat” finale of Folies Bergère de Paris and Broadway Melody's I've Got a Feeling You're Fooling. featuring Maurice Chevalier, Ann Sothern, and Merle Oberon. He was nominated for the remaining two years that the award was given. Gould was an "influential contributor to the use of dance in the MGM musical, however with a lack of training and breadth of knowledge in the dance vocabularies, [his] contribution is easily lost... His work centered on background framing ensuring that focus is not lost from the star of the film." After his early successes, he found work in smaller studios until his retirement. In the 1940s he largely directed short films. He was credited with 39 films as a choreographer and 28 as a director of short films

=== Selected films ===
==== Choreographer ====
- 1932: The Subway Symphony
- 1934: Three on a Honeymoon
- 1935: Folies-Bergère de Paris
- 1937: A Day at the Races (film)
- 1939: Everything's on Ice
- 1940: The Boys from Syracuse (film)
- 1942: Youth on Parade
- 1944: Casanova in Burlesque
- 1949: Fireball Fun for All

==== Director ====
- 1942: Rhythm Parade
- 1944: Yankee Doodle Daughters
- 1945: Here Come the Navy Bands
- 1946: Baby, Are You Kiddin’?
- 1946: Roly Poly
- 1946: Old Chisholm Trail
- 1946: All in Favor Say Aye

== Personal ==
Gould married show girl Mitzi Haynes on April 18, 1937.; they divorced in 1939.
