= A Midsummer Night's Dream (1935 film) =

1935 film by William Dieterle and Max Reinhardt

- Theatrical release poster
- Directed by: Max Reinhardt; William Dieterle
- Screenplay by: Charles Kenyon; Mary C. McCall Jr.
- Based on: A Midsummer Night's Dream; 1600 play by William Shakespeare
- Produced by: Henry Blanke
- Starring: James Cagney; Joe E. Brown; Dick Powell; Jean Muir; Victor Jory; Verree Teasdale; Hugh Herbert; Anita Louise; Frank McHugh; Ross Alexander; Ian Hunter; Mickey Rooney; Olivia de Havilland; Hobart Cavanaugh; Grant Mitchell
- Cinematography: Hal Mohr
- Edited by: Ralph Dawson
- Music by: Felix Mendelssohn (re-orchestrated by Erich Wolfgang Korngold)
- Production company: Warner Bros. Pictures
- Distributed by: Warner Bros. Pictures
- Release date: October 9, 1935
- Running time: 133 minutes 143 minutes (with Overture and Exit Music)
- Country: United States
- Language: English
- Budget: $981,000
- Box office: $1.2 million

A Midsummer Night's Dream is a 1935 American romantic comedy film adaptation of the Shakespearean play of the same name. It is directed by Max Reinhardt and William Dieterle, produced by Warner Bros. Pictures, and stars James Cagney, Mickey Rooney, Olivia de Havilland (in her film debut), Jean Muir, Joe E. Brown, Dick Powell, Ross Alexander, Anita Louise, Victor Jory and Ian Hunter. The screenplay, written by Charles Kenyon and Mary C. McCall Jr., is adapted from Reinhardt's Hollywood Bowl production of the play from the previous year.

Felix Mendelssohn's music was extensively used, as re-orchestrated by Erich Wolfgang Korngold. The ballet sequences featuring the fairies were choreographed by Ballets Russes veteran Bronislava Nijinska.

The film opened on October 9, 1935. It initially received mixed reviews and was a financial failure, but retrospective reviews have been far more positive, and it is considered one of the best film versions of Shakespeare's play.

== Plot ==
Act One

A beautiful young woman named Hermia is in love with Lysander and wishes to marry him. Her father Egeus, however, has instructed her to marry Demetrius, whom he has chosen for her. When Hermia refuses to obey, stating she is in love with Lysander, her father invokes before Duke Theseus of Athens an ancient Athenian law that states a daughter must marry the suitor chosen by her father, or face death. Theseus offers her another choice—to live a life of chastity as a nun and worship the goddess Diana.

Meanwhile, Peter Quince and his fellow players gather to produce a stage play about the cruel death of Pyramus and Thisbe in honor of the Duke and his upcoming marriage to Hippolyta. Quince reads the names of characters and assigns them to the players. Nick Bottom, who is playing the main role of Pyramus, is over-enthusiastic and suggests himself for the characters of Thisbe, the Lion, and Pyramus at the same time. He also prefers being a tyrant and recites some lines of Ercles. Quince ends the meeting instructing his players to meet at the Duke's oak tree.

In the forest outside Athens, Oberon, the king of the fairies, and Titania his queen, are having an argument. Titania tells Oberon that she plans to stay there to attend the wedding of Duke Theseus and Hippolyta. Oberon and Titania are estranged: She refuses to give her Indian changeling to Oberon for use as his knight because the child's mother was one of Titania's worshippers. Wanting to punish Titania's disobedience, Oberon instructs his mischievous court jester Puck to retrieve a flower called "love-in-idleness". Originally a white flower, it turns purple when struck by Cupid's bow. When someone applies the magical love potion to a sleeping person's eyelids, it makes the victim fall in love with the first living creature seen upon awakening.

Oberon comes across a sleeping Titania and applies the love potion to her eyes. He intends to make Titania fall in love with the first creature she sees when waking up, which he is sure will be an animal of the forest. Oberon's intent is to shame Titania into giving up the little Indian changeling.

Meanwhile, Hermia and Lysander have escaped to the same forest in hopes of eloping. Demetrius, who is also in love with Hermia, pursues them into the forest. He is followed by Helena, who is desperate to reclaim Demetrius' love. Helena continues to make advances toward Demetrius, promising to love him more than Hermia, but he rebuffs her with cruel insults. When Oberon sees this, he orders Puck to spread some of the love potion on the eyelids of Demetrius. When Puck later discovers the sleeping Lysander, he mistakes him for Demetrius—not having seen either before—and administers the love potion to the sleeping Lysander.

During the night, Helena comes across the sleeping Lysander and wakes him up while attempting to determine whether he is dead or asleep. When he lays eyes on her, Lysander immediately falls in love with Helena. Meanwhile, the mischievous Puck turns Bottom into a donkey (from the neck up). When Titania wakes up and lays eyes on Bottom as a donkey, she falls in love with him. Oberon finds the abandoned changeling and takes him away.

Act Two

When Oberon sees Demetrius still following Hermia, he instructs Puck to bring Helena to him while he applies the love potion to the sleeping Demetrius' eyes. Upon waking up, Demetrius sees Helena, and now both Lysander and Demetrius are in love with Helena, who is convinced that her two suitors are simply mocking her. When Hermia encounters Helena with her two suitors, she accuses Helena of stealing Lysander away from her. The four quarrel with each other until Lysander and Demetrius become so enraged that they seek a place to duel each other to prove whose love for Helena is the greatest. Oberon orders Puck to keep Lysander and Demetrius from catching up with one another and to remove the charm from Lysander. After Puck applies the potion to the sleeping Lysander's eyes, he returns to loving Hermia, while Demetrius continues to love Helena. And Titania is still in love with the donkey-headed Bottom.

Oberon leads all the fairies away with the changeling at his side. Having achieved his goals, Oberon releases Titania from her spell and they leave together in love once again. Following Oberon's instructions, Puck removes the donkey's head from Bottom, and arranges everything so that Hermia, Lysander, Demetrius, and Helena all believe that they have been dreaming when they awaken. Together they return from the forest to attend the wedding of Duke Theseus and Hippolyta. When Theseus sees Hermia and her father Egeus, and seeing that Demetrius does not love Hermia any more, Theseus overrules Egeus's demands and arranges a group wedding—Hermia to marry Lysander, and Helena to marry Demetrius. The lovers decide that the previous night's events must have been a dream.

That night at the wedding, they all watch Bottom and his fellow players perform Pyramus and Thisbe. Unprepared as they are, the performers are so terrible playing their roles that the guests laugh as if it were meant to be a comedy. Before the encore, the guests sneak away and retire to bed. Afterwards, Oberon, Titania, Puck, and the other fairies enter, and bless the house and its occupants with good fortune. After everyone leaves, Puck suggests to the audience that what they just experienced might be nothing but a dream.

== Cast ==
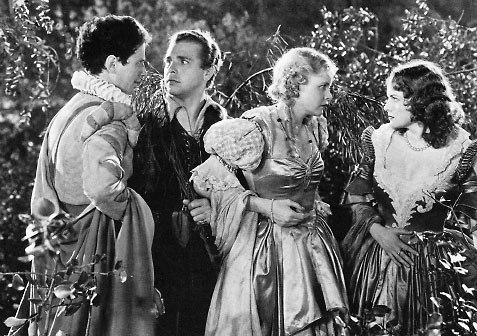
Left to right: Ross Alexander, Dick Powell, Jean Muir and Olivia de Havilland

The Athenian Court

- Ian Hunter as Theseus, Duke of Athens
- Verree Teasdale as Hippolyta, Queen of the Amazons, betrothed to Theseus
- Hobart Cavanaugh as Philostrate, Master of Revels to Theseus
- Dick Powell as Lysander, In love with Hermia
- Ross Alexander as Demetrius, In love with Hermia
- Olivia de Havilland as Hermia, In love with Lysander
- Jean Muir as Helena, In love with Demetrius
- Grant Mitchell as Egeus, Father to Hermia

The Players

- Frank McHugh as Quince, the Carpenter
- Dewey Robinson as Snug, the Joiner
- James Cagney as Bottom, the Weaver
- Joe E. Brown as Flute, the Bellows-mender
- Hugh Herbert as Snout, the Tinker
- Otis Harlan as Starveling, the Tailor
- Arthur Treacher as Epilogue

The Fairies

- Victor Jory as Oberon, King of the Fairies
- Anita Louise as Titania, Queen of the Fairies (Carol Ellis: singing voice)
- Nini Theilade as Fairie, Attending Titania (as Nina Theilade)
- Mickey Rooney as Puck
- Katherine Frey as Pease-Blossom
- Helen Westcott as Cobweb
- Fred Sale as Moth
- Billy Barty as Mustard-Seed
- Margaret Kerry as a fairy (as Peggy Lynch)

== Background ==
At the time of production, legendary avante garde stage director Max Reinhardt had just arrived in the United States as a refugee from the imminent Nazi takeover of Austria. His arrival in America followed a long and distinguished career, "inspired by the example of social participation in the ancient Greek and Medieval theatres", of seeking "to bridge the separation between actors and audiences".

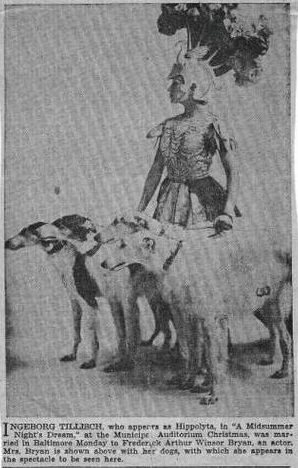
Ingeborg Tillisch in costume as Hippolyta

=== 1934 Hollywood Bowl production ===
Reinhardt previously directed an acclaimed, lavish staging of A Midsummer Night's Dream at the Hollywood Bowl. According to the Los Angeles Times, the production operated "on the scale of a small military operation, the production featured an ensemble of more than 400 artists, including 18 principals, 60 or so dancers and several hundred extras. The Bowl was reconfigured for the occasion. The band shell was dismantled and put in storage. A gigantic stage was built and covered with green sod, heavy foliage and oak trees shipped in from Calabasas."

The production used Felix Mendelssohn's music composed for the play, with ballet sequences choreographed by Theodore Kosloff and Nini Theilade. Costumes were designed by Max Rée. The opening cast featured Mickey Rooney (Puck), Olivia de Havilland (Hermia), John Lodge (Theseus), Jacqueline de Wit (Hippolyta), William Farnum (Egeus), William Henry (Lysander), George Walcott (Demetrius), Evelyn Venable (Helena), Philip Arnhold (Oberon), and Leif Erickson (Philostrate). De Havilland was originally an understudy for Gloria Stuart, who dropped out before opening night due to illness.

== Production ==
=== Casting ===
Many of the actors in this version never had performed Shakespeare and would not do so again, especially Cagney and Brown, who were nevertheless highly acclaimed for their performances. Many critics agreed that Dick Powell was miscast as Lysander, and Powell concurred with the critics' verdict.

Although the cast of the stage play was mostly replaced by Warner Brothers contract players, de Havilland and Mickey Rooney were chosen to reprise their original roles. This was de Havilland's motion picture debut.

Avant-garde director Kenneth Anger claimed in his book Hollywood Babylon II to have played the changeling prince in this film when he was a child, but in fact the role was played by child actress Sheila Brown.

=== Filming ===
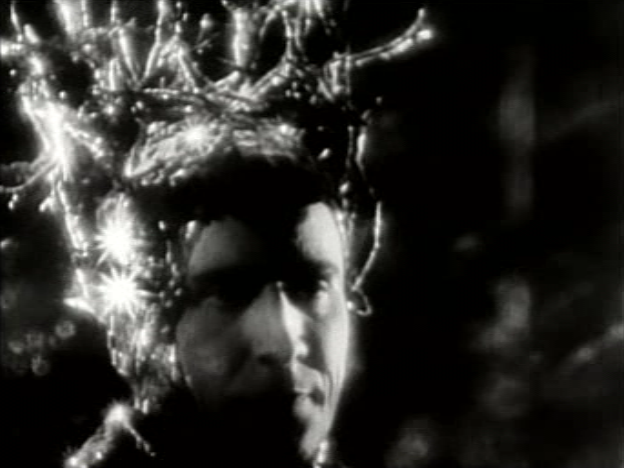
Victor Jory as Oberon in an outtake

Max Reinhardt did not speak English at the time of the film's production. He instead gave orders to the actors and crew in Austrian German while fellow refugee and longtime Reinhardt collaborator William Dieterle acted as his interpreter.

The shooting schedule had to be rearranged after Mickey Rooney broke his leg while tobogganing at Big Pines, California. Since the production was too expensive to be delayed, Rooney's remaining scenes had to be shot with a stand-in, George Breakston, for the running and elfin sequences. Foliage had to be used to conceal his broken leg, as well as holes in the floor to complete Rooney's scenes. According to Rooney's memoirs, Jack L. Warner was furious and said he wanted to kill Rooney, bring him back to life, and then break his other leg.

The relatively new material cellophane was used in ample amounts for the 1935 film—700,000 yards—to create the illusion of fairyland.

== Release and distribution ==
The film opened worldwide on October 9, 1935 in London, New York, Sydney and Vienna.

=== Cancellations ===
At the time, cinemas entered into a contract to show the film, but had the right to pull out within a specified period of time. Cancellations usually ran between 20 and 50. The film established a new record with 2,971 cancellations. Booking agents had failed to correctly identify the film.

=== Run times ===
The film was first released at 133 minutes, but was edited to 118 minutes for its general release run. The full 133 minute version was not seen again until it was shown on cable television in 1994. The film was then reissued at its full length on VHS (its first video release was of the edited version). Later showings on Turner Classic Movies have restored the film's pre-credits Overture and its Exit Music, neither of which had been heard since its 1935 road show presentations. In August 2007, it was released on DVD for the first time, both individually and as part of a box set known as The Shakespeare Collection.

== Critical response ==
The film failed at the box office and received mixed reviews, with the cinematography, the use of Mendelssohn's music, and the dance sequences being highly praised. Although James Cagney was acclaimed for his performance, Warner Bros. was criticized by film critic Richard Watts Jr. for "weakening" enough to cast an actor "whose performance is not much short of fatal", referring to box-office favorite Dick Powell, then in his "Hollywood crooner" phase, who reportedly realized he was completely wrong for the role of Lysander and asked to be taken off the film, to no avail.

The film was banned by the Ministry of Propaganda in an infamous example of censorship in Nazi Germany. This was due not only to Joseph Goebbels's belief that the filmmaking style, which drew heavily upon German expressionist cinema, was degenerate art, but even more so due to the Jewish ancestry of director Max Reinhardt. For precisely the same reason, everything by Classical music composer Felix Mendelssohn and soundtrack arranger Erich Wolfgang Korngold had already been banned by Goebbels Ministry as allegedly degenerate music.

The reviewer for Variety wrote of the film: "Question of whether a Shakespearean play can be successfully produced on a lavish scale for the films is affirmatively answered by this commendable effort. (...) The fantasy, the ballets of the Oberon and Titania cohorts, and the characters in the eerie sequences are convincing and illusion compelling. Film is replete with enchanting scenes, beautifully photographed and charmingly presented. All Shakespearian devotees will be pleased at the soothing treatment given to the Mendelssohn score. (...) The women are uniformly better than the men. They get more from their lines. The selection of Dick Powell to play Lysander was unfortunate. He never seems to catch the spirit of the play or role. And Mickey Rooney, as Puck, is so intent on being cute that he becomes almost annoying. There are some outstanding performances, however, notably Victor Jory as Oberon. His clear, distinct diction indicates what can be done by careful recitation and good recording; Olivia de Havilland, as Hermia, is a fine artist here; others are Jean Muir, Verree Teasdale and Anita Louise, the latter beautiful as Titania but occasionally indistinct in her lines."

In The New York Times, Andre Sennwald wrote that the film was "no masterpiece" but a "brave, beautiful and interesting effort" with "magical moments when it all comes alive," praising its "high ambitions and unflagging interest... a credit to Warner Brothers and the motion picture industry." He praised Korngold's "magnificent" score and Dieterle's direction as "enormously skillful in executing a narrative counterpoint for the four distinct situations," but was critical of the ballets, the goblins, and the "clever mechanical tricks" such as the visible wire suspending Puck in space." Sennwald also praised the clowns, writing that Brown's was "the best performance in the show" and calling Herbert and McHugh "uproarious." Rooney's "remarkable" Puck was "one of the major delights of the work," but Cagney was "too dynamic" to play the "dullard" Bottom, and the "earnest sobriety" of Jory's Oberon "scarcely seems appropriate" to the "antic" fairy king.

Writing for The Spectator in 1935, Graham Greene discussed the mixed contemporary reviews of the film and claimed for himself that he had enjoyed the film - something Greene speculated might be attributed to his lack of affection for the play. He characterized the acting as "fresh and vivid" due to its lack of "proper Shakespearian diction and bearing"; however, he criticized the film's direction, noting that Reinhardt seemed "uncertain of his new medium" and that "much of the production is poised [...] on the edge of absurdity because Herr Reinhardt cannot visualize how his ideas will work out on the screen".

Today, the film gets mostly good reviews. Emanuel Levy praised it as "[b]old and impressive." As of September 22, 2020, Reinhardt's A Midsummer Night's Dream holds a 91% rating on Rotten Tomatoes, based on eight reviews.

== Awards and honors ==
The film won two Academy Awards:

- Best Cinematography - Hal Mohr
- Best Film Editing - Ralph Dawson

It was nominated for:

- Best Picture - Henry Blanke, producer
- Best Assistant Director - Sherry Shourds

Hal Mohr was not nominated for his work on the movie; he won the Oscar thanks to a grass-roots write-in campaign. It was Mohr who decided that the trees should be sprayed with orange paint, giving them the eerie glow that added to the "fairyland" effect in the film. The next year, the Academy of Motion Picture Arts and Sciences declared that it would no longer accept write-in votes for the awards.

== Music ==
Felix Mendelssohn's music was used, but re-orchestrated by Erich Wolfgang Korngold. Not all of it was from the incidental music that Mendelssohn had composed for A Midsummer Night's Dream in 1843. Other pieces used were excerpts from the Symphony No. 3 Scottish, the Symphony No. 4 Italian, and the Songs without Words, among others.

== Legacy ==
A Midsummer Night's Dream was a big influence in Lucile Hadžihalilović's film The Ice Tower (2025). Such as the film's artwork, the scenery, costumes, and lightning. The costumes used in the film also inspired the dress worn by the Snow Queen in The Ice Tower.

== Shakespeare in Hollywood ==
Originally commissioned by the Royal Shakespeare Company, American playwright Ken Ludwig's play, Shakespeare in Hollywood, had its world premiere in September 2004 at Arena Stage in Washington, D.C. It won the Helen Hayes Award for Best New Play. Oberon and Puck are magically transported to 1934 Hollywood and become embroiled—and cast—in the troubled production of this film. "Real" characters in the cast include Jack Warner, Max Reinhardt, Will Hays, Joe E. Brown, and Jimmy Cagney. "When the enchantment of the silver screen meets the magic of Fairyland, all merry hell breaks loose, and we are treated to transformations, chase scenes, and the kind of havoc that only that certain love-juice can wreak. Shakespeare in Hollywood is a supernatural screwball romp, full of entertainment, and even a little bit of education."
