= Leah Ray =

American singer and actress from Norfolk, VA

- Born: Leah Ray Hubbard; February 16, 1915; Norfolk, Virginia, U.S.
- Died: May 27, 1999 (aged 84); Rumson, New Jersey, U.S.
- Occupations: Singer and actress

Leah Ray Hubbard (February 16, 1915 – May 27, 1999) was an American singer and actress born in Norfolk, Virginia. She sang with major dance bands and acted in more than a dozen motion pictures.

== Big-band vocalist ==
Soon after Ray moved to California, her uncle introduced her to Phil Harris and arranged for a tryout. As a result, she was singing for the Harris orchestra at age 16. She also sang with Tommy Dorsey's orchestra.

== Films ==
Leah Ray's screen debut came in 1934, co-starring with Bob Hope in his own screen debut, the musical-comedy short subject Going Spanish (1934). The film was produced in New York by Educational Pictures and distributed by Twentieth Century-Fox. Fox signed Ray for feature films, including One in a Million (1936)., The Holy Terror (1937), Wake Up and Live (1937), and (co-starring with Tony Martin) Sing and Be Happy (1937).

In a situation described in a newspaper article as "extraordinary," Ray's mother (also named Leah Ray Hubbard) was her daughter's stand-in, "working with her in all her pictures."

== Personal life ==
While singing with the Phil Harris orchestra, Leah Ray met Music Corporation of America executive Sonny Werblin. They married on March 27, 1938, and had three sons: Robert, Thomas, and Hubbard. The Werblins were married for more than 50 years until his death in 1991. She and her husband established the David and Leah Ray Werblin Foundation that provided financial support for Rutgers University, charitable causes, and cultural activities.

== Thoroughbred racing ==
Sonny Werblin was a shareholder and director of Monmouth Park Racetrack and builder of the Meadowlands Sports Complex, which included a horse racing venue. Leah Ray Werblin and her husband raced Thoroughbred horses under the nom de course, Elberon Farm. Among their racing successes, their colt, Silent Screen, was voted the 1969 American Champion Two-Year-Old Colt.

Leah Ray Werblin died on May 27, 1999, at her home in Rumson, New Jersey at the age of 82.

== Sources ==
- Leah Ray at IMDb
- June 4, 1999 New York Times obituary for Leah Ray Werblin
