= Bobby Connolly =

American film director and choreographer

William Harold "Bobby" Connolly (July 4, 1897 – February 29, 1944) was an American choreographer and director, first for Broadway musicals and then for films.

Connolly was nominated for three Academy Awards for Best Dance Direction, for his work on the films Go Into Your Dance (1935) and Broadway Hostess (1935) (a single nomination for work on two films), Cain and Mabel (1936), and Ready, Willing and Able (1937).

Other film credits included dance director for Flirtation Walk (1934), The Patient in Room 18 (1938), The Wizard of Oz (1939) and For Me and My Gal (1942).

His Broadway choreography credits included The Desert Song (1926), Good News (1927), Funny Face (1927), The New Moon (1928), Follow Thru (1929), Show Girl (1929), Flying High (1930), Ziegfeld Follies of 1931 and 1934, Take a Chance (1932), and Melody (1933) among others.
