= Benjamin Zemach =

Polish-Israeli choreographer and dancer

- בנימין צמח
- Born: 1 February 1901; Poland
- Died: 18 June 1997 (aged 96); Jerusalem, Israel
- Occupations: Choreographer, dancer

Benjamin Zemach (Hebrew: בנימין צמח; 1 February 1901 – 18 June 1997) was a Polish-Israeli choreographer and dancer. He was nominated for an Academy Award in the category Best Dance Direction for the film She.

Zemach died on 18 June 1997 in Jerusalem, at the age of 96.

== Selected filmography ==
- She (1935)
