= All the King's Horses (film) =

1935 film by Frank Tuttle

- Directed by: Frank Tuttle
- Screenplay by: Edmund H. North; Frank Tuttle; Frederick Stephani
- Based on: All the King's Horses by Lawrence Clark; Max Giersberg; Frederik Herendeen; Edward Horan
- Starring: Carl Brisson; Mary Ellis; Edward Everett Horton; Katherine DeMille
- Cinematography: Henry Sharp
- Distributed by: Paramount Pictures
- Release date: February 13, 1935
- Running time: 87 minutes
- Country: United States
- Language: English

All the Kings Horses is a 1935 American comedy musical film adapted from the 1934 Broadway musical of the same name by Frederick Herendeen (musical book and lyricist) and Edward A. Horan (music composer) which was in turn based on the play Carlo Rocco by Lawrence Clarke and Max Giersberg. The film was directed by Frank Tuttle and starring Carl Brisson and Mary Ellis. The film tells the story of a film actor who changes places with a Ruritanian prince. The screenplay is based on a play by Lawrence Clark, Max Giersberg, Frederik Herendeen and Edward Horan.

The film was nominated by the Academy of Motion Picture Arts and Sciences for Best Dance Direction.

== Plot ==
King Rudolf XIV of Langenstein battles with his wife Elaine, Queen of Langenstein over his beard; she hates it, he feels pressured to keep it by his cohorts who desire it, feeling it makes the young King appear more mature. She leaves him.

Renown singer Carlo Rocco, a former resident of Langenstein and his manager Con return to his home country. The King invites the pair for a special audience where they sing together. When the King sheds his beard, they discover that Carlo is his identical twin.

Carlo agrees to impersonate His Majesty whilst he has a secret holiday in another nation. The situation deteriorates when the King's friend Count Josef von Schlapstaat wishes the incognito King to stay with him for his own financial benefit using Miss Mimi to seduce him and the Queen returns to the palace.

== Cast ==
- Carl Brisson as King Rudolf XIV/Carlo Rocco
- Mary Ellis as Elaine, Queen of Langenstein
- Edward Everett Horton as Count Josef von Schlapstaat
- Katherine DeMille as Miss Mimi
- Eugene Pallette as Con Conley
- Arnold Korff as Baron Kraemer

== Bibliography ==
- Eames, John Douglas, The Paramount Story, London: Octopus Books, 1985
- Maltin, Leonard, Classic Movie Guide, New York: Plume, 2010
