= Sammy Lee (choreographer) =

American choreographer (1890–1968)

- Born: May 26, 1890; New York City
- Died: March 30, 1968 (aged 77)
- Occupation(s): Choreographer, dancer, producer

Sammy Lee (May 26, 1890 – March 30, 1968), born Samuel Levy, was an American choreographer, dancer, and producer who worked mainly on Broadway and for 20th Century Fox film corporation in Hollywood.

== Work on Broadway ==
Lee got his start on the Broadway stage as a dancer and choreographer, along with Signor Albertiera, in the Arthur Hammerstein produced Friml operetta, The Firefly. For the next several years Lee worked as a dancer and choreographer in many reviews before he got his big break as the choreographer for the George and Ira Gershwin musical, Lady, Be Good. In Lady, Be Good, Lee was the first to choreograph such hit songs as "Fascinating Rhythm", "Swiss Miss", and "Oh, Lady Be Good!". Lee was also one of the first choreographers to work on the Broadway stage with the young duo of Fred Astaire and Adele Astaire. Following the success of Lady, Be Good, Lee worked steadily in such shows as No, No, Nanette, Tip-Toes, The Cocoanuts, and Rio Rita. As his popularity grew in Manhattan, Lee drew the attention of famed Broadway producer, Florenz Ziegfeld Jr., who employed him to choreograph his Follies of 1927.

His most famous work for the stage was when he teamed up with Jerome Kern, Oscar Hammerstein II, and his friend Florenz Ziegfeld to create the musical Show Boat. Lee's choreography influenced the dance numbers in three film adaptations, including the famed 1951 production. Although Lee continued to work, being involved with six other productions following the success of Showboat, he never could top the success he found with the original production. In 1932, Lee both music directing and choreographed the Broadway revival of Showboat, his last theatrical credit.

== Work in film ==
Lee's work in film was not as prolific as it was in the theater, however, he was nominated for two Academy Awards during his career, both in the dance direction category. Once in 1935 for his work in the film King of Burlesque, and a second in 1937 for his work in Ali Baba Goes to Town.
