= Go into Your Dance =

1935 film by Archie Mayo

- Theatrical release poster
- Directed by: Archie Mayo
- Screenplay by: Earl Baldwin
- Based on: Go into Your Dance; 1934 novel by Bradford Ropes
- Produced by: Jack L. Warner; Samuel Bischoff
- Starring: Al Jolson; Ruby Keeler; Glenda Farrell; Barton MacLane
- Edited by: Harold McLernon
- Music by: Harry Warren; Al Dubin
- Production company: First National Pictures
- Distributed by: Warner Bros. Pictures
- Release date: April 20, 1935
- Running time: 89 minutes
- Country: United States
- Language: English
- Budget: $703,000
- Box office: $1,401,000

Go into Your Dance is a 1935 American musical drama film starring Al Jolson, Ruby Keeler, and Glenda Farrell. The film was directed by Archie Mayo, and is based on the novel of the same name by Bradford Ropes. It was released by Warner Bros. Pictures on April 20, 1935. An irresponsible Broadway star gets mixed up with gambling and gangsters.

== Plot ==
Broadway star Al Howard has a habit of walking out on hit shows. His sister Molly promises his agent he will never do it again, but he is banned from Broadway. Molly tracks Al down in Mexico, where he is on a binge and tells him she is done taking care of him. When Molly runs into Dorothy Wayne a friend who is a dancer, she begs Dorothy to form a team with Al, because she can get Al a job if he has a partner. At first Dorothy is reluctant but finally agrees.

It takes some work to convince Al, but he eventually agrees to team with Dorothy and they become a big success in Chicago. Dorothy falls in love with Al and thinking that he does not return her affection decides to quit the act. Al tells Molly of his plan to open his own nightclub on Broadway, and she convinces Dorothy to stay. Molly introduces Al to Duke Hutchinson, a gangster who is willing to back the club as a showcase for his wife, Luana Wells, a torch singer who wants to make a comeback. Al flirts with Luana, Dorothy warns him about his involvement with Luana, but Al continues his flirtation with her. Duke gives Al an additional $30,000 to open the club, but before opening night, Al uses the money to post bond for Molly, who has been arrested on suspicion of murder.

When Al turns down a proposal from Luana, she angrily tells Duke the club will not open on schedule, and he sends gunmen to kill Al. At the last minute, Molly is cleared of the murder and the necessary money is returned, with the show opening on time and to great applause. Duke tries to call off his gunmen, but Luana does not give them the message. Al finally realizes that he is in love with Dorothy and asks her to dinner. As they step out the door, Dorothy sees the gunmen and throws her body in front of Al. She is wounded and as Al holds her, he tells Dorothy that he loves her. The doctor proclaims that Dorothy will be fine and Al's club is a huge success.

== Cast ==
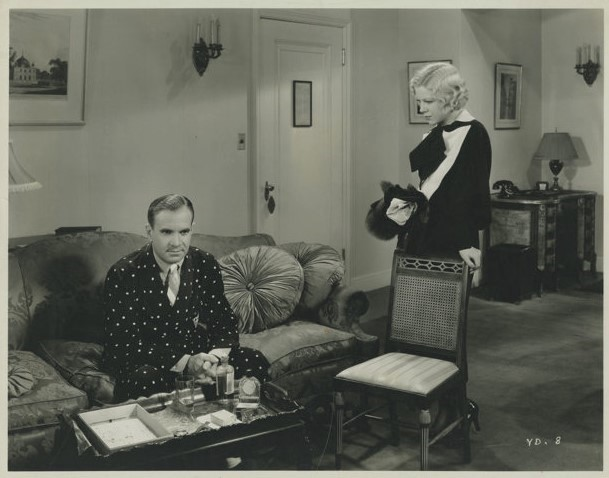
Al Jolson and Glenda Farrell in Go Into Your Dance (1935)

- Al Jolson as Al Howard
- Ruby Keeler as Dorothy 'Dot' Wayne
- Glenda Farrell as Molly Howard
- Barton MacLane as Duke Hutchinson
- Patsy Kelly as Irma 'Toledo' Knight
- Akim Tamiroff as Mexican in La Cucaracha Cantina
- Helen Morgan as Luana Wells
- Sharon Lynn as Nellie Lahey
- Benny Rubin as Drunk in La Cucaracha Cantina
- Phil Regan as Eddie 'Teddy' Rio
- Gordon Westcott as Fred
- William B. Davidson as Tom McGee
- Joyce Compton as Café Showgirl
- Joseph Crehan as H.P. Jackson
- Arthur Treacher as Latimer
- Russell Hicks as Sam Rupert
- Ward Bond as Herman Lahey
- Theresa Harris as Luana's Maid
- Marc Lawrence as Eddie Logan
- Robert Gleckler as Pete Brown
- Fred 'Snowflake' Toones as Snowflake
- Henry Kolker as Doctor
- Mary Carr as Wardrobe Mistress
- Joyzelle Joyner as Cantina Dancer
- Lita Chevret as Angry Showgirl
- Bobby Connolly as Dance Director

== Production ==
This is the only film that stars both Al Jolson and Ruby Keeler, who were married at the time. Barton MacLane was billed as Barton Mac Lane. It was shot at the Burbank Studios in Hollywood with sets designed by the art director John Hughes. Go into Your Dance was released in Britain as Casino de Paris.

Years after the film's initial release, Jolson's career was revitalized after the release of the 1946 Columbia Pictures film, The Jolson Story. Warner Bros. cashed in on the film's success by reissuing Go into Your Dance the following year. New opening titles were added which gave Jolson a solo over-the-title billing, as well as a written prologue to ensure audiences that the film took place in 1935. No other changes were added beyond the opening titles.

== Songs ==
This film, a famous early musical, includes the numbers "About a Quarter to Nine" and "Latin From Manhattan" sung by Al Jolson. The former song was also recreated in color in the film The Jolson Story (1946). Dance director Bobby Connolly received an Academy Award nomination for his work on the "Latin from Manhattan". Other songs with music and lyrics by Harry Warren and Al Dubin include:

- Go into Your Dance
- The Little Things You Used to Do
- Mammy, I'll Sing About You
- Casino de Paree
- An Old Fashioned Cocktail with an Old Fashioned Girl

== Reception ==
The New York Times movie review said: "On the debit side of the picture's ledger, one must report a dearth of comedy, a certain dragginess as the film reaches its half-way mark and Miss Keeler's not altogether successful attempt to do the rhumba, the tango and other "Spanish" dances. Her tap dancing is so much better. On the credit side are the Warren-Dubin songs, the absence—mark this!—of overhead shots of the chorus, Helen Morgan's rendition of "The Little Things You Used to Do", and Mr. Jolson. All told, "Go Into Your Dance" is not the best, not the worst, but generally above average for its type."

== Box office ==
According to Warner Bros records the film earned $912,000 domestic and $489,000 foreign.

== Home media ==
Warner Archive released the film on DVD on October 21, 2009.
