= Harry Ritz =

American actor and comedian (1907–1986)

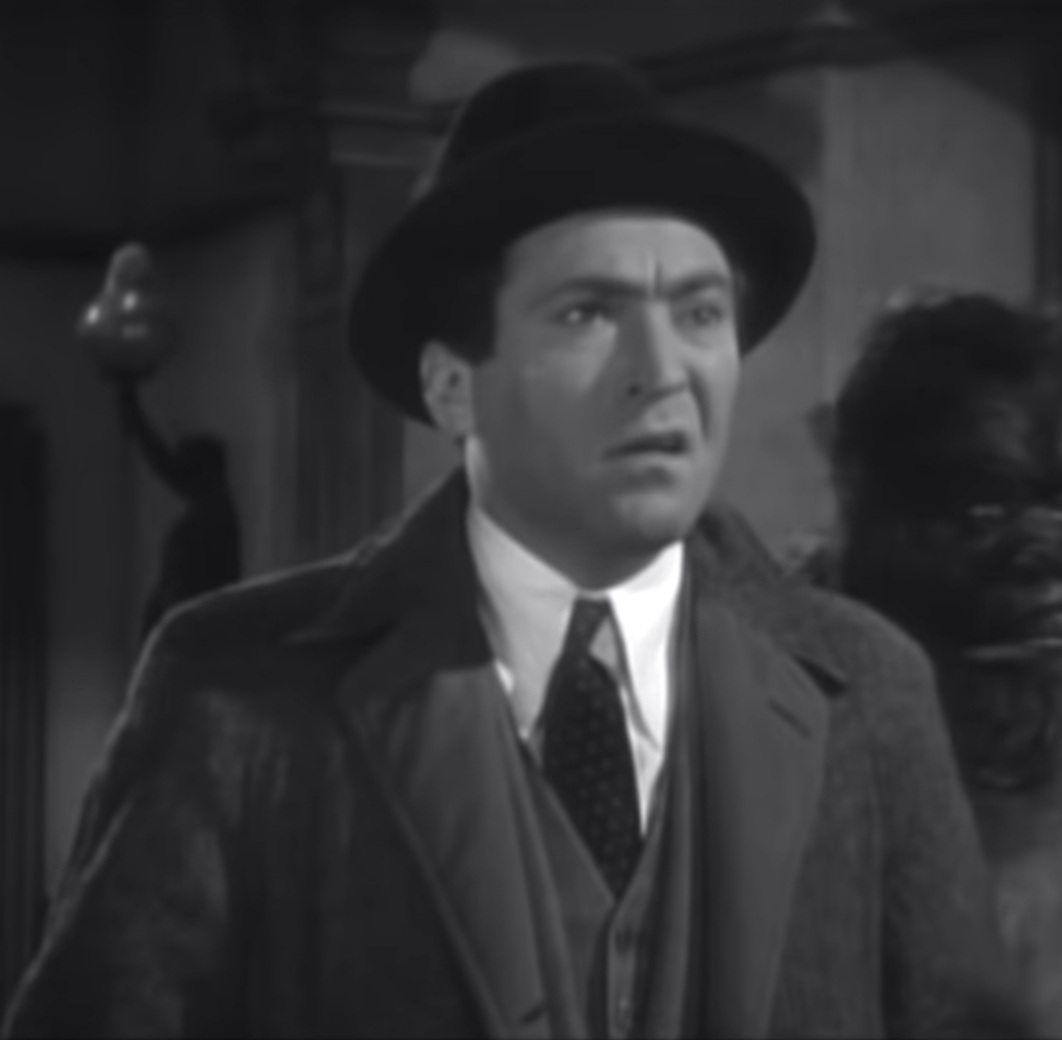
- Ritz in The Gorilla (1939)
- Born: Harry Joachim; May 28, 1907; Newark, New Jersey, U.S.
- Died: March 29, 1986 (aged 78); San Diego, California, U.S.
- Resting place: Hollywood Forever Cemetery
- Spouses: Charlotte Greenfield (m. 1936; died 1939) Betty May Heath (m. 1942; div. 1944): Betty Kellow Roday (m. 1945; div. 19??); Naomi C. Leon (m. 1965)
- Children: 7
- Relatives: Al Ritz (brother); Jimmy Ritz (brother)

Comedy career
- Years active: 1925–1978
- Medium: Film; stage
- Genre: Slapstick

Harry Ritz (né Joachim; May 22, 1907 – March 29, 1986) was an American comedian and actor. He was the youngest of the Ritz Brothers.

== Early life ==
Ritz was born Harry Joachim on May 28, 1907, in Newark, New Jersey. He was born the youngest of six children to parents Max and Pauline Joachim. His father was born in Austria-Hungary and owned a haberdashery and his mother was born in Russia.

Ritz was the brother to fellow comedians (and future comedy partners), Al and Jimmy Ritz. He also had another brother named George who would become the future manager to the Ritz Brothers and had a sister named Gertrude Soll.

== Career ==
By 1925, and after a full career on Broadway, he and brothers Al and Jimmy decided to team up and form a song/dance-and-comedy act called the Ritz Brothers. Al chose the name "Ritz" after seeing it on the side of a laundry truck. The brothers would have Harry standing in the middle singing "The Man in the Middle Is the Funny One", a song written for them. The other two brothers would then take to berating Harry for occupying that favored spot and, as they screamed their displeasure, Harry would wander about bellowing "Don't holler--please don't holler." Their comedy style was a tandem song and dance, as if they were one.

By 1930 they were playing the Palace where the headliner was Frank Fay with his bride, Barbara Stanwyck. By 1934, they had done their first film together as a team, Hotel Anchovy, all of 18 minutes long.

They worked in Shubert shows for a time and in 1932 caught the attention of Earl Carroll who featured them in his Vanities that year. They were appearing at the old Clover Club on Hollywood's Sunset Strip when Darryl F. Zanuck reportedly caught the act and signed them to a contract. (Al had appeared earlier in a silent film, The Avenging Trail in 1918.)

The Ritz Brothers started their Hollywood film career with 20th Century Fox in 1936, starring with Alice Faye in Sing, Baby, Sing. Later they were in One in a Million with Sonja Henie, The Three Musketeers with Don Ameche, Kentucky Moonshine and The Goldwyn Follies.

The brothers left Fox in 1940 and went with rival studio Universal. The brothers quit after filming the movie "Never a Dull Moment" in 1943 to concentrate on club dates. The Ritzes, among the first of the big-money acts in Las Vegas, made a few television specials in the early 1950s. They carried their zaniness on the road until 1965 when Al died in New Orleans where they were performing. Harry and Jimmy stayed together and by 1966 opened the new Caesars Palace in Las Vegas. They continued to perform, just the two of them, in Florida and upstate New York theaters, cruise ships, as well as some guest appearances on the Dick Cavett Show, Merv Griffin, etc. By the 1970s and 1980s, they had small roles in films such as Blazing Stewardesses (1975) and Won Ton Ton, the Dog Who Saved Hollywood (1976). Harry also appeared in a cameo in the 1976 Mel Brooks film Silent Movie.

== Personal life ==
Harry was married four times. He had 7 children (with three different mothers).

== Death and legacy ==
In his last years, Ritz battled cancer and Alzheimer's disease, but eventually died of pneumonia on March 29, 1986. He left behind a widow, his children, granddaughter and his sister. Ritz is buried at the Hollywood Forever Cemetery in Los Angeles.

Ritz, along with his brothers, influenced comedians such as Jerry Lewis, Sid Caesar, Mel Brooks, and Danny Kaye. Brooks cast Ritz in a cameo in his 1976 movie Silent Movie. In an interview with Esquire magazine, Brooks had this to say regarding Ritz:

As far as I'm concerned, Harry Ritz was the funniest man ever. His craziness and his freedom were unmatched. There was no intellectualizing with him. You just hoped there were no pointy objects in the room when he was working 'cause you were down on the floor, spitting, out of control, laughing your brains out. Harry Ritz always put me away. Always.

In that same interview, Lewis had this to say about Ritz:

Harry was the teacher. He had the extraordinary ability to deny himself dignity onstage. Harry taught us that the only thing that mattered was getting a laugh ‑whether you did it with a camel or with two rabbis humping a road map. Harry spawned us all. We all begged, borrowed and stole from him, every one of us. Without him, we wouldn't be here.

== Filmography ==
Year	Title	Role	Notes
1934	Hotel Anchovy	Harry – Hotel Manager	Short
1936	Sing, Baby, Sing	Himself	
1936	One in a Million	Himself	Uncredited
1937	On the Avenue	One of the Ritz Brothers	Uncredited
1937	You Can't Have Everything	One of the Ritz Brothers	Uncredited
1937	Life Begins in College	Himself	
1937	Ali Baba Goes to Town	Himself – at Fictional Premiere	Uncredited
1937	Cinema Circus	Himself	Short, Uncredited, (archive footage)
1938	The Goldwyn Follies	Himself	Uncredited
1938	Kentucky Moonshine	Himself	
1938	Straight Place and Show	Himself	
1939	The Three Musketeers	First Lackey	
1939	The Gorilla	Harrigan	
1939	Pack Up Your Troubles	Himself – The Ritz Brothers	Uncredited
1940	Argentine Nights	Himself	
1942	Behind the Eight Ball	Harry Jester	
1943	Hi'ya, Chum	Merry Madcap Harry	
1943	Show-Business at War	Himself	
1943	Never a Dull Moment	Himself – One of The Three Funny Bunnies	Uncredited, Documentary short
1956	Brooklyn Goes to Las Vegas	Himself	Short
1975	Blazing Stewardesses	Harry	
1976	Won Ton Ton, the Dog Who Saved Hollywood	Cleaning Woman	Uncredited
1976	Silent Movie	Man in Tailor Shop	
