= Jimmy Ritz =

American comedian and actor (1904–1985)

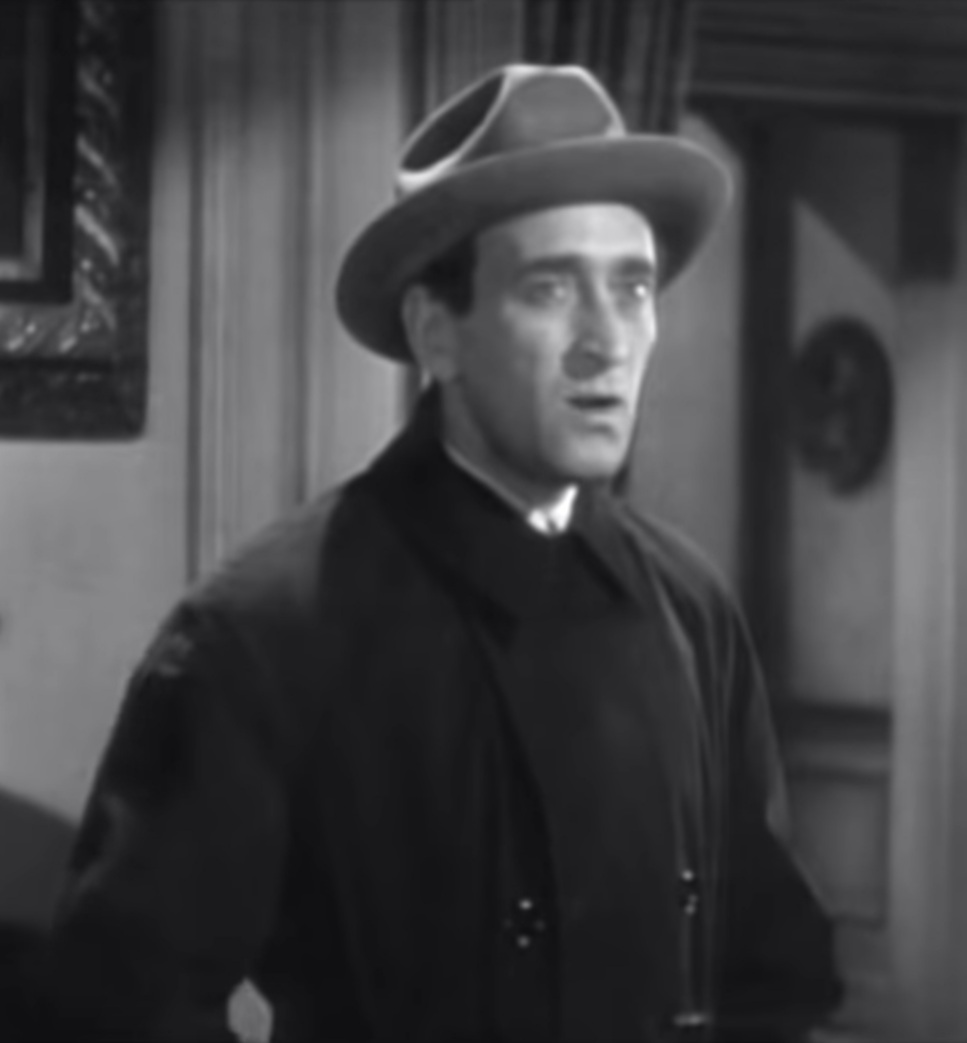
- Ritz in The Gorilla (1939)
- Born: Samuel Joachim; October 4, 1904; Newark, New Jersey, U.S.
- Died: November 17, 1985 (aged 81); Los Angeles, California, U.S.
- Resting place: Hollywood Forever Cemetery
- Spouse(s): Ruth Hillard (m. 1938; div. 19??) Judy Lee (m. 1953; div. 1959)
- Children: 1

Comedy career
- Years active: 1925–1976
- Medium: Film; stage
- Genre: Slapstick

Jimmy Ritz (born Samuel Joachim; October 4, 1904 – November 17, 1985), was an American comedian and actor. He was also the second Ritz Brother.

== Early life ==
Ritz was born Samuel Joachim to parents Max (December 1871 – January 4, 1939) and Pauline Joachim (May 1874 – November 26, 1935) on October 4, 1904. His father was a haberdasher from Austria-Hungary and his mother was Russian. Ritz had three brothers, George, Al, and Harry, and a sister, Gertrude Soll.

== Career ==
The Ritz Brothers began as a dancing act in 1925, and by 1929 they had become vaudeville headliners. When vaudeville faded, they took their act, which combined complicated dance routines, sound-alike singing voices and a distinctively zany, juvenile humor (their theme song was titled Collegiate), to film, full theatrical presentations, and eventually television.

They were appearing on the Sunset Strip in Hollywood when movie producer Darryl F. Zanuck spotted them. Their first film, Sing, Baby, Sing, in 1936, was followed by On the Avenue, You Can't Have Everything, Life Begins in College, Hi'ya, Chum, One in a Million, The Gorilla, The Three Musketeers, The Goldwyn Follies, Straight, Place and Show, Pack Up Your Troubles, Argentine Nights, Behind the Eight Ball, Blazing Stewardesses and Won Ton Ton, the Dog Who Saved Hollywood, the last two with Harry only. Al died in 1965.

== Death ==
Ritz died on November 17, 1985, in Los Angeles, California due to heart disease at the age of 81. He is buried with his brothers at the Hollywood Forever Cemetery in Los Angeles, California.

== Filmography ==
Year	Movie	Role	Notes
1934	Hotel Anchovy	Jimmy - Hotel Bellboy	Short
1936	Sing, Baby, Sing	Himself	
1937	On the Avenue	One of The Ritz Brothers	Uncredited
1937	You Can't Have Everything	One of The Ritz Brothers	Uncredited
1937	Life Begins in College	Himself	
1937	Ali Baba Goes to Town	Himself	
1937	Cinema Circus	Himself	Uncredited, (archive footage)
1937	One in a Million	The Ritz Brothers	
1938	The Goldwyn Follies	Himself	Uncredited
1938	Kentucky Moonshine	Himself	
1938	Straight Place and Show	Himself	Uncredited
1939	The Three Musketeers	One of The Three Lackeys	Uncredited
1939	The Gorilla	Garrity - a Ritz Brother	
1939	Pack Up Your Troubles	One of The Ritz Brothers	Uncredited
1940	Argentine Nights	Jimmy	
1942	Behind the Eight Ball	Jimmy Jester	
1943	Hi'ya, Chum	Merry Madcap	
1943	Show-Business at War	Himself	Uncredited
1943	Never a Dull Moment	The Three Funny Bubbies	
1956	Brooklyn Goes to Las Vegas	Himself	Short
1975	Blazing Stewardesses	Jimmy	
1976	Won Ton Ton, the Dog Who Saved Hollywood	Cleaning Woman	Final film role
