= Al Ritz =

American comedian and actor (1901–1965)

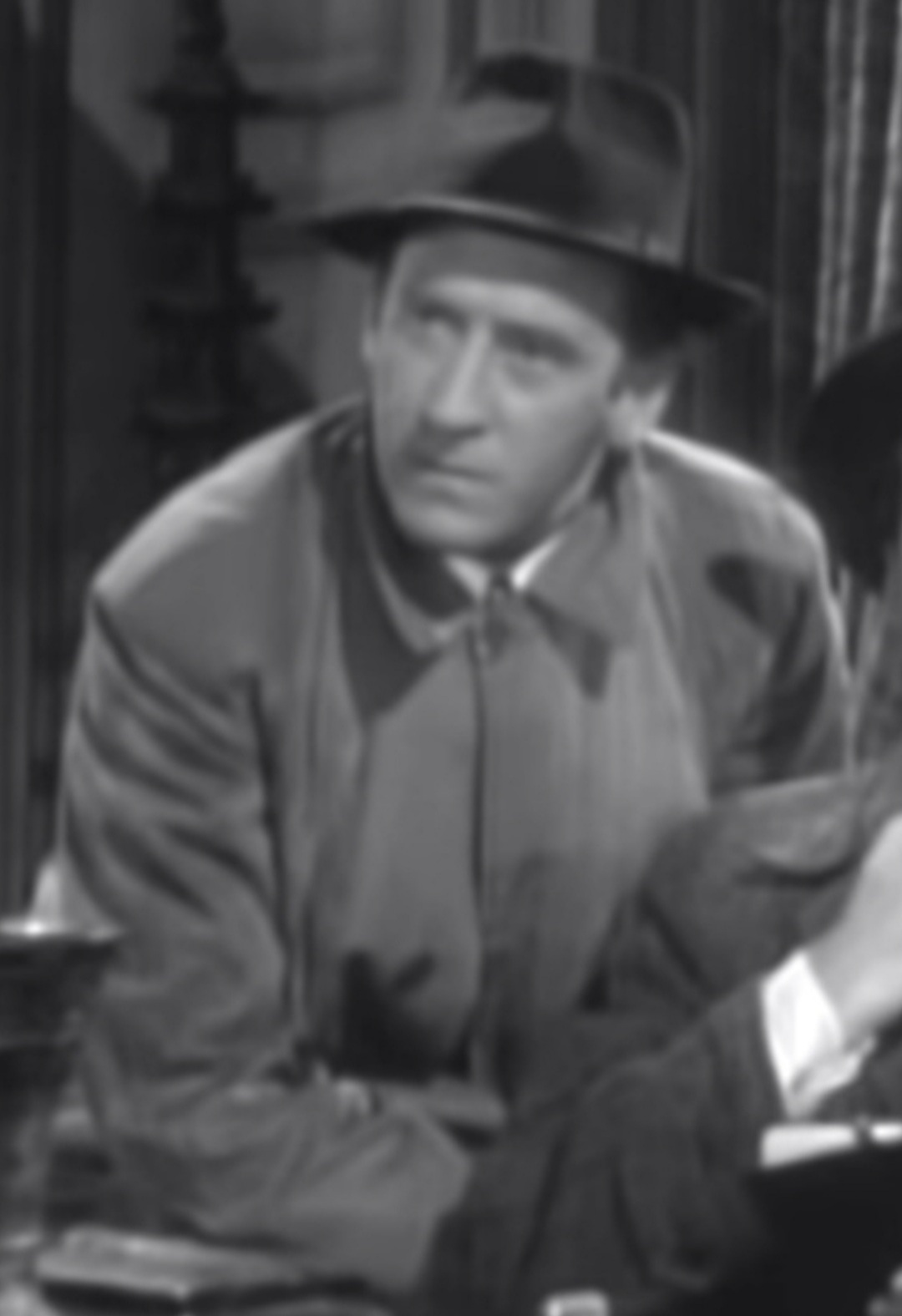
- Ritz in The Gorilla (1939)
- Born: Albert Joachim; August 27, 1901; Newark, New Jersey, U.S.
- Died: December 22, 1965 (aged 64); New Orleans, Louisiana, U.S.
- Resting place: Hollywood Forever Cemetery

Comedy career
- Years active: 1925–1965
- Medium: Film; stage
- Genre: Slapstick

Al Ritz (born Albert "Al" Joachim; August 27, 1901 – December 22, 1965), was an American comedian, actor and entertainer. Ritz was the oldest of the Ritz Brothers.

== Early life ==
Ritz was born Albert Joachim on August 27, 1901, in Newark, New Jersey. Ritz had three brothers, George, Samuel (later "Jimmy Ritz"), and Harry, and a sister, Gertrude Soll.

== Career ==
=== Early career ===
Ritz began his solo career shortly after he finished high school to join vaudeville.

=== The Ritz Brothers ===
After the three Joachim brothers graduated from high school, they decided to team up as a song-and-comedy act. The brothers began using the name "Ritz" for their nightclub act reportedly after seeing the name on the side of a laundry truck. With fourth brother George acting as their agent, the Ritz Brothers worked nightclubs and vaudeville. The act consisted of the trio indulging in precision dancing, tongue-twisting lampoons of popular stories and songs, and slapstick.

In 1934, the Ritz boys made their screen debut in the two-reel comedy Hotel Anchovy, which led to their being signed by 20th Century Fox as a specialty act. Sing, Baby, Sing (1936) was the first feature film to costar the Ritzes, and their first starring role followed a year later in Life Begins in College.

== Personal life ==
Ritz was married once, to Antoinette 'Annette' Calamari Ritz. They were married until his death. Ritz did not have any children.

== Death ==
The Ritz Brothers were appearing at New Orleans' Roosevelt Hotel in December 1965 when Al died of a heart attack on December 22.

== Filmography ==
Year	Movie
1934	Hotel Anchovy
1936	Sing, Baby, Sing
1937	Cinema Circus
1937	One in a Million
1937	On the Avenue
1937	You Can't Have Everything
1937	Life Begins in College
1937	Ali Baba Goes to Town
1938	The Goldwyn Follies
1938	Kentucky Moonshine
1938	Straight Place and Show
1939	The Three Musketeers
1939	The Gorilla
1939	Pack Up Your Troubles
1940	Argentine Nights
1942	Behind the Eight Ball
1943	Hi'ya, Chum
1943	Show-Business at War
1943	Never a Dull Moment
1956	Brooklyn Goes to Las Vegas
