= Sid Kuller =

American writer and lyricist

Sid Kuller (27 October 1910 New York City, New York – 16 September 1993 in Sherman Oaks, California) was an American comedy writer, producer and lyricist/composer, who concentrated on special musical material, gags and sketches for leading comics. He collaborated with Ray Golden and Hal Fimberg on the screenplay of the Marx Brothers' vehicle The Big Store, for which he also supplied the lyrics to the musical climax, "The Tenement Symphony". Earlier in their careers, Kuller and Golden wrote comedy songs and special material for the Ritz Brothers. Although he wrote prodigiously and with facility throughout his life, Kuller admitted, "The creation of comedy is a painful experience".

== Vaudeville ==
After attending Columbia University, Kuller began contributing jokes and songs to vaudeville performers, such as Bert Lahr and Jack Benny, and became a ghost-gag-writer for the legendary Al Boasberg. While working on an Earl Carroll Vanities show he started to write comedy bits for the precision-dancing Ritz Brothers, who brought him and fellow-writer Ray Golden with them to Hollywood in 1937.

On Broadway Kuller and Golden were part of the team which wrote the book for the progressive 1940 revue Meet the People, which included one of his early hit songs Elmer's Wedding Day (with music by Jay Gorney). He also wrote the political musical revue, O Say Can You Sing, which was performed in Chicago, and may have been one of the producers of the original Chicago production of the Federal Theater Project's groundbreaking all-black Swing Mikado., which transferred to Broadway without him.

== Hollywood career ==
Through a string of Ritz Brothers' credits, the team of Kuller and Golden became known as one of Hollywood's best special material writers. At this time Kuller, who specialized in comedic political sketches and blackout gags, kept an open house in the Hollywood Hills where jazz and swing bands regularly jammed, including Duke Ellington's. Groucho Marx quickly recognized Kuller's comedic value and kept him on set to do lines for The Big Store as they went along (e.g., he's credited with, "You mean a woman of your culture and money and beauty and money would marry this impostor?").

Returning after war service with the U.S. Army Air Corps First Motion Picture Unit, Kuller divided his time between writing and producing for Broadway (Alive and Kicking, debuting Gwen Verdon 1950); television (Colgate Comedy Hour, hosts Martin and Lewis, Donald O'Connor 1952–3; The Milton Berle Show 1951; The Jackie Gleason Show 1970); and various night-club acts (e.g. The Sportsmen Quartet). In 1952 he executive produced with Ben Hecht Actor's and Sin, using archive footage of Louis B. Mayer and Jack L. Warner, which ran into trouble when some theater chains refused to show it on the grounds that it lampooned Hollywood.

In the 1970s, Sid collaborated with Sandy Matlowsky and Tige Andrews (of Mod Squad fame) on two original songs on the Tiger Records label in Los Angeles, California. "The Modfather" and "Keep America Beautiful" were the A and B sides of the vinyl 45 single release. Fans felt that these songs had humor and poignancy for the post 60s youth culture that was embracing political awareness and the social revolution. Sid's writing techniques are at its best in this rare collection “that contributed to the advocacy of world peace and the environmental movement”.

== Black Entertainment Involvement ==
Redd Foxx recalled that Kuller had become a household name among black performers of the 1940s. While working on the cotton-picking pastiche in The Big Store ("Up n' down the ole plantation, All the cotton was-a rottin away etc."), Kuller conceived with Duke Ellington the idea for a black, topical revue that would challenge segregation and try to break down the old Uncle Tom and Stepin Fetchit stereotypes still prevalent in the industry at that time. Their stated aim was to correct the race situation through theatrical propaganda.

Jump for Joy, starring Dorothy Dandridge, Ellington and other leading black performers, ran for three months at the Mayan Theater in Los Angeles before an integrated audience, with the backing of the Marx Brothers, Orson Welles and other Hollywood liberals. Kuller co-directed most of the skits he wrote, and together with Paul Francis Webster contributed biting lyrics to the music of Hal Borne and Ellington (e.g. "Fare thee well, land of cotton; cotton lisle is out of style"). As Kuller later explained: "Traditionally, black humor had been portrayed by blacks for white audiences from a white point of view. Our material was from the point of view of black people looking at whites." Although the show was an artistic and popular success, it had to be shut down with the outbreak of the Pacific War.

Kuller was also an early supporter of comedian and jazzman Scatman Crothers, with whom he worked on television. Kuller cast him in a featured role in his directorial debut, the 1950 swing version of The Return of Gilbert and Sullivan, filmed in the United Kingdom. For Louis Armstrong Kuller created a jazz versus opera routine featuring Robert Merrill. Kuller together with Borne also contributed to the successful revitalization of the Will Mastin Trio song and dance act in the early 50s, helping launch the breakthrough of Sammy Davis Jr. .

During the 1950s he was involved with some other projects for black performers, most of which did not come to fruition: including another revue entitled Swing Family Robinson, a biopic of Ellington and a revival of Jumpin for Joy in Las Vegas.

== Later career ==
Kuller joined ASCAP in 1942 and was active in organizing many Variety Club charity shows. In the 1956 Jule Styne production Mr. Wonderful, one of Kuller's interpolated songs ("Daddy, Uncle and Me") was performed by Sammy Davis, Jr.

He was also the writer and producer of Miltown Revisited, the disastrous last Las Vegas show of Abbott and Costello, when the partnership finally split up in 1956. Kuller recalled that after Abbott turned up drunk for the second show at the Sahara Hotel, Costello never forgave him: "It was the most terrible night of [Kuller's] life in show business."

Nevertheless, Kuller continued producing night-club acts until his death and was responsible for writing two parody shows for the Jewish dialect comedians Mickey Katz and Billy Gray: The Cohen Mutiny (i.e. Caine takeoff) and My Fairfax Lady, where an upperclass British woman is taught to speak with a Jewish accent!

In 1963 Kuller was heavily involved in writing (and rewriting) the ambitious, but troubled Vernon Duke musical Zenda, based on The Prisoner of Zenda, for the San Francisco Light Opera Company with Alfred Drake and Chita Rivera. But his final stage experience was to be the hit 1981-3 revue Sophisticated Ladies, starring Gregory Hines, where famous songs he and others wrote with Ellington (e.g. "Bli-Blips") were introduced to a new generation.

He and his wife Morine were supporters of Oakwood, the cooperative school established in Hollywood by the actor Robert Ryan, a fellow liberal active in the Civil rights movement, and his Quaker wife.

== Filmography ==
=== As writer/lyricist ===
- 1937 : Life Begins in College (Ritz Bros. with Tony Martin
- 1938 : Damon Runyon's Straight, Place & Show
- 1938 : Kentucky Moonshine (Ritz Bros., Tony Martin)
- 1938 : The Goldwyn Follies (Ritz Bros.)
- 1939 : The Three Musketeers (Ritz Bros.)
- 1940 : Argentine Nights (Ritz Bros.)
- 1940 : Melody Ranch (Gene Autry singing cowboy picture)
- 1940 : Road to Singapore (first road picture of Bob Hope and Bing Crosby)
- 1941 : The Big Store (Marx Bros. with Tony Martin)
- 1945 : Spreadin' the Jam
- 1950 : The Return of Gilbert and Sullivan
- 1951 : Slaughter Trail (a Howard Hughes production notorious for the beginning of the blacklist)
- 1959 "Blues, the Mother of Sin", "Little Mama" and "Piano Man" with Billy Eckstine for a record "Billy Eckstine & Count Basie Inc."

=== as director ===
- 1950 : The Return of Gilbert and Sullivan (swing version of Gilbert and Sullivan, featuring Scatman Crothers and Sportsmen Quartet)

=== as producer ===
- 1952 : Actor's and Sin (Sid Kuller Productions)
- 1960 : Stop! Look! and Laugh! (an unauthorized Three Stooges compilation, ending with a voice-over chimp fairy tale produced by Kuller)

=== as composer ===
- 1950 : The Return of Gilbert and Sullivan
- 1956 - Mr. Wonderful - song "Daddy, Uncle, and Me"
- 1960 : Stop! Look! and Laugh!
