= List of stage names: R =

This list of stage names lists names used by those in the entertainment industry, alphabetically by their stage name's surname (or the best approximation) followed by the given name (or the best approximation) where the surname begins with "R". One-word stage names are presented in List of one-word stage names.

Stage name	Birth name	Life	Notability	Notes
Luck Ra	Juan Facundo Almenara Ordóñez	1999–	Argentine singer	
Sun Ra	Herman Poole Blount	1914–1993	American musician and poet	
Roddy Radiation	Roderick James Byers	1955–	English musician (The Specials)	
Johnny Răducanu	Radǔcanu Creţu	1931–2011	Romanian jazz musician	
Charlotte Rae	Charlotte Rae Lubotsky	1926–2018	American actress and singer	
Issa Rae	Jo-Issa Rae Diop	1985–	American actress, writer and producer	
Chips Rafferty	John Goffage	1909–1971	Australian actor	
George Raft	George Ranft	1901–1980	American actor	
A. R. Rahman	A. S. Dileep Kumar	1967–	Indian composer and musician	Also known as ARR
Jessica Raine	Jessica Lloyd	1982–	English actress	
Cristina Raines	Cristina Herazo	1952–	American former actress and model	
Ralph Rainger	Ralph Reichenthal	1901–1942	American composer	
Dominic Rains	Amin Nazemzadeh	1982–	Iranian-American actor	
Ethan Rains	Iman Nazemzadeh	1981–	Iranian-American actor	
Jody Rainwater	Charles Edward Johnson	1920–2011	American musician and radio personality	Also known as Little Jody Rainwater
Rosa Raisa	Raitza Burchstein	1893–1963	Russian opera singer	
Shiva Rajkumar	Nagaraju Shiva Puttaswamy	1962–	Indian actor	
Hanna Ralph	Johanna Günther	1888–1978	German actress	
Jessie Ralph	Jessie Ralph Chambers	1864–1944	American actress	
Eddie Rambeau	Edward Fluri	1943–	American singer, songwriter and actor	
Marie Rambert	Cyvia Rambam	1888–1982	Polish-English dancer	
Natacha Rambova	Winifred Hudnut	1897–1966	American costume designer	
Twiggy Ramirez	Jeordie White	1971–	American musician (Marilyn Manson)	
C. J. Ramone	Christopher Joseph Ward	1965–	American musician (Ramones)	
Dee Dee Ramone	Douglas Colvin	1951–2002	American musician (Ramones)	
Joey Ramone	Jeffrey Hyman	1951–2001	American singer (Ramones)	
Johnny Ramone	John Cummings	1948–2004	American musician (Ramones)	
Marky Ramone	Mark Bell	1952–	American musician (Ramones)	
Richie Ramone	Richard Reinhardt	1957–	American musician (Ramones)	
Tommy Ramone	Tamás Erdélyi (changed to Thomas Erdelyi)	1949–2014	Hungarian-born American musician (Ramones)	
Sally Rand	Helen Beck	1904–1979	American dancer and actress	
Frankie Randall	Frank Lisbona	1938–2014	American singer and musician	
Tony Randall	Leonard Rosenberg	1920–2014	American actor	
Walter Randall	Walter Frank Fugard	1929–2006	South African-English actor	
James Randi	James Randall Hamilton Zwinge	1928–2020	Canadian-American magician	
Jane Randolph	Jane Roemer	1914–2009	American actress	
John Randolph	Emanuel Cohen	1915–2004	American actor	
Joyce Randolph	Joyce Sirola	1924–2024	American actress	
Devika Rani	Devika Rani Chaudhuri	1908–1994	Indian actress	
Shabba Ranks	Rawlston Gordon	1966–	Jamaican musician	
Barney Rapp	Barney Rappaport	1900–1970	American orchestra leader	
Dizzee Rascal	Dylan Kwabena Mills	1984–	English rapper	
DJ Rashad	Rashad Harden	1979–2014	American electronic musician, producer and DJ	
Thalmus Rasulala	Jack Crowder	1935–1991	American actor	
Luis Raúl	Luís Raúl Martínez-Rodríguez	1962–2014	Puerto Rican actor and comedian	
Polo Ravales	Paul Rodil-Gruenberg	1982–	Filipino actor and model	
Genya Ravan	Genyusha Zelkovicz	1940–	Polish-American singer and music producer	
Elsa Raven	Elsa Rabinowitz	1929–2020	American actress	
Marion Raven	Marion Ravn	1984–	Norwegian singer and songwriter	
East Bay Ray	Raymond Pepperell	1958–	American musician (Dead Kennedys)	
James Ray	James Raymond	1941–1963	American singer	Originally known as Little Jimmy Ray
Nicholas Ray	Raymond Nicholas Kienzle Jr.	1911–1979	American film director, screenwriter and actor	
Philip Ray	Roy Edgar Cochrane	1898–1978	English actor	
Ted Ray	Charles Olden	1905–1977	English comedian and actor	
Gene Rayburn	Eugene Peter Jeljenic	1917–1999	American radio and television personality	Known as Eugene Rubessa after taking the surname of his stepfather (by his mother's second marriage)
Jazz Raycole	Jazzmine Raycole Dillingham	1988–	American actress and dancer	
Carol Raye	Kathleen Corkrey	1923–2022	British-born Australian actress, singer and comedian	
Martha Raye	Margy Reed	1916–1994	American actress, comedienne and singer	
Gene Raymond	Raymond Guion	1908–1998	American actor	
Saint Raymond	Callum Burrows	1995–	English singer-songwriter	
Amber Rayne	Meghan Rayne	1984–2016	American pornographic actress	
Andy Razaf	Andriamanantena Razafinkarefo	1895–1973	American poet, composer and lyricist	
Jay Reatard	James Lindsey Jr.	1980–2010	American musician (The Reatards)	
Oyibo Rebel	Fares Boulos	Unknown	American musician	
Louisiana Red	Iverson Minter	1932–2012	American blues musician and singer	
Piano Red	William Perryman	1911–1985	American blues musician	
Russian Red	Lourdes Hernández	1985–	Spanish singer-songwriter	
Tampa Red	Hudson Whittaker	1903–1981	American musician	
Leon Redbone	Dickran Gobalian	1949–2019	Cypriot-American singer-songwriter and musician	
Alan Reed	Herbert Bergman	1907–1977	American actor	
Donna Reed	Donna Mullenger	1921–1986	American actress and comedienne	
Heida Reed	Heiða Sigurðardóttir	1988–	Icelandic actress and model	
Jerry Reed	Jerry Reed Hubbard	1937–2008	American singer-songwriter and musician	
Paul Reed	Sidney Kahn	1909–2007	American actor	
Robert Reed	John Robert Rietz Jr.	1932–1992	American actor and director	
Della Reese	Delloreese Early	1931–2017	American singer and actress	
George Reeves	George Brewer	1914–1959	American actor	
Vic Reeves	James Roderick Moir	1959–	English comedian	
Joan Regan	Joan Bethel	1926/1928–2013	English pop singer	
Nadja Regin	Nadežda Poderegin	1931–2019	Serbian actress	
Elis Regina	Elis Regina Carvalho-Costa	1945–1982	Brazilian singer	
Ebony Reigns	Priscilla Opoku-Kwarteng	1997–2018	Ghanaian singer	
Max Reinhardt	Maximilian Goldmann	1873–1943	Austrian-American actor	
MC Ren	Lorenzo Patterson	1969–	American rapper, songwriter and record producer (N.W.A)	
Duncan Renaldo	Renault Renaldo Duncan	1904–1980	Romanian-American actor	
Colette Renard	Colette Raget	1924–2010	French actress and singer	
Mariana Renata	Mariana Renata Dantec	1983–	French-Indonesian model	
Line Renaud	Jacqueline Ente	1928–	French singer and actress	
Diane Renay	Renée Diane Kushner	1945–	American pop singer	
MC Rene	René El Khazraje	1976–	German rapper and stand-up comedian	
Wendy Rene	Mary Frierson	1947–2014	American soul singer and songwriter	
Anne Renée	Manon Kirouac	1950–	Canadian singer	
Ciara Renée	Ciara Renée Harper	1990–	American actress and musician	
Jean Reno	Juan Morera y Herrera-Jiménez	1948–	Spanish-French actor	
Mike Reno	Joseph Michael Rynoski	1955–	Canadian musician and singer (Loverboy)	
Martin Rev	Martin Reverby	1947–	American musician (Suicide)	
Paul Revere	Paul Revere Dick	1938–2014	American musician (Paul Revere & the Raiders)	
Dorothy Revier	Doris Velagra	1904–1993	American actress	
Simon Rex	Simon Rex Cutright	1974–	American actor	
Alvino Rey	Alvin McBurney	1908–2004	American jazz musician and bandleader	
Antonia Rey	Antonia Rangel	1926/1927–2019	Cuban-American actress	
Carmela Rey	Carmela Sánchez-Levi	1931–2018	Mexican singer and actress	
Fernando Rey	Fernando Casado D'Arambillet	1917–1994	Spanish actor	
Florián Rey	Antonio Martínez del Castillo	1894–1962	Spanish director, actor and screenwriter	
Reynaldo Rey	Harry Reynolds	1940–2015	American actor, comedian and television personality	
Craig Reynolds	Harold Enfield	1907–1949	American actor	
Donnelly Rhodes	Donnelly Rhodes Henry	1937–2018	Canadian actor	
Erik Rhodes	Ernest Sharpe	1906–1990	American actor and singer	
Marjorie Rhodes	Millicent Wise	1897–1979	English actress	
Nick Rhodes	Nicholas Bates	1962–	English musician (Duran Duran)	
Randi Rhodes	Randi Bueten	1959–	American political commentator	
Busta Rhymes	Trevor Smith Jr.	1972–	American rapper, songwriter, record producer and actor	
Matthew Rhys	Matthew Rhys Evans	1974–	Welsh actor	
Rhythim Is Rhythim	Derrick May	1963–	American electronic musician	Also known as Mayday
Toni Ribas	Antoni García Cabra	1975–	Spanish pornographic actor and director	
Buddy Rich	Bernard Rich	1917–1987	American musician and bandleader	
Don Rich	Donald Ulrich	1941–1974	American country musician	
Tony Rich	Anthony Jeffries	1971–	American singer-songwriter	
Cliff Richard	Harry Webb	1940–	English singer	
Emily Richard	Anne Richards	1948–2024	British actress	
Little Richard	Richard Penniman	1932–2020	American musician, singer and songwriter	
Wendy Richard	Wendy Emerton	1943–2009	English actress	
Shane Richie	Shane Roche	1964–	English actor and singer	
Kane Richmond	Frederick Bowditch	1906–1973	American actor	
Lucille Ricksen	Ingeborg Ericksen	1910–1925	American actress	
Flo Rida	Tramar Dillard	1979–	American rapper, singer and songwriter	
John Ridgely	John Rea	1909–1968	American actor	
Robert Ridgely	Robert Ritterbusch	1931–1997	American actor	
Suzanne Ridgeway	Ione Ahrens	1918–1996	American actress	
Robert Rietti	Lucio Herbert Rietti	1923–2015	English actor	Also credited as Robert Rietty
Ron Rifkin	Saul Rifkin	1939–	American actor	
Edward Rigby	Edward Coke	1879–1951	English character actor	
Ita Rina	Tamara Đorđević	1907–1979	Slovenian actress	
Rosa Rio	Elizabeth Raub	1902–2010	American musician	
Virtual Riot	Christian Valentin Brunn	1994-	German electronic music producer and DJ	Previously known as Your Personal Tranquilizer
Richard Rishi	Richard Babu	1977–	Indian actor	
Alvin Risk	Marcio Alvarado	1988–	American music producer, singer and DJ	Previously known as Telemetrik
Maria Rita	Maria Rita Camargo Mariano	1977–	Brazilian singer	
Al Ritz	Albert Joachim	1901–1965	American comedian and actor	
Harry Ritz	Harry Joachim	1907–1986	American comedian and actor	
Jimmy Ritz	Samuel Joachim	1904–1985	American comedian and actor	
Jonas Rivanno	Jonas Rivanno Wattimena	1987–	Indonesian actor and singer	
Violeta Rivas	Ana-María Adinolfi	1937–2018	Argentine singer and actress	
Mon Rivera	Efraín Rivera Castillo	1924–1978	Puerto Rican musician	Also known as Moncito or Little Mon
Joan Rivers	Joan Molinsky	1933–2014	American comedienne and actress	
Johnny Rivers	John Ramistella	1942–	American musician	
Larry Rivers	Yitzroch Grossberg	1923–2002	American artist, musician and filmmaker	
Chappell Roan	Kayleigh Amstutz	1998–	American singer and songwriter	
Black Rob	Robert Ross	1968–2021	American rapper	
Cindy Robbins	Cynthia Robichaux	Unknown	American actress	
Jerome Robbins	Jerome Rabinowitz	1918–1998	American dancer, choreographer, director and producer	
Marty Robbins	Martin Robinson	1925–1982	American singer, songwriter and musician	
Peter Robbins	Louis Nanasi	1956–2022	American actor	
Chris Roberts	Christian Kluśaček	1944–2017	German singer and actor	
Joan Roberts	Josephine Seagrist	1917–2012	American actress	
Kane Roberts	Robert Athis	1962–	American musician (Alice Cooper)	
Roy Roberts	Roy Jones	1906–1975	American character actor	
Robbie Robertson	Jaime Klegerman	1943–2023	Canadian musician (The Band)	
Alys Robi	Alys Robitaille	1923–2011	Canadian singer	
Edward G. Robinson	Emanuel Goldenberg	1893–1973	Romanian-American actor	
Sugar Ray Robinson	Walker Smith Jr.	1921–1989	American professional boxer	
Stuart Robson	Henry Robson Stuart	1836–1903	American actor	
Patricia Roc	Felicia Herold	1915–2003	English actress	
Alex Rocco	Alessandro Petricone Jr.	1936–2015	American actor	
Rosanna Roces	Jennifer Cruz Adriano	1972–	Filipina actress	Also known as Osang
Susan Roces	Susan Levy Sonora	1941–2022	Filipina actress	
Aesop Rock	Ian Bavitz	1976–	American rapper	
Chubb Rock	Richard Simpson	1968–	American rapper	
Crissy Rock	Christine Murray	1958–	English actress and comedienne	
DJ Lance Rock	Lance Robertson	1965–	American musician, singer and DJ	
Kid Rock	Robert Ritchie	1971–	American singer, songwriter and rapper	
Pete Rock	Peter Phillips	1970–	American music producer, DJ and rapper	
Peter Rock	Peter Mociulski von Remenyk	1945–2016	Austrian-Chilean musician	
Spank Rock	Naeem Hanks		American rapper and songwriter	
Lee Rocker	Leon Drucker	1961–	American musician (Stray Cats)	
Rikki Rockett	Richard Ream	1961–	American drummer (Poison)	
Clara Rockmore	Clara Reisenberg	1911–1998	Lithuanian musician	
James Roday	James Rodriguez	1976–	American actor, director and screenwriter	
Gaby Rodgers	Gabrielle Rosenberg	1928–	German-American actress	
Red Rodney	Robert Chudnick	1927–1994	American jazz musician	
Lolita Rodriguez	Dolores Marquez Clark	1935–2016	Filipina actress	
Beth Rogan	Jenifer Puckle	1931–2015	English actress	
Ranking Roger	Roger Charlery	1963–2019	English musician (The Beat and General Public)	
Jean Rogers	Eleanor Lovegren	1916–1991	American actress	
Roy Rogers	Leonard Franklin Slye	1911–1998	American singer, actor, television host and rodeo performer	
Jelly Roll	Jason Bradley DeFord	1984–	American rapper, singer and songwriter	
Freddie Roman	Fred Kirschenbaum	1937–2022	American stand-up comedian	
Lulu Roman	Bertha Louise Hable	1946–2025	American comedienne and singer	
Max Romeo	Maxwell Smith	1944–2025	Jamaican musician	
Gloria Romero	Gloria Galla	1933–2025	Filipina actress	
Nicky Romero	Nick Rotteveel	1989–	Dutch DJ and record producer	
Sky Rompiendo	Alejandro Ramírez Suárez	1992–	Colombian producer, songwriter and DJ	
Mickey Rooney	Joseph Yule Jr.	1920–2014	American actor	
Buddy Roosevelt	Kenneth Sanderson	1898–1973	American actor	
George Roper	George Furnival	1934–2003	English comedian	
Skid Roper	Richard Banke	1954–	American musician	
Noël Roquevert	Noël Bénévent	1892–1973	French actor	
Angela Ro Ro	Angela Maria Diniz Gonsalves	1949–2025	Brazilian singer-songwriter	
Rosa Rosal	Florence Danon	1928–2025	Filipino actress	
Françoise Rosay	Françoise Bandy de Nalèche	1891–1974	French opera singer	
Axl Rose	William Axl Rose	1962–	American singer and songwriter (Guns N' Roses)	
Billy Rose	William Rosenberg	1899–1966	American impresario and lyricist	
Calypso Rose	Linda Sandy-Lewis (or McCartha Sandy-Lewis)	1940–	Trinidadian singer	Also known as Crusoe Kid
Elena Rose	Andrea Elena Mangiamarchi	1995–	Venezuelan-American singer and songwriter	
Majesty Rose	Majesty Rochelle York	1992–	American singer and songwriter	
Shiva Rose	Shiva Rose Afshar	1969–	American actress	
Bodil Rosing	Bodil Hammerich	1877–1941	Danish-American actress	
Annie Ross	Annabelle Short	1930–2020	English-American singer and actress	
Gaylen Ross	Gail Rosenbaum	1950–	American director, writer, producer and actress	
Jeff Ross	Jeffrey Ross Lifschultz	1965–	American comedian	
Joe E. Ross	Joseph Roszawikz	1914–1982	American actor and comedian	
Rick Ross	William Roberts II	1976–	American rapper	
Shirley Ross	Bernice Gaunt	1913–1975	American actress	
Robert Rossen	Robert Rosen	1908–1996	American screenwriter, film director and producer	
Steve Rossi	Joseph Tafarella	1932–2014	American actor, stand-up comedian and singer	
Ariel Rot	Ariel Rothenberg-Gutkin	1960–	Argentine musician (Tequila)	
Cecilia Roth	Cecilia Rothenberg-Gutkin	1956–	Argentine actress	
Joanna Roth	Joanna Angelis	1965–	Danish-British actress	
Lillian Roth	Lilian Rutstein	1910–1980	American singer and actress	
Deep Roy	Mohinder Purba	1957–	Kenyan-British actor	
Candida Royalle	Candice Vadala	1950–2015	American producer and director	
Prince Royce	Geoffrey Royce Rojas	1989–	American singer	
Phil Rudd	Phillip Rudzevecuis	1954–	Australian drummer (AC/DC)	
Evelyn Rudie	Evelyn Rudie Bernauer	1949–	American playwright and actress	
Sara Rue	Sara Schlackman	1979–	American actress	
Titta Ruffo	Ruffo Titta Cafiero	1877–1953	Italian opera singer	
Bunny Rugs	William Clarke	1948–2014	Jamaican singer (Third World)	
Ja Rule	Jeffrey Atkins	1976–	American rapper and actor	
Rev Run	Joseph Simmons	1964–	American rapper and actor (Run-DMC)	
Jennifer Rush	Heidi Stern	1960–	American singer	
Odeya Rush	Odeya Rushinek	1997–	Israeli actress	
Joseph Ruskin	Joseph Schlafman	1924–2013	American character actor	
Albert Russell	Albert Lerche	1890–1929	American director, screenwriter and actor	
Andy Russell	Andrés Rábago	1919–1992	American singer	
Hal Russell	Harold Luttenbacher	1926–1992	American jazz composer, bandleader and musician	
Leon Russell	Claude Russell Bridges	1942–2016	American musician and songwriter	
Lillian Russell	Helen Leonard	1860/1861–1922	American singer and actress	
Mark Russell	Mark Ruslander	1932–2023	American political satirist and comedian	
Nipsey Russell	Julius Russell	1918–2005	American actor, comedian, poet and dancer	
Theresa Russell	Theresa Paup	1957–	American actress	
William Russell	William Lerche	1884–1929	American actor	
William Russell	William Russell Enoch	1924–2024	English actor	
Kelly Rutherford	Kelly Rutherford Deane	1968–	American actress	
Basil Ruysdael	Basil Millspaugh	1878–1960	American actor and opera singer	
Amy Ryan	Amy Dziewiontkowski	1968–	American actress	
Barry Ryan	Barry Sapherson	1948–2021	English singer and photographer	
Eileen Ryan	Eileen Annucci	1927–2022	American actress	
Kate Ryan	Katrien Verbeeck	1980–	Belgian singer and songwriter	
Matt Ryan	Matthew Evans	1981–	Welsh actor	
Paul Ryan	Bernard Paul Feldman	1945–2015	American actor	
Paul Ryan	Paul Sapherson	1948–1992	English singer, songwriter and record producer	
Sheila Ryan	Katherine McLaughlin	1921–1975	American actress	
Tim Ryan	Timothy Ryan Rouillier	1964–	American country singer-songwriter	
Bobby Rydell	Robert Louis Ridarelli	1942–2022	American singer and actor	
Mark Rydell	Mortimer H. Rydell	1929–2026	American director, producer and actor	
Mitch Ryder	William Sherille Levise Jr.	1945–	American rock singer (The Detroit Wheels)	
Winona Ryder	Winona Laura Horowitz	1971–	American actress	
Michael Rye	John Michael Riorden Billsbury	1918–2012	American actor	
Rye Rye	Ryeisha Berrain	1990–	American rapper, singer, dancer and actress	
Mark Rylance	David Mark Rylance Waters	1960–	English actor	
