= Ritz Brothers =

American comedy trio (1925–1979)

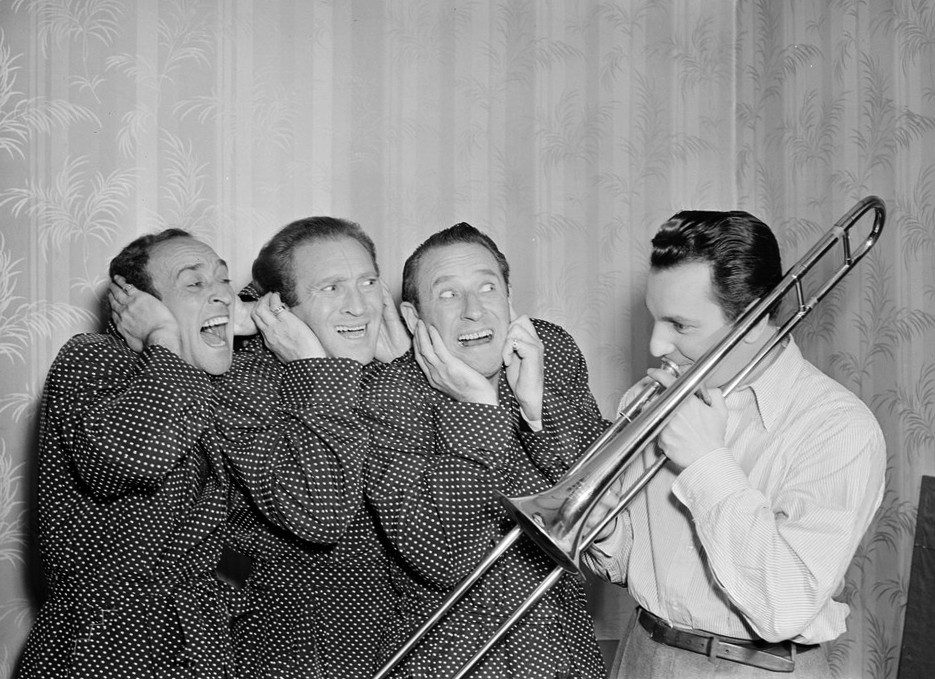
- The Ritz Brothers: L to R; Jimmy Ritz, Harry Ritz, and Al Ritz with Buddy Morrow, 1947

Comedy career
- Years active: 1925–1979
- Medium: Stage, film, television
- Genre: Musical comedy
- Former members: Al Ritz; Jimmy Ritz; Harry Ritz

The Ritz Brothers were an Jewish-American family comedy act consisting of brothers Al (1901–1965), Jimmy (1904–1985), and Harry Ritz (1907–1986) who performed extensively on stage, in nightclubs and in films from 1925 to the late 1970s. A fourth brother, George, acted as their manager.

== Early life ==
The four brothers were born in Newark, New Jersey to Austrian Jewish haberdasher Max Joachim and his wife Pauline. They also had a sister, Gertrude.

Harry explained on a Joe Franklin TV interview that the family name was pronounced "joe-ACK-him", and that eldest brother Al, a vaudeville dancer, adopted a new professional name after he saw the name "Ritz" on the side of a laundry truck. Jimmy and Harry followed suit when the brothers formed a team. The Ritzes emphasized precision dancing in their act, and added comedy material as they went along. By the early 1930s they were stage headliners.

== Movie career ==
In 1934 Educational Pictures, producers of short subjects, hired "The Three Ritz Brothers" to make a series of six two-reel comedies in New York. The first, Hotel Anchovy, did well enough for the film's distributor, 20th Century-Fox, to void the Educational contract and hire the team as a specialty act for feature-length musicals, to be filmed in Hollywood. From 1935 to 1937 the brothers barged in on the action in several musical comedies, including Sing, Baby, Sing, One in a Million, and the Irving Berlin musical On the Avenue. In 1937 Fox gave the Ritz Brothers their own starring series, beginning with Life Begins in College.

The Ritz Brothers gained a large following, with many fans comparing them to the Marx Brothers. Unlike the Marxes, however, the Ritzes did not play three different, contrasting characters; instead, Harry, Jimmy, and Al adopted the same boisterous behavior, making it hard for audiences to tell them apart. The ringleader was always rubber-faced, mouthy Harry, with Jimmy and Al enthusiastically following his lead. They frequently broke into songs and dances during their feature comedies, and often did celebrity impersonations (among them Ted Lewis, Peter Lorre, Tony Martin and even Martin's wife Alice Faye, and Katharine Hepburn). The brothers' popularity was great enough for them to be featured in animated cartoons, including the 1937 Warner Bros. short A Sunbonnet Blue (with a trio of rodents, The Three Ratz Brothers) and the 1939 Walt Disney short The Autograph Hound (with the Ritzes as themselves in caricature).

The Ritz Brothers' talent was also noted by Samuel Goldwyn, who borrowed them from Fox for his Technicolor variety show, The Goldwyn Follies, where they appeared with other headliners of the day including radio's Edgar Bergen and Charlie McCarthy, Phil Baker, and Kenny Baker. Perhaps the Ritz Brothers' most successful film during this period was Fox's 1939 musical-comedy version of The Three Musketeers, their only costume picture, co-starring Don Ameche.

Fox chief Darryl F. Zanuck always viewed Harry Ritz as the true star of the act, with Al and Jimmy as excess baggage. Zanuck's handwritten notes on Ritz scripts insisted that Harry's roles and dialogue should be built up. Zanuck even told Harry what a big star he could be if he only got rid of his brothers. Harry ended the conversation immediately, refusing to consider splitting the act.

== Trouble behind the scenes ==
Harry's forthright refusal of Zanuck's proposal demonstrated how strong-willed the Ritz Brothers were. Harry, Al, and Jimmy approached each project as a united front, and didn't hesitate to object if they were treated unfairly. This went public when Zanuck bought an old Ralph Spence play, The Gorilla (staged in 1925), and forced the Ritzes into a film version co-starring Bela Lugosi and Patsy Kelly. The Ritzes complained about the low quality of the script -- which had no opportunities for musical comedy at all -- and staged a highly publicized walkout. Zanuck responded by completing The Gorilla anyway, with the brothers reluctantly back to film the remaining scenes.

Zanuck terminated the Ritzes' starring series and then featured them in a B picture: Pack Up Your Troubles (1939) where they were billed below the young star Jane Withers. Zanuck then arranged to loan the Ritzes out to Republic Pictures, a minor-league studio best known for low-budget westerns and serials. The Ritz Brothers were supposed to star in The Hit Parade of 1940 but, reluctant to work for the small studio, they bought back their contract and walked away from the deal. This action ended their associations with both Fox and Republic, leaving the brothers temporarily unemployed.

In October 1939, on the heels of the failed Republic deal, RKO Radio Pictures expressed interest in a one-picture agreement, but it fell through. The Ritzes then moved to Universal Pictures, where they were signed in February 1940 to star in The Boys from Syracuse, but producer Jules Levey dropped them from that production. The Ritz Brothers felt the dismissal was unjustified and took their case to arbitration. This was called off within 48 hours "by mutual consent", and Universal honored the Ritzes' contract by casting them in one of their upcoming musical comedies, Argentine Nights (1940). The film was meant to start production in May 1940, but the casting of the brothers meant the script had to be rewritten. Filming was pushed back until June 10.

== Films for Universal ==
Argentine Nights was a moderately budgeted feature that introduced The Andrews Sisters to the screen. It was also the first feature-film credit of two songwriting teams: Don Raye & Hughie Prince, and Sammy Cahn & Saul Chaplin. Two years later, the brothers returned to Universal to make three brash, lower-budgeted musical comedies, each running an hour long: Behind the Eight Ball (1942), Hi'ya, Chum (1943), and Never a Dull Moment (1943). Then the Ritzes quit Hollywood, leaving their next B project behind; it was ultimately filmed, with the script unchanged and their roles taken by women, as Murder in the Blue Room (1944).

== Nightclubs and television ==
The Ritz Brothers now concentrated on their nightclub act and personal appearances. In June 1943 they played a weeklong engagement at the Shangri-La in Philadelphia. They participated in an all-star gala, "The Night of Stars", held at Madison Square Garden on November 16, 1943. The following week they were headlining the stage show at New York's Roxy Theatre.

In the 1950s they made guest appearances on network television (including All Star Revue, a 1952 comedy hour broadcast live, in which the Ritzes dominated the action and earned rave reviews). They soon became a top Las Vegas attraction. In 1958 Harry, without his brothers, participated in a sketch-comedy LP, Hilarity in Hi-Fi (in stereo; the monaural version was titled Hilarity in Hollywood). A 1961 episode of What's My Line? had the three brothers as mystery guests. Panelist Joey Bishop unexpectedly disqualified himself, explaining later: "I called the International Restaurant where the Ritz Brothers are appearing, and wanted to know what time the first show would be over. And the headwaiter said 'It'll be over by 10:00 because the Ritz Brothers are going on early, they're doing What's My Line? tonight."

The Ritzes were appearing at the New Orleans Roosevelt Hotel in December of 1965 when Al died of a sudden heart attack. Harry and Jimmy were devastated, as the trio had always been close. The two surviving brothers continued the act and still commanded large salaries and audiences. "It was tough getting back into the act after Al died," said Harry, "There never was any doubt that Jimmy and I would continue, but we just had to work up to it." Jimmy added, "For nearly 40 years Al would toss me the lines, and for the first few days, I'd keep waiting for Al to toss the line." The revised act had Jimmy taking both Al's lines and his own, and Harry concluding each show by saying "Thank you... from the three of us." Syndicated columnist Dan Lewis remarked, "They still sing and dance for an hour and 20 minutes with as much spryness as they did 30 and 40 years ago."

Harry and Jimmy appeared together in only two more films. The last appearances of the Ritz Brothers as a team (minus Al) were in the mid-1970s films Blazing Stewardesses and Won Ton Ton, the Dog Who Saved Hollywood, a spoof of the Hollywood career of Rin Tin Tin. In Blazing Stewardesses the Ritzes replaced The Three Stooges, who dropped out when Moe Howard's declining health forced the Stooges to withdraw. (Contrary to many accounts, Moe was alive when Blazing Stewardesses was filmed in March 1975 but was too ill to work, and died in May of that year; Blazing Stewardesses began production a month later, in June of 1975.) Harry and Jimmy made semi-regular appearances on the 1970 television revival of the comedy-themed game show, Can You Top This? and made a lively encore appearance on television, as guests on Dick Cavett's PBS talk show.

In 1979, television producer Garry Marshall (Happy Days, Laverne & Shirley) prepared an American version of the British sitcom Are You Being Served? The British series was set in the venerable Grace Bros. department store, owned by the elderly Mr. Grace (Harold Bennett). The American adaptation, retitled Beane's of Boston, cast Harry Ritz as the owner, Mr. Beane. In the pilot, which did not sell, Tom Poston plays the role and Harry Ritz does not appear.

Harry's final months were plagued by Alzheimer's disease; Jimmy Ritz died in 1985 shortly before Harry, but Harry's health was so delicate that he was never told of his brother's death. Harry died five months later.

The brothers were entombed in Hollywood Cemetery, now called the Hollywood Forever Cemetery in Hollywood, California. They are entombed near each other in the Hall of David Mausoleum.

== Tributes ==
The influence of the Ritz Brothers was greater than their film career, in part because of their long career as nightclub entertainers. They influenced actors including Danny Kaye, Jerry Lewis, and Sid Caesar. In his 1976 film Silent Movie, Mel Brooks paid tribute to the Ritz Brothers by casting Harry in a cameo (he is the fellow leaving a tailor's shop). It was the actor's last role.

In a 1976 Esquire article, Harry Stein makes the case that many top comedians were influenced by, and even borrowed bits from, Harry Ritz. In an interview in Playboy magazine, George Carlin said Harry Ritz "invented the moves for a whole generation" of comedians.

Other tributes to them include mentions in The Simpsons (episode "Mountain of Madness"), M*A*S*H (episode "Aid Station"), Soap (TV series) (episode 48), and the films Pretty Woman, Mr. Saturday Night and My Favorite Year: "On the funny side, there's the Marx Brothers, except Zeppo, the Ritz Brothers, no exceptions, both Laurel and Hardy, and Woody Woodpecker." Another tribute to The Ritz Brothers appeared in Leave It to Beaver (Season 6, Episode 30, "The Book Report"), where elementary-school student Beaver writes a book report about The Three Musketeers based on the Ritz Brothers movie of the same name.

They received a star on the Hollywood Walk of Fame in 1987, in response to a campaign led by comedians Jan Murray, Red Buttons, Milton Berle, and Phyllis Diller. In 1996, a Golden Palm Star on the Palm Springs, California, Walk of Stars was dedicated to them.

They were the favorite musical clowns of the German-Jewish poet Else Lasker-Schüler, and they appear as characters in her last play, I and I (Ich und Ich).

Norman Lear has said of Harry Ritz and the Ritz Brothers, "Harry Ritz was as funny as any human being, in or out of comedy, I have ever [met]... he was a jewel, in a glorious setting, and his brothers were the setting."

== Filmography ==
=== The Ritz Brothers films ===
Harry, Jimmy, and Al Ritz

Year	Movie
1934	Hotel Anchovy (short subject)
1936	Sing, Baby, Sing
1937	Cinema Circus (cameo appearance in short subject, in Technicolor)
1937	One in a Million
1937	On the Avenue
1937	You Can't Have Everything
1937	Life Begins in College (first starring feature film)
1937	Ali Baba Goes to Town (cameo appearance)
1938	The Goldwyn Follies
1938	Kentucky Moonshine
1938	Straight, Place and Show
1939	The Three Musketeers
1939	The Gorilla
1939	Pack Up Your Troubles starring Jane Withers
1940	Argentine Nights co-starring The Andrews Sisters
1942	Behind the Eight Ball
1943	Hi'ya, Chum
1943	Show-Business at War (March of Time short subject)
1943	Never a Dull Moment
1956	Brooklyn Goes to Las Vegas (short subject)

Harry and Jimmy Ritz

1975	Blazing Stewardesses
1976	Won Ton Ton, the Dog Who Saved Hollywood

Harry Ritz, solo

Year	Movie
1976	Silent Movie
