= Argentine Nights =

1940 film by Albert S. Rogell

- Directed by: Albert S. Rogell
- Written by: Arthur T. Horman, Sid Kuller, and Ray Golden (screenplay); J. Robert Bren and Gladys Atwater (story); Olive Cooper and Paul Gerard Smith (additional dialogue)
- Produced by: Ken Goldsmith
- Starring: The Ritz Brothers; The Andrews Sisters; Constance Moore; George Reeves
- Cinematography: Elwood Bredell
- Edited by: Frank Gross
- Music by: Charles Previn
- Production company: Universal Pictures
- Distributed by: Universal Pictures
- Release date: 1940
- Running time: 75 minutes
- Country: United States
- Language: English

Argentine Nights is a 1940 musical comedy film directed by Albert S. Rogell and starring The Ritz Brothers and The Andrews Sisters. It was the Andrews trio's first film.

== Plot ==
The Ritz Brothers owe money to their investor creditors, and their biggest asset is an all-girl orchestra featuring the Andrews Sisters. To make good on their debts, the Ritzes book the band into a new luxury hotel in Argentina. Upon their arrival, they find a humble lodging whose owners have been swindled; the improvements to the hotel were never made. The Ritz Brothers and the band resolve to launch the hotel in style. Meanwhile, polo champion Eduardo Esteban poses as the notorious outlaw El Tigre, to romance bandleader Bonnie Brooks and to plan a surprise fiesta at the hotel.

== Cast ==
- Al Ritz as himself
- Harry Ritz as himself
- Jimmy Ritz as himself
- Maxene Andrews as herself
- Patty Andrews as herself
- LaVerne Andrews as herself
- Constance Moore as Bonnie Brooks
- George Reeves as Eduardo Esteban, alias El Tigre
- Peggy Moran as Peggy
- Anne Nagel as Linda
- Kathryn Adams as Carol
- Ferike Boros as Mama Viejos
- Paul Porcasi as Papa Viejos

== Production ==
The Ritz Brothers appeared in Argentine Nights as part of a settlement with Universal after being dropped from Jules Levey's production of The Boys from Syracuse (1940). The film was meant to start production in May 1940, but the casting of the brothers meant the script had to be rewritten and shooting pushed back until June 10. The original songs were written by two teams: Sammy Cahn and Saul Chaplin, and Don Raye and Hughie Prince. George Reeves also sings in the film.

== Reception ==
Film Daily gave the film a good sendoff: "Like two sets of football backfields, The Ritz Brothers and The Andrews Sisters alternate in lugging the entertainment leather in this one. The accent is almost wholly on rampant fun. Highlights of the avalanche of comedy are an imitation of The Andrews Sisters by The Ritz Brothers, and a hilarious bit wherein the boys [in a ship's galley] appropriate a gigantic loaf of sandwich bread, cut it horizontally, and feast from the ensuing gargantuan morsel. Pace generally is swift and amusing, fitted to a mood so light and dizzy that the troubles of the world seem as far distant as Mars."

"What do you expect from a movie?" asked Modern Screen. "If it's sense -- stay home, don't see this one. If it's fun, well then, this is your dish. The story? That doesn't make any sense? Well, neither does the picture. But who cares? The Ritz Brothers are pretty funny and the Andrews Sisters are red hot. And Connie Moore is an eyeful. There are a half dozen good songs which you'll be hearing on your favorite jukebox this winter. Swing it, men!"

== Aftermath ==
Argentine Nights was intended as a harmless musical comedy, but the Argentine government was affronted by the frivolous depiction of the country and its officers of the law. A formal objection was filed in May 1941, almost a year after the film had been produced. Universal withdrew the film from Argentina immediately, with a studio spokesman explaining that "the unfavorable reception was obviously inspired by unfriendly interests in Buenos Aires." Film Daily traced the objection to the mayor of Buenos Aires.

== Revival ==
Realart Pictures, which had acquired the Universal backlog, re-released Argentine Nights in 1948 as part of a double feature with Olsen and Johnson's Hellzapoppin'.
