= Hal Borne =

American songwriter (1911–2000)

- Born: December 26, 1911
- Died: February 25, 2000 (aged 88)
- Education: University of Illinois

Hal Borne (December 26, 1911, Chicago, Illinois - February 25, 2000, Tarzana, California) was an American popular song composer, orchestra leader, music arranger and musical director, who studied music at the University of Illinois. He often collaborated with lyricists Sid Kuller and Ray Golden, including songs for the Marx Brothers ("Sing While You Sell") and Tony Martin ("Tenement Symphony").

== Career ==
At the beginning of his career, Hal Borne worked for RKO Radio Pictures as a rehearsal pianist for Fred Astaire. He later contributed to several Fred Astaire-Ginger Rogers musicals, arranging songs by Jerome Kern and Irving Berlin. Borne was credited with creating the three-note obbligato used in Berlin's song "Cheek to Cheek" in the 1935 film Top Hat.

In 1941, Borne collaborated with Duke Ellington, Paul Francis Webster, and Kuller on the revue Jump for Joy, an all-Black musical production. The revue received support from several figures in Hollywood, including Groucho Marx, Mickey Rooney, and Orson Welles. During the early 1940s, Borne worked as a bandleader and, in February 1942, signed on as music director for RCM's Soundies, short musical films produced for visual jukeboxes.

Borne joined ASCAP in 1942 and contributed as a composer to Ray Golden's 1950 revue Alive and Kicking, which featured performers such as Jack Cassidy, Bobby Van and Carl Reiner, and marked the debut of Gwen Verdon. He later worked extensively with singer Tony Martin, serving as music director for Martin’s live and television appearances throughout the 1950s and 1960s. Borne composed the score for the film Not Tonight Henry (1960) and wrote most of the songs for Promises! Promises! (1963), a film starring Jayne Mansfield and Marie (the Body) McDonald. His other film credits include The Explosive Generation (1961), Flight of the Lost Balloon (1961), and Hillbillys in a Haunted House (1967).

Borne was known for his work as a pianist and collaborated on occasion with Duke Ellington on the spinet. He also supported Marie McDonald's 1957 album "The Body Sings".
