= The Gorilla (1939 film) =

1939 film by Allan Dwan

- Promotional release poster
- Directed by: Allan Dwan
- Written by: Rian James; Sid Silvers
- Based on: The Gorilla; 1925 play by Ralph Spence
- Produced by: Harry Joe Brown
- Starring: Al Ritz; Harry Ritz; Jimmy Ritz; Anita Louise; Patsy Kelly; Lionel Atwill; Bela Lugosi; Joseph Calleia; Edward Norris; Wally Vernon
- Cinematography: Edward Cronjager
- Edited by: Allen McNeil
- Music by: David Buttolph; David Raksin; Cyril J. Mockridge; Alfred Newman
- Production company: 20th Century-Fox
- Distributed by: 20th Century-Fox
- Release date: May 26, 1939
- Running time: 66 minutes
- Country: United States
- Language: English
- Budget: $175,000

The Gorilla

The Gorilla is a 1939 American comedy horror film starring the Ritz Brothers, Anita Louise, Art Miles, Lionel Atwill, Bela Lugosi, and Patsy Kelly. It was based on the 1925 play of the same name by Ralph Spence.

The film is in the public domain.

In the film, investigators are hired to protect a wealthy man from a gorilla-themed killer, but they instead encounter an actual gorilla.

== Plot ==
When wealthy businessman Walter Stevens (Lionel Atwill) receives a death threat from a mysterious killer known as "the Gorilla", he hires the bumbling Ritz Brothers, a team of inept private detectives, to protect him. As a violent storm rolls in and power outages darken his mansion, a real escaped gorilla begins to terrorize the household. Amid the chaos, suspicious characters emerge — including the creepy butler Peters (Bela Lugosi) and a nervous maid (Patsy Kelly) — leaving everyone to wonder whether the threat is a human murderer or something far more beastly. The film combines elements of mystery, horror, and slapstick comedy as the detectives scramble to solve the case before it is too late.

== Cast ==
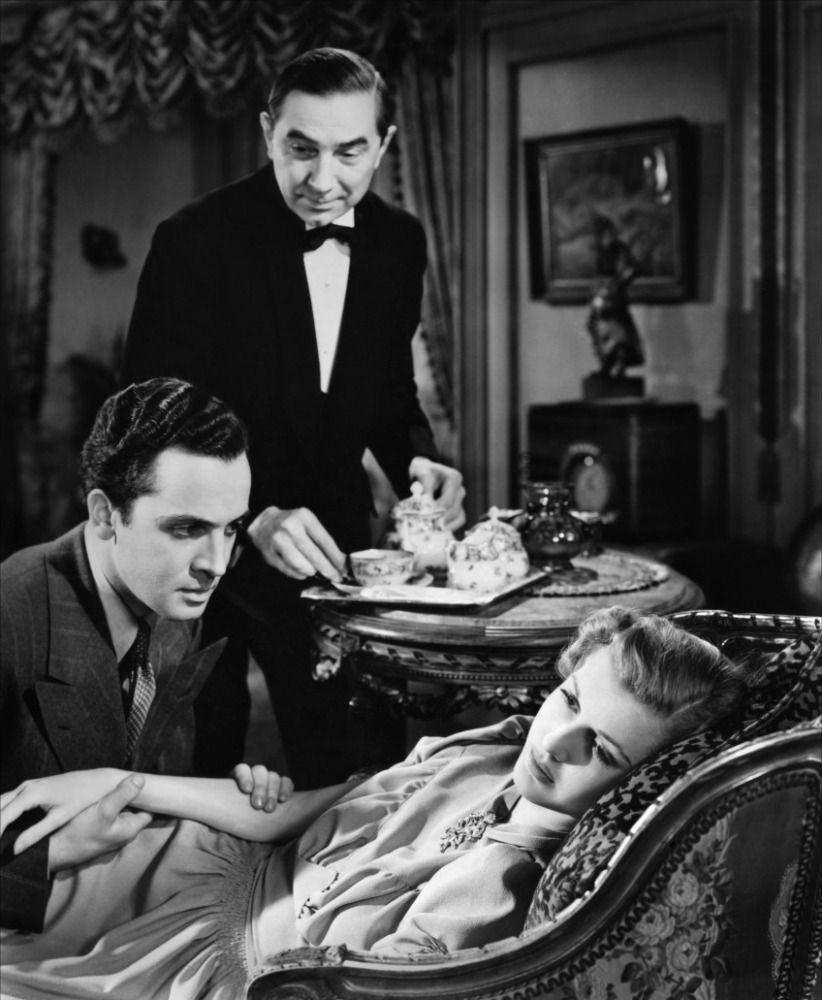
From left to right: Edward Norris, Bela Lugosi, and Anita Louise in The Gorilla

- Jimmy Ritz as Garrity
- Anita Louise as Norma Denby
- Harry Ritz as Harrigan
- Al Ritz as Mulligan
- Patsy Kelly as Kitty
- Lionel Atwill as Walter Stevens
- Bela Lugosi as Peters
- Joseph Calleia as the Stranger
- Edward Norris as Jack Marsden
- Wally Vernon as a Seaman
- Paul Harvey as Conway
- Art Miles as Poe the Gorilla

== Production ==
By October 1938, 20th Century-Fox bought the rights to Ralph Spence's play The Gorilla. Fox wanted production on the film to start in January, which would be when the Ritz brothers finished their tour. The studio wanted Kane Richmond to play a part in the film, but Richmond was replaced by Edward Norris after Richmond signed on for the film Charlie Chan in Reno. Fox signed on Bela Lugosi for the film as the butler. This character was originally meant for Peter Lorre.

The death of the Ritz Brothers' father caused production of the film in January to be delayed. Fox placed a $150,000 suit against the Ritz brothers for a breach of contract, as the film was stated to start production on January 30, but was halted when the Ritz brothers did not show up. They were reluctant to appear in a B picture. By March, the film began shooting again with the Ritz brothers returning to the film. The Gorilla became the last film made for Fox by the Ritz brothers.

== Release and reception ==
The Gorilla was in theaters on May 18, 1939. A negative review of the film was written in The New York Times stating, "It's all supposed to be either really funny or shockingly thrilling, depending on how you look at it. We couldn't see it either way." Describing the Ritz Brothers performance in the film as "perhaps best appreciated by those who find the antics of The Three Stooges to be of too high an order of wit," critic Craig Butler wrote in AllMovie that "shameless scenery chewing from Patsy Kelly ... can't distract from the baldness of some of the plot machinations or from the fact that many of the comic moments are shoehorned in with little rhyme or reason." Writing for Turner Classic Movies, critic Jeff Stafford described the film as "interesting primarily for Lugosi's tongue-in-cheek performance," but that the Ritz brothers "come off like a poor man's version of the Marx brothers" and that "Patsy Kelly's shrill performance as the terrified maid can also grate on your nerves."
