= You Can't Have Everything =

1937 film by Norman Taurog

- Theatrical Poster
- Directed by: Norman Taurog
- Screenplay by: Harry Tugend; Karl Tunberg; Jack Yellen
- Story by: Gregory Ratoff
- Produced by: Darryl F. Zanuck
- Starring: Alice Faye; Don Ameche
- Cinematography: Lucien N. Andriot
- Edited by: Hanson T. Fritch
- Music by: Mack Gordon
- Distributed by: 20th Century Fox
- Release date: August 3, 1937
- Running time: 100 minutes
- Country: United States
- Language: English

You Can't Have Everything is a 1937 American musical film directed by Norman Taurog and produced by Darryl F. Zanuck. The film stars Alice Faye and Don Ameche, and was the film debut for Gypsy Rose Lee credited as Louise Hovick part of her birth name.

== Plot ==
Judith Poe Wells is a would-be playwright who has almost no money. As a result of ordering a meal in a restaurant where she cannot afford to pay, she meets George Macrae, a musical writer with a lot of power. He offers her play North Winds to producer Sam Woods. He knows it isn't any good, but he has fallen in love with her and does it to win her over.

== Cast ==
- Alice Faye as Judith Poe Wells
- Don Ameche as George Macrae
- Al Ritz as Al Ritz
- Jimmy Ritz as Jimmy Ritz
- Harry Ritz as Harry Ritz
- Charles Winninger as Sam Gordon
- Gypsy Rose Lee as Lulu Riley
- Arthur Treacher as Bevins
- Tony Martin as Bobby Walker
- David Rubinoff as Rubinoff and His Violin
- Consuelo Harris as Dancer
- Tip, Tap and Toe

== Soundtrack ==
- You Can't Have Everything
  - Sung by Alice Faye; reprised by The Ritz Brothers, Composer: M. Gordon, H. Revel
- Chopsticks
  - Performed by The Ritz Brothers
- Danse Rubinoff
  - Instrumental, written and played by David Rubinoff
- Long Underwear
  - Sung and danced by The Ritz Brothers and chorus
- The Loveliness of You
  - Sung by Tony Martin
- Afraid to Dream
  - Sung by Don Ameche; reprised by Alice Faye, Tony Martin, chorus
- Please Pardon Us - We're in Love
  - Sung by Alice Faye; reprised by her, Don Ameche, Charles Winninger, The Ritz Brothers
- Rhythm on the Radio
  - Danced by "Tip, Tap and Toe"
- North Pole Sketch
  - Performed by The Ritz Brothers, Tony Martin, others

Other releases

Doris Day recorded the title track "You Can't Have Everything" by M. Gordon, H. Revel in 1960, along with "A Hundred Years From Today" by J. Young, N. Washington, V. Young, and "What Every Girl Should Know" by R. Wells, D. Holt and "Mood Indigo" by D. Ellington, I. Mills, A. Bigard

== Critical reception ==
Motion Picture Herald commented, "The musicals that Darryl F. Zanuck has been turning out with regularity don't seem to win any spectacular medals. Still, they do what pictures are supposed to do, prove popular entertainment and make money" and this film "will prove as worthy as its predecessors." It continued to say that while the film used "formula musical comedy elements", the cast "acquit themselves credibly" and Louise Hovick's film debut was handled "with good taste and skill."

Modern Screen’s Leo Townsend commented that You Can't Have Everything was created by the same team behind Wake Up and Live, and, because "the story is highly unimportant", audiences who liked one would also like the other. He discussed the cast : Alice Faye ("making rapid strides in her histrionics as well as her vocal work"), Don Ameche ("does a first rate job in spite of the fact that the make-up department did strange things with his eyebrows"), The Ritz Brothers ("very funny") and Gypsy Rose Lee, who was billed as Louise Hovick ("didn't seem a bit embarrassed at having to wear clothes, and carried off her role with high humor.")

Photoplay wrote that the film was a good example of the "gay, slyly suggestive, amusing comedies ... eminently 1937 in flavor, it presents a truly sure-fire plot in a frivolous what-the-hell kind of dress." It praised the music and the performances of the main cast and highlighted the debut of Louise Hovick (Gypsy Rose Lee) commenting "the big surprise is fully clothed Louise Hovick. Not only is she a good actress but she has created a new character; sympathetic, rather funny, female heavy."
