= Silent Movie =

1976 American satirical comedy film by Mel Brooks

- Theatrical release poster by John Alvin
- Directed by: Mel Brooks
- Screenplay by: Mel Brooks; Ron Clark; Rudy De Luca; Barry Levinson
- Story by: Ron Clark
- Produced by: Michael Hertzberg
- Starring: Mel Brooks; Marty Feldman; Dom DeLuise; Sid Caesar; Harold Gould; Ron Carey; Bernadette Peters
- Cinematography: Paul Lohmann
- Edited by: Stanford C. Allen; John C. Howard
- Music by: John Morris
- Production company: Crossbow Productions
- Distributed by: 20th Century Fox
- Release date: June 17, 1976
- Running time: 87 minutes
- Country: United States
- Language: Silent film with English intertitles
- Budget: $4 million
- Box office: $36.1 million

Silent Movie is a 1976 American satirical silent comedy film co-written, directed by and starring Mel Brooks, released by 20th Century Fox in summer 1976. The ensemble cast includes Dom DeLuise, Marty Feldman, Bernadette Peters and Sid Caesar, with cameos by Anne Bancroft, Liza Minnelli, Burt Reynolds, James Caan, Marcel Marceau and Paul Newman as themselves, and character cameos by Harry Ritz of the Ritz Brothers, Charlie Callas and Henny Youngman. The film was produced in the manner of an early-20th-century silent film, with intertitles instead of spoken dialogue; the soundtrack consists almost entirely of orchestral accompaniment and sound effects. It is an affectionate parody of slapstick comedies, including those of Charlie Chaplin, Mack Sennett and Buster Keaton. The film satirizes the film industry, presenting the story of a film producer trying to obtain studio support to make a silent film in the 1970s.

== Plot ==
Mel Funn, a once-great Hollywood film director, is now recovering from a drinking problem and down on his luck. He and his sidekicks, Marty Eggs and Dom Bell, want to make the first silent movie in 40 years and Funn pitches the idea to the chief of Big Picture Studios. The chief rejects the idea at first but Funn convinces him that if he can get Hollywood's biggest stars to be in the film, it could save the studio from a takeover by New York conglomerate Engulf & Devour.

Funn, Eggs and Bell proceed to recruit various stars for the film. They surprise Burt Reynolds in his shower and revisit his mansion in disguise. They recruit James Caan filming on location, following slapstick fumbling in an unstable dressing room trailer. They find Liza Minnelli at the studio commissary, where she eagerly agrees to be in the film. They recruit Anne Bancroft by disguising themselves as nightclub Flamenco dancers. While visiting the ailing studio chief in the hospital, Funn phones mime artist Marcel Marceau, who responds in French with the only spoken word in the film: a resounding "Non!" Bell asks, "What did he say?" Funn responds, "I don't know. I don't understand French!" They see Paul Newman on the hospital grounds and sign him to the film after a wild electric-wheelchair chase.

In the course of their search for stars, the trio have a number of brief misadventures, including a mix-up between a seeing-eye dog and an untrained look-alike, several (mostly unsuccessful) efforts by Eggs to approach various women and a Coca-Cola vending machine that launches cans like grenades.

Engulf & Devour learn of the project and try to sabotage it by sending voluptuous nightclub sensation Vilma Kaplan to seduce Funn. He falls for her but returns to drinking when he learns that she was part of a scheme. He buys a huge bottle of liquor and drinks himself into a stupor, surrounded by fellow "winos". Kaplan has genuinely fallen for Funn and refused Engulf & Devour's money; she helps Eggs and Bell find him and restore him to sobriety.

The film is completed but the only copy is stolen by Engulf & Devour just before its theatrical premiere. Kaplan stalls the audience with her nightclub act, while Funn, Eggs and Bell successfully steal the film back. They are cornered by Engulf & Devour's thuggish executives but use the Coke machine they encountered earlier to attack and subdue them with exploding cans. Lacking a separate spool to rewind the film, Eggs winds the film around his own body and upon returning to the theater he has to be rushed to the projection booth to show it.

The film is a huge success with the audience, which erupts with over-the-top applause. The studio is saved and Funn, Eggs, Bell, Kaplan and Chief celebrate, as an onscreen caption identifies the film as a "true story".

== Cast ==
- Mel Brooks as Mel Funn
- Marty Feldman as Marty Eggs
- Dom DeLuise as Dom Bell
- Bernadette Peters as Vilma Kaplan
- Sid Caesar as Studio Chief
- Burt Reynolds as himself
- James Caan as himself
- Liza Minnelli as herself
- Anne Bancroft as herself
- Marcel Marceau as himself
- Paul Newman as himself
- Harold Gould as Engulf
- Ron Carey as Devour
- Carol Arthur as Pregnant Lady
- Liam Dunn as Newsvendor
- Fritz Feld as Maitre d'
- Chuck McCann as Studio Gate Guard
- Valerie Curtin as Intensive Care Nurse
- Yvonne Wilder as Studio Chief's Secretary
- Arnold Soboloff as Acupuncture Man
- Patrick Campbell as Motel Bellhop
- Harry Ritz as Man at Tailor Shop
- Charlie Callas as Blind Man
- Henny Youngman as Fly-in-soup Man
- Eddie Ryder as British Officer
- Al Hopson as Executive
- Rudy De Luca as Executive
- Barry Levinson as Executive
- Lee Delano as Executive
- Jack Riley as Executive
- Inga Neilsen as Beautiful Blonde No. 1
- Erica Hagen as Beautiful Blonde No. 2
- Robert Lussier as Projectionist
- Phil Leeds as Rio Bomba Waiter (uncredited)

== Analysis ==
Mel Brooks enjoyed success with the release of Blazing Saddles and Young Frankenstein in 1974, both being parodies of entire genres. He followed this success with Silent Movie, an affectionate parody of the slapstick films of the silent film era. Prior to the release of Silent Movie, That's Entertainment!, a documentary about the golden age of Metro-Goldwyn-Mayer musicals, had been the most successful film for MGM in 1974. The success of the documentary on the topic of the golden era of cinema may have been an inspiration for a parody.

Brooks was planning the movie eight months before it began filming in January 1976. "It will be the noisiest silent movie ever made," said Brooks. "I'm going to have a lot of superstars. They don't leave me alone. Jimmy Caan called and said he'd be very mad if he's not in it. Why a silent movie in 1975, you are about to ask me? Because we can take advantage of all the technology and inventions, and the ways of life since 1925. A lot has happened. We have Coke machines now!" True to his word, he worked a Coke machine into the script. The working titles were Silent Movies Madness, Mel Brooks's Silent Movies, and The Silent Movies of Mel Brooks.

Silent Movie feels like a throwback to this earlier era, despite using color and other up-to-date techniques. As a film about filmmaking, Silent Movie also parodies "Hollywood deal-making". Cowriter Ron Clark was previously the producer of The Tim Conway Comedy Hour, while Rudy De Luca and Barry Levinson were writers for The Carol Burnett Show. Unsurprisingly, the humor of Silent Movie would not be out of place in a sketch comedy. Henry Jenkins points out that for Brooks, the decision to make a silent comedy represents an allusion to an earlier era of his career. He used to be a writer for Your Show of Shows, a show that included pantomime segments and parodies of silent films. Television audiences of the 1950s were familiar with the silents through their broadcast on late night television.

The film features an unflattering portrayal of the film industry. Big Picture Studios' front gate sign boasts of the multimillion-dollar scope of their films, never mentioning their quality. The film project is greenlit not on the merits of its script but solely on the drawing power of the movie stars attached. Executives cannot tell good film footage apart from bad, while the current studio chief (Sid Caesar) is one box-office bomb away from losing his position. The studio is under threat of a takeover by a "soulless" conglomerate. The movie stars are portrayed as vain figures who flaunt their wealth. The moviegoing audience is portrayed as fickle and unpredictable. Villainous Engulf & Devour is a parody of real-life conglomerate Gulf and Western Industries, which had acquired Paramount Pictures. The film also parodies corporate executives as essentially interchangeable yes-men, following the whims of their boss. The logo of Big Picture Studios is a parody of the MGM logo. Instead of the majestic, roaring Leo the Lion, it shows the studio chief as a braying donkey, and MGM's "Ars Gratia Artis" slogan ("art for art's sake") is parodied with "Ars Est Pecunia" ("art is money").

The film is literally silent for the first couple of minutes, as the shots establishing the main characters have no sound at all. Fortunately for the audience, the entire movie is not an exercise in silence, as the orchestra strikes up when the 20th Century-Fox logo appears on a billboard, just before the main title. Some of the gags do rely on the music and sound effects. For instance, a scene showing the New York City skyline begins with the song, "San Francisco", only to have it come to a sudden stop, as the musicians realize they're playing the wrong music. They then go into "I'll Take Manhattan" instead. One joke makes use of the difference between the expressive gestures of silent cinema and those used in guessing games, such as charades. A secretary (Yvonne Wilder) attempts to explain to the studio chief that Mel Funn (Brooks) has a drinking problem, by pantomiming an uplifted bottle. Her boss misunderstands, figuring that Funn sucks his thumb. Another scene with the studio chief pays homage to slapstick; the chief proclaims slapstick to be dead, then his chair flips backwards and sends him sliding across the room in it. He slams his head, with the sound of a bell ringing. The humor of the scene derives from the combination of the image and the unlikely sound. Many of the gags of the film actually depend on careful synchronizations of sound and image. For example, one sequence has Marty Eggs (Marty Feldman) tossed about between elevator doors. It is set to the sounds of a pinball machine.

Other gags are delivered through intertitles. For example, in a meeting of Engulf (Harold Gould) & Devour (Ron Carey), an underling (Jack RIley) whispers something into Engulf's ear. The intertitles report: "whisper...whisper...whisper". Engulf fails to understand, forcing the man to shout. In response the intertitle is written in capital letters: "YOUR FLY IS OPEN!" Marcel Marceau reprises his "walking into the wind" routine. Part of the mime satire is that the mime's props are actual instead of imaginary: a door that he strains to open; a strong wind he is struggling against and a telephone that he picks up. Liza Minnelli appears in a scene that makes no use of her dancing talents. Writer Robert Alan Crick, author of The Big Screen Comedies of Mel Brooks (2002), points out that the part could have easily been played by any well-known actress of the 1970s, with no apparent difference. The film was the first notable acting role for Brooks, who was previously limited to offscreen voiceovers and short cameos.

== Reception ==
Reviews were largely very good, with the more critical ones commenting on the hit-and-miss assortment of jokes, but all of them agreed that the film offered some good gags and an evening's entertainment. Ron Pennington of The Hollywood Reporter raved, "Mel Brooks has reached a new peak in his career with Silent Movie, which must be ranked as one of the funniest film comedies since the advent of sound [and] easily Brooks's best effort to date (no mean achievement). Brooks, Feldman, and DeLuise are simply brilliant together, performing in the best slapstick tradition of classic comedy teams." Variety wrote, "An almost nonstop parade of sight gags... the brisk 86-minute pic works surprisingly well. Several chase scenes are sure laugh-getters, and Harry Ritz, Charlie Callas, Henry Youngman, and the late Liam Dunn are standouts in a long array of amusing bit players."

Roger Ebert of the Chicago Sun-Times gave the film four stars out of four, and called it "not only funny, but fun". He cited as positive elements the ability of Brooks to do anything for a laugh, and the world of his films, in which everything is possible. He stated that Brooks took "a considerable stylistic risk" that he managed to pull off "triumphantly". He considered the film equal in comedic ability to Blazing Saddles, superior to Young Frankenstein but inferior to The Producers. He also praised the film for offering an encyclopedia worth of visual gags, both old and new. Gene Siskel of the Chicago Tribune gave the film three stars out of four, and wrote that it offered "a number of laughs", and felt that the unbilled cameos were as "refreshing as they are brief". Charles Champlin of the Los Angeles Times wrote, "Some of the bits and pieces work better than others, but so many work so clownishly, zanily, idiotically well that Silent Movie is certain to have the year's noisiest audiences."

A few reviews were milder. Vincent Canby of The New York Times wrote that the film can be enjoyed as "a virtually uninterrupted series of smiles" but "doesn't contain a single moment that ever seriously threatens to split the sides". Gary Arnold of The Washington Post called the film "a misbegotten but tolerably amusing novelty item".

On Rotten Tomatoes, the film has an approval rating of 80%, based on 30 reviews, with an average rating of 6.8/10. The critical consensus reads: "Stylistically audacious and infectiously nostalgic for the dawn of cinema, Silent Movie is another comedic triumph for Mel Brooks... now shush." On Metacritic, the film has a score of 75 out of 100, based on reviews from 7 critics. It earned North American rentals of $21,240,000.

== Awards and nominations ==
Award	Category	Subject	Result
Golden Globe Awards	Best Picture – Comedy or Musical	Silent Movie	Nominated
Golden Globe Awards	Best Actor in a Comedy or Musical	Mel Brooks	Nominated
Golden Globe Awards	Best Supporting Actor	Marty Feldman	Nominated
Golden Globe Awards	Best Supporting Actress	Bernadette Peters	Nominated
Writers Guild of America Awards	Best Comedy Written Directly for the Screen	Mel Brooks, Ron Clark, Rudy De Luca, Barry Levinson	Nominated

== Home media ==
The DVD contains audio tracks in English, Spanish and French, even though the film's only spoken line, "Non" (French for "No"), sounds almost identical in all three languages. The DVD also includes English subtitles.

== Sources ==
- Crick, Robert Alan (2002), "Silent Movie (1976)", The Big Screen Comedies of Mel Brooks, McFarland & Company, ISBN 978-0786443260
- Ebert, Roger (2007), "Silent Movie", Roger Ebert's Four Star Reviews--1967-2007, Andrews McMeel Publishing, ISBN 978-0740792175
- Jenkins, Henry (2013), "Mel Brooks, Vulgar Modernism, and Comic Remediation", in Horton, Andrew; Rapf, Joanna E. (eds.), A Companion to Film Comedy, John Wiley & Sons, ISBN 978-1118327852
