= Life Begins in College =

1937 film directed by William A. Seiter

- Directed by: William A. Seiter
- Written by: Don Ettlinger; Karl Tunberg
- Produced by: Harry Wilson
- Starring: The Ritz Brothers; Joan Davis; Tony Martin; Gloria Stuart
- Cinematography: Robert H. Planck
- Edited by: Louis R. Loeffler
- Music by: Lew Pollack; Sidney D. Mitchell; Louis Silvers
- Distributed by: 20th Century-Fox
- Release date: October 1, 1937
- Running time: 94 minutes
- Country: United States
- Language: English
- Box office: $1.5 million

Life Begins in College is a 1937 American comedy film directed by William A. Seiter. It marked the Ritz Brothers' first starring role in a feature film.

== Plot ==
The action takes place at Lombardy College, founded "to give the Indian nations of North America access to higher education". Little Black Cloud enrolls as "George Black". After being the subject of a hazing prank by football star Bob Hayner, George decides he is too humiliated to stay at school. He first stops to get his ripped pants repaired and meets the Ritz Brothers who convince him to stay.

Tim O'Hara, the football coach, is being pressured to resign because of his age. Janet, the coach's daughter, is Bob's love interest. Bob is on the committee trying to force out Coach O'Hara, but he likes the coach's daughter Janet. He tries to gain Janet's approval by helping her father, but fails at both. Janet, meanwhile, helps George escape from Inez, a love-struck student. Then George wishes to return the favor by helping the coach. George is actually rich, but does not want anyone to know in case they only like him for his money. The Ritz Brothers offer to pretend it is their money. After spending a good deal on themselves, the brothers donate $50,000 to the college with two conditions: O'Hara must remain as coach, and they must be allowed to play for the football team.

After a scuffle between them on the practice field, Bob is replaced by George as quarterback. A winning streak for Lombardy ensues, no thanks to the Ritz Brothers, who score for the other side whenever they play. Inez continues to pursue George, and Janet's feelings towards Bob soften. Bob, however, is being pursued by his former girlfriend, Cuddles.

It turns out that George's participation on a company football team makes him a professional and therefore ineligible for the college team. This information is used by Cuddles to blackmail Bob into dating her. When she sees Bob with Janet, she makes good on her threat of exposing George right before the "big game". Since George cannot play, Bob must take over as quarterback. Bob scores a touchdown but breaks his collarbone while the other team is still ahead. The Ritz Brothers sneak onto the field and nearly destroy Lombardy's chances with their antics. At the last second Harry Ritz scores an unlikely touchdown to win the game.

== Cast ==
- Al Ritz as Al
- Harry Ritz as Harry
- Jimmy Ritz as Jimmy
- Joan Davis as Inez
- Tony Martin as Band Leader
- Gloria Stuart as Janet O'Hara
- Fred Stone as Coach Tim O'Hara
- Nat Pendleton as George "Little Black Cloud" Black
- Dick Baldwin as Bob Hayner
- Joan Marsh as Cuddles
- Jed Prouty as Oliver Stearns Jr.
- Maurice Cass as Dean Moss
- Ed Thorgersen as Radio announcer
- Marjorie Weaver as Miss Murphy
- Robert Lowery as Sling
- Lon Chaney Jr. as Gilks
- J.C. Nugent as T. Edwin Cabot
- Fred Kohler Jr. as Bret
- Elisha Cook Jr. as Ollie Stearns
- Charles C. Wilson as Coach Burke
- Frank Sully as Acting captain
- Norman Willis as Referee

== Production ==
Life Begins in College was filmed between early July to early September 1937. The several working titles were variations on Pigskin Parade. The screenplay by Don Ettlinger and Karl Tunberg was based on a series of stories by Darrell Ware. The Ritz Brothers had been on contract at 20th Century Fox for over a year but this was the first picture to give them star billing, as well as the first to make them more than incidental to the plot.

Lew Pollack composed and Sidney Mitchell wrote the lyrics to "Big Chief Swing It", "Our Team Is on the Warpath", "Fair Lombardy", and "Why Talk About Love?". The song "Sweet Varsity Sue" was written by Charles Tobias, Al Lewis, and Murray Mencher. Special material for the Ritz Brothers was contributed by Sam Pokrass, Sid Kuller, and Ray Golden.

== Release ==
The film premiered in New York September 24, 1937, and was released nationally on October 1. Generally favorable reviews appeared in Variety, Motion Picture Daily, and The Film Daily.
