= Behind the Eight Ball (film) =

1942 film

- Theatrical release poster
- Directed by: Edward F. Cline
- Screenplay by: Stanley Roberts; Mel Ronson
- Story by: Stanley Roberts
- Produced by: Howard Benedict
- Starring: Al Ritz; Jimmy Ritz; Harry Ritz; Carol Bruce; Dick Foran; Grace McDonald; Johnny Downs; William Demarest
- Cinematography: George Robinson
- Edited by: Maurice Wright
- Production company: Universal Pictures
- Distributed by: Universal Pictures
- Release date: December 4, 1942
- Running time: 60 minutes
- Country: United States
- Language: English

Behind the Eight Ball is a 1942 American comedy film directed by Edward F. Cline and written by Stanley Roberts and Mel Ronson. The film stars Al Ritz, Jimmy Ritz, Harry Ritz, Carol Bruce, Dick Foran, Grace McDonald, Johnny Downs and William Demarest. The film was released on December 4, 1942, by Universal Pictures.

== Plot ==
A summer stock theatre is plagued by a series of backstage murders and sabotage. When the latest group to play there arrives and is informed of the situation, the least talented members of the troupe, The Ritz Brothers, are promoted to headliners under the reasoning that they are the most expendable. Detective Demarest is tasked with investigating the murders, but is frequently hindered by The Ritz Brothers.

The Ritz Brothers become heroes upon their discovery of a secret room backstage that is being used as an Axis radio room. Upon this victory, The Ritz Brothers finally make headlines as a result of their own efforts.

== Cast ==
- Al Ritz as Al Jester
- Jimmy Ritz as Jimmy Jester
- Harry Ritz as Harry Jester
- Carol Bruce as Joan Barry
- Dick Foran as Bill Edwards
- Grace McDonald as Babs
- Johnny Downs as Danny
- William Demarest as McKenzie
- Richard Davies as Clay Martin
- Russell Hicks as Harry B. Kemp
- Vinton Hayworth as Bobby Leonard
- Sonny Dunham as Orchestra Leader
