= Won Ton Ton, the Dog Who Saved Hollywood =

1976 American comedy film

- Theatrical release poster
- Directed by: Michael Winner
- Written by: Arnold Schulman; Cy Howard
- Produced by: David V. Picker; Arnold Schulman; Michael Winner
- Starring: Bruce Dern; Madeline Kahn; Art Carney; Phil Silvers; Teri Garr; Ron Leibman
- Cinematography: Richard H. Kline
- Edited by: Bernard Gribble
- Music by: Neal Hefti
- Distributed by: Paramount Pictures
- Release date: May 26, 1976
- Running time: 92 minutes
- Country: United States
- Language: English
- Budget: $3 million
- Box office: $1.2 million

Won Ton Ton, the Dog Who Saved Hollywood is a 1976 American comedy film directed by Michael Winner, and starring Bruce Dern, Madeline Kahn, Teri Garr and Art Carney. Spoofing the craze surrounding Rin Tin Tin, the film is notable for the large number of cameo appearances by actors and actresses from Hollywood's golden age, many of whom had been employees of Paramount Pictures, the film's distributor.

== Plot ==
After escaping the dog pound, German Shepherd Won Ton Ton links up with budding actress Estie Del Ruth and wannabe film screenwriter Grayson Potchuck and then becomes a Hollywood star.

== Cast ==
Starring

- Bruce Dern as Grayson Potchuck
- Madeline Kahn as Estie Del Ruth
- Art Carney as J.J. Fromberg
- Phil Silvers as Murray Fromberg
- Ron Leibman as Rudy Montague
- Teri Garr as Fluffy Peters
- Ronny Graham as Mark Bennett

Larger cameos These players may have a few scenes or are prominently featured in a short segment with lines.

- Dorothy Lamour as Visiting Film Star
- Joan Blondell as Landlady
- Rhonda Fleming as Rhoda Flaming
- Dennis Morgan as Tour Guide
- Ethel Merman as Hedda Parsons
- Virginia Mayo as Miss Battley
- Henny Youngman as Manny Farber
- Rory Calhoun as Phillip Hart
- Billy Barty as Assistant Director
- Andy Devine as Priest in Dog Pound
- Broderick Crawford as Special Effects Man
- Keye Luke as Cook in Kitchen
- Walter Pidgeon as Grayson's Butler
- Aldo Ray as Stubby Stebbins
- Nancy Walker as Mrs. Fromberg
- Dean Stockwell as Paul Lavell
- Dick Haymes as James Crawford
- Tab Hunter as David Hamilton
- Robert Alda as Richard Entwhistle
- Harry Ritz and Jimmy Ritz as Cleaning Women
- Victor Mature as Nick
- Edgar Bergen as Professor Quicksand
- Carmel Myers as Woman Journalist
- Henry Wilcoxon as Silent Film Director
- Alice Faye as Secretary at Gate
- Yvonne De Carlo as Cleaning Woman

Brief cameo appearances These players have brief appearances but may have lines of dialogue.

- Shecky Greene as Tourist
- William Demarest as Studio Gatekeeper
- Ricardo Montalbán as Silent Film Star
- Jackie Coogan as Stagehand #1
- Gloria DeHaven as President's Girl #1
- Louis Nye as Radio Interviewer
- Ken Murray as Souvenir Salesman
- Rudy Vallee as Autograph Hound
- George Jessel as Awards Announcer
- Eli Mintz as Tailor
- Fritz Feld as Rudy's Butler
- Edward Ashley as Second Butler
- Jane Connell as Waitress
- Dennis Day as Singing Telegraph Man
- Mike Mazurki as Studio Guard
- Jesse White as Rudy's Agent
- Jack Carter as Male Journalist
- Army Archerd as Premiere MC
- Huntz Hall as Moving Man
- Doodles Weaver as Man in Mexican Film
- Pedro Gonzalez Gonzalez as Mexican Projectionist
- Morey Amsterdam as Custard Pie Star #1
- Eddie Foy Jr. as Custard Pie Star #2
- Peter Lawford as Custard Pie Star #3
- Patricia Morison as Star at Screening
- Regis Toomey as Burlesque Stagehand
- Ann Rutherford as Grayson's Studio Secretary
- Milton Berle as Blind Man
- John Carradine as Drunk
- Phil Leeds as Dog Catcher #1
- Cliff Norton as Dog Catcher #2
- Sterling Holloway as Old Man on Bus

Brief cameo appearances These players are seen but have no lines of dialogue.

- William Benedict as Man on Bus
- Dorothy Gulliver as Old Woman on Bus
- Richard Arlen as Silent Film Star #2
- Jack La Rue as Silent Film Villain
- Johnny Weissmuller as Stagehand #2
- Stepin Fetchit as Dancing Butler
- Ann Miller as President's Girl #2
- Janet Blair as President's Girl #3
- Barbara Nichols as Nick's Girl
- Fernando Lamas as Premiere Male Star
- Zsa Zsa Gabor as Premiere Female Star
- Cyd Charisse as President's Girl #4
- Guy Madison as Star at Screening
- Eddie Le Veque as Prostitute's Customer
- Toni Basil as Award Ceremony Guest

== Production ==
The film was originally called A Bark is Born and was based on the career of Rin Tin Tin. The story was written by Cy Howard in 1971. He hired Arnold Schulman to write the script. It was developed by David V. Picker at Warner Bros. who requested the title be changed so as to not clash with their upcoming version of A Star is Born. Picker changed it to Won Ton Ton the Dog that Saved Warner Bros.

Warner Bros. decided not to make the film. Picker took the script with him when he moved to Paramount, causing the title to be changed. The owners of Rin Tin Tin sued the producers, causing Picker to insist his dog was completely fictional.

Lily Tomlin was offered the female lead but wanted her partner Jane Wagner to rewrite the script. Director Michael Winner said Tomlin "felt we mustn't go for the laugh. Well, in a comedy laughs don't hurt." Tomlin left the project. Picker says Bette Midler wanted to make the film "but we couldn't come to an arrangement." Eventually Madeline Kahn was cast. Bruce Dern said he accepted the lead "because I've never been in a hit. This is a very funny movie." Filming started in August 1975. Karl Miller was in charge of the dog Augustus Von Schumacher.

Arnold Schulman, credited as a writer and producer, later said:

Not only did David Picker, the producer, have every word of the script rewritten, but he hired Michael Winner, the director of all the Charles Bronson Death Wish pictures, to "realize" the film, as the post-Cahiers du Cinéma directors like to put it. It was written by me as a satire, written by God-knows-who as a slapstick farce, and directed with all the charm and wit of a chain-saw massacre. I had nothing to do with the final picture, and on that one, I was not only listed as co-writer but also as executive producer, and I couldn't get my name off! (Laughs.)

== Reception ==
The film opened to negative reviews when it premiered in the late spring of 1976. On the review aggregator website Rotten Tomatoes, 14% of 14 critics' reviews are positive, with an average rating of 5.2/10.

Richard Eder of The New York Times wrote, "What saves the movie, a jumble of good jokes and bad, sloppiness, chaos and apparently any old thing that came to hand, is Madeline Kahn...What she has – as W.C. Fields and Buster Keaton and Charlie Chaplin had – is a kind of unwavering purpose at right angles to reality, a concentration that she bears, Magoolike, through all kinds of unreasonable events." Arthur D. Murphy of Variety reported that "this project might have worked to a degree of whimsy. But the alchemy in the direction has turned potential cotton candy into reinforced concrete; Winner's Death Wish is funnier in comparison. Kevin Thomas of the Los Angeles Times wrote "Sixty guest stars can't save Won Ton Ton, the Dog Who Saved Hollywood...from its unrelentingly crass tone and steady stream of unfunny jokes. Unquestionably, the best performance is given by an appealing German shepherd named Augustus Von Schumacher, who plays Won Ton Ton."

Gene Siskel of the Chicago Tribune gave the film two stars out of four and called it "a scattershot comedy that can't make up its mind whether to be 'wholesome family entertainment' or a smutty film industry in-joke. It goes both ways." Jerry Oster of the New York Daily News wrote that "the script, by Arnold Schulman and Cy Howard, is singular among comedies in that it has not one funny line. The direction, by Michael Winner (Michael Winner, he of such cynical movies as The Mechanic and Death Wish, directing a comedy?) has a confused, questing quality to it. The acting—by Bruce Dern, as the dog's director, Madeline Kahn, as the dog's best friend. Art Carney, as a producer, and Ron Leibman, as a Valentino-esque actor—is extravagantly bad, as if grimaces and gesticulations would conceal the script's inadequacies. Won Ton Ton is played by a dog named Augustus Von Schumacher (pets should be protected from their owner's muses), who is quite appealing and who, when he covers his ears as some dynamite is about to explode, chalks up the movie's only laugh. If only it weren't for all those people."

Patrick Taggart of the Austin American-Statesman wrote:

Both a parody and a reverent comedy (it never does seem to find a single direction) about Hollywood in the 1920s, Paramount Pictures has assembled a huge cast of old movie greats for a sloppy and unfunny parade of old movie send-ups and their stars.

The film stars Art Carney, Bruce Dern and Madeline Kahn fine performers all, and one can take away some enjoyment in their zestful performances. And there are some good tricks involving the dog, which should turn on the kids and people who go soft over dogs.

But director Winner has given the film such a ragged, patchwork quality that the plot becomes a hopleless muddle (as if it needed any help in that direction), and there are only three really good jokes in the entire thing. And three good gags do not a comedy make.

John Pym of The Monthly Film Bulletin wrote "Michael Winner does not have Mel Brooks' frenzied gift for marshaling this sort of material; and, to make matters worse, the script attains a level of parody no higher than Ron Leibman's mincing caricature of Valentino, embellished with little more than the standard mannerisms of the familiar theatrical queen." Gary Arnold of The Washington Post stated "This tacky exercise in mock nostalgia may be added to that recent, weirdly miscalculated genre that includes W. C. Fields and Me, Gable and Lombard and The Day of the Locust...They may be presented as uninhibited, madcap spoofs of Old Hollywood, but they tend to end up illustrating the New Hollywood at its most crass, insecure and condescending."

Susan Stark of the Detroit Free Press wrote that the comedy "has about as much to do with a dog named Won Ton Ton saving Hollywood as it has to do with God having made little green apples or the price of eggs in China. We have become accustomed to imprecise or misleading movie titles but this one is downright inaccurate. Probably there was once a movie about a dog named Won Ton Ton who saved Hollywood that looked like a loser and was sent back to the cutting room. We'll never know for sure, but that picture almost had to be better than the one presently on view. As it stands, this picture not only omits the story of the dog who saved Hollywood, it omits any story altogether. A dog named Won Ton Ton, however, is indeed present."

Of the acting, Stark wrote that "not even an actor of Dern's estimable caliber can do a thing with that kind of tiresome material", that Kahn, "In addition to being given a wealth of flat comic material", "is coiffed and clothed in exceptionally unflattering style" and that "the dog, a German shepherd, comes off best, largely because he does not have to share the burden of speaking the lines as written but also because no one interfered much with his naturally dignified appearance. The rhinestone collar he has to wear for the part is all but obscured by his healthy coat and they never did get him to use the gold-plated fire hydrant parked next to his between-takes spot on the movie-within-a-movie set." She ended the review by saying, "you've heard of Lassie, Come Home? They should call this one, Won Ton Ton, Go Home.." Jeanne Miller of the San Francisco Examiner also enjoyed the dog's performance, but remarked, as well, that the film "starts with a marvelously whimsical premise that director Michael Winner is unable to develop in rich comic terms."

Joe Pollack of the St. Louis Post-Dispatch wrote "On one level, Won Ton Ton, the Dog Who Saved Hollywood, is an atrocious movie. Supposedly a comic spoof, it lacks humor. It also lacks grace, class, style and intelligence, a group of attributes more common in their absence than their presence in many Hollywood productions, but not generally absent to such a great degree. On another level, however, the movie is so bad that it is almost good. It is an exercise in how to take a pretty good idea and to overdo it until quintessential boredom is reached, but it also provides an opportunity to see a fading galaxy of former-stars, most of whom cause a first reaction of, 'Gee, I didn't know he was still alive.'"

The film was one of five reviewed in the July 16, 1976, edition of The Times of London, where David Robinson had some particularly biting criticisms of it:

And so, reluctantly, to Won Ton Ton, The Dog Who Saved Hollywood, which would have been better titled The Dog Who Savaged Hollywood. There's a case for a Society for the Prevention of Cruelty to Old Actors. The gimmick of Michael Winner's film is to parade a pageant of great old Hollywood names. Presumably they were persuaded to do it in the belief that the film was to be an affectionate homage to the old Hollywood. Their walk-ons suggest that they were required at the studio so briefly that there was not even time to make them up or light them, let alone explain what they were supposed to be doing; certainly aging people could hardly be filmed with less sympathy.

Indeed, you could believe that it had been done to humiliate and demean them. Yvonne De Carlo and Alice Faye are cast, or cast in, as aged secretaries, Virginia Mayo is a cleaning woman, Walter Pidgeon (and in a film like this you think of him as Walter Pidgeon and not as a character) is given one moment, hurling a stone at a dog. Carmel Myers, once the leading lady of Fairbanks, Valentino and Ramon Novarro and a star of Ben-Hur, is a walk-on.

Well, maybe they have only themselves to blame, and they have got good money for it. But the meanness is as unduckable in the treatment of the humans as in a particularly brutal (however tricked) gag of the dog, having been trained to jump through prop paper walls, hurling himself bewilderedly against real ones.

It is just a mean film (which is small recommendation for a comedy, you might think). It has a mean view of what Hollywood and its artists were and represented; it has a mean view of the achievement of the silent cinema. The audience does not have such a great time either; the film tries to conceal its deficiencies in comic ideas and comic skill by doing everything at the pace of a clockwork toy with a too-tight spring.

Vaguely pretending to be based on the real-life dog star Rin-Tin-Tin, it is particularly mean about him. He was certainly a lot more fun than this (admittedly not unlovable) counterfeit.

Just to prove how the film defames the silent cinema, there [were] currently opportunities [in London] to see the real thing. The Strong Man, even though not the best of the three films in which Frank Capra directed Harry Langdon, the elderly baby of slapstick comedy, is about a hundred times funnier than Michael Winner could ever be.

A mildly positive review of the film came from Perry Stewart of the Fort Worth Star-Telegram, who wrote, It will come as no great surprise to any of you that Won Ton Ton the Dog Who Saved Hollywood falls short of, say, Citizen Kane and Barry Lyndon. What will be a mild and agreeable shock to some is that this new comedy at the Cineworld and Pioneer 4 is not the dog (sorry) that some national reviewers have said it is."

Stewart continued, "Won Ton Ton is in fact a pleasant dose of PG humor which, while not altogether without sophistication, must have missed a G rating by the narrowest of squeaks. And oddly it is those few lapses of language which seem the most awkward and unnecessary.
