= M. M. Musselman =

American screenwriter

Morris McNeil Musselman (February 19, 1899 – April 22, 1952) was a Hollywood screenwriter and writer.

== Bibliography ==
- The honeymoon is over, a comedy in one act (1941)
- Wheels in His Head; father and his inventions (1945) Biography of his father, the inventor, A. J. Musselman.
- It Took Nine Tailors (1948) Autobiography of Adolphe Menjou. Foreword by Clark Gable.
- Get A Horse! - The Story Of The Automobile In America (1950)
- I Married A Redhead (1951)
- Second Honeymoon (1952)

== Filmography ==
- The Bride Came C.O.D. (1941)
- The Three Musketeers (1939)

== Quotes ==
"One of the best things about marriage is that it gets young people to bed at a decent hour."
