= Tony Martin (American singer) =

American actor and singer (1913–2012)

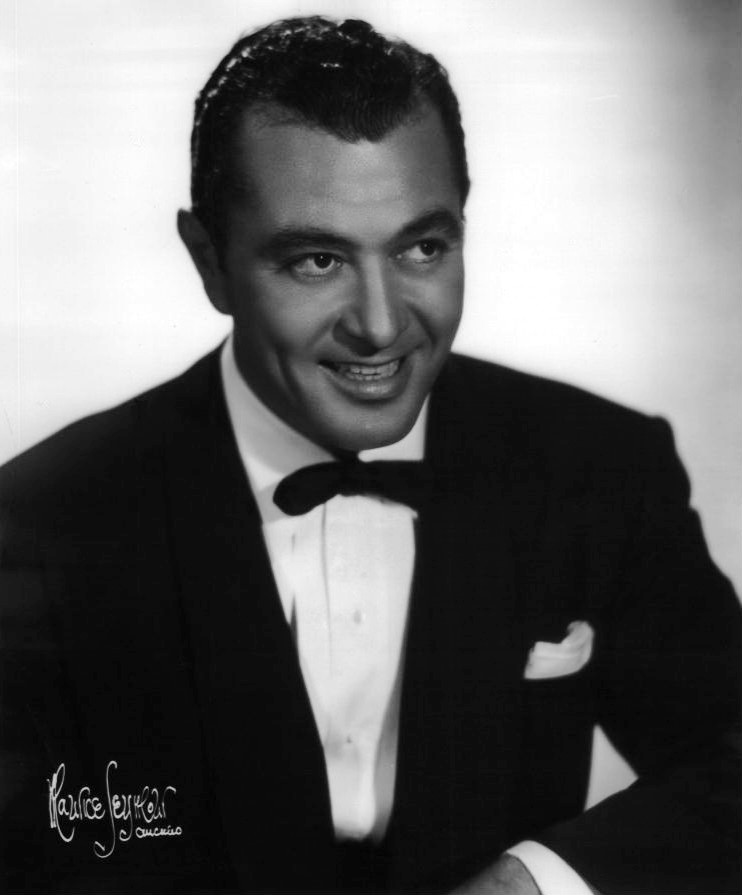
- Martin in 1953

Background information
- Born: Alvin Morris; December 25, 1913; San Francisco, California, U.S.
- Died: July 27, 2012 (aged 98) Los Angeles, California, U.S.
- Genres: Big band; traditional pop
- Occupations: Singer; actor
- Years active: 1933–2009
- Labels: Decca; Mercury; RCA Victor; Motown
- Spouses: Alice Faye (m. 1937; div. 1940); Cyd Charisse (m. 1948; died 2008)

Alvin Morris (December 25, 1913 – July 27, 2012), known professionally as Tony Martin, was an American actor and singer of popular music.

His career spanned over seven decades, and he scored dozens of hits between the late-1930s and mid-1950s with songs such as "Walk Hand in Hand", "I Love Paris", "Stranger in Paradise", and "I Get Ideas". He was married to actress and dancer Cyd Charisse from 1948 until she died in 2008.

== Life and career ==
Alvin Morris was born on December 25, 1913, in San Francisco, the son of Hattie (née Smith) and Edward Clarence Morris. His family was Jewish, and all of his grandparents had emigrated from Eastern Europe. He was raised in Oakland, California. At the age of ten he received a saxophone as a gift from his grandmother. He went to Oakland Technical High School and Saint Mary's College of California.

In his grammar school glee club he became an instrumentalist and singer, playing both saxophone and clarinet. He formed his first band, named "The Red Peppers," when he was at Oakland Technical High School, eventually joining the band of a local orchestra leader, Tom Gerun, as a saxophone player sitting alongside the future bandleader Woody Herman. He attended Saint Mary's College of California during the mid-1930s. After college, he left Gerun's band to go to Hollywood to try films. It was at that time that he adopted the stage name of Tony Martin.

On the radio Martin sang and was the master of ceremonies on Tune-Up Time, with Andre Kostelanetz, on CBS in the early 1940s. He had a television program on NBC in the mid-1950s.

He was a featured vocalist on the George Burns and Gracie Allen radio program. On the show Allen playfully flirted with Tony, often threatening to fire him. Allen would say things like, "Oh, Tony, you look so tired, why don't you rest your lips on mine?"

In films Martin was first cast in several bit parts, including a role as a sailor in Follow the Fleet (1936), starring Fred Astaire and Ginger Rogers. He eventually signed with 20th Century-Fox and then Metro-Goldwyn-Mayer where he starred in several musicals. Between 1938 and 1942 he made several hit records for Decca. In 1941 Martin received equal billing with the Marx Brothers in their final MGM film, The Big Store, in an effort to lure pop music fans and as an indication of MGM's diminished interest in the comedy team. In the film he played a rising singer and performed "Tenement Symphony," which was written by Hal Borne, who became his longtime musical director. Martin was the last surviving actor to co-star with the Marx Brothers.

Martin joined the United States Navy in 1942 as a chief specialist, the equivalent of a chief petty officer. He was dismissed from the service that year for "unfitness" after he testified at the court-martial of a Naval procurement officer. He enlisted as a specialist after the officer twice failed to obtain a commission for him. Martin said that he had given the officer an auto worth $950 to "facilitate" his enlistment. At the time of his dismissal, the Navy said that removal for unfitness was not equivalent to a dishonorable discharge and "does not carry degradation."

After leaving the Navy, Martin asked his local draft board for immediate induction into the service. He was drafted into the Army and assigned to the United States Army Air Forces. He was assigned to Capt. Glenn Miller's band, at the request of Miller, who considered him the best singer in the armed services. Martin later said he felt as though he had "stumbled into heaven through the side door." Martin was later promoted to technical sergeant in the Air Transport Command and stationed in India, where Brig. Gen. William H. Tunner, commanding the Hump Airlift, put him to work as an entertainer, forming a troupe of amateur talent from the command and taking it around the various bases to perform.

After the war Martin signed with Mercury Records, then a small independent label run out of Chicago, Illinois. He cut 25 records in 1946 and 1947 for Mercury, including a 1946 recording of "To Each His Own," which became a million-seller and was awarded a gold disc by the RIAA. This prompted RCA Victor to offer him a record contract, which he signed in 1947 after satisfying his contract obligations to Mercury.

He continued to appear in film musicals during the 1940s and 1950s. He starred as Gaylord Ravenal in the Show Boat segment from the 1946 film Till the Clouds Roll By. His rendition of "Lover Come Back to Me" with Joan Weldon in Deep in My Heart – based on the life of Sigmund Romberg and starring José Ferrer - was one of the highlights of that 1954 film.

From April 26, 1954 to February 27, 1956 he starred on NBC's 15-minute musical television series, The Tony Martin Show (briefly interrupted during the summer of 1955 to make way for The Matt Dennis Show).

In 1958 he became the highest-paid performer in Las Vegas, signing a five-year deal at the Desert Inn and earning $25,000 a week.

In an unlikely pairing, Martin recorded for the Motown Records label in the mid-1960s, scoring a minor hit with the record "Talkin' To Your Picture".

In the 1970s Martin was a television spokesperson for the Lady Brevoni brand of pantyhose sold in supermarkets.

Martin was a stockholder in the Parvin-Dohrmann Corporation, a hotel and casino company that owned the Flamingo Las Vegas.

Martin's professional singing career extended well into his nineties.

== Personal life ==
Martin and Alice Faye divorced in 1940.

In 1948 Martin married actress and dancer Cyd Charisse. They remained married for 60 years until her death on June 17, 2008. They had one son together, Tony Martin, Jr., who predeceased his father in 2011 as a result of several head injuries sustained in an auto accident in 2003.

Martin and Charisse were both Republicans who campaigned for Richard Nixon.

Martin died on the evening of July 27, 2012, of natural causes at age 98. He was buried at the Hillside Memorial Park Cemetery in Culver City, California. He was remembered by the Hollywood Reporter as "one of the last big stars from Hollywood's golden age of musicals."

== Discography ==
Year	Single	Chart positions			
Year	Single	US	CB	US AC	UK
1936	"When Did You Leave Heaven?" (with Victor Young)				
1938	"The Moon of Manakoora" (with Ray Noble)	15			
1938	"I Hadn't Anyone Till You" (with Ray Noble)	4			
1938	"You Couldn't Be Cuter" (with Ray Noble)	16			
1938	"My Walking Stick" (with Ray Noble)	17			
1938	"Now It Can Be Told" (with Ray Noble)	13			
1939	"South of the Border"	16			
1940	"It's a Blue World"	2			
1940	"Fools Rush In"	14			
1941	"Tonight We Love"	5			
1946	"To Each His Own"	4			
1946	"Rumors Are Flying"	9			
1946	"I'll Dance at Your Wedding"	23			
1948	"Hooray for Love"	21			
1948	"Confess"	25			
1948	"For Every Man There's a Woman"	30			
1948	"It's Magic"	11			
1949	"If You Stub Your Toe on the Moon"	17			
1949	"Circus"	24			
1949	"There's No Tomorrow"	2			
1949	"Marta"	15			
1950	"I Said My Pajamas (and Put on My Pray'rs)" (with Fran Warren)	3			
1950	"Valencia"	18			
1950	"La Vie en rose"	9			
1951	"A Penny a Kiss" (with Dinah Shore)	8			
1951	"In Your Arms" (with Dinah Shore)	20			
1951	"Would I Love You"	19			
1951	"I Get Ideas"	3			
1951	"I Apologize"	20			
1951	"The Musicians" (with Dinah Shore, Betty Hutton & Phil Harris)	24			
1951	"Vanity"	18			
1951	"Over a Bottle of Wine"	17			
1951	"Domino"	9			
1952	"Kiss of Fire"	6			
1952	"Some Day"	24			
1952	"Luna Rossa"	27			
1952	"Dance of Destiny"	27	24		
1952	"Sleepy Time Gal"		28		
1952	"Don't Tempt Me"		35		
1953	"April in Portugal"	17			
1953	"Sorta on the Border"	26			
1953	"Caribbean"		19		
1953	"Relax"		27		
1954	"Stranger in Paradise"	10	1		6
1954	"That's What a Rainy Day Is For"		37		
1954	"Here (In This Enchanted Place)"	5	5		
1954	"Angels In the Sky"		19		
1954	"Boulevard of Nightingales"		37		
1954	"Uno"		37		
1954	"My Bambino"		36		
1955	"All of You"		25		
1955	"Do, Do, Do"		35		
1955	"Just a Man"		48		
1956	"Walk Hand in Hand"	10	16		2
1956	"It's Better in the Dark"	60			
1957	"Do I Love You (Because You're Beautiful)"	82			
1965	"Talkin' to Your Picture"	133			
1967	"Theme from The Sand Pebbles (And We Were Lovers)"			22	

== Filmography ==
- Foolish Hearts (1936)
- Follow the Fleet (1936)
- The Farmer in the Dell (1936)
- Murder on a Bridle Path (1936)
- The Witness Chair (1936) (scenes deleted)
- Poor Little Rich Girl (1936)
- Back to Nature (1936)
- Sing, Baby, Sing (1936)
- Pigskin Parade (1936)
- Banjo on My Knee (1936)
- The Holy Terror (1937)
- Sing and Be Happy (1937)
- You Can't Have Everything (1937)
- Life Begins in College (1937)
- Ali Baba Goes to Town (1937)
- Sally, Irene and Mary (1938)
- Kentucky Moonshine (1938)
- Up the River (1938)
- Thanks for Everything (1938)
- Winner Take All (1939)
- Music in My Heart (1940)
- Ziegfeld Girl (1941)
- The Big Store (1941)
- Till the Clouds Roll By (1946)
- Casbah (1948)
- Hollywood Goes to Bat (1950) (short subject)
- Two Tickets to Broadway (1951)
- Clash by Night (1952) (Cameo)
- Here Come the Girls (1953)
- Easy to Love (1953)
- Deep in My Heart (1954)
- Hit the Deck (1955)
- Meet Me in Las Vegas (1956) (Cameo)
- Quincannon, Frontier Scout (1956)
- Let's Be Happy (1957)
- Donna Reed Show "Tony Martin Visits". Cameo appearance. (Mar 2, 1961)
- What’s My Line? Tony Martin mystery guest/panelist (Oct 28, 1962) (May 21, 1961)
- Dear Mr. Wonderful (1982)
