= Straight, Place and Show =

1938 film by David Butler

- Directed by: David Butler
- Screenplay by: M. M. Musselman; Allen Rivkin; Jack Lait Jr.; Lew Brown
- Based on: Saratoga Chips by Damon Runyon and Irving Caesar
- Produced by: David Hempstead; Darryl F. Zanuck
- Starring: The Ritz Brothers; Richard Arlen; Ethel Merman
- Cinematography: Ernest Palmer
- Edited by: Irene Morra
- Production company: 20th Century-Fox
- Distributed by: 20th Century-Fox
- Release date: September 30, 1938
- Running time: 68 minutes
- Country: United States
- Language: English

Straight, Place and Show is a 1938 American comedy film directed by David Butler and starring the Ritz Brothers, Richard Arlen, and Ethel Merman, and released by 20th Century-Fox. It based on the unproduced play Saratoga Chips by Damon Runyon and Irving Caesar. It features a performance of the song "With You on My Mind" by Merman.

== Plot ==
Al, Jimmy and Harry get into a jam at the racetrack and expose a gang of cheating Russian jockeys.

== Cast ==
- The Ritz Brothers as Themselves
- Ethel Merman as Linda Tyler
- Richard Arlen as Denny Paine
- Phyllis Brooks as Barbara Drake
- George Barbier as Mr. Drake
- Lon Chaney Jr. small role as a chauffeur

== See also ==
- List of films about horse racing
