= Sing, Baby, Sing =

1936 film by Sidney Lanfield

- Poster of the film
- Directed by: Sidney Lanfield
- Written by: Milton Sperling; Harry Tugend; Jack Yellen
- Produced by: Darryl F. Zanuck
- Starring: Alice Faye; Adolphe Menjou; Gregory Ratoff; Ted Healy; Patsy Kelly; Michael Whalen; The Ritz Brothers; Montagu Love; Dixie Dunbar; Douglas Fowley; Paul Stanton; Tony Martin
- Cinematography: J. Peverell Marley
- Edited by: Barbara McLean
- Music by: Richard A. Whiting; Walter Bullock; Cyril J. Mockridge
- Production company: Twentieth Century Fox
- Distributed by: Twentieth Century Fox
- Release date: August 21, 1936
- Running time: 90 minutes
- Country: United States
- Language: English
- Box office: $1 million

Sing, Baby, Sing is a 1936 American musical comedy film directed by Sidney Lanfield and starring Alice Faye, Adolphe Menjou and Gregory Ratoff. It was produced and distributed by Twentieth Century Fox. Richard A. Whiting and Walter Bullock received an Academy Award nomination in Best Original Song at the 9th Academy Awards for their song "When Did You Leave Heaven".

== Plot ==
After Joan Warren (Alice Faye) is fired from her singing job at the Ritz Club, where she performs with the Ritz Brothers, she seeks help from theatrical agent, Nicky Alexander (Gregory Ratoff). Nicky, however, is in the process of being evicted from his office suite, so he tells her to find another agent. When she insists that he represent her, he takes her to Mr. Brewster (Paul Stanton), president of the Federal Broadcasting Company, and Joan auditions, but Brewster refuses to hire her because she is not of the upper class.

Back at the club, Joan packs her bags, while in the street, a crowd gathers around drunken actor Bruce Farraday (Adolphe Menjou). Nicky leads Farraday into the club, where Farraday orders a huge feast and hears Joan perform her last song. After more wine, Farraday passes out, and they take him to a hospital, where he babbles lines of Shakespeare. To create some publicity, Nicky tells Joan to play "Juliet" to Farraday's "Romeo." While Al Craven (Ted Healy), the brother of Nicky's secretary Fitz (Patsy Kelly), searches for alcohol to keep Farraday from sobering up, Nicky calls the newspapers, saying that Farraday is on his deathbed. When the doctor arrives and forbids visitors, Al pretends to be Farraday's personal physician and relieves him of the case. Nicky sneaks Joan in to see Farraday, while cynical reporter Ted Blake (Michael Whalen) and Joe (Cully Richards), a photographer, climb onto the fire escape and photograph them.

Later, Al accompanies Farraday home, and the puzzled Farraday wonders why he can't remember hiring a personal physician. The newspapers print the story, and Brewster decides that he wants to hire Joan on the condition that Farraday will perform as well. At their new home at the Madison Towers, the group learns that Farraday is about to return to Hollywood at the behest of his cousin and business manager, Robert Wilson, who is furious over the publicity. Nicky goes to Farraday and suggests that he show his cousin that he has a head for business by getting the lucrative radio contract. Robert arrives, tells the newspapers that Joan is a gold digger and escorts Farraday onto the train leaving for California. As a result of the new story, Brewster no longer wants to sign Joan. Ted explains that to be the first to print a retraction of Robert's statement, his newspaper will fly Joan out to Farraday. They fly to Kansas City to meet Farraday's train and trick Robert into leaving without Farraday. Then, they arrange with Brewster to broadcast that evening from Kansas City. They round up some performers for the show, including the Ritz Brothers, who happen to be in town. As Farraday prepares to go on the air, Robert returns and locks himself in the hotel room with Farraday, but Farraday escapes. He arrives at the station in the nick of time and exonerates Joan, securing for her the radio contract with Brewster.

== Cast ==
- Alice Faye as Joan Warren
- Adolphe Menjou as Bruce Farraday
- Gregory Ratoff as Nicholas K. Alexander
- Ted Healy as Al Craven
- Patsy Kelly as Fitz Craven
- Michael Whalen as Ted Blake
- The Ritz Brothers as Themselves
- Montagu Love as Robert Wilson
- Dixie Dunbar as Telephone Operator
- Douglas Fowley as Mac
- Paul Stanton as Brewster
- Tony Martin as Tony Renaldo
- Cully Richards as Joe
- Stanley Blystone as Kelly
- Ernie Stanton as Mac's Friend (uncredited)
- Sam McDaniel as Train Porter (uncredited)
- Jerry Tucker as Wilson's Son (uncredited)

== Soundtrack ==
- Sing, Baby, Sing

by Lew Pollack and Jack Yellen

- The Music Goes Round And Round

(1935) (uncredited) Music by Edward Farley and Mike Riley, Lyrics by Red Hodgson

- When Did You Leave Heaven?

Music by Richard A. Whiting, Lyrics by Walter Bullock

- You Turned The Tables On Me

by Louis Alter and Sidney D. Mitchell

- Love Will Tell

by Lew Pollack and Jack Yellen
