= Hi'ya, Chum =

1943 film by Harold Young

- Directed by: Harold Young
- Screenplay by: Edmund L. Hartmann
- Starring: The Ritz Brothers; Jane Frazee; Robert Paige; June Clyde
- Cinematography: Charles Van Enger
- Edited by: Maurice Wright
- Music by: Hans J. Salter; Frank Skinner (uncredited)
- Distributed by: Universal Pictures
- Release date: 1943
- Running time: 61 minutes
- Country: United States
- Language: English

Hi'ya, Chum is a 1943 American musical comedy film starring Jane Frazee and the Ritz Brothers.

== Cast ==
- Ritz Brothers - Merry Madcaps
- Jane Frazee - Sunny Lee
- Robert Paige - Tommy Craig
- June Clyde - Madge Tracy
- Paul Hurst - Archie Billings
- Edmund MacDonald - Terry Barton
- Lou Lubin - Eddie Gibbs
- Andrew Tombes - Jerry MackIntosh
- Ray Walker - Jackson
- Richard Davies - Worker
