= Kentucky Moonshine =

1938 film by David Butler

- Directed by: David Butler
- Screenplay by: M. M. Musselman; Jack Lait Jr.
- Produced by: Darryl F. Zanuck
- Starring: The Ritz Brothers; Tony Martin; Marjorie Weaver
- Cinematography: Robert H. Planck
- Edited by: Irene Morra
- Color process: Black and white
- Production company: 20th Century Fox
- Distributed by: 20th Century Fox
- Release date: May 20, 1938
- Running time: 85 minutes
- Country: United States
- Language: English

Kentucky Moonshine is a 1938 American comedy musical film directed by David Butler and released by 20th Century Fox.

== Plot ==
Radio star Jerry Wade's program ratings are falling and he suggests to his sponsors a show that is different and he goes to Kentucky to find an idea. Caroline, a Kentucky girl in New York trying to crash into radio, learns of Wade's quest and takes her three friends, Harry, Jimmy and Al Ritz, also aspiring to show-business fame, to Kentucky with her, where Wade discovers them in beards, guns, feuds, moonshine and every cliché that fits the hillbillies lifestyle. He stages a broadcast from the hills, which is not heard because of technical difficulties. He takes the whole troupe back to New York with him.

== Cast ==
- Ritz Brothers as Themselves
- Tony Martin as Jerry Wade
- Marjorie Weaver as Caroline
- Slim Summerville as Hank Hatfield
- John Carradine as Reef Hatfield
- Wally Vernon as Gus Bryce
- Berton Churchill as J.B.
- Eddie Collins as 'Spats' Swenson
- Cecil Cunningham as Landlady
- Paul Stanton as Mortimer Hilton
- Mary Treen as 'Sugar' Hatfield
- Francis Ford as Grandpa Hatfield
- The Brian Sisters as Specialty
- Clarence Hummel Wilson as Attorney
- Frank McGlynn Jr. as Clem Hatfield
- Jan Duggan as Nurse
- Si Jenks as Buckboard Driver
- Irving Bacon as Hotel
- Olin Howland as Tom Slack
- John Hiestand as Radio Announcer
- Carroll Nye as Radio Announcer
- Tom Hanlon as Radio Announcer
