= The Three Musketeers (1939 film) =

1939 film by Allan Dwan

- Directed by: Allan Dwan
- Screenplay by: William A. Drake; M. M. Musselman; Sam Hellman; Ray Golden (special material); Sid Kuller (special material)
- Based on: The Three Musketeers; 1844 novel by Alexandre Dumas
- Produced by: Raymond Griffith (associate producer)
- Starring: Don Ameche; The Ritz Brothers
- Cinematography: Peverell Marley
- Edited by: Jack Dennis
- Music by: David Buttolph; Samuel Pokrass
- Distributed by: 20th Century Fox
- Release date: February 17, 1939
- Running time: 73 minutes
- Country: United States
- Language: English

The Three Musketeers is a 1939 musical comedy film adaptation of Alexandre Dumas's 1844 novel The Three Musketeers directed by Allan Dwan and starring Don Ameche as d'Artagnan, with the Ritz Brothers as his cowardly helpers. While the film can be found online, it did have an original copyright notice and renewal.

== Cast ==
- Don Ameche as d'Artagnan
- Ritz Brothers as Three Lackeys
- Binnie Barnes as Milady de Winter
- Gloria Stuart as Queen Anne
- Pauline Moore as Lady Constance
- Joseph Schildkraut as King Louis XIII
- John Carradine as Naveau
- Lionel Atwill as De Rochefort
- Miles Mander as Cardinal Richelieu
- Douglass Dumbrille as Athos (as Douglas Dumbrille)
- John 'Dusty' King as Aramis (as John King)
- Russell Hicks as Porthos
- Gregory Gaye as Vitray
- Lester Matthews as Duke of Buckingham
- Egon Brecher as Landlord
- Moroni Olsen as Bailiff
- Georges Renavent as Captain Fageon
- C. Montague Shaw as Ship Captain (as Montague Shaw)

== Songs ==
Music: Samuel Pokrass, lyrics: Walter Bullock.

- d'Artagnan song (Vara-vara-vara), Don Ameche.
- Chicken Soup, Ritz Brothers.
- Voila, Ritz Brothers.
- My Lady, Don Ameche.

== Reception ==
Frank Nugent, critic for New York Times, wrote: "That isn't a buzzing in your ears you've been hearing; it's Dumas, fils, spinning in his grave as the Ritz Brothers play his Three Musketeers ... It seems ironic that Mr. Zanuck's first attempt to deal reverently with a classic—in every respect but the Ritzes' share in it—should be impeded by its very reverence to the classic. The trouble, it appears, is that his burlesques are too serious and that his serious efforts are too often burlesques."

In the Leave it to Beaver episode "The Book Report" (1963), young Beaver Cleaver gets in trouble at school when he is assigned to write a book report about the Dumas novel, but instead of actually doing his homework and reading it, just watches the movie on television and bases his report on the film's comedic scenes and Ritz Brothers' zany antics.
