= Academy Award for Best Picture =

Annual award by the Academy of Motion Picture Arts and Sciences

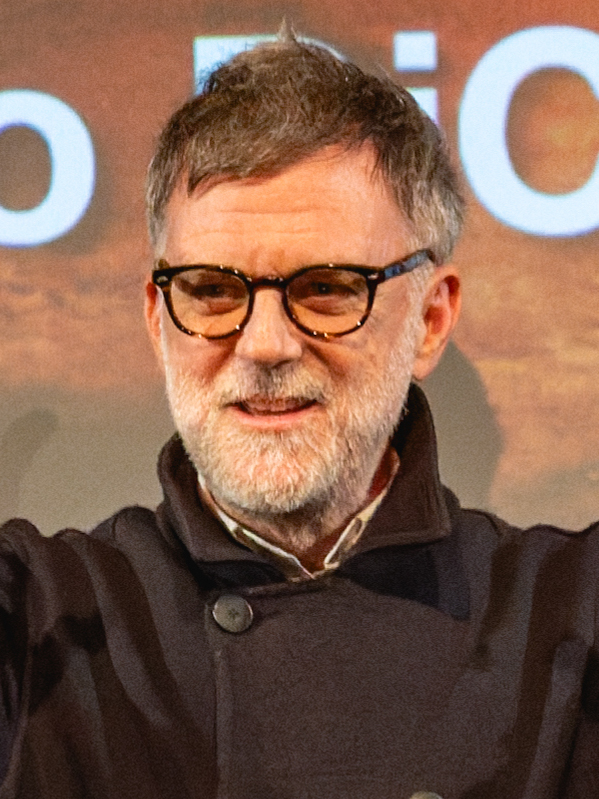
- The 98th recipients: Paul Thomas Anderson (pictured), Adam Somner (posth.), and Sara Murphy
- Awarded for: Best Motion Picture of the Year
- Country: United States
- Presented by: Academy of Motion Picture Arts and Sciences (AMPAS)
- First award: May 16, 1929; 97 years ago (for films released during the 1927/1928 film season)
- Most recent winner: One Battle After Another (2025)
- Website: www.oscars.org

The Academy Award for Best Picture is one of the Academy Awards (also known as Oscars) presented annually by the Academy of Motion Picture Arts and Sciences (AMPAS) since the awards debuted on May 16, 1929. This award goes to the producers of the film and is the only category in which every member of the Academy is eligible to submit a nomination and vote on the final ballot. The Best Picture category is traditionally the final award of the night and is widely considered the most prestigious honor of the ceremony.

The Grand Staircase columns at the Dolby Theatre in Hollywood, where the Academy Awards ceremonies have been held since 2002, showcase every film that has won the Best Picture title since the award's inception. There have been 621 films nominated for Best Picture and 98 winners.

== History ==
=== Category name changes ===
At the 1st Academy Awards ceremony held in 1929 (for films made in 1927 and 1928), there were two categories of awards that were each considered the top award of the night: "Outstanding Picture" and "Unique and Artistic Picture", the former being won by the war epic Wings, and the latter by the art film Sunrise. Each award was intended to honor different and equally important aspects of superior filmmaking. In particular, The Jazz Singer was disqualified from both awards, since its use of synchronized sound made the film a sui generis item that would have unfairly competed against either category, and the Academy granted the film an honorary award instead.

The following year, the Academy dropped the Unique and Artistic Picture award, deciding retroactively that the award won by Wings was the highest honor that could be awarded, and allowed synchronized sound films to compete for the award. Although the award kept the title Outstanding Picture for the next ceremony, the name underwent several changes over the years, as seen below. Since 1962, the award has been simply called Best Picture.

- 1927/28–1928/29: Academy Award for Outstanding Picture
- 1929/30–1940: Academy Award for Outstanding Production
- 1941–1943: Academy Award for Outstanding Motion Picture
- 1944–1961: Academy Award for Best Motion Picture
- 1962–present: Academy Award for Best Picture

=== Recipients ===
Until 1950, this award was presented to a representative of the production company. That year the protocol was changed so that the award was presented to all credited producers. This rule was modified in 1999 to apply a maximum limit of three producers receiving the award, after the five producers of Shakespeare in Love had received the award.

As of 2020, the "Special Rules for the Best Picture of the Year Award" limit recipients to those who meet two main requirements:

- Those with screen credit of "producer" or "produced by", explicitly excluding those with the screen credit "executive producer, co-producer, associate producer, line producer, or produced in association with"
- those three or fewer producers who have performed the major portion of the producing functions

The rules allow a bona fide team of not more than two people to be considered a single "producer" if the two individuals have had an established producing partnership as determined by the Producers Guild of America Producing Partnership Panel. Final determination of the qualifying producer nominees for each nominated picture will be made by the Producers Branch Executive Committee, including the right to name any additional qualified producer as a nominee.

The Academy can make exceptions to the limit, as when Anthony Minghella and Sydney Pollack were posthumously included among the four producers nominated for The Reader (2008). As of 2014 the Producers Branch Executive Committee determines such exceptions, noting they take place only in "rare and extraordinary circumstance[s]."

Steven Spielberg holds the record for most nominations at fourteen, winning one, while Kathleen Kennedy holds the record for most nominations without a win at eight. Sam Spiegel and Saul Zaentz tie for the most wins with three each. During the time when the Oscar was given to production companies instead, Metro-Goldwyn-Mayer received the most, with five wins and 40 nominations.

=== Best Picture and Best Director ===
The Academy Awards for Best Picture and Best Director have been closely linked throughout their history. Of the 98 films that have won Best Picture, 71 have also been awarded Best Director.

* Winners that were not nominated for the other category

List of Discrepancies between Best Picture and Best Director
Year	Best Picture Winner	Best Picture Director	Best Director Film	Best Director Winner
1927-28	Wings	William A. Wellman	7th Heaven (Dramatic Picture)	Frank Borzage
1927-28	Wings	William A. Wellman	Two Arabian Knights (Comedy Picture)	Lewis Milestone
1928-29	The Broadway Melody	Harry Beaumont	The Divine Lady	Frank Lloyd
1930-31	Cimarron	Wesley Ruggles	Skippy	Norman Taurog
1931-32	Grand Hotel	Edmund Goulding	Bad Girl	Frank Borzage
1935	Mutiny on the Bounty	Frank Lloyd	The Informer	John Ford
1936	The Great Ziegfeld	Robert Z. Leonard	Mr. Deeds Goes to Town	Frank Capra
1937	The Life of Emile Zola	William Dieterle	The Awful Truth	Leo McCarey
1940	Rebecca	Alfred Hitchcock	The Grapes of Wrath	John Ford
1948	Hamlet	Laurence Olivier	The Treasure of the Sierra Madre	John Huston
1949	All the King's Men	Robert Rossen	A Letter to Three Wives	Joseph Mankiewicz
1951	An American in Paris	Vincente Minnelli	A Place in the Sun	George Stevens
1952	The Greatest Show on Earth	Cecil B. DeMille	The Quiet Man	John Ford
1956	Around the World in 80 Days	Michael Anderson	Giant	George Stevens
1967	In the Heat of the Night	Norman Jewison	The Graduate	Mike Nichols
1972	The Godfather	Francis Ford Coppola	Cabaret	Bob Fosse
1981	Chariots of Fire	Hugh Hudson	Reds	Warren Beatty
1989	Driving Miss Daisy	Bruce Beresford	Born on the Fourth of July	Oliver Stone
1998	Shakespeare in Love	John Madden	Saving Private Ryan	Steven Spielberg
2000	Gladiator	Ridley Scott	Traffic	Steven Soderbergh
2002	Chicago	Rob Marshall	The Pianist	Roman Polanski
2005	Crash	Paul Haggis	Brokeback Mountain	Ang Lee
2012	Argo	Ben Affleck	Life of Pi	Ang Lee
2013	12 Years a Slave	Steve McQueen	Gravity	Alfonso Cuarón
2015	Spotlight	Tom McCarthy	The Revenant	Alejandro G. Iñárritu
2016	Moonlight	Barry Jenkins	La La Land	Damien Chazelle
2018	Green Book	Peter Farrelly	Roma	Alfonso Cuarón
2021	CODA	Sian Heder	The Power of the Dog	Jane Campion

=== Nomination limit increased ===
On June 24, 2009, the Academy of Motion Picture Arts and Sciences (AMPAS) announced that the number of films to be nominated in the Best Picture award category would increase from 5 to 10, starting with the 82nd Academy Awards (2009). Although the Academy never officially said so, many commenters noted the expansion was likely in part a response to public criticism of The Dark Knight and WALL-E (both 2008) (and, in previous years, other blockbusters and popular films) not being nominated for Best Picture. Officially, the Academy said the rule change was a throwback to the Academy's early years in the 1930s and 1940s, when 8 to 12 films were nominated each year. "Having 10 Best Picture nominees is going to allow Academy voters to recognize and include some of the fantastic movies that often show up in the other Oscar categories but have been squeezed out of the race for the top prize," AMPAS President Sid Ganis said in a press conference. "I can't wait to see what that list of 10 looks like when the nominees are announced in February."

At the same time, the voting system was switched from first-past-the-post to instant runoff voting (also known as preferential voting). In 2011, the Academy revised the rule again so that the number of films nominated was between 5 and 10; nominated films must earn either 5% of first-place rankings or 5% after an abbreviated variation of the single transferable vote nominating process. Bruce Davis, the Academy executive director at the time, said, "A Best Picture nomination should be an indication of extraordinary merit. If there are only eight pictures that truly earn that honor in a given year, we shouldn't feel an obligation to round out the number." This system lasted until 2021, when the Academy reverted back to a set number of ten nominees from the 94th Academy Awards onward.

=== Language and country of origin ===
Twenty-one non-English language films have been nominated in the category: La Grande Illusion (French, 1938); Z (French, 1969); The Emigrants (Swedish, 1972); Cries and Whispers (Swedish, 1973); The Postman (Il Postino) (Italian/Spanish, 1995); Life Is Beautiful (Italian, 1998); Crouching Tiger, Hidden Dragon (Mandarin Chinese, 2000); Letters from Iwo Jima (Japanese, 2006, but ineligible for Best Foreign Language Film because it was an American production); Amour (French, 2012); Roma (Spanish/Mixtec, 2018); Parasite (Korean, 2019); Minari (Korean, 2020, but ineligible for Best International Feature Film because it was an American production); Drive My Car (Japanese/Korean/Mandarin Chinese/German/Korean Sign Language, 2021), All Quiet on the Western Front (German, 2022), Anatomy of a Fall (French, 2023), Past Lives (Korean, 2023, but ineligible for Best International Feature Film because it was an American production), The Zone of Interest (German/Polish/Yiddish, 2023), Emilia Pérez (Spanish, 2024), I'm Still Here (Portuguese, 2024), The Secret Agent (Portuguese, 2025), and Sentimental Value (Norwegian, 2025). Parasite became the first film not in English to win Best Picture.

Ten films wholly financed outside the United States have won Best Picture, eight of which were financed, in part or in whole, by the United Kingdom: Hamlet (1948), Tom Jones (1963), A Man for All Seasons (1966), Chariots of Fire (1981), Gandhi (1982), The Last Emperor (1987), Slumdog Millionaire (2008), and The King's Speech (2010). The ninth film, The Artist (2011), was financed in France, and the tenth film, Parasite (2019), was financed in South Korea.

=== Rating ===
Since 1968, most Best Picture winners have been rated R under the Motion Picture Association's rating system. Oliver! (1968) is the only G-rated film and Midnight Cowboy (1969) is the only X-rated film to win Best Picture although it has since been changed to an R rating. Eleven films have won with a PG rating: the first was Patton (1970) and the most recent was Driving Miss Daisy (1989). Eleven more films have won with a PG-13 rating (which was introduced in 1984): the first was The Last Emperor (1987) and the most recent was CODA (2021). For unrated films, A Room with a View (1985) is the first film to not be rated by the MPA and be nominated for Best Picture, though no unrated films have won Best Picture.

=== Genres and mediums ===
Three animated films have been nominated for Best Picture: Beauty and the Beast (1991), Up (2009), and Toy Story 3 (2010). The latter two were nominated after the Academy expanded the number of nominees, but none have won.

No comic book film has won, although three have been nominated: Skippy (1931), Black Panther (2018), and Joker (2019).

Two fantasy films have won: The Lord of the Rings: The Return of the King (2003) and The Shape of Water (2017), although more have been nominated.

The Silence of the Lambs (1991) is the only horror/thriller film to win Best Picture. Eight others have been nominated: The Exorcist (1973), Jaws (1975), The Sixth Sense (1999), Black Swan (2010), Get Out (2017), The Substance (2024), Frankenstein (2025), and Sinners (2025).

Several science-fiction films have been nominated for Best Picture, though Everything Everywhere All at Once (2022) was the first one to win.

Titanic (1997) is the only disaster film to win Best Picture, though other such films have been nominated, including Airport (1970) and The Towering Inferno (1974).

No documentary has been nominated for Best Picture, although Chang: A Drama of the Wilderness was nominated in the Unique and Artistic Picture category at the 1927/28 awards. A Best Documentary Feature category was introduced in 1942, but shared the category with documentary short films. Documentary features and documentary shorts received separate categories the following year.

Several musical adaptations based on material previously filmed in non-musical form have won Best Picture, including Gigi, West Side Story, My Fair Lady, The Sound of Music, Oliver!, and Chicago.

Several epics or historical epic films have won Best Picture, including the first recipient Wings. Others include Cimarron, Cavalcade, Gone with the Wind, The Bridge on the River Kwai, Ben-Hur, Lawrence of Arabia, Patton, The Godfather, The Godfather Part II, Gandhi, The Last Emperor, Dances With Wolves, Schindler's List, Forrest Gump, Braveheart, The English Patient, Titanic, Gladiator, The Lord of the Rings: The Return of the King, and Oppenheimer.

Several war films have been nominated for Best Picture, with Wings, All Quiet on the Western Front, From Here to Eternity, The Bridge on the River Kwai, Lawrence of Arabia, Patton, Platoon, and The Hurt Locker being some of the many winners.

=== Sequel nominations and winners ===
Ten films that were presented as direct sequels have been nominated for Best Picture: The Bells of St. Mary's (1945; the sequel to the 1944 winner, Going My Way), The Godfather Part II (1974), The Godfather Part III (1990), The Lord of the Rings: The Two Towers (2002), The Lord of the Rings: The Return of the King (2003), Toy Story 3 (2010), Mad Max: Fury Road (2015), Avatar: The Way of Water (2022), Top Gun: Maverick (2022), and Dune: Part Two (2024).

Toy Story 3, Mad Max: Fury Road, and Top Gun: Maverick are the only sequels to be nominated without any predecessors being nominated. The Godfather Part II and The Lord of the Rings: The Return of the King are the only sequels to have won the award, and their respective trilogies are the only series to have three films nominated. The Godfather series is the only film series with multiple Best Picture winners, with the first film winning the award for 1972 and the second film winning the award for 1974.

Another nominee, Broadway Melody of 1936, was a follow-up of sorts to previous winner The Broadway Melody, but beyond the title and some music, the two films have mutually independent stories. The Silence of the Lambs was adapted from the sequel novel to Red Dragon, which had been adapted for film as Manhunter by a different studio, but the two films have different casts and creative teams and were not presented as a series; an adaptation of Red Dragon in the same continuity as The Silence of the Lambs was later produced. Conversely, 2024's Wicked uses iconography and characters who appeared in 1939's The Wizard of Oz and other Oz films, but is not a direct prequel to any film.

The Lion in Winter features Peter O'Toole as King Henry II, a role he had played previously in the film Becket, but The Lion in Winter is not a sequel to Becket. Similarly, The Queen features Michael Sheen as Tony Blair, a role he had played previously in the television film The Deal. Christine Langan, producer of both productions, described The Queen as not being a direct sequel, only that it reunited the same creative team.

Clint Eastwood's Letters from Iwo Jima was a companion piece to his film Flags of Our Fathers that was released earlier the same year. These two films depict the same battle from the different viewpoints of Japanese and United States military forces; the two films were shot back-to-back.

In addition, Black Panther is a continuation of the events that occurred in Captain America: Civil War and the Marvel Cinematic Universe.

=== Remake nominations and winners ===
Along similar lines to sequels, there have been few nominees and winners that are either remakes or adaptations of the same source materials or subjects.

Ben-Hur, which won Best Picture of 1959, is a remake of the 1925 silent film with a similar title and both were adapted from Lew Wallace's 1880 novel Ben-Hur: A Tale of the Christ. The Departed, which won Best Picture of 2006, is a remake of the 2002 Hong Kong film Infernal Affairs and is the first remake of a non-English language or international film to win.

Other nominees include 1963's Cleopatra about the titular last queen of Egypt following the 1934 version, 2018's A Star Is Born following the 1937 film of the same name, and 2019's Little Women following the 1933 film of the same name with both being adaptations of the 1868 novel. True Grit, which was nominated for Best Picture at the 83rd Academy Awards, is the second adaptation of Charles Portis's 1968 novel following the 1969 film of the same name.

Four of the nominees for the 94th ceremony were based on source material previously made into films: CODA, Dune, Nightmare Alley, and West Side Story. The 2021 version of West Side Story became the second adaptation of the same source material for a previous Best Picture winner to be nominated for the same award after 1962's Mutiny on the Bounty. For that same ceremony, CODA became the second remake of a non-English-language or international film to win.

The 2022 German-language All Quiet on the Western Front is the second adaptation of the 1929 novel after the 1930 English-language film, and the third adaptation of the same source material of a previous Best Picture winner.

=== Silent film winners ===
Wings (1927), winner of the first Oscar for Best Picture

At the 1st Academy Awards, the Best Picture award (then named "Academy Award for Outstanding Picture") was presented to the 1927 silent film Wings.

The Artist (2011) was the first essentially silent (with the exception of a single scene of dialogue, and a dream sequence with sound effects) film since Wings to win Best Picture. It was the first silent nominee since 1928's The Patriot and the first Best Picture winner to be produced entirely in black and white since 1960's The Apartment. (Schindler's List, the 1993 winner, was predominantly black and white but contains some color sequences.)

=== Version availability ===
No Best Picture winner has been lost, though a few such as All Quiet on the Western Front and Lawrence of Arabia exist only in a form altered from their original, award-winning release form. This has usually been due to editing for reissue (and subsequently partly restored by archivists). Other winners and nominees, such as Tom Jones (prior to its 2018 reissues by The Criterion Collection and the British Film Institute) and Star Wars, are widely available only in subsequently altered versions. The Broadway Melody originally had some sequences photographed in two-color Technicolor. This footage survives only in black and white.

The 1928 film The Patriot is the only Best Picture nominee that is lost (about one-third is extant). The Racket, also from 1928, was believed lost for many years until a print was found in Howard Hughes' archives. It has since been restored and shown on Turner Classic Movies. The only surviving complete prints of 1931's East Lynne and 1934's The White Parade exist within the UCLA film archive.

=== Diversity standards ===
The Academy has established a set of "representation and inclusion standards", called Academy Aperture 2025, which a film is now required to satisfy in order to compete in the Best Picture category, starting with the 96th Academy Awards for films released in 2023. There are four general standards, of which a film must satisfy two to be considered for Best Picture: (a) on-screen representation, themes and narratives; (b) creative leadership and project team; (c) industry access and opportunities; and (d) audience development. As explained by Vox, the standards "basically break down into two big buckets: standards promoting more inclusive representation and standards promoting more inclusive employment". The standards are intended to provide greater opportunities for employment, in cast, crew, studio apprenticeships and internships, and development, marketing, publicity, and distribution executives, among underrepresented racial and ethnic groups, women, LGBTQ+ people, and persons with cognitive or physical disabilities, or who are deaf or hard of hearing.

These standards only apply to the Best Picture category and do not affect a film's eligibility in other Oscar categories. For the 94th and 95th Academy Awards (films released in 2021 and 2022), filmmakers were required to submit a confidential Academy Inclusion Standards form to be considered for Best Picture but were not required to fulfill the standards.

=== 2017 ceremony mistake ===
At the 89th Academy Awards on February 26, 2017, presenter Faye Dunaway read La La Land as the winner of the award. However, she and Warren Beatty had mistakenly been given the duplicate envelope for the "Best Actress in a Leading Role" award, which Emma Stone had won for her role in La La Land. While accepting the award, La La Land producer Jordan Horowitz, who was given the correct envelope, realized the mistake and announced that Moonlight had won the award.

== Criticisms and controversies ==
=== Nomination controversies ===
The selection of The Greatest Show on Earth rather than High Noon at the 25th Academy Awards was listed by Time among the 10 most controversial Best Picture races. Retrospectively, The Greatest Show on Earth has been considered by some to be one of the worst Best Picture winners in history.

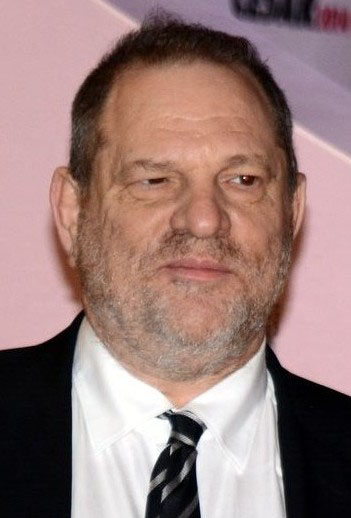
Harvey Weinstein (pictured in 2014)

Saving Private Ryan was immediately pegged as a favorite for the Best Picture category by many members and fans of Steven Spielberg's films, but it lost to Shakespeare in Love at the 71st Academy Awards. The Academy's decision was widely criticized. The choice was seen as one of the biggest upsets in the award's history, and led to DreamWorks executives (including Terry Press) and many industry pundits accusing Miramax Films and one of the Shakespeare in Love producers, Harvey Weinstein, of winning due to their award campaign's negative messaging against Saving Private Ryan rather than their own film's merits. Press stated that Weinstein and Miramax "tried to get everybody to believe that Saving Private Ryan was all in the first 15 minutes".

Critics and audiences criticized Extremely Loud & Incredibly Close's nomination for Best Picture at the 84th Academy Awards, with some calling the film one of the worst Best Picture nominees ever. Chris Krapek of HuffPost wrote very negatively about the film's nomination, calling the film "not only the worst reviewed Best Picture nominee of the last 10 years, [but] easily the worst film of 2011". Paste's Adam Vitcavage called the film's consensus for a Best Picture nominee "certainly the worst for at least 28 years", and David Gritten of The Telegraph called the nomination "mysterious".

The nomination of Emilia Pérez for Best Picture, among other categories, at the 97th Academy Awards was heavily criticized. Critics took issue with the film's portrayal of trans characters, and its portrayal of Mexican culture, including director Jacques Audiard's claims about the Spanish language being "a language of developing countries, it's a language of countries of few means, of poor people, of migrants." Karla Sofía Gascón, who plays the titular role, accused the team of fellow Best Picture nominee I'm Still Here (as well as its lead, fellow Best Actress nominee Fernanda Torres) of running a smear campaign against her and Emilia Pérez, which is explicitly against AMPAS's rules of campaigning. The accusations were found to be baseless and itself perceived as an attempt to smear Torres's and I'm Still Here's reputation. As attention grew around Gascón, a series of tweets in which she made several bigoted comments, of racist and Islamophobic nature, were unearthed by Canadian journalist Sarah Hagi. The majority of Oscar pundits agreed that this marked the end of Emilia Pérez's chances of winning Best Picture, although it was the year's most nominated film.

=== Diversity criticisms ===
In general, the awardees of that category have been criticized for disproportionately recognizing films about white men over those of women or non-white people. In opposition, the Academy's decision to favor Best Picture winning films with depiction of race relations among people of color—most primarily Driving Miss Daisy, Crash, and Green Book, all of which were directed by white filmmakers—led to significant backlash over racism against the Academy.

In 2005, Brokeback Mountain losing the Best Picture to Crash was heavily criticized, with some critics such as Kenneth Turan accusing the Academy members of homophobia and benefitting from making a non-groundbreaking choice in Crash, considered as one of the most notable Oscars upsets. After announcing the award, presenter Jack Nicholson was caught on camera mouthing the word "whoa" out of apparent surprise at the result. The film's use of moral quandary as a storytelling medium was widely reported as ironic, since many saw it as the "safe" alternative to Brokeback Mountain, which is about a gay relationship (the other nominees, Good Night, and Good Luck, Capote, and Munich also tackle heavy subjects of McCarthyism, homosexuality, and the Israeli-Palestinian conflict, respectively).

Though there have been exceptions like Barry Jenkins's Moonlight, films like Precious and Get Out have been seen as potentially being shut out of the race to win Best Picture because of older and white Academy voters choosing not to see them. From 2018 onwards, the Academy made an effort to add more younger, female, non-white, and non-American voters, and to create a non-voting "emeritus" status for people who had not worked in the film industry after a certain length of time, in order to diversify and rejuvenate their voter bloc.

=== Animated films in Best Picture category ===
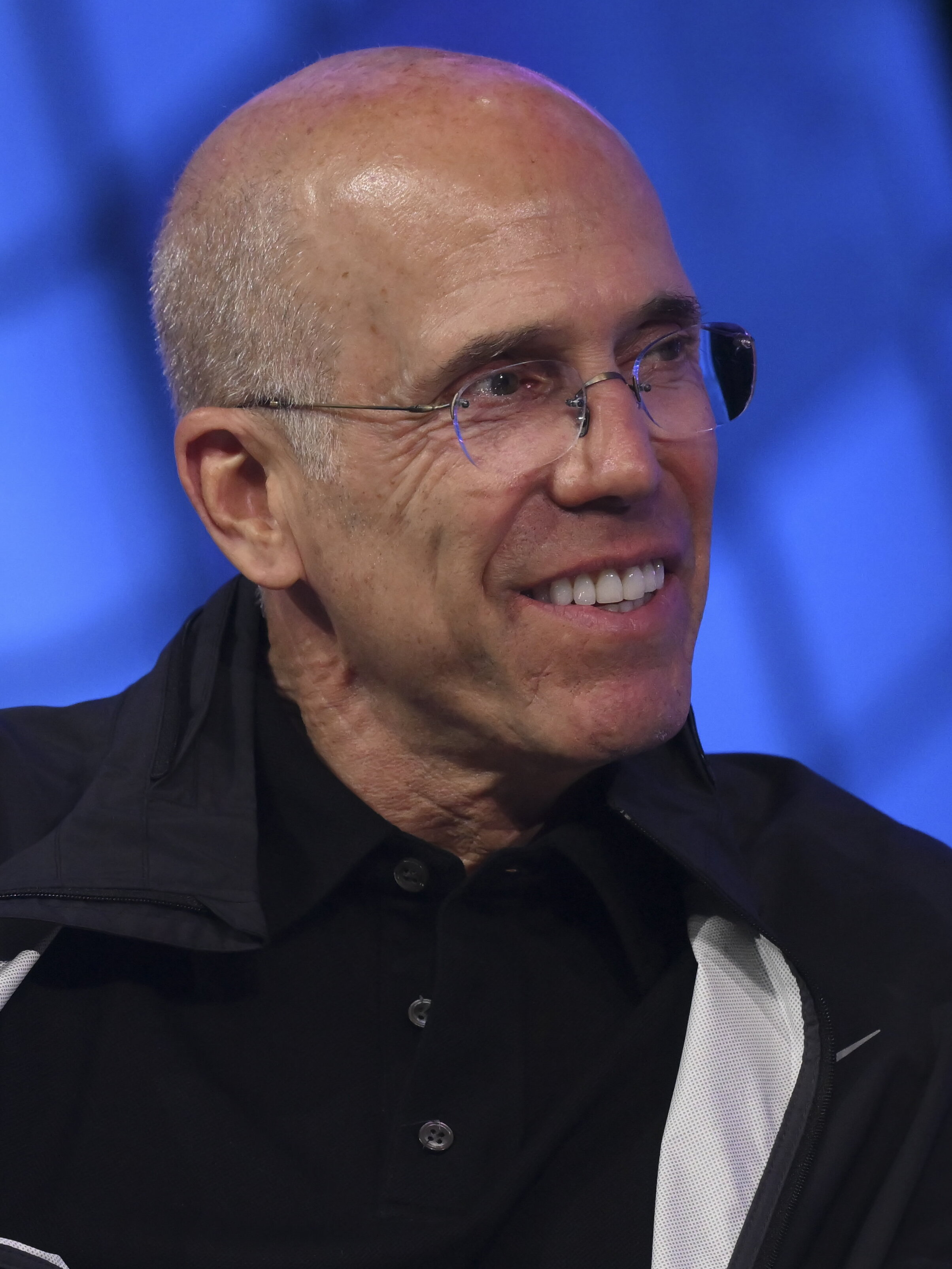
Jeffrey Katzenberg (pictured in 2022) was responsible for Beauty and the Beast being nominated for Best Picture

The category of Best Animated Feature was created for the 74th Academy Awards to ensure the recognition of animated films; prior to its creation, the only animated film ever nominated for Best Picture was 1991's Beauty and the Beast. However, the award has since received criticism on the grounds that it discourages animated films from being eligible to win Best Picture. While the Academy rules allow for a film to be nominated in both categories, only two animated films (Up and Toy Story 3) have been nominated for Best Picture since the creation of the two categories.

A prominent example was the 2001 film Shrek; DreamWorks CEO Jeffrey Katzenberg, who also served as producer, campaigned heavily for it to be awarded Best Picture, but it was not nominated in the category despite receiving nominations for a Golden Globe for Best Musical or Comedy, PGA Award for Best Theatrical Motion Picture, BAFTA Award for Best Film, and Critics' Choice Awards for Best Picture (and was the first animated film nominated in the latter three categories). Similarly, the 2008 film WALL-E received many accolades and garnered speculation that it might be nominated for Best Picture, but it was instead nominated for six categories, tying with Beauty and the Beast as the most nominated animated films in Oscar history, and won the award for Best Animated Feature Film. Other animated films that garnered Best Picture speculation but were ultimately not nominated include Guillermo del Toro's Pinocchio, The Boy and the Heron, and Spider-Man: Across the Spider-Verse with the former two films winning Best Animated Feature Film at back-to-back ceremonies.

== Winners and nominees ==
In the list below, winners are listed first in the gold row, followed by the other nominees. Except for the early years (when the Academy used a non-calendar year), the year shown is the one in which the film first premiered in Los Angeles County, California; normally this is also the year of first release, but it may be the year after first release (as with Casablanca and, if the film festival premiere is considered, Crash and The Hurt Locker). This is also the year before the ceremony at which the award is given; for example, a film exhibited theatrically during 2005 was eligible for consideration for the 2005 Best Picture Oscar, awarded in 2006. The number of the ceremony (1st, 2nd, etc.) appears in parentheses after the awards year, linked to the article on that ceremony. Each individual entry shows the title followed by nominee.

Until 1950, the Best Picture award was given to the production company; from 1951 on, it has gone to the producer or producers. The Academy used the producer credits of the Producers Guild of America (PGA) until 1998, when all five producers of Shakespeare in Love made speeches after its win. A three-producer limit has been applied some years since. There was controversy over the exclusion of some PGA-credited producers of Crash and Little Miss Sunshine. The Academy can make exceptions to the limit, as when Anthony Minghella and Sydney Pollack were posthumously among the four nominated for The Reader. However, now any number of producers on a film can be nominated for Best Picture, should they be deemed eligible.

For the first ceremony, three films were nominated for the award. For the following three years, five films were nominated for the award. This was expanded to eight in 1933, to ten in 1934, and to twelve in 1935, before being dropped back to ten in 1937. In 1945, it was further reduced to five. This number remained until 2009, when the limit was raised to ten; it was adjusted from 2011 to 2020 to vary between five and ten, but has been a full ten since 2022.

For the first six ceremonies, the eligibility period spanned two calendar years. For example, the 2nd Academy Awards presented on April 3, 1930, recognized films that were released between August 1, 1928, and July 31, 1929. Starting with the 7th Academy Awards, held in 1935, the period of eligibility became the full previous calendar year from January 1 to December 31. This has been the rule every year since except 2020, when the end date was extended to February 28, 2021, due to the COVID-19 pandemic, and 2021, which was correspondingly limited to March 1 to December 31.

Since 2023, the category's winners and nominees from the 1927/28 and 1928/29 ceremonies have entered the public domain.

indicates the winner

=== 1920s ===
Year of film release	Film	Film studio
1927/28 (1st)	Wings	Paramount (Lucien Hubbard, Jesse L. Lasky, B. P. Schulberg, & Adolph Zukor, producers)
1927/28 (1st)	7th Heaven	Fox (William Fox, producer)
1927/28 (1st)	The Racket	The Caddo Company (Howard Hughes, producer)
1928/29 (2nd) (Note: The 2nd Academy Awards is unique in being the only occasion where there were no official nominees. Subsequent research by AMPAS has resulted in a list of de facto nominees, based on records of which films were evaluated by the judges at the time.)	The Broadway Melody	Metro-Goldwyn-Mayer (Irving Thalberg & Lawrence Weingarten, producers)
1928/29 (2nd)	Alibi	Feature Productions (Roland West, producer)
1928/29 (2nd)	The Hollywood Revue	Metro-Goldwyn-Mayer (Irving Thalberg & Harry Rapf, producers)
1928/29 (2nd)	In Old Arizona	Fox (Winfield Sheehan, producer)
1928/29 (2nd)	The Patriot	Paramount

=== 1930s ===
Year of film release	Film	Film studio/Producer(s)
1929/30 (3rd)	All Quiet on the Western Front	Universal (Carl Laemmle) (Note: The film was produced by Carl Laemmle Jr., but the award was given to his father Carl Laemmle.)
1929/30 (3rd)	The Big House	Cosmopolitan (Irving Thalberg, producer)
1929/30 (3rd)	Disraeli	Warner Bros. (Jack L. Warner & Darryl F. Zanuck, producers)
1929/30 (3rd)	The Divorcee	Metro-Goldwyn-Mayer (Robert Z. Leonard, producer)
1929/30 (3rd)	The Love Parade	Paramount Famous Lasky (Ernst Lubitsch, producer)
1930/31 (4th)	Cimarron	RKO Radio (William LeBaron, producer)
1930/31 (4th)	East Lynne	Fox
1930/31 (4th)	The Front Page	The Caddo Company (Howard Hughes & Lewis Milestone, producers)
1930/31 (4th)	Skippy	Paramount Publix (Jesse L. Lasky, B. P. Schulberg, & Adolph Zukor, producers)
1930/31 (4th)	Trader Horn	Metro-Goldwyn-Mayer (Irving Thalberg, producer)
1931/32 (5th)	Grand Hotel	Metro-Goldwyn-Mayer (Irving Thalberg, producer)
1931/32 (5th)	Arrowsmith	Samuel Goldwyn Productions (Samuel Goldwyn, producer)
1931/32 (5th)	Bad Girl	Fox
1931/32 (5th)	The Champ	Metro-Goldwyn-Mayer (King Vidor, producer)
1931/32 (5th)	Five Star Final	First National (Hal B. Wallis, producer)
1931/32 (5th)	One Hour with You	Paramount Publix (Ernst Lubitsch, producer)
1931/32 (5th)	Shanghai Express	Paramount Publix (Adolph Zukor, producer)
1931/32 (5th)	The Smiling Lieutenant	Paramount Publix (Ernst Lubitsch, producer)
1932/33 (6th) (Note: The Academy also announced that A Farewell to Arms came in second, and Little Women third.)	Cavalcade	Fox (Frank Lloyd & Winfield Sheehan, producers)
1932/33 (6th)	42nd Street	Warner Bros.
1932/33 (6th)	A Farewell to Arms	Paramount
1932/33 (6th)	I Am a Fugitive from a Chain Gang	Warner Bros.
1932/33 (6th)	Lady for a Day	Columbia
1932/33 (6th)	Little Women	RKO Radio
1932/33 (6th)	The Private Life of Henry VIII	London Films
1932/33 (6th)	She Done Him Wrong	Paramount
1932/33 (6th)	Smilin' Through	Metro-Goldwyn-Mayer
1932/33 (6th)	State Fair	Fox
1934 (7th) (Note: The Academy also announced that The Barretts of Wimpole Street came in second, and The House of Rothschild third.)	It Happened One Night	Columbia (Frank Capra & Harry Cohn, producers)
1934 (7th)	The Barretts of Wimpole Street	Metro-Goldwyn-Mayer
1934 (7th)	Cleopatra	Paramount
1934 (7th)	Flirtation Walk	First National
1934 (7th)	The Gay Divorcee	RKO Radio
1934 (7th)	Here Comes the Navy	Warner Bros.
1934 (7th)	The House of Rothschild	20th Century
1934 (7th)	Imitation of Life	Universal
1934 (7th)	One Night of Love	Columbia
1934 (7th)	The Thin Man	Metro-Goldwyn-Mayer
1934 (7th)	Viva Villa!	Metro-Goldwyn-Mayer
1934 (7th)	The White Parade	Jesse L. Lasky (production company)
1935 (8th) (Note: The Academy also announced that The Informer came in second, and Captain Blood third.)	Mutiny on the Bounty	Metro-Goldwyn-Mayer (Frank Lloyd & Irving Thalberg, producers)
1935 (8th)	Alice Adams	RKO Radio
1935 (8th)	Broadway Melody of 1936	Metro-Goldwyn-Mayer
1935 (8th)	Captain Blood	Cosmopolitan
1935 (8th)	David Copperfield	Metro-Goldwyn-Mayer
1935 (8th)	The Informer	RKO Radio
1935 (8th)	The Lives of a Bengal Lancer	Paramount
1935 (8th)	A Midsummer Night's Dream	Warner Bros.
1935 (8th)	Les Misérables	20th Century
1935 (8th)	Naughty Marietta	Metro-Goldwyn-Mayer
1935 (8th)	Ruggles of Red Gap	Paramount
1935 (8th)	Top Hat	RKO Radio
1936 (9th)	The Great Ziegfeld	Metro-Goldwyn-Mayer (Hunt Stromberg, producer)
1936 (9th)	Anthony Adverse	Warner Bros.
1936 (9th)	Dodsworth	Samuel Goldwyn Productions (Samuel Goldwyn, producer)
1936 (9th)	Libeled Lady	Metro-Goldwyn-Mayer
1936 (9th)	Mr. Deeds Goes to Town	Columbia
1936 (9th)	Romeo and Juliet	Metro-Goldwyn-Mayer
1936 (9th)	San Francisco	Metro-Goldwyn-Mayer
1936 (9th)	The Story of Louis Pasteur	Cosmopolitan
1936 (9th)	A Tale of Two Cities	Metro-Goldwyn-Mayer
1936 (9th)	Three Smart Girls	Universal
1937 (10th)	The Life of Emile Zola	Warner Bros. (Henry Blanke, producer)
1937 (10th)	The Awful Truth	Columbia
1937 (10th)	Captains Courageous	Metro-Goldwyn-Mayer
1937 (10th)	Dead End	Samuel Goldwyn Productions (Samuel Goldwyn, producer)
1937 (10th)	The Good Earth	Metro-Goldwyn-Mayer
1937 (10th)	In Old Chicago	20th Century-Fox
1937 (10th)	Lost Horizon	Columbia
1937 (10th)	One Hundred Men and a Girl	Universal
1937 (10th)	Stage Door	RKO Radio
1937 (10th)	A Star Is Born	Selznick International Pictures
1938 (11th)	You Can't Take It with You	Columbia (Frank Capra, producer)
1938 (11th)	The Adventures of Robin Hood	Warner Bros.-First National
1938 (11th)	Alexander's Ragtime Band	20th Century-Fox
1938 (11th)	Boys Town	Metro-Goldwyn-Mayer
1938 (11th)	The Citadel	Metro-Goldwyn-Mayer
1938 (11th)	Four Daughters	Warner Bros.-First National
1938 (11th)	Grand Illusion	Réalisation d'art Cinématographique
1938 (11th)	Jezebel	Warner Bros.
1938 (11th)	Pygmalion	Metro-Goldwyn-Mayer
1938 (11th)	Test Pilot	Metro-Goldwyn-Mayer
1939 (12th)	Gone with the Wind	Metro-Goldwyn-Mayer (David O. Selznick, producer)
1939 (12th)	Dark Victory	Warner Bros.-First National
1939 (12th)	Goodbye, Mr. Chips	Metro-Goldwyn-Mayer
1939 (12th)	Love Affair	RKO Radio
1939 (12th)	Mr. Smith Goes to Washington	Columbia
1939 (12th)	Ninotchka	Metro-Goldwyn-Mayer
1939 (12th)	Of Mice and Men	Hal Roach (production company)
1939 (12th)	Stagecoach	Walter Wanger (production company)
1939 (12th)	The Wizard of Oz	Metro-Goldwyn-Mayer
1939 (12th)	Wuthering Heights	Samuel Goldwyn Productions

=== 1940s ===
Year of film release	Film	Film studio
1940 (13th)	Rebecca	Selznick International Pictures (David O. Selznick, producer)
1940 (13th)	All This, and Heaven Too	Warner Bros.
1940 (13th)	Foreign Correspondent	Walter Wanger (production company)
1940 (13th)	The Grapes of Wrath	20th Century-Fox
1940 (13th)	The Great Dictator	Charles Chaplin Productions
1940 (13th)	Kitty Foyle	RKO Radio
1940 (13th)	The Letter	Warner Bros.
1940 (13th)	The Long Voyage Home	Argosy-Wanger
1940 (13th)	Our Town	Sol Lesser (production company)
1940 (13th)	The Philadelphia Story	Metro-Goldwyn-Mayer
1941 (14th)	How Green Was My Valley	20th Century-Fox (Darryl F. Zanuck, producer)
1941 (14th)	Blossoms in the Dust	Metro-Goldwyn-Mayer
1941 (14th)	Citizen Kane	Mercury
1941 (14th)	Here Comes Mr. Jordan	Columbia
1941 (14th)	Hold Back the Dawn	Paramount
1941 (14th)	The Little Foxes	Samuel Goldwyn Productions (Samuel Goldwyn, producer)
1941 (14th)	The Maltese Falcon	Warner Bros.
1941 (14th)	One Foot in Heaven	Warner Bros.
1941 (14th)	Sergeant York	Warner Bros.
1941 (14th)	Suspicion	RKO Radio
1942 (15th)	Mrs. Miniver	Metro-Goldwyn-Mayer (Sidney Franklin, producer)
1942 (15th)	49th Parallel	Ortus
1942 (15th)	Kings Row	Warner Bros.
1942 (15th)	The Magnificent Ambersons	Mercury
1942 (15th)	The Pied Piper	20th Century-Fox
1942 (15th)	The Pride of the Yankees	Samuel Goldwyn Productions (Samuel Goldwyn, producer)
1942 (15th)	Random Harvest	Metro-Goldwyn-Mayer
1942 (15th)	The Talk of the Town	Columbia
1942 (15th)	Wake Island	Paramount
1942 (15th)	Yankee Doodle Dandy	Warner Bros.
1943 (16th)	Casablanca	Warner Bros. (Hal B. Wallis, producer)
1943 (16th)	For Whom the Bell Tolls	Paramount
1943 (16th)	Heaven Can Wait	20th Century-Fox
1943 (16th)	The Human Comedy	Metro-Goldwyn-Mayer
1943 (16th)	In Which We Serve	Two Cities Films
1943 (16th)	Madame Curie	Metro-Goldwyn-Mayer
1943 (16th)	The More the Merrier	Columbia
1943 (16th)	The Ox-Bow Incident	20th Century-Fox
1943 (16th)	The Song of Bernadette	20th Century-Fox
1943 (16th)	Watch on the Rhine	Warner Bros.
1944 (17th)	Going My Way	Paramount (Leo McCarey, producer)
1944 (17th)	Double Indemnity	Paramount
1944 (17th)	Gaslight	Metro-Goldwyn-Mayer
1944 (17th)	Since You Went Away	Selznick International Pictures (David O. Selznick, producer)
1944 (17th)	Wilson	20th Century-Fox
1945 (18th)	The Lost Weekend	Paramount (Charles Brackett, producer)
1945 (18th)	Anchors Aweigh	Metro-Goldwyn-Mayer
1945 (18th)	The Bells of St. Mary's	Rainbow Productions
1945 (18th)	Mildred Pierce	Warner Bros.
1945 (18th)	Spellbound	Selznick International Pictures (David O. Selznick, producer)
1946 (19th)	The Best Years of Our Lives	Samuel Goldwyn Productions (Samuel Goldwyn, producer)
1946 (19th)	Henry V	Two Cities Films
1946 (19th)	It's a Wonderful Life	Liberty Films
1946 (19th)	The Razor's Edge	20th Century-Fox
1946 (19th)	The Yearling	Metro-Goldwyn-Mayer
1947 (20th)	Gentleman's Agreement	20th Century-Fox (Darryl F. Zanuck, producer)
1947 (20th)	The Bishop's Wife	Samuel Goldwyn Productions (Samuel Goldwyn, producer)
1947 (20th)	Crossfire	RKO Radio
1947 (20th)	Great Expectations	J. Arthur Rank-Cineguild
1947 (20th)	Miracle on 34th Street	20th Century-Fox
1948 (21st)	Hamlet	J. Arthur Rank-Two Cities Films (Laurence Olivier, producer)
1948 (21st)	Johnny Belinda	Warner Bros.
1948 (21st)	The Red Shoes	J. Arthur Rank-Archers
1948 (21st)	The Snake Pit	20th Century-Fox
1948 (21st)	The Treasure of the Sierra Madre	Warner Bros.
1949 (22nd)	All the King's Men	Columbia (Robert Rossen, producer)
1949 (22nd)	Battleground	Metro-Goldwyn-Mayer
1949 (22nd)	The Heiress	Paramount
1949 (22nd)	A Letter to Three Wives	20th Century-Fox
1949 (22nd)	Twelve O'Clock High	20th Century-Fox

=== 1950s ===
Year of film release	Film	Film studio/Producer(s)
1950 (23rd)	All About Eve	20th Century-Fox (Darryl F. Zanuck, producer)
1950 (23rd)	Born Yesterday	Columbia
1950 (23rd)	Father of the Bride	Metro-Goldwyn-Mayer
1950 (23rd)	King Solomon's Mines	Metro-Goldwyn-Mayer
1950 (23rd)	Sunset Boulevard	Paramount
1951 (24th)	An American in Paris	Arthur Freed (Metro-Goldwyn-Mayer)
1951 (24th)	Decision Before Dawn	Anatole Litvak and Frank McCarthy
1951 (24th)	A Place in the Sun	George Stevens
1951 (24th)	Quo Vadis	Sam Zimbalist
1951 (24th)	A Streetcar Named Desire	Charles K. Feldman
1952 (25th)	The Greatest Show on Earth	Cecil B. DeMille (Paramount)
1952 (25th)	High Noon	Stanley Kramer
1952 (25th)	Ivanhoe	Pandro S. Berman
1952 (25th)	Moulin Rouge	John and James Woolf
1952 (25th)	The Quiet Man	John Ford and Merian C. Cooper
1953 (26th)	From Here to Eternity	Buddy Adler
1953 (26th)	Julius Caesar	John Houseman
1953 (26th)	The Robe	Frank Ross
1953 (26th)	Roman Holiday	William Wyler
1953 (26th)	Shane	George Stevens
1954 (27th)	On the Waterfront	Sam Spiegel
1954 (27th)	The Caine Mutiny	Stanley Kramer
1954 (27th)	The Country Girl	William Perlberg
1954 (27th)	Seven Brides for Seven Brothers	Jack Cummings
1954 (27th)	Three Coins in the Fountain	Sol C. Siegel
1955 (28th)	Marty	Harold Hecht
1955 (28th)	Love Is a Many-Splendored Thing	Buddy Adler
1955 (28th)	Mister Roberts	Leland Hayward
1955 (28th)	Picnic	Fred Kohlmar
1955 (28th)	The Rose Tattoo	Hal B. Wallis
1956 (29th)	Around the World in 80 Days	Michael Todd
1956 (29th)	Friendly Persuasion	William Wyler
1956 (29th)	Giant	George Stevens and Henry Ginsberg
1956 (29th)	The King and I	Charles Brackett
1956 (29th)	The Ten Commandments	Cecil B. DeMille
1957 (30th)	The Bridge on the River Kwai	Sam Spiegel
1957 (30th)	12 Angry Men	Henry Fonda and Reginald Rose
1957 (30th)	Peyton Place	Jerry Wald
1957 (30th)	Sayonara	William Goetz
1957 (30th)	Witness for the Prosecution	Arthur Hornblow Jr.
1958 (31st)	Gigi	Arthur Freed
1958 (31st)	Auntie Mame	Jack L. Warner
1958 (31st)	Cat on a Hot Tin Roof	Lawrence Weingarten
1958 (31st)	The Defiant Ones	Stanley Kramer
1958 (31st)	Separate Tables	Harold Hecht
1959 (32nd)	Ben-Hur	Sam Zimbalist
1959 (32nd)	Anatomy of a Murder	Otto Preminger
1959 (32nd)	The Diary of Anne Frank	George Stevens
1959 (32nd)	The Nun's Story	Henry Blanke
1959 (32nd)	Room at the Top	John and James Woolf

=== 1960s ===
Year of film release	Film	Producer(s)
1960 (33rd)	The Apartment	Billy Wilder
1960 (33rd)	The Alamo	John Wayne
1960 (33rd)	Elmer Gantry	Bernard Smith
1960 (33rd)	Sons and Lovers	Jerry Wald
1960 (33rd)	The Sundowners	Fred Zinnemann
1961 (34th)	West Side Story	Robert Wise
1961 (34th)	Fanny	Joshua Logan
1961 (34th)	The Guns of Navarone	Carl Foreman
1961 (34th)	The Hustler	Robert Rossen
1961 (34th)	Judgment at Nuremberg	Stanley Kramer
1962 (35th)	Lawrence of Arabia	Sam Spiegel
1962 (35th)	The Longest Day	Darryl F. Zanuck
1962 (35th)	The Music Man	Morton DaCosta
1962 (35th)	Mutiny on the Bounty	Aaron Rosenberg
1962 (35th)	To Kill a Mockingbird	Alan J. Pakula
1963 (36th)	Tom Jones	Tony Richardson
1963 (36th)	America America	Elia Kazan
1963 (36th)	Cleopatra	Walter Wanger
1963 (36th)	How the West Was Won	Bernard Smith
1963 (36th)	Lilies of the Field	Ralph Nelson
1964 (37th)	My Fair Lady	Jack L. Warner
1964 (37th)	Becket	Hal B. Wallis
1964 (37th)	Dr. Strangelove or: How I Learned to Stop Worrying and Love the Bomb	Stanley Kubrick
1964 (37th)	Mary Poppins	Walt Disney and Bill Walsh
1964 (37th)	Zorba the Greek	Michael Cacoyannis
1965 (38th)	The Sound of Music	Robert Wise
1965 (38th)	Darling	Joseph Janni
1965 (38th)	Doctor Zhivago	Carlo Ponti
1965 (38th)	Ship of Fools	Stanley Kramer
1965 (38th)	A Thousand Clowns	Fred Coe
1966 (39th)	A Man for All Seasons	Fred Zinnemann
1966 (39th)	Alfie	Lewis Gilbert
1966 (39th)	The Russians Are Coming, the Russians Are Coming	Norman Jewison
1966 (39th)	The Sand Pebbles	Robert Wise
1966 (39th)	Who's Afraid of Virginia Woolf?	Ernest Lehman
1967 (40th)	In the Heat of the Night	Walter Mirisch
1967 (40th)	Bonnie and Clyde	Warren Beatty
1967 (40th)	Doctor Dolittle	Arthur P. Jacobs
1967 (40th)	The Graduate	Lawrence Turman
1967 (40th)	Guess Who's Coming to Dinner	Stanley Kramer
1968 (41st)	Oliver!	John Woolf
1968 (41st)	Funny Girl	Ray Stark
1968 (41st)	The Lion in Winter	Martin Poll
1968 (41st)	Rachel, Rachel	Paul Newman
1968 (41st)	Romeo and Juliet	Anthony Havelock-Allan and John Brabourne
1969 (42nd)	Midnight Cowboy	Jerome Hellman
1969 (42nd)	Anne of the Thousand Days	Hal B. Wallis
1969 (42nd)	Butch Cassidy and the Sundance Kid	John Foreman
1969 (42nd)	Hello, Dolly!	Ernest Lehman
1969 (42nd)	Z	Jacques Perrin and Ahmed Rachedi

=== 1970s ===
Year of film release	Film	Producer(s)
1970 (43rd)	Patton	Frank McCarthy
1970 (43rd)	Airport	Ross Hunter
1970 (43rd)	Five Easy Pieces	Bob Rafelson and Richard Wechsler
1970 (43rd)	Love Story	Howard G. Minsky
1970 (43rd)	M*A*S*H	Ingo Preminger
1971 (44th)	The French Connection	Philip D'Antoni
1971 (44th)	A Clockwork Orange	Stanley Kubrick
1971 (44th)	Fiddler on the Roof	Norman Jewison
1971 (44th)	The Last Picture Show	Stephen J. Friedman
1971 (44th)	Nicholas and Alexandra	Sam Spiegel
1972 (45th)	The Godfather	Albert S. Ruddy
1972 (45th)	Cabaret	Cy Feuer
1972 (45th)	Deliverance	John Boorman
1972 (45th)	The Emigrants	Bengt Forslund
1972 (45th)	Sounder	Robert B. Radnitz
1973 (46th)	The Sting	Tony Bill, Michael Phillips, and Julia Phillips
1973 (46th)	American Graffiti	Francis Ford Coppola and Gary Kurtz
1973 (46th)	Cries and Whispers	Ingmar Bergman
1973 (46th)	The Exorcist	William Peter Blatty
1973 (46th)	A Touch of Class	Melvin Frank
1974 (47th)	The Godfather Part II	Francis Ford Coppola, Gray Frederickson, and Fred Roos
1974 (47th)	Chinatown	Robert Evans
1974 (47th)	The Conversation	Francis Ford Coppola
1974 (47th)	Lenny	Marvin Worth
1974 (47th)	The Towering Inferno	Irwin Allen
1975 (48th)	One Flew Over the Cuckoo's Nest	Michael Douglas and Saul Zaentz
1975 (48th)	Barry Lyndon	Stanley Kubrick
1975 (48th)	Dog Day Afternoon	Martin Bregman and Martin Elfand
1975 (48th)	Jaws	Richard D. Zanuck and David Brown
1975 (48th)	Nashville	Robert Altman
1976 (49th)	Rocky	Irwin Winkler and Robert Chartoff
1976 (49th)	All the President's Men	Walter Coblenz
1976 (49th)	Bound for Glory	Robert F. Blumofe and Harold Leventhal
1976 (49th)	Network	Howard Gottfried
1976 (49th)	Taxi Driver	Michael Phillips and Julia Phillips
1977 (50th)	Annie Hall	Charles H. Joffe
1977 (50th)	The Goodbye Girl	Ray Stark
1977 (50th)	Julia	Richard Roth
1977 (50th)	Star Wars	Gary Kurtz
1977 (50th)	The Turning Point	Herbert Ross and Arthur Laurents
1978 (51st)	The Deer Hunter	Barry Spikings, Michael Deeley, Michael Cimino, and John Peverall
1978 (51st)	Coming Home	Jerome Hellman
1978 (51st)	Heaven Can Wait	Warren Beatty
1978 (51st)	Midnight Express	Alan Marshall and David Puttnam
1978 (51st)	An Unmarried Woman	Paul Mazursky and Anthony Ray
1979 (52nd)	Kramer vs. Kramer	Stanley R. Jaffe
1979 (52nd)	All That Jazz	Robert Alan Aurthur
1979 (52nd)	Apocalypse Now	Francis Ford Coppola, Fred Roos, Gray Frederickson, and Tom Sternberg
1979 (52nd)	Breaking Away	Peter Yates
1979 (52nd)	Norma Rae	Tamara Asseyev and Alex Rose

=== 1980s ===
Year of film release	Film	Producer(s)
1980 (53rd)	Ordinary People	Ronald L. Schwary
1980 (53rd)	Coal Miner's Daughter	Bernard Schwartz
1980 (53rd)	The Elephant Man	Jonathan Sanger
1980 (53rd)	Raging Bull	Irwin Winkler and Robert Chartoff
1980 (53rd)	Tess	Claude Berri and Timothy Burrill
1981 (54th)	Chariots of Fire	David Puttnam
1981 (54th)	Atlantic City	Denis Héroux
1981 (54th)	On Golden Pond	Bruce Gilbert
1981 (54th)	Raiders of the Lost Ark	Frank Marshall
1981 (54th)	Reds	Warren Beatty
1982 (55th)	Gandhi	Richard Attenborough
1982 (55th)	E.T. the Extra-Terrestrial	Steven Spielberg and Kathleen Kennedy
1982 (55th)	Missing	Edward Lewis and Mildred Lewis
1982 (55th)	Tootsie	Sydney Pollack and Dick Richards
1982 (55th)	The Verdict	Richard D. Zanuck and David Brown
1983 (56th)	Terms of Endearment	James L. Brooks
1983 (56th)	The Big Chill	Michael Shamberg
1983 (56th)	The Dresser	Peter Yates
1983 (56th)	The Right Stuff	Irwin Winkler and Robert Chartoff
1983 (56th)	Tender Mercies	Philip S. Hobel
1984 (57th)	Amadeus	Saul Zaentz
1984 (57th)	The Killing Fields	David Puttnam
1984 (57th)	A Passage to India	John Brabourne and Richard Goodwin
1984 (57th)	Places in the Heart	Arlene Donovan
1984 (57th)	A Soldier's Story	Norman Jewison, Ronald L. Schwary, and Patrick J. Palmer
1985 (58th)	Out of Africa	Sydney Pollack
1985 (58th)	The Color Purple	Steven Spielberg, Kathleen Kennedy, Frank Marshall, and Quincy Jones
1985 (58th)	Kiss of the Spider Woman	David Weisman
1985 (58th)	Prizzi's Honor	John Foreman
1985 (58th)	Witness	Edward S. Feldman
1986 (59th)	Platoon	Arnold Kopelson
1986 (59th)	Children of a Lesser God	Burt Sugarman and Patrick J. Palmer
1986 (59th)	Hannah and Her Sisters	Robert Greenhut
1986 (59th)	The Mission	Fernando Ghia and David Puttnam
1986 (59th)	A Room with a View	Ismail Merchant
1987 (60th)	The Last Emperor	Jeremy Thomas
1987 (60th)	Broadcast News	James L. Brooks
1987 (60th)	Fatal Attraction	Stanley R. Jaffe and Sherry Lansing
1987 (60th)	Hope and Glory	John Boorman
1987 (60th)	Moonstruck	Patrick J. Palmer and Norman Jewison
1988 (61st)	Rain Man	Mark Johnson
1988 (61st)	The Accidental Tourist	Lawrence Kasdan, Charles Okun, and Michael Grillo
1988 (61st)	Dangerous Liaisons	Norma Heyman and Hank Moonjean
1988 (61st)	Mississippi Burning	Frederick Zollo and Robert F. Colesberry
1988 (61st)	Working Girl	Douglas Wick
1989 (62nd)	Driving Miss Daisy	Richard D. Zanuck and Lili Fini Zanuck
1989 (62nd)	Born on the Fourth of July	A. Kitman Ho and Oliver Stone
1989 (62nd)	Dead Poets Society	Steven Haft, Paul Junger Witt, and Tony Thomas
1989 (62nd)	Field of Dreams	Lawrence Gordon and Charles Gordon
1989 (62nd)	My Left Foot	Noel Pearson

=== 1990s ===
Year of film release	Film	Producer(s)
1990 (63rd)	Dances With Wolves	Jim Wilson and Kevin Costner
1990 (63rd)	Awakenings	Walter F. Parkes and Lawrence Lasker
1990 (63rd)	Ghost	Lisa Weinstein
1990 (63rd)	The Godfather Part III	Francis Ford Coppola
1990 (63rd)	Goodfellas	Irwin Winkler
1991 (64th)	The Silence of the Lambs	Edward Saxon, Kenneth Utt, and Ron Bozman
1991 (64th)	Beauty and the Beast	Don Hahn
1991 (64th)	Bugsy	Mark Johnson, Barry Levinson and Warren Beatty
1991 (64th)	JFK	A. Kitman Ho and Oliver Stone
1991 (64th)	The Prince of Tides	Barbra Streisand and Andrew Karsch
1992 (65th)	Unforgiven	Clint Eastwood
1992 (65th)	The Crying Game	Stephen Woolley
1992 (65th)	A Few Good Men	David Brown, Rob Reiner, and Andrew Scheinman
1992 (65th)	Howards End	Ismail Merchant
1992 (65th)	Scent of a Woman	Martin Brest
1993 (66th)	Schindler's List	Steven Spielberg, Gerald R. Molen, and Branko Lustig
1993 (66th)	The Fugitive	Arnold Kopelson
1993 (66th)	In the Name of the Father	Jim Sheridan
1993 (66th)	The Piano	Jan Chapman
1993 (66th)	The Remains of the Day	Mike Nichols, John Calley, and Ismail Merchant
1994 (67th)	Forrest Gump	Wendy Finerman, Steve Tisch, and Steve Starkey
1994 (67th)	Four Weddings and a Funeral	Duncan Kenworthy
1994 (67th)	Pulp Fiction	Lawrence Bender
1994 (67th)	Quiz Show	Michael Jacobs, Julian Krainin, Michael Nozik, and Robert Redford
1994 (67th)	The Shawshank Redemption	Niki Marvin
1995 (68th)	Braveheart	Mel Gibson, Alan Ladd Jr., and Bruce Davey
1995 (68th)	Apollo 13	Brian Grazer
1995 (68th)	Babe	Bill Miller, George Miller, and Doug Mitchell
1995 (68th)	Il Postino: The Postman	Mario Cecchi Gori, Vittorio Cecchi Gori, and Gaetano Daniele
1995 (68th)	Sense and Sensibility	Lindsay Doran
1996 (69th)	The English Patient	Saul Zaentz
1996 (69th)	Fargo	Ethan Coen
1996 (69th)	Jerry Maguire	James L. Brooks, Laurence Mark, Richard Sakai, and Cameron Crowe
1996 (69th)	Secrets & Lies	Simon Channing Williams
1996 (69th)	Shine	Jane Scott
1997 (70th)	Titanic	James Cameron and Jon Landau
1997 (70th)	As Good as It Gets	James L. Brooks, Bridget Johnson, and Kristi Zea
1997 (70th)	The Full Monty	Uberto Pasolini
1997 (70th)	Good Will Hunting	Lawrence Bender
1997 (70th)	L.A. Confidential	Curtis Hanson, Arnon Milchan, and Michael Nathanson
1998 (71st)	Shakespeare in Love	David Parfitt, Donna Gigliotti, Harvey Weinstein, Edward Zwick, and Marc Norman
1998 (71st)	Elizabeth	Alison Owen, Eric Fellner and Tim Bevan
1998 (71st)	Life Is Beautiful	Elda Ferri and Gianluigi Braschi
1998 (71st)	Saving Private Ryan	Steven Spielberg, Ian Bryce, Mark Gordon, and Gary Levinsohn
1998 (71st)	The Thin Red Line	Robert Michael Geisler, John Roberdeau, and Grant Hill
1999 (72nd)	American Beauty	Bruce Cohen and Dan Jinks
1999 (72nd)	The Cider House Rules	Richard N. Gladstein
1999 (72nd)	The Green Mile	Frank Darabont and David Valdes
1999 (72nd)	The Insider	Pieter Jan Brugge and Michael Mann
1999 (72nd)	The Sixth Sense	Frank Marshall, Kathleen Kennedy, and Barry Mendel

=== 2000s ===
Year of film release	Film	Producer(s)
2000 (73rd)	Gladiator	Douglas Wick, David Franzoni, and Branko Lustig
2000 (73rd)	Chocolat	David Brown, Kit Golden, and Leslie Holleran
2000 (73rd)	Crouching Tiger, Hidden Dragon	William Kong, Hsu Li-kong, and Ang Lee
2000 (73rd)	Erin Brockovich	Danny DeVito, Michael Shamberg, and Stacey Sher
2000 (73rd)	Traffic	Edward Zwick, Marshall Herskovitz, and Laura Bickford
2001 (74th)	A Beautiful Mind	Brian Grazer and Ron Howard
2001 (74th)	Gosford Park	Robert Altman, Bob Balaban, and David Levy
2001 (74th)	In the Bedroom	Graham Leader, Ross Katz, and Todd Field
2001 (74th)	The Lord of the Rings: The Fellowship of the Ring	Peter Jackson, Fran Walsh, and Barrie M. Osborne
2001 (74th)	Moulin Rouge!	Martin Brown, Baz Luhrmann, and Fred Baron
2002 (75th)	Chicago	Martin Richards
2002 (75th)	Gangs of New York	Alberto Grimaldi and Harvey Weinstein
2002 (75th)	The Hours	Scott Rudin and Robert Fox
2002 (75th)	The Lord of the Rings: The Two Towers	Barrie M. Osborne, Fran Walsh, and Peter Jackson
2002 (75th)	The Pianist	Roman Polanski, Robert Benmussa, and Alain Sarde
2003 (76th)	The Lord of the Rings: The Return of the King	Barrie M. Osborne, Peter Jackson, and Fran Walsh
2003 (76th)	Lost in Translation	Ross Katz and Sofia Coppola
2003 (76th)	Master and Commander: The Far Side of the World	Samuel Goldwyn Jr., Peter Weir, and Duncan Henderson
2003 (76th)	Mystic River	Robert Lorenz, Judie G. Hoyt, and Clint Eastwood
2003 (76th)	Seabiscuit	Kathleen Kennedy, Frank Marshall, and Gary Ross
2004 (77th)	Million Dollar Baby	Clint Eastwood, Albert S. Ruddy, and Tom Rosenberg
2004 (77th)	The Aviator	Michael Mann and Graham King
2004 (77th)	Finding Neverland	Richard N. Gladstein and Nellie Bellflower
2004 (77th)	Ray	Taylor Hackford, Stuart Benjamin, and Howard Baldwin
2004 (77th)	Sideways	Michael London
2005 (78th)	Crash	Paul Haggis and Cathy Schulman
2005 (78th)	Brokeback Mountain	Diana Ossana and James Schamus
2005 (78th)	Capote	Caroline Baron, William Vince, and Michael Ohoven
2005 (78th)	Good Night, and Good Luck	Grant Heslov
2005 (78th)	Munich	Steven Spielberg, Kathleen Kennedy, and Barry Mendel
2006 (79th)	The Departed	Graham King
2006 (79th)	Babel	Alejandro González Iñárritu, Steve Golin, and Jon Kilik
2006 (79th)	Letters from Iwo Jima	Clint Eastwood, Steven Spielberg, and Robert Lorenz
2006 (79th)	Little Miss Sunshine	David T. Friendly, Peter Saraf, and Marc Turtletaub
2006 (79th)	The Queen	Andy Harries, Christine Langan, and Tracey Seaward
2007 (80th)	No Country for Old Men	Scott Rudin, Joel Coen, and Ethan Coen
2007 (80th)	Atonement	Tim Bevan, Eric Fellner, and Paul Webster
2007 (80th)	Juno	Lianne Halfon, Mason Novick, and Russell Smith
2007 (80th)	Michael Clayton	Jennifer Fox, Kerry Orent, and Sydney Pollack
2007 (80th)	There Will Be Blood	Paul Thomas Anderson, Daniel Lupi, and JoAnne Sellar
2008 (81st)	Slumdog Millionaire	Christian Colson
2008 (81st)	The Curious Case of Benjamin Button	Kathleen Kennedy, Frank Marshall, and Ceán Chaffin
2008 (81st)	Frost/Nixon	Ron Howard, Brian Grazer, and Eric Fellner
2008 (81st)	Milk	Bruce Cohen and Dan Jinks
2008 (81st)	The Reader	Anthony Minghella, Sydney Pollack, Donna Gigliotti, and Redmond Morris
2009 (82nd)	The Hurt Locker	Kathryn Bigelow, Mark Boal, Nicolas Chartier, and Greg Shapiro
2009 (82nd)	Avatar	James Cameron and Jon Landau
2009 (82nd)	The Blind Side	Gil Netter, Andrew Kosove, and Broderick Johnson
2009 (82nd)	District 9	Peter Jackson and Carolynne Cunningham
2009 (82nd)	An Education	Finola Dwyer and Amanda Posey
2009 (82nd)	Inglourious Basterds	Lawrence Bender
2009 (82nd)	Precious: Based on the Novel "Push" by Sapphire	Lee Daniels, Sarah Siegel-Magness, and Gary Magness
2009 (82nd)	A Serious Man	Joel Coen and Ethan Coen
2009 (82nd)	Up	Jonas Rivera
2009 (82nd)	Up in the Air	Daniel Dubiecki, Ivan Reitman, and Jason Reitman

=== 2010s ===
Year of film release	Film	Producer(s)
2010 (83rd)	The King's Speech	Iain Canning, Emile Sherman, and Gareth Unwin
2010 (83rd)	Black Swan	Scott Franklin, Mike Medavoy, and Brian Oliver
2010 (83rd)	The Fighter	David Hoberman, Todd Lieberman, and Mark Wahlberg
2010 (83rd)	Inception	Christopher Nolan and Emma Thomas
2010 (83rd)	The Kids Are All Right	Gary Gilbert, Jeff Levy-Hinte, and Celine Rattray
2010 (83rd)	127 Hours	Danny Boyle, John Smithson, and Christian Colson
2010 (83rd)	The Social Network	Dana Brunetti, Ceán Chaffin, Michael De Luca, and Scott Rudin
2010 (83rd)	Toy Story 3	Darla K. Anderson
2010 (83rd)	True Grit	Joel Coen, Ethan Coen, and Scott Rudin
2010 (83rd)	Winter's Bone	Alix Madigan and Anne Rosellini
2011 (84th)	The Artist	Thomas Langmann
2011 (84th)	The Descendants	Jim Burke, Alexander Payne, and Jim Taylor
2011 (84th)	Extremely Loud & Incredibly Close	Scott Rudin
2011 (84th)	The Help	Brunson Green, Chris Columbus, and Michael Barnathan
2011 (84th)	Hugo	Graham King and Martin Scorsese
2011 (84th)	Midnight in Paris	Letty Aronson and Stephen Tenenbaum
2011 (84th)	Moneyball	Michael De Luca, Rachael Horovitz, and Brad Pitt
2011 (84th)	The Tree of Life	Sarah Green, Bill Pohlad, Dede Gardner, and Grant Hill
2011 (84th)	War Horse	Steven Spielberg and Kathleen Kennedy
2012 (85th)	Argo	Grant Heslov, Ben Affleck, and George Clooney
2012 (85th)	Amour	Margaret Ménégoz, Stefan Arndt, Veit Heiduschka, and Michael Katz
2012 (85th)	Beasts of the Southern Wild	Dan Janvey, Josh Penn, and Michael Gottwald
2012 (85th)	Django Unchained	Stacey Sher, Reginald Hudlin, and Pilar Savone
2012 (85th)	Life of Pi	Gil Netter, Ang Lee, and David Womark
2012 (85th)	Lincoln	Steven Spielberg and Kathleen Kennedy
2012 (85th)	Les Misérables	Tim Bevan, Eric Fellner, Debra Hayward, and Cameron Mackintosh
2012 (85th)	Silver Linings Playbook	Donna Gigliotti, Bruce Cohen, and Jonathan Gordon
2012 (85th)	Zero Dark Thirty	Mark Boal, Kathryn Bigelow, and Megan Ellison
2013 (86th)	12 Years a Slave	Brad Pitt, Dede Gardner, Jeremy Kleiner, Steve McQueen, and Anthony Katagas
2013 (86th)	American Hustle	Charles Roven, Richard Suckle, Megan Ellison, and Jonathan Gordon
2013 (86th)	Captain Phillips	Scott Rudin, Dana Brunetti, and Michael De Luca
2013 (86th)	Dallas Buyers Club	Robbie Brenner and Rachel Winter
2013 (86th)	Gravity	Alfonso Cuarón and David Heyman
2013 (86th)	Her	Megan Ellison, Spike Jonze, and Vincent Landay
2013 (86th)	Nebraska	Albert Berger and Ron Yerxa
2013 (86th)	Philomena	Gabrielle Tana, Steve Coogan, and Tracey Seaward
2013 (86th)	The Wolf of Wall Street	Martin Scorsese, Leonardo DiCaprio, Joey McFarland, and Emma Tillinger Koskoff
2014 (87th)	Birdman or (The Unexpected Virtue of Ignorance)	Alejandro González Iñárritu, John Lesher, and James W. Skotchdopole
2014 (87th)	American Sniper	Clint Eastwood, Andrew Lazar, Robert Lorenz, Bradley Cooper, and Peter Morgan
2014 (87th)	Boyhood	Richard Linklater and Cathleen Sutherland
2014 (87th)	The Grand Budapest Hotel	Wes Anderson, Scott Rudin, Steven Rales, and Jeremy Dawson
2014 (87th)	The Imitation Game	Nora Grossman, Ido Ostrowsky, and Teddy Schwarzman
2014 (87th)	Selma	Christian Colson, Oprah Winfrey, Dede Gardner, and Jeremy Kleiner
2014 (87th)	The Theory of Everything	Tim Bevan, Eric Fellner, Lisa Bruce, and Anthony McCarten
2014 (87th)	Whiplash	Jason Blum, Helen Estabrook, and David Lancaster
2015 (88th)	Spotlight	Blye Pagon Faust, Steve Golin, Nicole Rocklin, and Michael Sugar
2015 (88th)	The Big Short	Dede Gardner, Jeremy Kleiner, and Brad Pitt
2015 (88th)	Bridge of Spies	Steven Spielberg, Marc Platt, and Kristie Macosko Krieger
2015 (88th)	Brooklyn	Finola Dwyer and Amanda Posey
2015 (88th)	Mad Max: Fury Road	Doug Mitchell and George Miller
2015 (88th)	The Martian	Simon Kinberg, Ridley Scott, Michael Schaefer, and Mark Huffam
2015 (88th)	The Revenant	Arnon Milchan, Steve Golin, Alejandro González Iñárritu, Mary Parent, and Keith Redmon
2015 (88th)	Room	Ed Guiney
2016 (89th)	Moonlight	Adele Romanski, Dede Gardner, and Jeremy Kleiner
2016 (89th)	Arrival	Shawn Levy, Dan Levine, Aaron Ryder, and David Linde
2016 (89th)	Fences	Scott Rudin, Denzel Washington, and Todd Black
2016 (89th)	Hacksaw Ridge	Bill Mechanic and David Permut
2016 (89th)	Hell or High Water	Carla Hacken and Julie Yorn
2016 (89th)	Hidden Figures	Donna Gigliotti, Peter Chernin, Jenno Topping, Pharrell Williams, and Theodore Melfi
2016 (89th)	La La Land	Fred Berger, Jordan Horowitz, and Marc Platt
2016 (89th)	Lion	Emile Sherman, Iain Canning, and Angie Fielder
2016 (89th)	Manchester by the Sea	Matt Damon, Kimberly Steward, Chris Moore, Lauren Beck, and Kevin J. Walsh
2017 (90th)	The Shape of Water	Guillermo del Toro and J. Miles Dale
2017 (90th)	Call Me by Your Name	Peter Spears, Luca Guadagnino, Emilie Georges, and Marco Morabito
2017 (90th)	Darkest Hour	Tim Bevan, Eric Fellner, Lisa Bruce, Anthony McCarten, and Douglas Urbanski
2017 (90th)	Dunkirk	Emma Thomas and Christopher Nolan
2017 (90th)	Get Out	Sean McKittrick, Jason Blum, Edward H. Hamm Jr., and Jordan Peele
2017 (90th)	Lady Bird	Scott Rudin, Eli Bush, and Evelyn O'Neill
2017 (90th)	Phantom Thread	JoAnne Sellar, Paul Thomas Anderson, Megan Ellison, and Daniel Lupi
2017 (90th)	The Post	Amy Pascal, Steven Spielberg, and Kristie Macosko Krieger
2017 (90th)	Three Billboards Outside Ebbing, Missouri	Graham Broadbent, Peter Czernin, and Martin McDonagh
2018 (91st)	Green Book	Jim Burke, Charles B. Wessler, Brian Currie, Peter Farrelly, and Nick Vallelonga
2018 (91st)	Black Panther	Kevin Feige
2018 (91st)	BlacKkKlansman	Sean McKittrick, Jason Blum, Raymond Mansfield, Jordan Peele, and Spike Lee
2018 (91st)	Bohemian Rhapsody	Graham King
2018 (91st)	The Favourite	Ceci Dempsey, Ed Guiney, Lee Magiday, and Yorgos Lanthimos
2018 (91st)	Roma	Gabriela Rodríguez and Alfonso Cuarón
2018 (91st)	A Star Is Born	Bill Gerber, Bradley Cooper, and Lynette Howell Taylor
2018 (91st)	Vice	Dede Gardner, Jeremy Kleiner, Adam McKay, and Kevin Messick
2019 (92nd)	Parasite	Kwak Sin-ae and Bong Joon Ho
2019 (92nd)	Ford v Ferrari	Peter Chernin, Jenno Topping, and James Mangold
2019 (92nd)	The Irishman	Martin Scorsese, Robert De Niro, Jane Rosenthal, and Emma Tillinger Koskoff
2019 (92nd)	Jojo Rabbit	Carthew Neal, Taika Waititi, and Chelsea Winstanley
2019 (92nd)	Joker	Todd Phillips, Bradley Cooper, and Emma Tillinger Koskoff
2019 (92nd)	Little Women	Amy Pascal
2019 (92nd)	Marriage Story	Noah Baumbach and David Heyman
2019 (92nd)	1917	Sam Mendes, Pippa Harris, Jayne-Ann Tenggren, and Callum McDougall
2019 (92nd)	Once Upon a Time in Hollywood	David Heyman, Shannon McIntosh, and Quentin Tarantino

=== 2020s ===
Year of film release	Film	Producer(s)
2020/21 (Note: The eligibility period for the 93rd ceremony was extended through to February 28, 2021, due to the impact of the COVID-19 pandemic.) (93rd)	Nomadland	Frances McDormand, Peter Spears, Mollye Asher, Dan Janvey, and Chloé Zhao
2020/21 (93rd)	The Father	David Parfitt, Jean-Louis Livi, and Philippe Carcassonne
2020/21 (93rd)	Judas and the Black Messiah	Shaka King, Charles D. King, and Ryan Coogler
2020/21 (93rd)	Mank	Ceán Chaffin, Eric Roth, and Douglas Urbanski
2020/21 (93rd)	Minari	Christina Oh
2020/21 (93rd)	Promising Young Woman	Ben Browning, Ashley Fox, Emerald Fennell, and Josey McNamara
2020/21 (93rd)	Sound of Metal	Bert Hamelinck and Sacha Ben Harroche
2020/21 (93rd)	The Trial of the Chicago 7	Marc Platt and Stuart M. Besser
2021 (Note: As a consequence of the eligibility period for the 93rd ceremony being extended through to February 28, 2021, the eligibility period for the 94th ceremony was truncated to ten months, running from March 1 to December 31, 2021.) (94th)	CODA	Philippe Rousselet, Fabrice Gianfermi, and Patrick Wachsberger
2021 (94th)	Belfast	Laura Berwick, Kenneth Branagh, Becca Kovacik, and Tamar Thomas
2021 (94th)	Don't Look Up	Adam McKay and Kevin Messick
2021 (94th)	Drive My Car	Teruhisa Yamamoto
2021 (94th)	Dune	Mary Parent, Denis Villeneuve, and Cale Boyter
2021 (94th)	King Richard	Tim White, Trevor White, and Will Smith
2021 (94th)	Licorice Pizza	Sara Murphy, Adam Somner, and Paul Thomas Anderson
2021 (94th)	Nightmare Alley	Guillermo del Toro, J. Miles Dale, and Bradley Cooper
2021 (94th)	The Power of the Dog	Jane Campion, Tanya Seghatchian, Emile Sherman, Iain Canning, and Roger Frappier
2021 (94th)	West Side Story	Steven Spielberg and Kristie Macosko Krieger
2022 (95th)	Everything Everywhere All at Once	Daniel Kwan, Daniel Scheinert, and Jonathan Wang
2022 (95th)	All Quiet on the Western Front	Malte Grunert
2022 (95th)	Avatar: The Way of Water	James Cameron and Jon Landau
2022 (95th)	The Banshees of Inisherin	Graham Broadbent, Peter Czernin, and Martin McDonagh
2022 (95th)	Elvis	Baz Luhrmann, Catherine Martin, Gail Berman, Patrick McCormick, and Schuyler Weiss
2022 (95th)	The Fabelmans	Kristie Macosko Krieger, Steven Spielberg, and Tony Kushner
2022 (95th)	Tár	Todd Field, Alexandra Milchan, and Scott Lambert
2022 (95th)	Top Gun: Maverick	Tom Cruise, Christopher McQuarrie, David Ellison, and Jerry Bruckheimer
2022 (95th)	Triangle of Sadness	Erik Hemmendorff and Philippe Bober
2022 (95th)	Women Talking	Dede Gardner, Jeremy Kleiner, and Frances McDormand
2023 (96th)	Oppenheimer	Emma Thomas, Charles Roven, and Christopher Nolan
2023 (96th)	American Fiction	Ben LeClair, Nikos Karamigios, Cord Jefferson, and Jermaine Johnson
2023 (96th)	Anatomy of a Fall	Marie-Ange Luciani and David Thion
2023 (96th)	Barbie	David Heyman, Margot Robbie, Tom Ackerley, and Robbie Brenner
2023 (96th)	The Holdovers	Mark Johnson
2023 (96th)	Killers of the Flower Moon	Dan Friedkin, Bradley Thomas, Martin Scorsese, and Daniel Lupi
2023 (96th)	Maestro	Bradley Cooper, Steven Spielberg, Fred Berner, Amy Durning, and Kristie Macosko Krieger
2023 (96th)	Past Lives	David Hinojosa, Christine Vachon, and Pamela Koffler
2023 (96th)	Poor Things	Ed Guiney, Andrew Lowe, Yorgos Lanthimos, and Emma Stone
2023 (96th)	The Zone of Interest	James Wilson
2024 (97th)	Anora	Alex Coco, Samantha Quan, and Sean Baker
2024 (97th)	The Brutalist	Nick Gordon, Brian Young, Andrew Morrison, D.J. Gugenheim, and Brady Corbet
2024 (97th)	A Complete Unknown	Fred Berger, James Mangold, and Alex Heineman
2024 (97th)	Conclave	Tessa Ross, Juliette Howell, and Michael A. Jackman
2024 (97th)	Dune: Part Two	Mary Parent, Cale Boyter, Tanya Lapointe, and Denis Villeneuve
2024 (97th)	Emilia Pérez	Pascal Caucheteux and Jacques Audiard
2024 (97th)	I'm Still Here	Maria Carlota Bruno and Rodrigo Teixeira
2024 (97th)	Nickel Boys	Dede Gardner, Jeremy Kleiner, and Joslyn Barnes
2024 (97th)	The Substance	Coralie Fargeat, Tim Bevan, and Eric Fellner
2024 (97th)	Wicked	Marc Platt
2025 (98th)	One Battle After Another	Adam Somner, Sara Murphy, and Paul Thomas Anderson
2025 (98th)	Bugonia	Ed Guiney, Andrew Lowe, Yorgos Lanthimos, Emma Stone, and Lars Knudsen
2025 (98th)	F1	Chad Oman, Brad Pitt, Dede Gardner, Jeremy Kleiner, Joseph Kosinski, and Jerry Bruckheimer
2025 (98th)	Frankenstein	Guillermo del Toro, J. Miles Dale, and Scott Stuber
2025 (98th)	Hamnet	Liza Marshall, Pippa Harris, Nicolas Gonda, Steven Spielberg, and Sam Mendes
2025 (98th)	Marty Supreme	Eli Bush, Ronald Bronstein, Josh Safdie, Anthony Katagas, and Timothée Chalamet
2025 (98th)	The Secret Agent	Emilie Lesclaux
2025 (98th)	Sentimental Value	Maria Ekerhovd and Andrea Berentsen Ottmar
2025 (98th)	Sinners	Zinzi Coogler, Sev Ohanian, and Ryan Coogler
2025 (98th)	Train Dreams	Marissa McMahon, Teddy Schwarzman, Will Janowitz, Ashley Schlaifer, and Michael Heimler

== Age superlatives ==
Record	Producer	Film	Age
Oldest winner	Saul Zaentz	The English Patient	76 years, 24 days
Oldest nominee	Clint Eastwood	American Sniper	84 years, 229 days
Youngest winner	Carl Laemmle Jr.	All Quiet on the Western Front	22 years, 191 days
Youngest nominee	Carl Laemmle Jr.	All Quiet on the Western Front	22 years, 144 days

== Individuals with multiple wins ==
3 wins

- Sam Spiegel
- Saul Zaentz

2 wins

- Clint Eastwood
- Arthur Freed
- Dede Gardner
- Jeremy Kleiner
- Branko Lustig
- Albert S. Ruddy
- Robert Wise

== Individuals with multiple nominations ==
14 nominations

- Steven Spielberg

9 nominations

- Dede Gardner
- Scott Rudin

8 nominations

- Kathleen Kennedy

7 nominations

- Eric Fellner
- Jeremy Kleiner

6 nominations

- Tim Bevan
- Stanley Kramer

5 nominations

- Bradley Cooper
- Francis Ford Coppola
- Clint Eastwood
- Kristie Macosko Krieger
- Frank Marshall

4 nominations

- Paul Thomas Anderson
- Warren Beatty
- James L. Brooks
- David Brown
- Ethan Coen
- Megan Ellison
- Donna Gigliotti
- Ed Guiney
- Peter Jackson
- Norman Jewison
- Graham King
- Brad Pitt
- Marc Platt
- Sydney Pollack
- David Puttnam
- Martin Scorsese
- Sam Spiegel
- George Stevens
- Irwin Winkler

3 nominations

- Lawrence Bender
- Jason Blum
- James Cameron
- Iain Canning
- Ceán Chaffin
- Robert Chartoff
- Joel Coen
- Bruce Cohen
- Christian Colson
- J. Miles Dale
- Michael De Luca
- Guillermo del Toro
- Steve Golin
- Alejandro González Iñárritu
- Brian Grazer
- David Heyman
- Mark Johnson
- Stanley Kubrick
- Jon Landau
- Yorgos Lanthimos
- Robert Lorenz
- Daniel Lupi
- Ismail Merchant
- Christopher Nolan
- Barrie M. Osborne
- Patrick J. Palmer
- Mary Parent
- Emile Sherman
- Emma Thomas
- Emma Tillinger Koskoff
- Hal B. Wallis
- Fran Walsh
- Robert Wise
- Saul Zaentz
- Richard D. Zanuck

2 nominations

- Buddy Adler
- Robert Altman
- Fred Berger
- Kathryn Bigelow
- Mark Boal
- John Boorman
- Cale Boyter
- John Brabourne
- Robbie Brenner
- Graham Broadbent
- Jerry Bruckheimer
- Lisa Bruce
- Dana Brunetti
- Jim Burke
- Eli Bush
- Peter Chernin
- Ryan Coogler
- Alfonso Cuarón
- Peter Czernin
- Cecil B. DeMille
- Finola Dwyer
- Todd Field
- John Foreman
- Gray Frederickson
- Arthur Freed
- Richard N. Gladstein
- Jonathan Gordon
- Pippa Harris
- Jerome Hellman
- Grant Heslov
- Grant Hill
- Ron Howard
- Stanley R. Jaffe
- Dan Janvey
- Dan Jinks
- Anthony Katagas
- Ross Katz
- A. Kitman Ho
- Arnold Kopelson
- Gary Kurtz
- Ang Lee
- Ernest Lehman
- Baz Luhrmann
- Branko Lustig
- Michael Mann
- Anthony McCarten
- Frank McCarthy
- Martin McDonagh
- Frances McDormand
- Adam McKay
- Sean McKittrick
- Barry Mendel
- Sam Mendes
- Kevin Messick
- Arnon Milchan
- George Miller
- Doug Mitchell
- Sara Murphy
- Gil Netter
- David Parfitt
- Amy Pascal
- Jordan Peele
- Julia Phillips
- Michael Phillips
- Amanda Posey
- Fred Roos
- Charles Roven
- Albert S. Ruddy
- Tracey Seaward
- Teddy Schwarzman
- Ronald L. Schwary
- JoAnne Sellar
- Michael Shamberg
- Stacey Sher
- Bernard Smith
- Adam Somner
- Peter Spears
- Ray Stark
- Emma Stone
- Oliver Stone
- Jenno Topping
- Douglas Urbanski
- Denis Villeneuve
- Jerry Wald
- Jack L. Warner
- Harvey Weinstein
- Douglas Wick
- James Woolf
- John Woolf
- William Wyler
- Peter Yates
- Sam Zimbalist
- Fred Zinnemann
- Edward Zwick

== Production companies and distributors with multiple nominations and wins ==
Columbia Pictures and United Artists have the most wins with 12, while 20th Century Fox has the most nominations with 64.

Production company/distributor	Nominations	Wins
Columbia Pictures	56	12
United Artists	48	12
Paramount Pictures	22	11
Universal Pictures	37	10
Warner Bros. Pictures	29	10
Metro-Goldwyn-Mayer	40	9
20th Century Studios	64	8
Searchlight Pictures	23	5
Miramax Films	23	4
DreamWorks Pictures	15	4
Orion Pictures	9	4
Plan B Entertainment	9	3
FilmNation Entertainment	10	2
A24	9	2
Regency Enterprises	8	2
Neon	6	2
The Weinstein Company	6	2
Malpaso Productions	5	2
Selznick International Pictures	5	2
Amblin Entertainment	14	1
RKO Pictures	11	1
Samuel Goldwyn Productions	8	1
Lionsgate Films	5	1
Apple TV	3	1
New Line Cinema	3	1
Syncopy	3	1
Two Cities Films	3	1
Hear/Say Productions	2	1
Summit Entertainment	2	1
Focus Features	19	0
Netflix	12	0
Sony Pictures Classics	10	0
Working Title Films	10	0
Touchstone Pictures	6	0
TriStar Pictures	6	0
Annapurna Pictures	5	0
Amazon MGM Studios	4	0
Walt Disney Pictures	4	0
Blumhouse Productions	3	0
Cosmopolitan Productions	3	0
Gracie Films	3	0
The Caddo Company	2	0
Hollywood Pictures	2	0
Jerry Bruckheimer Films	2	0
LuckyChap Entertainment	2	0
Mercury	2	0
Pixar Animation Studios	2	0
Walter Wanger Productions	2	0

== See also ==
- Academy Aperture 2025
- BAFTA Award for Best Film
- Critics' Choice Movie Award for Best Picture
- Golden Globe Award for Best Motion Picture – Drama
- Golden Globe Award for Best Motion Picture – Musical or Comedy
- Golden Raspberry Award for Worst Picture
- Independent Spirit Award for Best Film
- Producers Guild of America Award for Best Theatrical Motion Picture
- Screen Actors Guild Award for Outstanding Performance by a Cast in a Motion Picture
- List of presenters of the Academy Award for Best Picture
- List of Academy Award–nominated films
- List of Academy Award–winning films
- List of Big Five Academy Award winners and nominees
- List of film production companies
- List of films voted the best
- Lists of films
- List of superlative Academy Award winners and nominees
