= Mitchell Stumpo =

American baseball player (born 1996)

- Pitcher
- Born: June 17, 1996 (age 30); Raleigh, North Carolina, U.S.
- Bats: Right Throws: Right

Mitchell Anthony Stumpo (born June 17, 1996) is an American former professional baseball pitcher.

== Career ==
Stumpo attended Ravenscroft School in Raleigh, North Carolina, and played college baseball at Guilford College in Greensboro, North Carolina, where he began pitching his sophomore year. As a senior in 2019, he went 4–3 with a 4.89 ERA over seventy innings. He went unselected in the 2019 Major League Baseball draft and signed with the Arizona Diamondbacks as an undrafted free agent.

Stumpo made his professional debut with the Rookie-level Arizona League Diamondbacks and was later promoted to the Missoula Osprey of the Rookie Advanced Pioneer League. Over 18 relief innings pitched, he went 1–1 with a 3.50 ERA and 24 strikeouts. He did not play a minor league game in 2020 due to the cancellation of the minor league season caused by the COVID-19 pandemic. He began the 2021 season with the Visalia Rawhide of the Low-A West and earned promotions to the Hillsboro Hops of the High-A West, the Amarillo Sod Poodles of the Double-A Central, and the Reno Aces of the Triple-A West during the season. Over 51 1/3 innings pitched in relief between the four teams, Stumpo went 1–1 with a 2.63 ERA and 66 strikeouts. He was selected to play in the Arizona Fall League for the Salt River Rafters after the season. He returned to Reno for the 2022 season. Over 45 relief appearances, he went 1–2 with a 3.53 ERA, 51 strikeouts, and 31 walks over 43 1/3 innings. To open the 2023 season, Stumpo was assigned to Reno. He also played for Amarillo. Over 42 relief appearances between the two teams, Stumpo went 1–6 with a 9.20 ERA, 46 walks, and 58 strikeouts over 44 innings.

Stumpo was released by the Diamondbacks organization on March 23, 2025.
