= Anton Gill (basketball) =

American basketball player (born 1994)

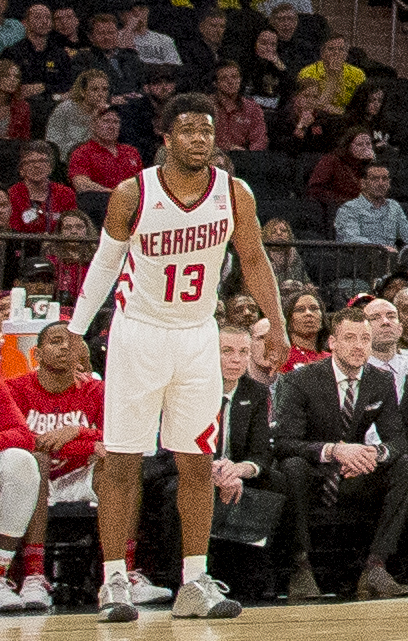

Al-Hashd
- Position: Point guard / shooting guard
- League: Iraqi Basketball League

Personal information
- Born: December 5, 1994 (age 31) Raleigh, North Carolina, U.S.
- Listed height: 6 ft 3 in (1.91 m)
- Listed weight: 195 lb (88 kg)

Career information
- High school: Ravenscroft School (Raleigh, North Carolina); Hargrave Military Academy (Chatham, Virginia)
- College: Louisville (2013–2015); Nebraska (2016–2018)
- NBA draft: 2018: undrafted
- Playing career: 2018–present

Career history
- 2018–2019: Lakeland Magic
- 2019: Fraser Valley Bandits
- 2019: Reales de La Vega
- 2020: Koiviston Kipinä Basket
- 2021: Corsarios de Cartagena
- 2022–present: Al-Hashd Al-Shaabi

Anton Brandon Gill (born December 5, 1994) is an American basketball player for Al-Hashd of the Iraqi Basketball League.

== High school career ==
Gill played three seasons at Ravenscroft School and led the team to a 78–14 record in that span. He was an AP first-team all-state selection as a junior. As a junior, he averaged 18.1 points, 6.3 rebounds, 3.1 assists and 1.3 steals per game and led the team to the Class 3A North Carolina state championship. In the state title win, Gill finished with 14 points, six rebounds and two assists. For his senior season, Gill transferred to Hargrave Military Academy. He averaged 28.2 points, 5.3 rebounds and 4.1 assists per game to help lead Hargrave to a 38–8 record. Gill's senior season included two 50-point games, including a school-record 56 points in a contest.

Gill was considered to be one of the top players in the class of 2013, as he was ranked 48th by ESPN and Scout, 50th by Rivals and 52nd by 247Sports. Gill received offers from Charlotte, East Carolina, Louisville, Miami (FL), NC State, Oklahoma State, South Carolina, Virginia Tech, Wake Forest, and Xavier. On December 21, 2011, Gill verbally committed to Louisville.

College recruiting
Name	Hometown	School	Height	Weight	Commit date
Anton Gill; SG	Raleigh, NC	Hargrave Military Academy	6 ft 3 in (1.91 m)	185 lb (84 kg)	Dec 21, 2011
Anton Gill; SG	Recruit ratings: Scout: Rivals: 247Sports:				
Overall recruit ranking: Scout: 48, 11 (SG) Rivals: 50, 13 (SG) ESPN: 48, 10 (SG)
Note: In many cases, Scout, Rivals, 247Sports, On3, and ESPN may conflict in their listings of height and weight.; In these cases, the average was taken. ESPN grades are on a 100-point scale.; Sources: "2013 Louisville Cardinals Commitment List". Rivals.; "Men's Basketball Recruiting". Scout.; "ESPN – Louisville Cardinals Basketball Recruiting 2013". ESPN.; "Scout.com Team Recruiting Rankings". Scout.; "2013 Team Ranking". Rivals.

== College career ==
Gill saw limited action in his freshman season at Louisville, averaging 1.3 points in 5.7 minutes per game. He increased his averages to 2.5 points in 9.4 minutes per game as a sophomore and had a season-high 15 points against Florida International. Gill scored seven points in Louisville's Sweet Sixteen victory over NC State. After the season, Gill opted to transfer to Nebraska.

After sitting out the 2015–16 season due to transfer rules, Gill appeared in 12 games (including one start) for the Huskers as a junior. On December 25, 2016, Gill suffered a ruptured patella tendon in his right knee during practice. The injury required surgery and ended Gill's season. Nebraska coach Tim Miles said watching the injury sickened him.

On December 20, 2017, Gill scored a career-high 21 points against UTSA, including a late eight points. Gill averaged 8.1 points and 1.9 rebounds per game as a senior, shooting 37.8 percent from behind the arc.

=== College statistics ===
Year	Team	GP	GS	MPG	FG%	3P%	FT%	RPG	APG	SPG	BPG	PPG
2013–14	Louisville	24	0	5.7	.324	.240	.333	0.7	0.2	0.2	0.0	1.3
2014–15	Louisville	31	0	9.4	.353	.256	.368	0.8	0.5	0.5	0.1	2.5
2016–17	Nebraska	12	1	17.3	.271	.276	.625	1.9	0.5	0.3	0.0	3.8
2017–18	Nebraska	31	14	24.5	.399	.378	.829	1.9	1.1	0.5	0.1	8.1
Career		97	15	14.4	.362	.329	.625	1.3	0.6	0.4	0.1	4.2

== Professional career ==
On October 23, 2018, Gill was included in the training camp roster of the Lakeland Magic. In 2019, he signed with the Fraser Valley Bandits of the Canadian Elite Basketball League. Gill averaged 12.9 points, 2.6 rebounds and 1.8 assists per game in eight games in the CEBL. He joined Reales de La Vega of the Dominican Liga Nacional de Baloncesto in October 2019 in the semifinals. In January 2020, Gill signed with Koiviston Kipinä Basket in Finland. Gill played four games for Kipinä Basket before season was abruptly ended because of COVID-19. With Gill's lead Kipinä Basket won all those four games and topped their league. Gill averaged 44.3 points per game, including 47 points in 89–84 away win against league's second-placed team Joensuun Kataja II. Eventually Kipinä Basket got promoted as a best-ranked team in their division.

In October 2021, Gill joined Corsarios de Cartagena, a team which made its debut in the Baloncesto Profesional Colombiano. In five games he averaged 16.2 points, 5.2 rebounds, 4.0 assists and 1.4 steals per game. On February 10, 2022, Gill signed with Al-Hashd Al-Shaabi of the Iraqi Basketball League.

== Personal life ==
Gill was born on December 5, 1994, in Raleigh, North Carolina, the son of Anton and Shauntell Gill. His father played basketball for East Carolina and was named to the first team All-Colonial Athletic Conference in 1995. Gill has two younger sisters, Ashley and Aliya. Gill majored in Communication Studies at Nebraska and was on the 2015 All-Atlantic Coast Conference Academic Men's Basketball team at Louisville.
