= List of presenters of the Academy Award for Best Picture =

Each year, the Academy Award for Best Picture is presented by one or more actors on behalf of the Academy of Motion Picture Arts and Sciences. Best Picture is traditionally the final award presented during the annual ceremonies, as this award represents a culmination of all factors of the filmmaking process. The presenter of the award is typically kept unannounced until the very moment. Jack Nicholson has presented the award more times than any other individual, at eight times, followed by Audrey Hepburn and Warren Beatty, who have presented the award four times each.

== List of presenters ==
Ceremony	Film year	Date of ceremony	Presenter(s)	Best Picture
1st	1928	May 16, 1929	Douglas Fairbanks	Wings
2nd	1929	April 3, 1930	William C. deMille	The Broadway Melody
3rd	1930	November 5, 1930	Louis B. Mayer	All Quiet on the Western Front
4th	1931	November 10, 1931	B. P. Schulberg	Cimarron
5th	1932	November 18, 1932	William LeBaron	Grand Hotel
6th	1933	March 16, 1934	Will Rogers	Cavalcade
7th	1934	February 27, 1935	Irvin S. Cobb	It Happened One Night
8th	1935	March 5, 1936	Frank Capra	Mutiny on the Bounty
9th	1936	March 4, 1937	George Jessel	The Great Ziegfeld
10th	1937	March 10, 1938	Frank Capra (2)	The Life of Emile Zola
11th	1938	February 23, 1939	James Roosevelt	You Can't Take It with You
12th	1939	February 29, 1940	Y. Frank Freeman	Gone with the Wind
13th	1940	February 27, 1941	Mervyn LeRoy	Rebecca
14th	1941	February 26, 1942	David O. Selznick	How Green Was My Valley
15th	1942	March 4, 1943	William Goetz	Mrs. Miniver
16th	1943	March 2, 1944	Sidney Franklin	Casablanca
17th	1944	March 15, 1945	Hal B. Wallis	Going My Way
18th	1945	March 7, 1946	Eric Johnston	The Lost Weekend
19th	1946	March 13, 1947	Eric Johnston (2)	The Best Years of Our Lives
20th	1947	March 20, 1948	Fredric March	Gentleman's Agreement
21st	1948	March 24, 1949	Ethel Barrymore	Hamlet
22nd	1949	March 23, 1950	James Cagney	All the King's Men
23rd	1950	March 29, 1951	Ralph Bunche	All About Eve
24th	1951	March 20, 1952	Jesse Lasky	An American in Paris
25th	1952	March 19, 1953	Mary Pickford	The Greatest Show on Earth
26th	1953	March 25, 1954	Cecil B. DeMille	From Here to Eternity
27th	1954	March 30, 1955	Buddy Adler	On the Waterfront
28th	1955	March 21, 1956	Audrey Hepburn	Marty
29th	1956	March 27, 1957	Janet Gaynor	Around the World in 80 Days
30th	1957	March 26, 1958	Gary Cooper	The Bridge on the River Kwai
31st	1958	April 6, 1959	Ingrid Bergman	Gigi
32nd	1959	April 4, 1960	Gary Cooper (2)	Ben-Hur
33rd	1960	April 17, 1961	Audrey Hepburn (2)	The Apartment
34th	1961	April 9, 1962	Fred Astaire	West Side Story
35th	1962	April 8, 1963	Olivia de Havilland	Lawrence of Arabia
36th	1963	April 13, 1964	Frank Sinatra	Tom Jones
37th	1964	April 5, 1965	Gregory Peck	My Fair Lady
38th	1965	April 18, 1966	Jack Lemmon	The Sound of Music
39th	1966	April 10, 1967	Audrey Hepburn (3)	A Man for All Seasons
40th	1967	April 10, 1968	Julie Andrews	In the Heat of the Night
41st	1968	April 14, 1969	Sidney Poitier	Oliver!
42nd	1969	April 7, 1970	Elizabeth Taylor	Midnight Cowboy
43rd	1970	April 15, 1971	Steve McQueen	Patton
44th	1971	April 10, 1972	Jack Nicholson	The French Connection
45th	1972	March 27, 1973	Clint Eastwood	The Godfather
46th	1973	April 2, 1974	Elizabeth Taylor (2)	The Sting
47th	1974	April 8, 1975	Warren Beatty	The Godfather Part II
48th	1975	March 29, 1976	Audrey Hepburn (4)	One Flew Over the Cuckoo's Nest
49th	1976	March 28, 1977	Jack Nicholson (2)	Rocky
50th	1977	April 3, 1978	Jack Nicholson (3)	Annie Hall
51st	1978	April 9, 1979	John Wayne	The Deer Hunter
52nd	1979	April 14, 1980	Charlton Heston	Kramer vs. Kramer
53rd	1980	March 31, 1981	Lillian Gish	Ordinary People
54th	1981	March 29, 1982	Loretta Young	Chariots of Fire
55th	1982	April 11, 1983	Carol Burnett	Gandhi
56th	1983	April 9, 1984	Frank Capra (3)	Terms of Endearment
57th	1984	March 25, 1985	Laurence Olivier	Amadeus
58th	1985	March 24, 1986	John Huston, Akira Kurosawa, and Billy Wilder	Out of Africa
59th	1986	March 30, 1987	Dustin Hoffman	Platoon
60th	1987	April 11, 1988	Eddie Murphy	The Last Emperor
61st	1988	March 29, 1989	Cher	Rain Man
62nd	1989	March 26, 1990	Warren Beatty (2) and Jack Nicholson (4)	Driving Miss Daisy
63rd	1990	March 25, 1991	Barbra Streisand	Dances with Wolves
64th	1991	March 30, 1992	Paul Newman and Elizabeth Taylor (3)	The Silence of the Lambs
65th	1992	March 29, 1993	Jack Nicholson (5)	Unforgiven
66th	1993	March 21, 1994	Harrison Ford	Schindler's List
67th	1994	March 27, 1995	Robert De Niro and Al Pacino	Forrest Gump
68th	1995	March 25, 1996	Sidney Poitier (2)	Braveheart
69th	1996	March 24, 1997	Al Pacino (2)	The English Patient
70th	1997	March 23, 1998	Sean Connery	Titanic
71st	1998	March 21, 1999	Harrison Ford (2)	Shakespeare in Love
72nd	1999	March 26, 2000	Clint Eastwood (2)	American Beauty
73rd	2000	March 25, 2001	Michael Douglas	Gladiator
74th	2001	March 24, 2002	Tom Hanks	A Beautiful Mind
75th	2002	March 23, 2003	Kirk Douglas and Michael Douglas (2)	Chicago
76th	2003	February 29, 2004	Steven Spielberg	The Lord of the Rings: The Return of the King
77th	2004	February 27, 2005	Dustin Hoffman (2) and Barbra Streisand (2)	Million Dollar Baby
78th	2005	March 5, 2006	Jack Nicholson (6)	Crash
79th	2006	February 25, 2007	Diane Keaton and Jack Nicholson (7)	The Departed
80th	2007	February 24, 2008	Denzel Washington	No Country for Old Men
81st	2008	February 22, 2009	Steven Spielberg (2)	Slumdog Millionaire
82nd	2009	March 7, 2010	Tom Hanks (2)	The Hurt Locker
83rd	2010	February 27, 2011	Steven Spielberg (3)	The King's Speech
84th	2011	February 26, 2012	Tom Cruise	The Artist
85th	2012	February 24, 2013	Michelle Obama and Jack Nicholson (8)	Argo
86th	2013	March 2, 2014	Will Smith	12 Years a Slave
87th	2014	February 22, 2015	Sean Penn	Birdman or (The Unexpected Virtue of Ignorance)
88th	2015	February 28, 2016	Morgan Freeman	Spotlight
89th	2016	February 26, 2017	Warren Beatty (3) and Faye Dunaway	Moonlight^{†}
90th	2017	March 4, 2018	Warren Beatty (4) and Faye Dunaway (2)	The Shape of Water
91st	2018	February 24, 2019	Julia Roberts	Green Book
92nd	2019	February 9, 2020	Jane Fonda	Parasite
93rd	2020	April 25, 2021	Rita Moreno	Nomadland
94th	2021	March 27, 2022	Lady Gaga and Liza Minnelli	CODA
95th	2022	March 12, 2023	Harrison Ford (3)	Everything Everywhere All at Once
96th	2023	March 10, 2024	Al Pacino (3)	Oppenheimer
97th	2024	March 2, 2025	Billy Crystal and Meg Ryan	Anora
98th	2025	March 15, 2026	Nicole Kidman and Ewan McGregor	One Battle After Another

== Notes ==
^†At the 89th Academy Awards, the presenters of the award, Warren Beatty and Faye Dunaway, mistakenly announced La La Land as the winner of Best Picture, after they had been given the envelope for Best Actress – containing the name of Emma Stone and La La Land, the film for which she won Best Actress. A few minutes later, after the mistake came to light, one of La La Land's producers, Jordan Horowitz, informed the audience that Moonlight was the true winner.

== See also ==
- Academy Award
- Academy Award for Best Picture
