= Ido Ostrowsky =

American film producer (born 1979)

Ido Ostrowsky (born 1979) is an American film producer. He and his producing partner Nora Grossman run Bristol Automotive, a production company that they founded in 2012. He produced the 2014 film The Imitation Game, for which he was nominated for the Academy Award for Best Picture at the 87th Academy Awards.

== Career ==
Ostrowsky was raised in a Jewish family and attended the University of California, Los Angeles, where he majored in mass communications. After graduating, he worked as an assistant in the television industry, which included a job as a writers' assistant on the series Gossip Girl. In 2009, after hearing about the official apology issued to computer scientist Alan Turing by British Prime Minister Gordon Brown, he optioned the rights to Andrew Hodges' biography of Turing, Alan Turing: The Enigma, with his friend and producing partner Nora Grossman. Screenwriter Graham Moore wrote a screenplay based on the book and in 2011 Ostrowsky and Grossman sold the script to Warner Bros. In 2012, they founded a production company, Bristol Automotive, and reclaimed Moore's script from Warner Bros. since production had not started on the film after a year, as their contract stipulated. They then partnered with a third producer, Teddy Schwarzman, who funded the film's budget. The final film, The Imitation Game, was released in 2014.

Ostrowsky, Grossman and Schwarzman received numerous accolades for their work on The Imitation Game, including nominations for the Academy Award for Best Picture, the BAFTA Award for Best Film, and the Producers Guild of America Award for Best Theatrical Motion Picture. Ostrowsky and Grossman were named among Variety's "10 Producers to Watch" in 2014.

== Personal life ==
Ostrowsky was born in Israel and moved to Los Angeles as a one-year-old in 1980. He is of Russian-Jewish heritage and is openly gay.
