= Nora Grossman =

American film producer

Nora Grossman is an American film producer. She and her producing partner Ido Ostrowsky run Bristol Automotive, a production company that they founded in 2012. She produced the 2014 film The Imitation Game, for which she was nominated for the Academy Award for Best Picture at the 87th Academy Awards.

== Biography ==
Grossman was born to a Jewish family in Los Angeles and moved to Raleigh as a child. She graduated from Ravenscroft School in 2001 and went on to attend Boston University, where she studied film and television. After graduating in 2005, she worked in various jobs in the television industry, including as a junior executive at the production company of Paul Scheuring.

In 2009, after hearing about the official apology issued to computer scientist Alan Turing by British Prime Minister Gordon Brown, she optioned the rights to Andrew Hodges' biography of Turing, Alan Turing: The Enigma, with her friend and producing partner Ido Ostrowsky. She travelled to London to meet with Hodges in person to request the rights to his book even though she had no experience as a film producer. Another of her friends, screenwriter Graham Moore, wrote a screenplay based on the book and in 2011 Grossman and Ostrowsky sold the script to Warner Bros. In 2012, Grossman and Ostrowsky founded a production company, Bristol Automotive, and reclaimed Moore's script from Warner Bros. since production had not started on the film after a year. They then partnered with a third producer, Teddy Schwarzman, who funded the film's budget. The final film, The Imitation Game, was released in 2014.

Grossman, Ostrowsky and Schwarzman received numerous accolades for their work on The Imitation Game, including nominations for the Academy Award for Best Picture, the BAFTA Award for Best Film, and the Producers Guild of America Award for Best Theatrical Motion Picture. Grossman and Ostrowsky were named among Variety's "10 Producers to Watch" in 2014.
