= Ravenscroft School =

School in Raleigh, North Carolina, US

Ravenscroft
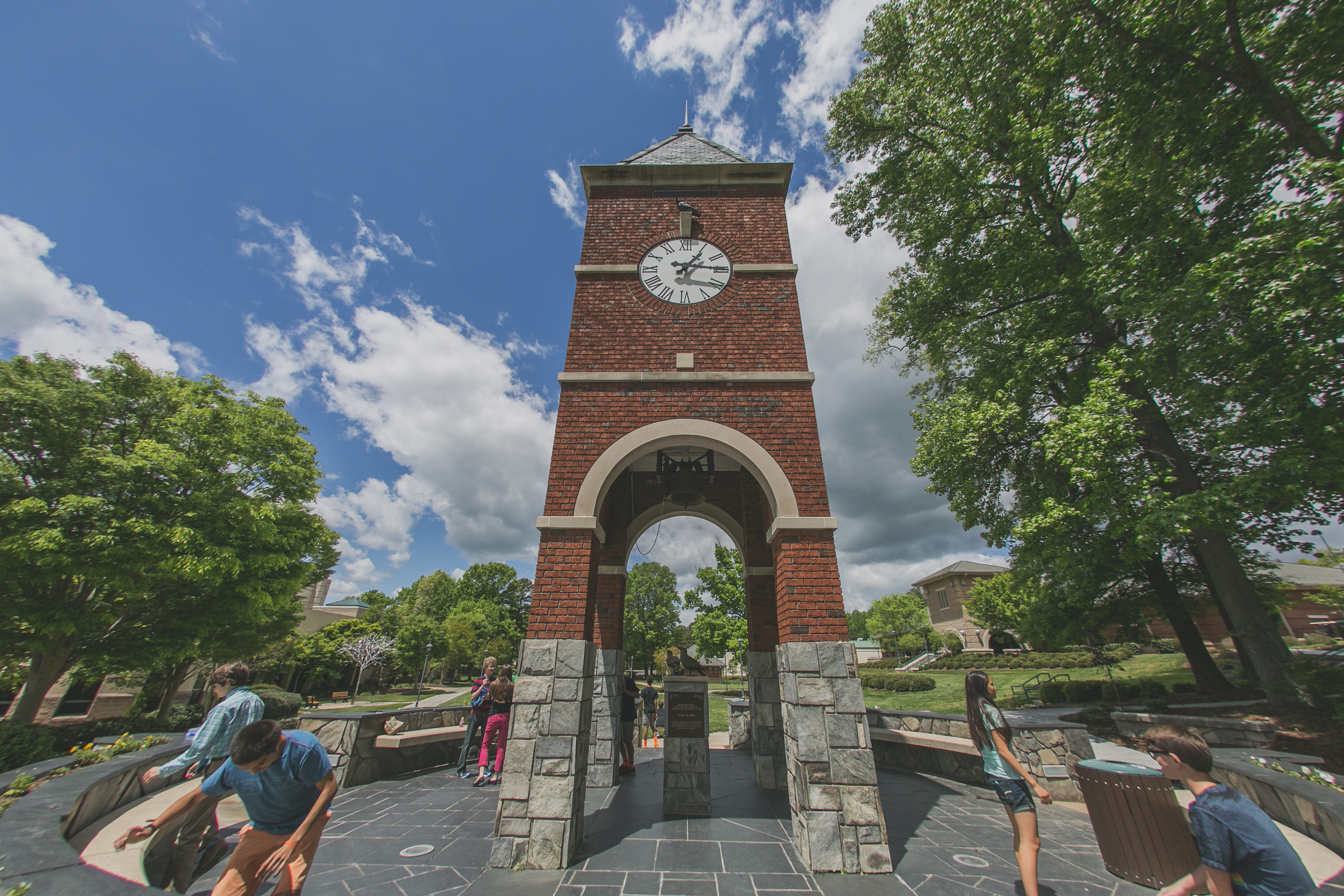
- Murphy Family Bell Tower

Location
- 7409 Falls of Neuse Road; Raleigh, North Carolina 27615; United States; 35°53′3″N 78°37′48″W

Information
- Type: Private, Nonsectarian (formerly Episcopal)
- Founded: 1862 (164 years ago)
- CEEB code: 343233
- NCES School ID: 02049011
- Head of school: Derrick D. Willard
- Teaching staff: 195 (on an FTE basis)
- Grades: K–12
- Enrollment: 1253 (2024-25)
- Student to teacher ratio: 8:6
- Schedule: Starts: 8:00 am Dismissal: 3:15 pm
- Hours in school day: 7 1/4 hrs
- Campus: 136 acres
- Campus type: Suburban
- Colors: Green and Gold
- Athletics conference: North Carolina Independent Schools Athletic Association (NCISAA)
- Mascot: Edgar the Raven
- Nickname: Ravens
- Accreditation: SACS, SAIS
- Yearbook: Corvus
- Affiliations: NAIS, NCAIS, JRPO
- Website: www.ravenscroft.org

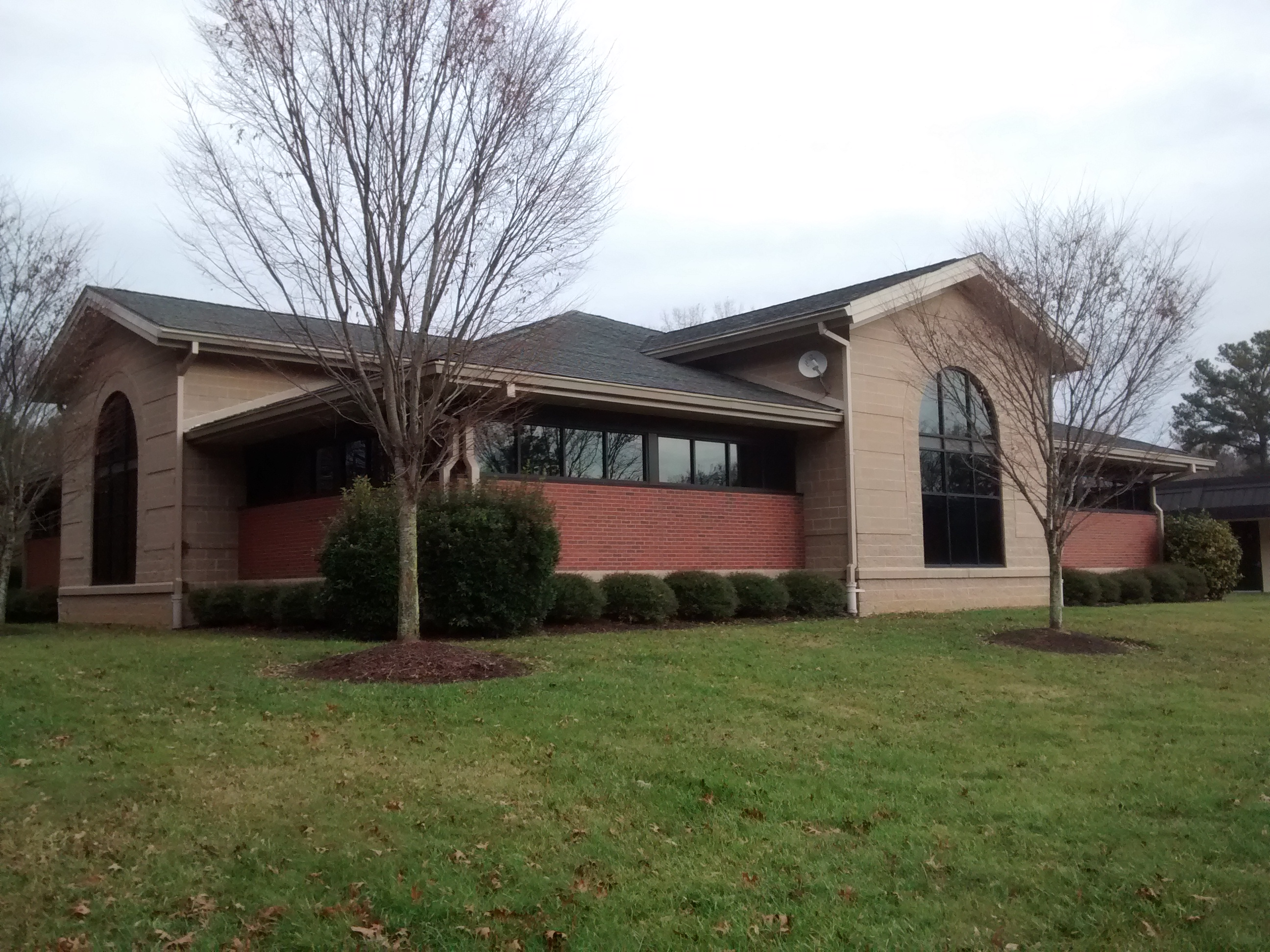
Winston library.

Ravenscroft School is a coed independent private school located in Raleigh, North Carolina. The school enrolls students between Pre-Kindergarten and 12th grade, and serves 1,254 students. The school has three divisions: Lower School, Middle School and Upper School.

== History ==
Ravenscroft is named for John Stark Ravenscroft, the first Episcopal bishop of North Carolina and first rector of Christ Episcopal Church in Raleigh, North Carolina. The idea of a parish school for Christ Episcopal Church was born when Josiah Ogden Watson bequeathed $5,000 to the church to employ a teacher for a new parish school in 1852. His silent bequest became known in 1862, and the church began the process of opening a new school – Ravenscroft School. Founded in 1862, Ravenscroft continued under the auspices of Christ Episcopal Church until 1966 when it became non-sectarian. Housed in locations such as Raleigh's Christ Church, St. Saviour's Chapel and on Tucker Street, Ravenscroft moved to its current location in 1969 with plans to expand to include a high school. At the same time, in 1969, Ravenscroft graduated the last 8th grade class from the Tucker Street. In 1971, the dedication of the Middle School and Upper School took place and, in 1973, Ravenscroft School graduated its first class of seniors.

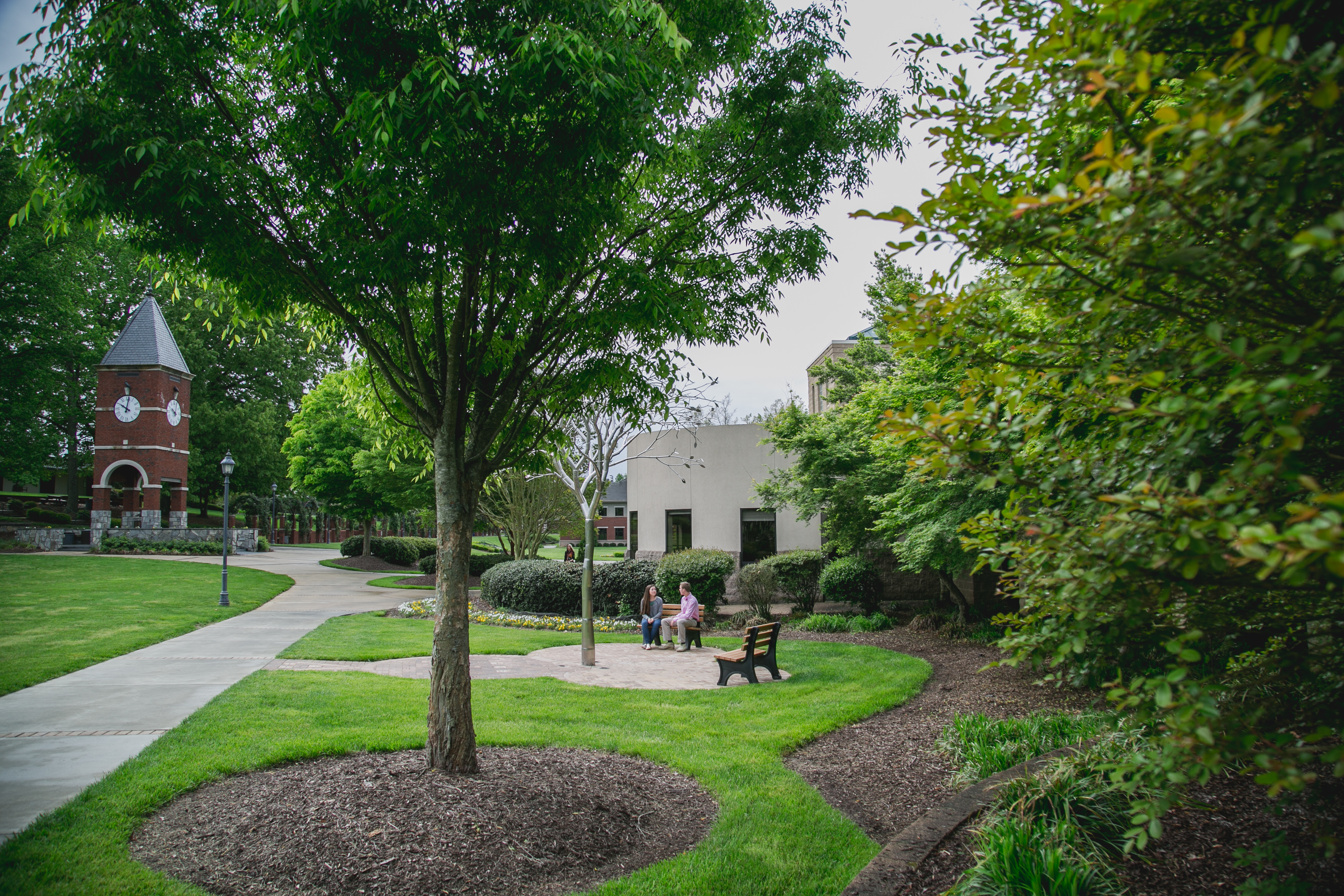
Ravenscroft School, Raleigh, N.C.

== Academics ==
Ravenscroft is an independent, co-educational college preparatory day school enrolling 1,254 students, Pre-K through grade 12. Ravenscroft employs more than 250 faculty and staff.

The elementary school (referred to as the Lower School) has approximately 460 students ranging in grades from Pre-K to 5th grade.

The Middle School at Ravenscroft serves approximately 300 students in grades 6th through 8th. The Middle School operates on an eight-day cycle, during which each course meets six times with a long session.

The high school (referred to as the Upper School) has over 470 students. In the 2019–20 school year, 273 students took 558 Advanced Placement exams. The Upper School operates on an eight-day cycle, during which each course meets 6 times. Each student has a study hall built into their schedule.

== Fine arts ==
Arts education includes Band, Choir, Drama, Strings, Visual Arts, Photography, Lower School Ensembles and Group Violin, as well as private lessons made available to students of all ages. Facilities include the 454-seat Jones Theatre and a 180-seat "black-box" Young People's Theatre, as well as numerous studios and practice rooms.

== Athletics ==
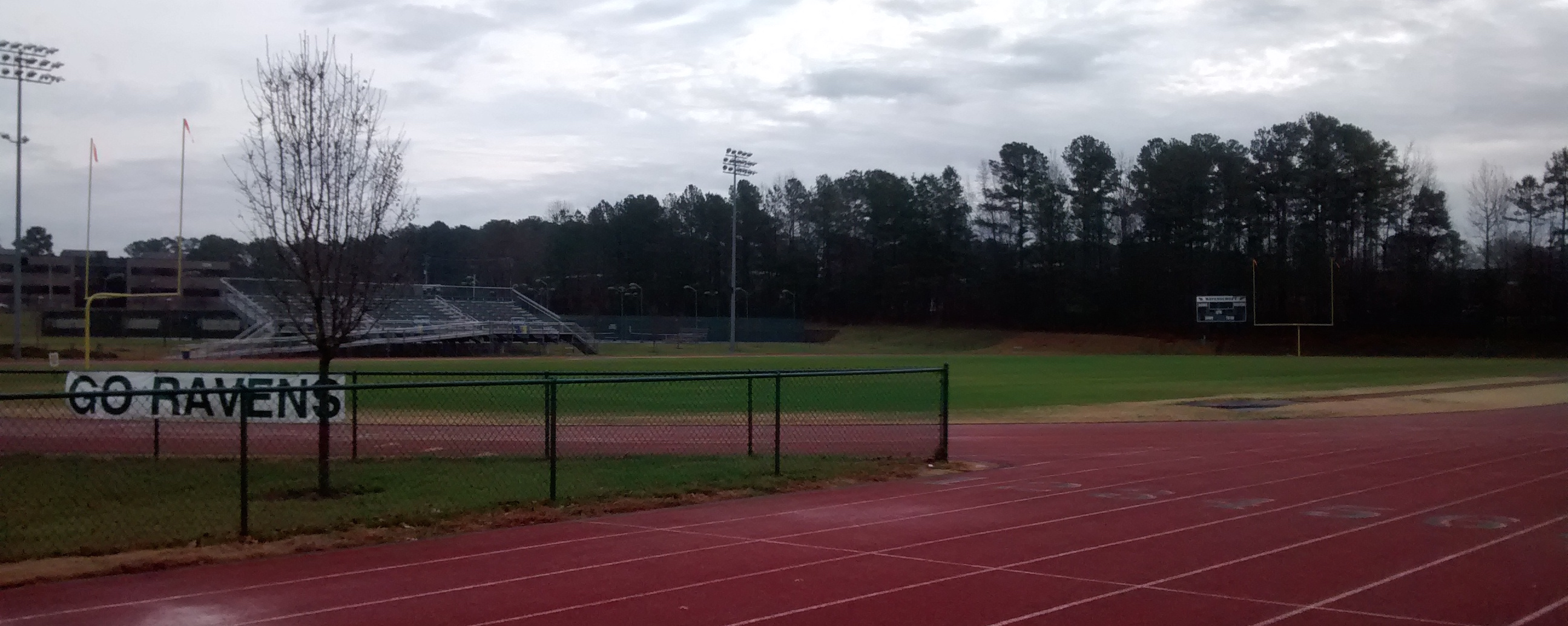
Ravenscroft School football field and track

Ravenscroft's Athletic department offers 25 sports (boys and girls), and fields 53 teams in those sports at the Middle School, junior varsity and varsity levels. More than 80 percent of Ravenscroft students in grades 7–12 participate in school-sponsored athletics. The school mascot is a Raven named Edgar, after Edgar Allan Poe's poem The Raven.

Facilities include: Aquatic Center with 6 lanes and upper deck viewing, 4 gyms, fitness and weight training facility, 3 lighted stadiums, 6 lighted tennis courts, 8-lane rubberized track, and 2 wrestling rooms.

Ravenscroft is a member of the North Carolina Independent Schools Athletic Association (NCISAA) and competes in the 4A division.

NCISAA Championships

2016 NCISAA Girls' Swimming State Champions (4th time in a row)

2016 NCISAA Boys Lacrosse State Champions

2015 NCISAA Football State Champions

2012 NCISAA Boys Basketball State Champions

2013 NCISAA Girls Lacrosse State Champions

== Notable alumni ==
- Andy Andrews, former professional tennis player
- Marcus Bagley, basketball player
- Nathan Baskerville, member of the North Carolina House of Representatives
- English Bernhardt, actress best known for playing Cady Heron in the Mean Girls U.S. National Tour
- Anderson Boyd, filmmaker
- Cameron Castleberry, professional women's soccer player
- Isaac Copeland, professional basketball player
- Ryan Gerard, PGA Tour player
- Anton Gill, professional basketball player
- Nora Grossman, film producer
- Michael C. Hall, actor best known for his roles in Six Feet Under and Dexter
- Antwan Harris, NFL safety who won three Super Bowls with the New England Patriots
- Neal Hunt, Republican member of the North Carolina General Assembly from the 15th district
- Ryan Kelly, NBA player
- Armistead Maupin, author
- Emily Procter, actress best known for her roles in CSI: Miami and The West Wing
- Mishew Edgerton Smith, socialite and lead debutante of the 1953 North Carolina Debutante Ball
- Mitchell Stumpo, baseball player in the Arizona Diamondbacks organization
- Hughes Winborne, Oscar-winning editor of Crash
- Kofie Yeboah, internet personality and video producer for SB Nation, known for his work on the series "Fumble Dimension" with Jon Bois
