= Secrets (disambiguation) =

Secrets are things being hidden.

Secrets may also refer to:

== Films ==
- Secrets (1923 film), a silent film by Frank Borzage
- Secrets (1933 film), starring Mary Pickford
- Secrets (1943 film), a French film directed by Pierre Blanchar
- "Secrets" (CBS Playhouse), a teleplay broadcast in 1968 as part of the CBS Playhouse series
- Secrets (1971 film), starring Jacqueline Bisset
- Secrets (1977 film), TV movie starring Roy Thinnes
- Secrets (1983 film) starring Helen Lindsay
- Secrets (1992 American film), a television film based upon the Danielle Steel novel
- Secrets (1992 Australian film), starring Dannii Minogue and Noah Taylor
- Secrets (1995 film), a period drama TV movie directed by Jud Taylor
- Secrets (2022 film), a Filipino erotic thriller film

== Music ==
- Secrets (post-hardcore band), an American band from San Diego, California
- The Secrets, an American girl group
- Secrets, an American fusion jazz band that preceded Dave Matthews Band

=== Albums ===
- Secrets (Allan Holdsworth album) (1989)
- Secrets (Allison Crowe album) (2004)
- Secrets (Brian Culbertson album)
- Secrets (The Dooleys album) (1981)
- Secrets (Secrets (Gil Scott-Heron and Brian Jackson album) (1978)
- Secrets (Herbie Hancock album) (1976)
- Secrets (The Human League album) (2001)
- Secrets (Mark Feldman album) (2009)
- Secrets (Nicki French album) (1995)
- Secrets (Robert Palmer album) (1979)
- Secrets (Toni Braxton album) (1996)
- Secrets, a Stevie Hoang album (2019)

=== Songs ===
- "Secrets" (Eternal song)
- "Secrets" (Grinspoon song) (2000)
- "Secrets" (Mary Lambert song) (2014)
- "Secrets" (OneRepublic song) (2009)
- "Secrets" (Pink song) (2017)
- "Secrets" (Tears for Fears song) (1996)
- "Secrets" (Tiësto and Kshmr song) (2015)
- "Secrets" (Regard and Raye song) (2020)
- "Secrets" (The Weeknd song), by The Weeknd from Starboy (2016)
- "Secrets", by Anastacia from Freak of Nature (2002)
- "Secrets", by The Cure from Seventeen Seconds (1980)
- "Secrets", by Deep Sea Diver from Secrets
- "Secrets", by Fiat Lux (1984)
- "Secrets", by Golden Earring from Cut (1982)
- "Secrets", by HammerFall from Chapter V: Unbent, Unbowed, Unbroken (2005)
- "Happy Ever After", by Jesper Kyd from the 2018 Indian film Tumbbad
- "Secrets", by Kylie Minogue from Rhythm of Love (1990)
- "Secrets", by Loverboy from Six (1997)
- "Secrets", by The Mekons from The Curse of the Mekons (1991)
- "Secrets", by Mike Oldfield from Tubular Bells III
- "Secrets", by Mission of Burma from Vs. (1982)
- "Secrets", by N-Dubz from Uncle B
- "Secrets", by Nicki French from Secrets (1995)
- "Secrets", by Opshop from You Are Here (2004)
- "Secrets", a song by Shirley Bassey (1965)
- "Secrets", by State Champs from Around the World and Back (2015)
- "Secrets", by Strawberry Switchblade from Strawberry Switchblade (1985)
- "Secrets", by Symphony X from The Damnation Game (1995)
- "Secrets", by Van Halen from Diver Down (1982)
- "Secrets", by will.i.am from Dexter's Laboratory: The Hip-Hop Experiment (2002)
- "Secrets", by The Zutons from Tired of Hanging Around

== Television ==
=== Series and programs ===
- Secrets (Australian TV series), a 1993 adventure series
- Secrets (Irish TV series), a 1990–1993 light entertainment show
- Secrets (Black and Blue), a 1973 British TV play by Michael Palin and Terry Jones
- Judith Krantz's "Secrets", a 1992 miniseries written by Judith Krantz

=== Episodes ===
- "Secrets" (8 Simple Rules), 2004
- "Secrets" (Ben 10), 2006
- "Secrets" (Dark), 2017
- "Secrets" (Domina), 2021
- "Secrets" (The Flumps), 1977
- "Secrets" (NCIS), 2012
- "Secrets" (New Girl), 2012
- "Secrets" (Roseanne), 1992
- "Secrets" (Scott & Bailey), 2012
- "Secrets" (Stargate SG-1), 1998
- "Secrets" (The Walking Dead), 2011

== Other uses ==
- Secrets (1922 play), a play by Rudolf Besier and May Edginton
- Secrets (radio play), a 1925 Australian radio drama
- Secrets (novel), a 2002 novel by Jacqueline Wilson
- Secrets, a 1985 novel by Danielle Steel

== See also ==
- Secret (disambiguation)
- Secrets and Lies (disambiguation)
- Secrets of the Heart (disambiguation)
- Secrecy (disambiguation)
- Little Secrets (disambiguation)
