= The Barretts of Wimpole Street (1934 film) =

1934 American historical romantic drama film directed by Sidney Franklin

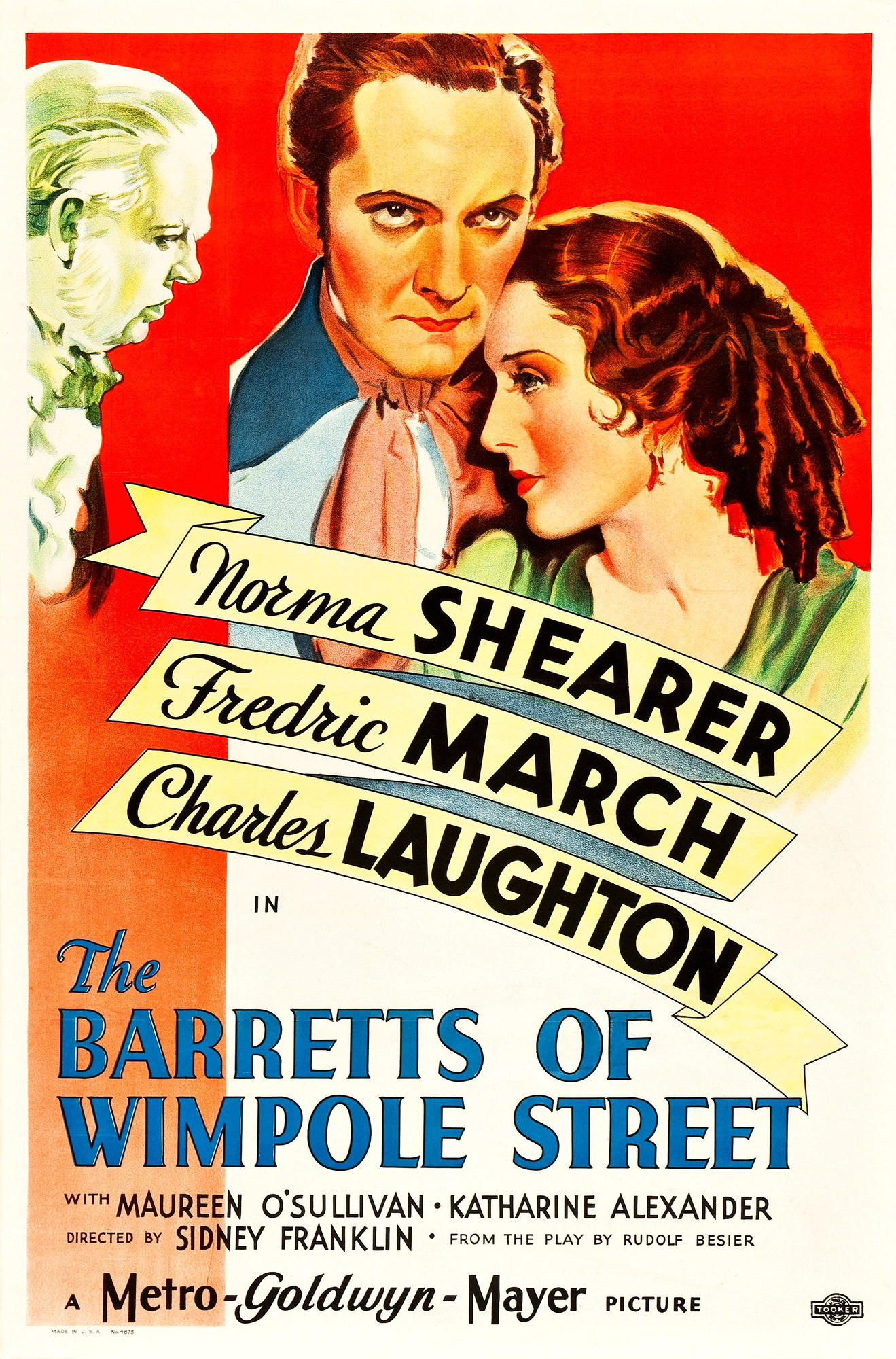
- Theatrical release poster
- Directed by: Sidney Franklin
- Screenplay by: Donald Ogden Stewart; Ernest Vajda; Claudine West
- Based on: The Barretts of Wimpole Street; 1930 play by Rudolf Besier
- Produced by: Irving Thalberg
- Starring: Norma Shearer; Fredric March; Charles Laughton
- Cinematography: William H. Daniels
- Edited by: Margaret Booth
- Music by: Herbert Stothart
- Production company: Metro-Goldwyn-Mayer
- Distributed by: Loew's Inc.
- Release date: September 14, 1934
- Running time: 110 minutes
- Country: United States
- Language: English
- Budget: $820,000
- Box office: $1,258,000 (Domestic earnings) $1,085,000 (Foreign earnings)

The Barretts of Wimpole Street is a 1934 American historical romantic drama film directed by Sidney Franklin based on the 1930 play of the same title by Rudolf Besier. It depicts the real-life romance between poets Elizabeth Barrett (Norma Shearer) and Robert Browning (Fredric March), despite the opposition of her abusive father Edward Moulton-Barrett (Charles Laughton). The film was nominated for the Academy Award for Best Picture and Shearer was nominated for the Academy Award for Best Actress. It was written by Ernest Vajda, Claudine West, and Donald Ogden Stewart, from the successful 1930 play The Barretts of Wimpole Street by Rudolf Besier, and starring Katharine Cornell.

In 1957, Franklin directed a color remake in CinemaScope and Metrocolor starring Jennifer Jones, John Gielgud, and Bill Travers.

== Plot ==
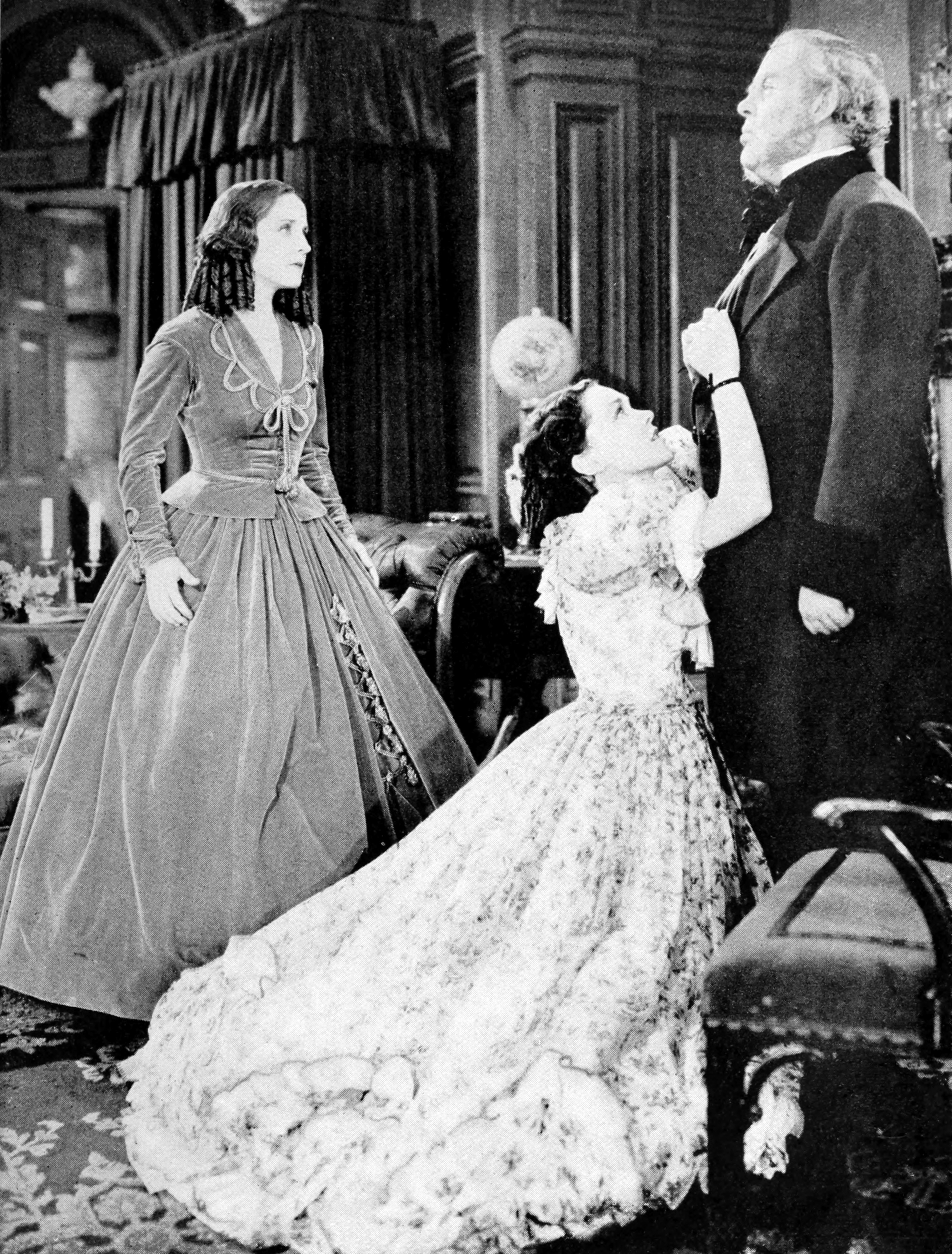
Norma Shearer, Maureen O'Sullivan, and Charles Laughton in The Barretts of Wimpole Street

In her bedroom where she has been sequestered for years, Elizabeth ("Ba"), the eldest Barrett daughter, consults with her doctor. She is recovering from an illness and is weak, but the doctor advises that a full recovery is possible.

She has a vivacious and brilliant mind, her poetry is frequently published, and she loves joking with her siblings, especially her youngest sister, Henrietta. Her stern father Edward, however, wastes no opportunity to remind Elizabeth that she is near death. Henrietta is interested in marrying her brothers' friend Surtees, but she cannot see any way around her possessive father, who has forbidden his children to marry.

Robert Browning, who has been corresponding with Elizabeth for some time, arrives in person and sweeps her off her feet. Months pass, and with a new lease on life, Elizabeth is able to walk. Edward insists she is still very sick, and when the doctors prescribe a trip to Italy, Edward forbids it. Exasperated, Robert makes his feelings towards Edward plain to Elizabeth, and they declare their love for each other.

One day, the Barretts' cousin Bella reveals that Elizabeth's relationship with Robert is romantic. Edward arranges a scheme to get Elizabeth away from Robert by selling the house and moving the family to Surrey, six miles from the nearest railway station.

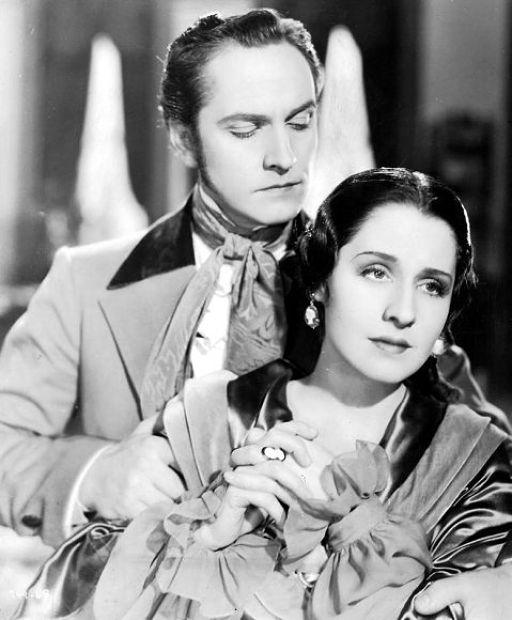
Film still with Norma Shearer and Fredric March.

Unexpectedly, Edward returns from London and catches Henrietta and Surtees modeling his dress uniform for Elizabeth. He forces Henrietta to confess her secret romance. Denouncing her as a whore, he makes her swear never to see Surtees again and lock herself in her room.

Ba conspires with her maid Wilson to let Robert know she will elope with him, accompanied by Wilson. Edward confesses to Ba the motivation for his behavior: he thinks of himself as having a sex addiction and now suppresses his desires, equating sex with sin, and he wants his children never to fall prey to carnal passion. As he goes into detail about how he wants Ba all to himself, he embraces her and comes close to making a sexual advance. Horrified, Ba repulses him. He apologizes and leaves, saying he will pray for her. Ba soon departs with her dog Flush. The film closes with a brief scene of Elizabeth's and Robert's marriage, with Wilson as a witness and Flush waiting patiently by the church door.

== Cast ==
- Norma Shearer as Elizabeth Barrett
- Fredric March as Robert Browning
- Charles Laughton as Edward Moulton-Barrett
- Maureen O'Sullivan as Henrietta Barrett
- Katharine Alexander as Arabel Barrett
- Ralph Forbes as Captain Surtees Cook
- Marion Clayton as Bella Hedley
- Ian Wolfe as Harry Bevan
- Ferdinand Munier as Dr Chambers
- Una O'Connor as Wilson
- Leo G. Carroll as Dr Ford-Waterlow
- Vernon Downing as Octavius Barrett
- Neville Clark as Charles Barrett
- Matthew Smith as George Barrett
- Robert Carlton as Alfred Barrett
- Allan Conrad as Henry Barrett
- Peter Hobbes as Septimus Barrett

== Depiction of events ==
The numerous love letters that Robert and Elizabeth exchanged before their marriage give readers a great deal of information about this famous courtship in their own words. The correspondence was well underway before they ever met in person, he having admired the collection Poems that she published in 1844. He opens his first letter to her, "I love your verses with all my heart, dear Miss Barrett", and a little later in that first letter he says "I do, as I say, love these books with all my heart—and I love you too" (January 10, 1845). Several editions of these letters have been published, the first being one compiled by their son in 1898. Flush: A Biography, the version by Virginia Woolf, from the perspective of Elizabeth's dog, is also an imaginative reconstruction, though more closely based on reading the letters.

Both the play and film reflect popular concerns at the time, particularly Freudian analysis. Although Edward Barrett's behavior in disinheriting any of the children who married seems bizarre, there appears to be no evidence of his being sexually aggressive toward any of the family members.

For the screenplay, all overt suggestions of incest were removed from Besier's original play, but Charles Laughton, who played Edward, assured producer Irving Thalberg, "They can't censor the gleam in my eye."

== Reception ==
Andre Sennwald of The New York Times called the film "a drama of beauty, dignity and nobility", praising Shearer's performance as "a brave and touching piece of acting" and Laughton as "superb." Variety called it "truly an actor's picture" with a "final stretch that grips and holds", but that overall it was "slow" and "talky" and suggested its running time could have been shortened. Film Daily lauded it as "Unquestionably one of the greatest love stories ever filmed", with "a superb performance" by Shearer and one of Laughton's "most dominating performances." "I found myself pleasantly surprised by the performances of Miss Shearer and Mr. March", wrote St. Clair McKelway for The New Yorker. Although McKelway found it "hard to accept Miss Shearer in her role", he called it "sensibly handled from beginning to end, and every now and then Mr. Laughton creates moments as effective, I think, as any you have seen on the screen." The Barretts of Wimpole Street topped the Film Daily year-end poll of 424 critics as the best film of 1934.

The film was considered a success at the box office. According to MGM records it earned theater rentals of $1,258,000 in the US and Canada and $1,085,000 elsewhere, resulting in a profit of $668,000. Its unexpected success in rural U.S. markets, despite its upper-class themes, was mentioned in the 1935 Variety article famously headlined "Sticks Nix Hick Pix".

== Adaptations ==
In 1957, Sidney Franklin filmed a word-for-word, and nearly shot-for-shot Metrocolor remake, of The Barretts of Wimpole Street, in CinemaScope. This version starred Jennifer Jones as Elizabeth, John Gielgud as her father, Bill Travers as Robert Browning, and Keith Baxter in his film debut.

Both of the films were released by MGM.

It was also adapted in the Hindi language as the Indian film Aaj Aur Kal (1963).
