= Secret (disambiguation) =

A secret is information kept hidden.

Secret or The Secret may also refer to:

== Arts, entertainment, and media ==
=== Comics and manga ===
- Secret, the 2012–2014 comic series by Jonathan Hickman and Ryan Bodenheim
- Secret, the 2013 manga series sequel to the Doubt series, by Yoshiki Tonogai
- The Secret (Dark Horse Comics), a 2007 limited series comic book

=== Fictional entities ===
- Secret (Greta Hayes), a fictional superhero
- The Secret, the MacGuffin in the 2007 The Secret Series by Pseudonymous Bosch

=== Films ===
- A Secret, a 2007 French drama by Claude Miller
- Secret (2007 film), a Taiwanese romance by Jay Chou
- Secret (2009 film), a South Korean thriller by Yoon Jae-goo
- Secret (2024 film), an Indian Malayalam-language film
- Secrets (1933 film), an American film directed by Frank Borzage
- Secrets (1992 American film), an American made-for-television drama directed by Peter H. Hunt
- Secrets (1992 Australian film)
- The Secret (1955 film), a British film by Cy Endfield
- The Secret (1974 film), a French thriller by Robert Enrico
- The Secret (1979 film), a Hong Kong film by Ann Hui
- The Secret, a 1988 Venezuelan film by Luis Armando Roche
- The Secret (1990 film), an Italian film by Francesco Maselli
- The Secret (1992 film), an American made-for-TV film by Karen Arthur
- The Secret (2000 film), a French film by Virginie Wagon
- The Secret (2006 film), an inspirational film by Drew Heriot
- The Secret (2007 film), a French thriller by Vincent Perez
- Dead Time: Kala, also known as The Secret, a 2007 Indonesian neo-noir thriller by Joko Anwar
- The Secret Disco Revolution, a 2012 Canadian documentary about disco music
- The Secret (2016 film), a Chinese film by Wong Chun-chun
- The Secret: Dare to Dream (2020 film), an American film directed by Andy Tennant

=== Literature ===
- "The Secret", an 1833 juvenile story by Charlotte Brontë
- The Secret, a 1950 novel by Mary Roberts Rinehart
- "The Secret" (short story), a 1963 short story by Arthur C. Clarke
- The Secret (treasure hunt), a 1982 treasure hunt and puzzle book by Byron Preiss
- The Secret (novel), a 1997 book in the Animorphs series
- The Secret: A Novel, a 2002 novel by Eva Hoffman
- The Secret (Byrne book), a 2006 self-help book by Rhonda Byrne
- The Secret, a 2016 novel by Kathryn Hughes
- The Secret, a 2023 novel by Lee Child

=== Music ===
==== Classical music ====
- The Secret (opera) (Tajemství), by Bedřich Smetana

==== Groups ====
- Secret (Russian band), a rock band
- Secret (South Korean band), a girl group

==== Albums and EPs ====
===== Secret =====
- Secret (Ayumi Hamasaki album), 2006
- Secret (Classix Nouveaux album), 1983
- Secret (Kumi Koda album), 2005
- Secret (soundtrack), from the 2007 Taiwanese film
- Secret (EP), by Sebadoh, 2012
- Secret, by Anna Maria Jopek, 2005

===== Le Secret =====
- Le Secret (album), by Lara Fabian, 2013
- Le Secret (EP), by Alcest, 2005

===== The Secret =====
- The Secret (Alan Parsons album), 2019
- The Secret (Marie Picasso album), 2007
- The Secret (Austin Mahone EP), 2014
- The Secret (Vib Gyor EP), 2007
- The Secret (Cosmic Girls EP), 2016
- The Secret, an EP by the Airborne Toxic Event

==== Songs ====
===== "Secret" =====
- "Secret" (Heart song), 1990
- "Secret" (Madonna song), 1994
- "Secret" (Maki Goto song), 2007
- "Secret" (Orchestral Manoeuvres in the Dark song), 1985
- "Secret (Take You Home)", by Kylie Minogue, 2004
- "Secret", by Johnny Rebb, 1963
- "Secret", by 21 Savage, 2020
- "Secret", by Maroon 5 from Songs About Jane, 2002
- "Secret", by Missy Higgins from On a Clear Night, 2007
- "Secret", by The Pierces from Thirteen Tales of Love and Revenge, 2007
- "Secret", by Raveena from Asha's Awakening, 2022
- "Secret", by Spratleys Japs, 1999
- "Secret", by Way Out West from Intensify, 2001
- "Secret", by Zara Larsson from 1, 2014
- "Secret (Shh)", by Charli XCX from Vroom Vroom, 2016
- "Secret", by Audio Adrenaline from Bloom, 1996
- "Secrets" (The Weeknd song), 2016

===== "The Secret" =====
- "The Secret", by Gene McDaniels, the B-side of "Tower of Strength", 1961
- "The Secret", by Gino, 1963
- "The Secret", by Gordon MacRae, 1958

=== Television ===
==== Series ====
- Secret (2000 TV series), a South Korean drama
- Secret (2011 TV series), a South Korean game-talk show
- Secret (2013 TV series), a South Korean drama
- The Secret (TV series), a 2016 British drama
- Sangue Oculto, a 2022 Portuguese telenovela also titled The Secret

==== Episodes ====
- "Secrets" (Ben 10)
- "The Secret" (Code Lyoko)
- "The Secret" (Dynasty 1984)
- "The Secret" (Dynasty 1986)
- "The Secret" (Highway to Heaven 1985)
- "The Secret" (The Amazing World of Gumball)
- "The Secret" (The O.C.)
- "The Secret" (The Office)

== Brands and enterprises ==
- Secret (app), from 2014–2015, an app for anonymous message sharing with friends
- Secret (chocolate bar), introduced in the 1980s, a chocolate bar manufactured by Nestlé
- Secret (deodorant brand), introduced in 1956, a brand of deodorant by Procter & Gamble

== Other uses ==
- Secret (helmet), a type of skullcap
- Secret (liturgy), a type of prayer
- Secret and Top Secret, levels of classified information
- Pendulum-and-hydrostat control, a closely-guarded method of torpedo guidance nicknamed "The Secret"
- USS Secret (SP-1063), a US Navy patrol boat in commission from 1917 to 1918
- Shared secret, in cryptography

== See also ==
- Little Secrets (disambiguation)
- Secrecy (disambiguation)
- Secrets (disambiguation)
