= The Barretts of Wimpole Street (1957 film) =

1957 historical romantic drama film by Sidney Franklin

- Directed by: Sidney Franklin
- Written by: John Dighton (screenplay)
- Based on: The Barretts of Wimpole Street; 1930 play by Rudolf Besier
- Produced by: Sam Zimbalist
- Starring: John Gielgud; Jennifer Jones; Bill Travers; Virginia McKenna
- Cinematography: Freddie Young
- Edited by: Frank Clarke
- Music by: Bronisław Kaper
- Color process: Metrocolor
- Production company: Metro-Goldwyn-Mayer
- Distributed by: Metro-Goldwyn-Mayer
- Release date: 17 January 1957 (Radio City Music Hall)
- Running time: 105 minutes
- Country: United Kingdom
- Language: English
- Budget: $2.2 million
- Box office: $1.1 million

The Barretts of Wimpole Street is a 1957 British CinemaScope historical romantic drama film originating from the United Kingdom; it was a re-make of the earlier 1934 version by the same director, Sidney Franklin. Both films are based on the 1930 play The Barretts of Wimpole Street by Rudolf Besier. The screenplay for the 1957 film is credited to John Dighton, but Franklin used exactly the same script for the second movie as he did for the first. The film, set in the early 19th century, stars Jennifer Jones, John Gielgud, and Bill Travers.

== Plot ==
Elizabeth Barrett is the disabled, adult daughter of Edward Moulton-Barrett of Wimpole Street, and she has an intense interest in poetry. However, she lives under the obsessive rule of her father, and his domination severely limits her ability to develop her poetry. Edward in fact shows clear incestuous tendencies toward her and discourages close contact with any males. When the poet Robert Browning enters her life, matters are brought to a head through the intervention of Browning. Edward finds that his control over Elizabeth, and her younger sister Henrietta, is far from complete.

== Cast ==
- John Gielgud as Edward Moulton-Barrett
- Jennifer Jones as Elizabeth Barrett
- Bill Travers as Robert Browning
- Virginia McKenna as Henrietta Barrett
- Vernon Gray as Captain Surtees Cook
- Susan Stephen as Bella
- Jean Anderson as Wilson
- Maxine Audley as Arabel
- Leslie Phillips as Harry Bevan
- Laurence Naismith as Dr. Chambers
- Moultrie Kelsall as Dr. Ford-Waterlow
- Michael Brill as George
- Kenneth Fortescue as Octavius
- Nicholas Hawtrey as Henry
- Richard Thorp as Alfred
- Keith Baxter as Charles
- Brian Smith as Septimus

== Production ==
=== Development ===
To lend the whole project an air of authenticity, producer Sam Zimbalist moved filming from the 1934 location in the United States to the Metro-Goldwyn-Mayer studios in Borehamwood, Hertfordshire.

=== Casting ===
Zimbalist wanted only "fine English actors" with the exception of American actress Jennifer Jones. The cast included Bill Travers (Browning) and Virginia McKenna (Henrietta), who were husband and wife in real life.

=== Filming ===
The production wanted to use as many correct locations as possible, including St Marylebone Parish Church in London.

The film was shot in Metrocolor, using CinemaScope, with an aspect ratio of 2.35:1 on 35mm film. The 4-track stereo sound was supplied by Westrex.

== Release ==
The film was an expensive financial failure. According to MGM records, it earned $330,000 in the U.S. and Canada, and $725,000 in other countries, resulting in a loss of $1,897,000.

== Reception ==
Reviews were generally positive, but several critics questioned the decision to remake the film at that time because of its lack of appeal to the rock and roll generation. Bosley Crowther of The New York Times praised the film as "another fine production of the old romance...It does one's heart good to visit once more that dramatic old house on Wimpole Street."

Variety wrote that the film had "a quality look, perfectly picturing the era with almost museum fidelity and reflecting astuteness in virtually all phases except possibly the most important—choice of story for the current, highly competitive market." The review thought that younger viewers would find the film "no more than a quaint, old-fashioned, boy-meets-girl drama, long, talky and often tedious."

Harrison's Reports agreed, calling the film "a quality production" but "extremely slow-moving, and the morals and manners of the period, as presented, may prove much too stately for today's mass audiences." Richard L. Coe of The Washington Post declared the film "an excellent remake of an old favorite" with a "chilling, memorable performance" by Gielgud.

A generally positive review in The New Yorker by John McCarten called the script a "fair and literate adaptation" of the play and Mr. Barrett "an impressive figure" as played by Gielgud, "but I'm afraid I can't say as much for Jennifer Jones, who plays the invalid Elizabeth as if she'd just completed a lively hay ride, or for Bill Travers, whose Browning is unconscionably ebullient." The Monthly Film Bulletin remarked that the decision to remake the film seemed "rather odd," given that to modern viewers it "must appear a little tame and lacking in spirit. In any case, the handling of Rudolf Besier's heavily dramatic play reveals little flair or imagination; the film is far too static and theatrically manoeuvered to maintain the interest throughout its considerable running time."

== Historicity ==
Although most of the names of the individuals involved are correct in the play and films, by definition motivations of individuals cannot be known. The numerous love letters that Robert and Elizabeth exchanged before their marriage can give readers a great deal of information about this famous courtship in their own words. The correspondence was well underway before they met in person, he having admired the collection Poems that she published in 1844. He opens his first letter to her with "I love your verses with all my heart, dear Miss Barrett", and a later in that first letter he writes "I do, as I say, love these books with all my heart—and I love you too" (10 January 1845).

Several editions of these letters have been published, starting with one by their son in 1898. Flush by Virginia Woolf, a version of the courtship from the perspective of Elizabeth's dog, is also an imaginative reconstruction, but more closely based on reading the letters. Both the play and film reflect popular concerns at the time, particularly Freudian analysis. Although Edward Barrett's behaviour in disinheriting the children who married seems bizarre, there is no evidence of his being sexually aggressive toward any family members.

== See also ==
- List of British films of 1957
