= Secrets (radio play) =

Secrets is a 1925 Australian radio drama. It is an adaptation of the 1922 play of the same name by Rudolf Besier and May Edginton. The play was being performed in Australia by Frank Harvey and Muriel Starr for JC Williamsons Ltd when Williamsons agreed to broadcast it on radio. This was considered a major coup at the time because it was the first time top rank actors appeared in an Australian production of a radio play. The show aired on 17 July 1925.

The stage production was directed by George D. Parker. Response had been very positive.

Frank Harvey went on to become a significant actor and director in Australian radio.
