= Three Hours =

1927 film by James Flood

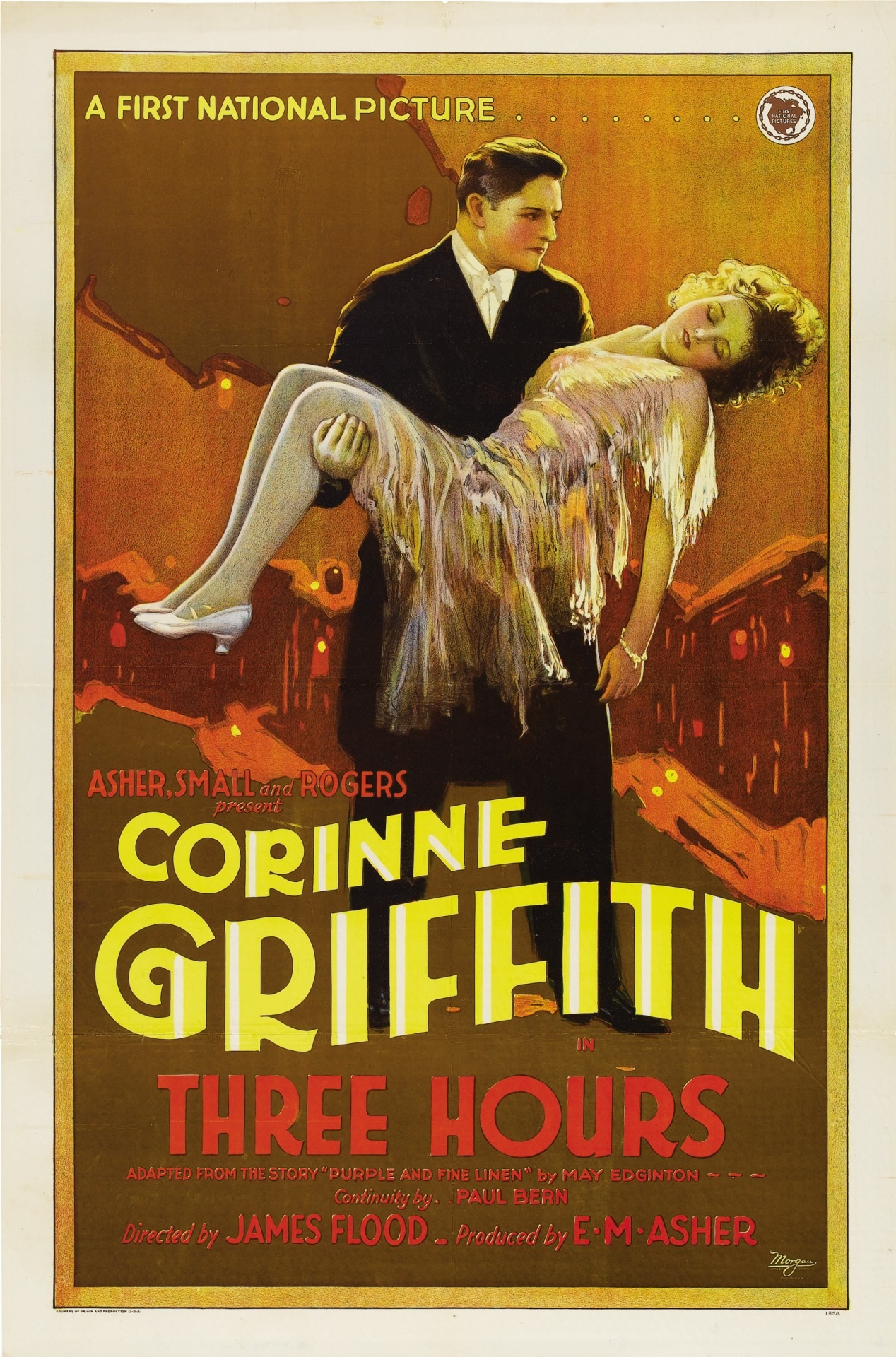
- Film poster
- Directed by: James Flood
- Written by: Paul Bern
- Based on: "Purple and Fine Linen" by May Edginton
- Produced by: E.M. Asher; Corinne Griffith
- Starring: Corinne Griffith; John Bowers; Hobart Bosworth
- Cinematography: Harry Jackson
- Distributed by: First National Pictures
- Release date: March 5, 1927
- Running time: 1 hour
- Country: United States
- Language: Silent (English intertitles)

Three Hours is a 1927 American silent drama film based on the 1926 story "Purple and Fine Linen" by May Edginton. It was directed by James Flood and stars Corinne Griffith, who also served as executive producer. Filmed in Los Angeles, the story is set in San Francisco. Nine years later, Edginton's story also provided the inspiration for the film Adventure in Manhattan.

== Plot ==
The plot concerns a woman, Madeline Durkin, who has lost all her wealth as well as her young daughter. Taking advantage of a stranger's kindness, she is apprehended for theft but asks for three hours leave to see her dying child.

== Cast ==
- Corinne Griffith as Madeline Durkin
- John Bowers as James Finlay
- Hobart Bosworth as Jonathan Durkin
- Paul Ellis as Gilbert Wainwright
- Anne Schaefer as Governess
- Mary Louise Miller as Baby Durkin

== Preservation ==
A print of Three Hours survives at the George Eastman Museum in Rochester, New York.
