= Le Secret =

Le Secret (literally "The secret" in French) may refer to:

- Le Secret (film) or The Secret, a 1974 film
- Le Secret (album), a 2013 album by Lara Fabian
- Le Secret (EP), a 2005 EP by French musician Alcest

== See also ==
- Secret (disambiguation)
