= The Barretts of Wimpole Street =

1930 play written by Rudolf Besier

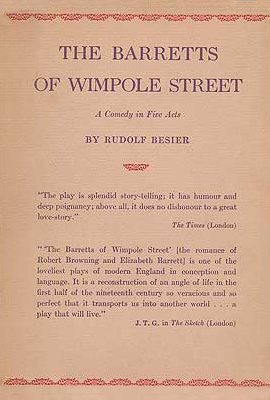
- First US edition 1930s
- Written by: Rudolf Besier
- Setting: Elizabeth Barrett's bed-sitting-room at 50 Wimpole Street, London, in 1845

Premiere
- Date: 20 August 1930
- Place: Malvern Festival, Malvern, Worcestershire

The Barretts of Wimpole Street is a 1930 play by the Dutch/English dramatist Rudolf Besier, based on the romance between Robert Browning and Elizabeth Barrett, and her domineering father's unwillingness to allow them to marry. Presented first at the Malvern Festival in August 1930, the play transferred to the West End, where it ran for 528 performances. An American production, produced by and starring Katharine Cornell, opened in 1931 and ran on Broadway for 370 performances. The play has subsequently been revived onstage and adapted for television and the cinema.

The play caused some protests from the descendants of one of the central characters, Edward Moulton-Barrett, objecting to what they saw as his depiction as a depraved monster, although the author and original director denied that the play did so.

== Production ==
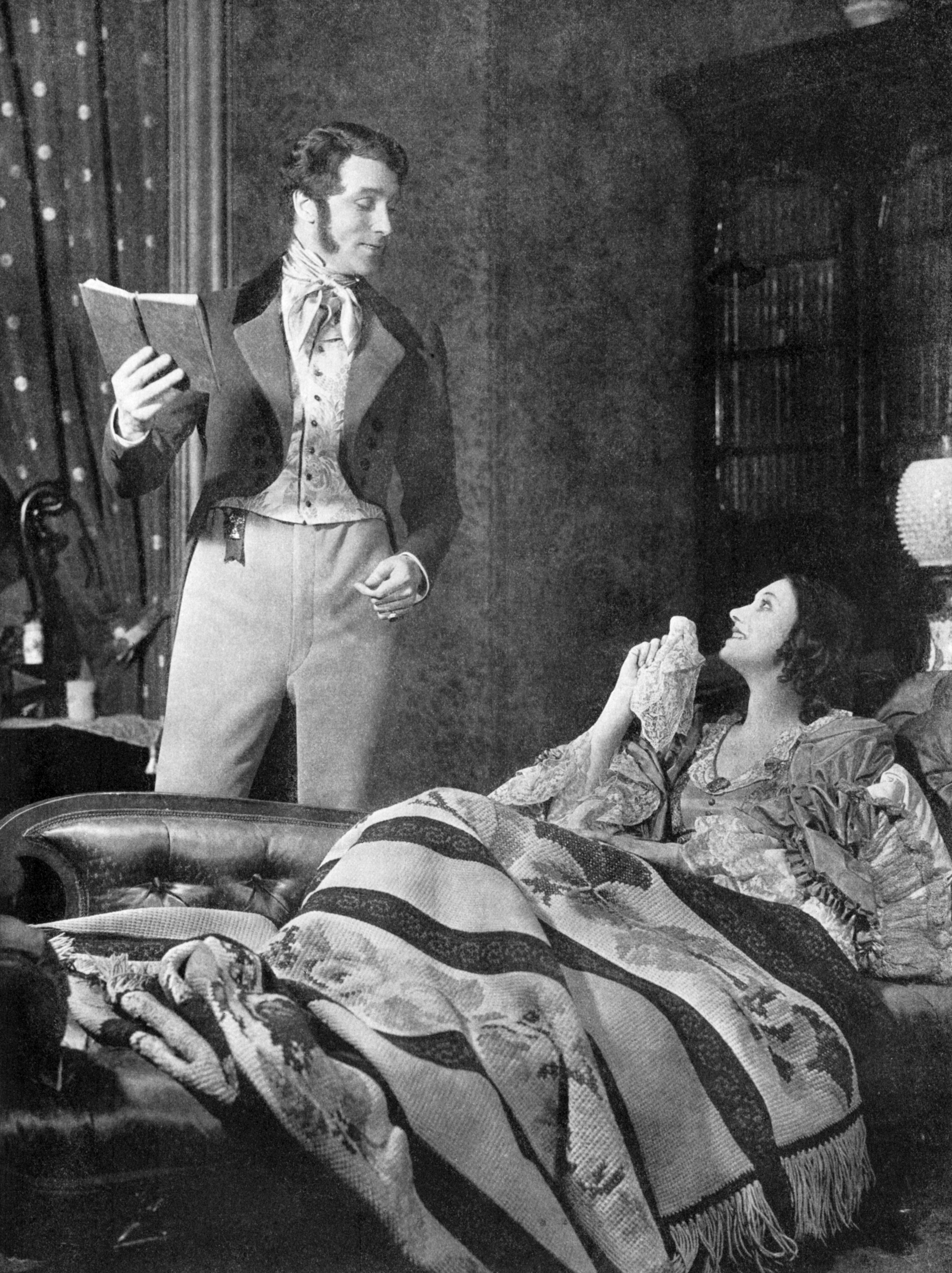
Brian Aherne and Katharine Cornell in the original Broadway production of The Barretts of Wimpole Street (1931)

The Barretts of Wimpole Street was Rudolf Besier's only success as a playwright. It was first staged on 20 August 1930 at the Malvern Festival in Malvern, Worcestershire. Elizabeth Barrett lived near Malvern as a child, which suggested to the director, Sir Barry Jackson, the appropriateness of opening the play there before presenting it in the West End. The production starred Gwen Ffrangcon-Davies as Elizabeth Moulton-Barrett and Scott Sunderland as Robert Browning. The production was later seen in Birmingham before opening, with the original cast unchanged, at the Queen's Theatre in London on 23 September 1930, where it ran until 2 January 1932, a total of 528 performances.

The production provoked protests from some of Edward Moulton-Barrett's grandchildren about the portrayal of their grandfather as a monster with "unspeakable vices". Besier and Jackson issued a statement that neither when writing the play nor in its production was there any intention to portray Barrett as a man with incestuous impulses, and that such interpretation of the play was erroneous and unfounded. The text of the play was published by Victor Gollancz in 1931. It is dedicated to Hugh Walpole.

In search of an American production, Besier was rebuffed by 27 producers, then the actress Katharine Cornell took an interest in the play and had it staged at the Hanna Theatre in Cleveland, Ohio on 29 January 1931. The play then went to Broadway, where it opened on 9 February, at the Empire Theatre, starring Cornell and Brian Aherne, running for 370 performances. The Stage wrote in 1974 that Elizabeth was Cornell's most famous part.

=== Stage casts ===
Role	Original production (1930)	US production (1931)
Doctor Chambers	Aubrey Mallalieu	George Riddell
Elizabeth Moulton-Barrett	Gwen Ffrangcon-Davies	Katharine Cornell
Wilson	Eileen Beldon	Brenda Forbes
Henrietta Moulton-Barrett	Marjorie Mars	Margaret Barker
Arabel Moulton-Barrett	Susan Richmond	Joyce Carey
Octavius Moulton-Barrett	Barry K. Barnes	John Halloran
Septimus Moulton-Barrett	B. B. Coleman	William Whitehead
Alfred Moulton-Barrett	Hugh Moxey	Vernon Downing
Charles Moulton-Barrett	Leonard Bennett	Frederick Voight
Henry Moulton-Barrett	Douglas Quayle	Basil Harvey
George Moulton-Barrett	Anthony Marshall	Leslie Denison
Edward Moulton-Barrett	Cedric Hardwicke	Charles Waldron
Bella Hedley	Joan Barry	Dorothy Mathews
Henry Bevan	Oliver Johnston	John D. Seymour
Robert Browning	Scott Sunderland	Brian Aherne
Doctor Ford-Waterlow	Wilfred Caithness	Oswald Marshall
Captain Surtees Cook	Barry Wilcoxon	John Buckler
Flush (Elizabeth's dog)	Tuppenny of Ware	Flush

Source: Playscript.

== Plot ==
The action of the play takes place in Elizabeth Barrett's bed-sitting room in her father's house. She is an invalid, taking comfort from her pet spaniel, Flush. Her sister Henrietta tells her that their father is in a fury because of the impending visit of their cousin Bella, who is about to marry – something Barrett will not allow his daughters to do: "So long as Papa's alive none of us will ever be able to marry with his consent – and to marry without it is unthinkable". To Moulton-Barrett, love entails "cruelty and loathing and degradation and remorse ... With the help of God, and through years of tormenting abstinence, I strangled it in myself. And so long as I have breath in my body, I'll keep it away from those I was given to protect and care for".

When Bella arrives, Elizabeth confesses that she too has an admirer – the handsome young poet Robert Browning. Invigorated by his renewed declaration of love, she gets up and walks for the first time in years.

Some months later, Elizabeth is so much better that she is planning a trip to Italy, on her doctor's advice. Her father cannot bear to let her go. When Browning begs her to marry him and leave for Italy together, Elizabeth pleads for time. When Barrett discovers that Henrietta has an admirer, he is so angry that he assaults her and makes her swear never to see him again. Elizabeth, realising that she must act, secretly marries Browning and elopes with him, leaving a note for her father. Barrett, devastated, wants revenge. "A smile of indescribable ugliness flickers across his face" and he orders Elizabeth's beloved dog to be destroyed – but she has taken Flush with her. Learning from Henrietta that his cruel vengeance has been thwarted, Barrett stands perfectly still, "staring straight before him and mechanically tearing Elizabeth's letter into little pieces, which drop to his feet".

== Revivals and adaptations ==
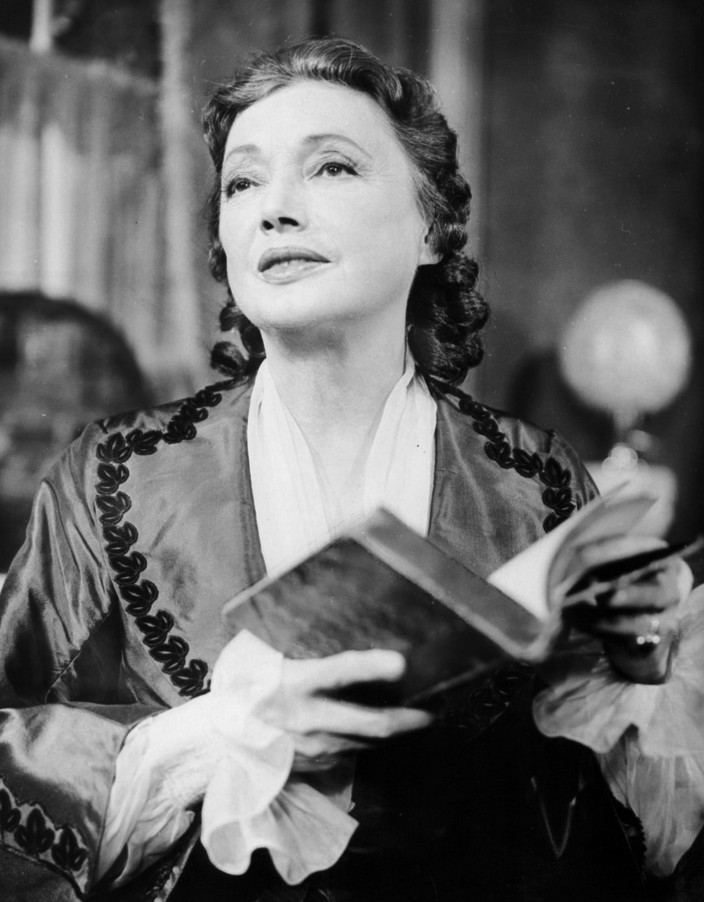
Cornell reprising her role in the Producers' Showcase television production of the play in 1956

=== Revivals ===
Cornell revived the play twice on Broadway: at the Martin Beck Theatre (1935) and the Ethel Barrymore Theatre (1945). There was a West End revival of the play in 1948 at the Garrick Theatre, starring Margaret Johnston, Alec Clunes and Tom Walls.

=== Film ===
It was filmed in 1934, starring Fredric March, Norma Shearer and Charles Laughton. That film was remade scene-for-scene and almost shot-for-shot, in colour, in 1957, starring Bill Travers, Jennifer Jones and John Gielgud. Both films were directed by Sidney Franklin.

=== Television ===
BBC television broadcast an adaptation of the play on 14 October 1951, starring Pauline Jameson as Elizabeth, Griffith Jones as Browning and D. A. Clarke-Smith as Edward Moulton-Barrett. On 2 April 1956 NBC's Producers' Showcase aired a production featuring Cornell as Elizabeth. A 1982 TV film of the play was made by the BBC starring Jane Lapotaire as Elizabeth, Joss Ackland as her father and Jeremy Brett as Browning (Brett had previously played Browning in 1972 on radio).

=== Radio ===
BBC Radio 4 broadcast an adaptation of the play in October 1972, with Dorothy Tutin as Elizabeth, Paul Rogers as her father and Jeremy Brett as Browning. It was rebroadcast in October 2025 on BBC Radio 4 Extra. Brett went on to play the same role on television in 1982.

=== Musical ===
The play also spawned a musical, Robert and Elizabeth, with book and lyrics by Ronald Millar and music by Ron Grainer. It opened in London on 20 October 1964, starring June Bronhill, Keith Michell and John Clements and ran for 948 performances.

== Sources ==
- Besier, Rudolf (1958) [1931]. The Barretts of Wimpole Street. Boston: Little, Brown and Company. OCLC 1023585543.
- Gaye, Freda, ed. (1967). Who's Who in the Theatre (fourteenth ed.). London: Sir Isaac Pitman and Sons. OCLC 5997224.
- Herbert, Ian, ed. (1977). Who's Who in the Theatre (sixteenth ed.). London and Detroit: Pitman Publishing and Gale Research. ISBN 978-0-273-00163-8.
- Hochman, Stanley, ed. (1984). McGraw-Hill Encyclopedia of World Drama. Vol. 1. New York: McGraw-Hill. ISBN 978-0-07-079169-5.
- Milberg, Doris (1990). Repeat Performances: A Guide to Hollywood Movie Remakes. Shelter Island: Broadway Press. ISBN 978-0-91-174721-8.
