= Lying Lips (1921 film) =

1921 film by John Griffith Wray

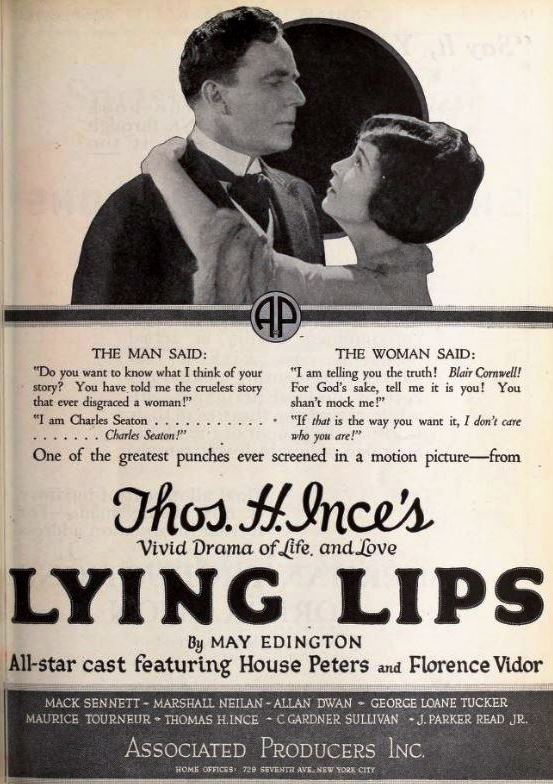
- Directed by: John Griffith Wray
- Written by: May Edginton (story); Bradley King
- Produced by: Thomas H. Ince
- Starring: House Peters; Florence Vidor; Joseph Kilgour
- Cinematography: Henry Sharp; Charles J. Stumar
- Production company: Thomas H. Ince Corporation
- Distributed by: Associated Producers
- Release date: January 30, 1921
- Running time: 70 minutes
- Country: United States
- Language: Silent (English intertitles)

Lying Lips is a 1921 American silent drama film directed by John Griffith Wray and starring House Peters, Florence Vidor, and Joseph Kilgour. Produced by the independent producer Thomas H. Ince for the short-lived Associated Producers company, the film was a financial success, grossing $446,000 against a budget of $263,000. It is based on a story by the British writer May Edginton.

== Plot ==
An English aristocrat, Nancy Abbott, is engaged to be married to William Chase, but before her wedding she visits Canada where she falls in love with Blair Cornwall, a rancher. On her return to London, she faces the difficulty of reconciling her love against fears of hardship.

== Cast ==
- House Peters as Blair Cornwall
- Florence Vidor as Nancy Abbott
- Joseph Kilgour as William Chase
- Margaret Livingston as Lelia Dodson
- Margaret Campbell as Mrs. Abbott
- Edith Murgatroyd as Mrs. Prospect
- Calvert Carter as Horace Prospect
- Emmett King as John Warren

== Preservation ==
A fragment of Lying Lips is held in the Ince collection.

== Bibliography ==
- Taves, Brian. Thomas Ince: Hollywood's Independent Pioneer. University Press of Kentucky, 2012.
