= Little Secrets =

Little Secrets may refer to:

== Film and television ==
- Little Secrets (TV series), a Turkish teen drama television series
- Little Secrets (2001 film), an American comedy-drama film
- Little Secrets (2006 film), a Luxembourgish film
- Little Secret (film), a 2016 Brazilian drama

== Music ==
- "Little Secrets" (Passion Pit song), 2009
- "Little Secrets" (Professor Green song), 2014
- Little Secret, a 2014 album by Canadian singer Nikki Yanofsky

== See also ==
- Secrecy (disambiguation)
- Secret (disambiguation)
- Secrets (disambiguation)
