= Secrets (1924 film) =

1924 silent film by Frank Borzage

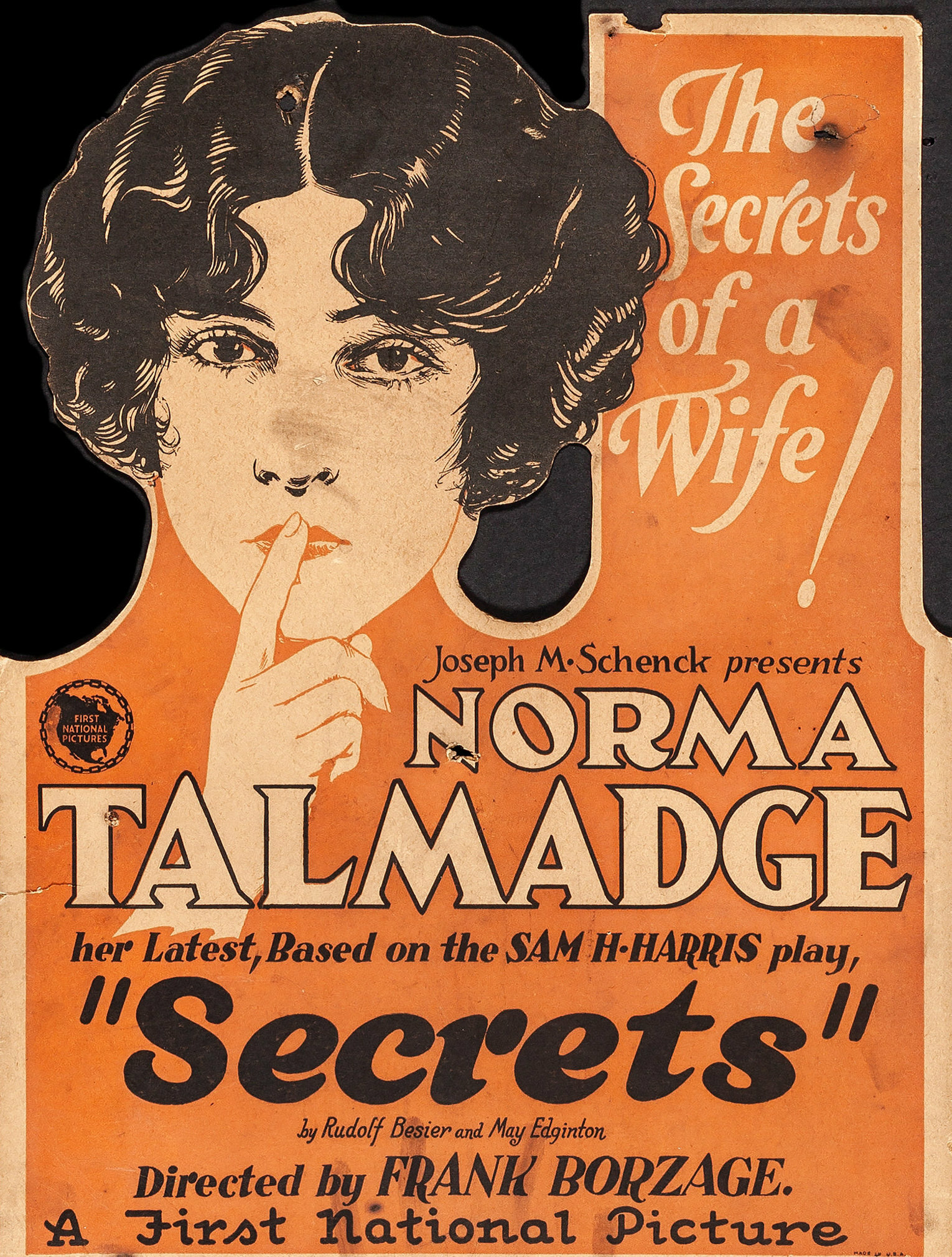
- Theatrical poster
- Directed by: Frank Borzage
- Written by: Frances Marion (screenplay); Rudolph Besier (play); May Edginton (play)
- Produced by: Norma Talmadge
- Starring: Norma Talmadge
- Cinematography: Tony Gaudio
- Distributed by: First National
- Release date: March 24, 1924
- Running time: 108 minutes
- Country: United States
- Language: Silent (English intertitles)
- Box office: $1,500,000

Secrets is a 1924 American silent drama film directed by Frank Borzage. The film is based upon a 1922 play of the same name, and was remade in 1933 with Mary Pickford in the leading role. Although the film was never released on video or DVD, copies still exist.

== Plot ==
The films opens in present. 75-year-old Mary Carlton is depressed over her husband John's illness. She feels her life has no use if he dies. She starts reading her diary, after which the film jumps to 1865 in the time she fell in love with John. She feels she has to hide her love for her strict mother, fearing she will disapprove because of their social class differences. Mary lives within the very wealthy Marlowe family and grows up to be a lady with manners, while John is a working class employee.

When her parents find out about the affair, they are outraged. They forbid her from ever seeing John again. However, Mary tells them she only loves John and will never marry anybody if she cannot see him anymore. Her father William locks her into her own room until she stops being a rebel. Meanwhile, she receives a letter from John, who announces he has been fired over their love affair. Later that night, John sneaks into her room by the balcony and announces he will leave for America. Despite knowing her parents will never talk to her again, she decides to go with him.

Before they can leave, William comes in. He tells Mary he will send her to Scotland to live with her grandmother. After he leaves the room, Mary writes a farewell letter and sneaks off with John. By the time it's 1870, she lives with John in a poor house. He works all day, while Mary is giving birth to a son. One day, a gang threatens to kill John. He wants to surrender so they will not kill Mary and the baby as well, but Mary demands him to fight. He does as his wife tells him and eventually defeats the gang.

Years pass by. In 1888, Mary celebrates her 39th birthday and is having contact with her family again. She finds out John is having a mistress, Estelle. Mary feels humiliated, but Estelle makes things worse when she confronts Mary with the fact she cannot make her husband happy. Mary grants her husband a divorce, but he does not want to leave her. He admits he has had an affair with Estelle, but that it didn't mean anything. They reunite, although John announces he has lost all of his money. The film goes back to present, where Mary is told her husband has recovered from his illness.

== Cast ==
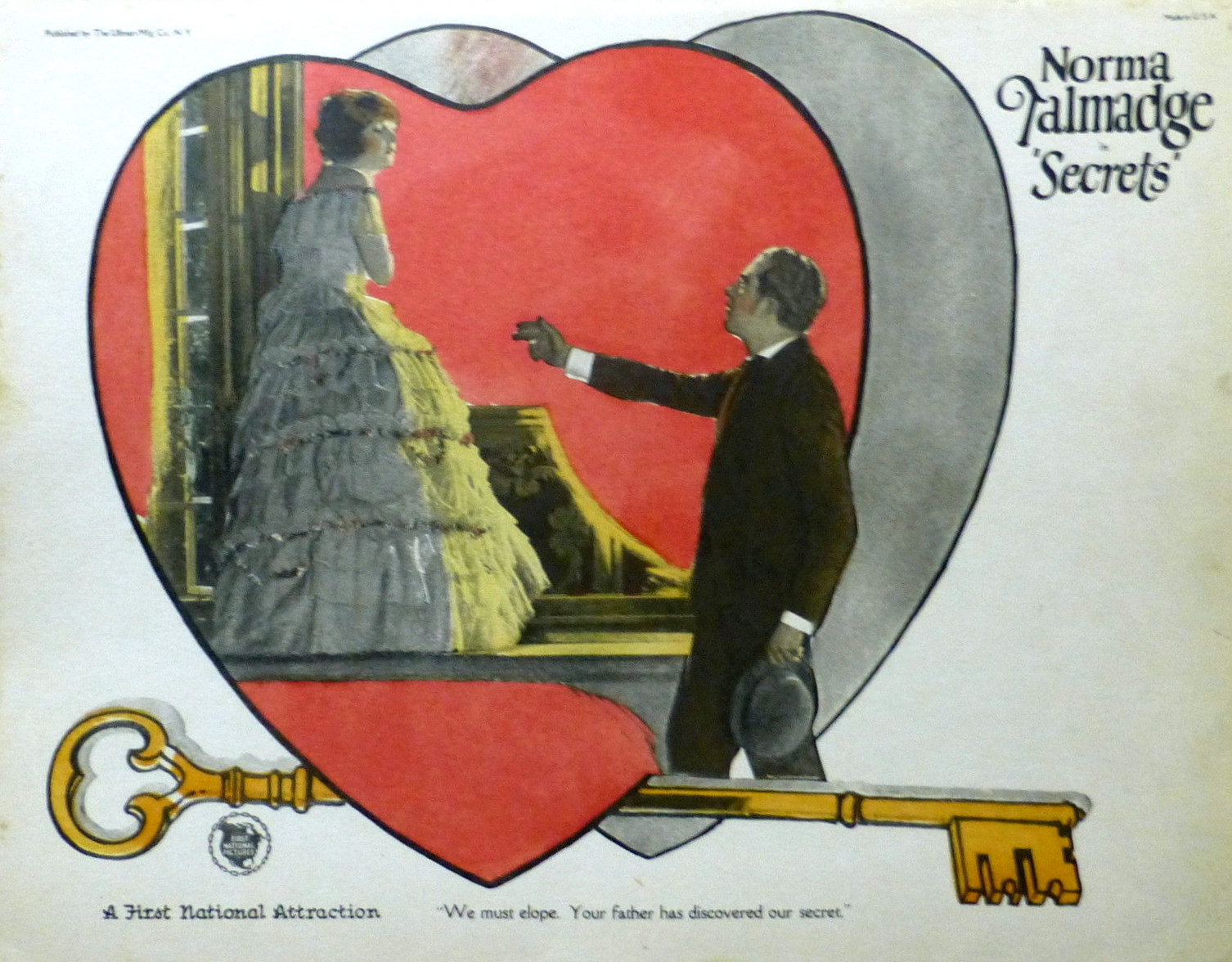
Lobby card

- Norma Talmadge as Mary Carlton
- Eugene O’Brien as John Carlton
- Winter Hall as Dr. Arbuthnot
- Frank Elliott as Robert Carlton
- George Cowl as John Carlton Jr.
- Clarissa Selwynne as Audrey Carlton
- Florence Wix as Lady Lessington
- Patterson Dial as Susan
- Emily Fitzroy as Mrs. Marlowe
- Claire McDowell as Elizabeth Channing
- George Nichols as William Marlowe
- Harvey Clark as Bob
- Charles Stanton Ogle as Dr. McGovern
- Donald Keith as John Carlton Jr. (1888)
- Alice Day as Blanche Carlton (1888)
- Mae Giraci as Audrey Carlton (1888)
- Gertrude Astor as Mrs. Estelle Manwaring
