= Robert and Elizabeth =

1964 musical by Ron Grainer and Ronald Millar

- Original Cast Recording
- Music: Ron Grainer
- Lyrics: Ronald Millar
- Book: Ronald Millar
- Basis: The Third Kiss by Fred G. Moritt and The Barretts of Wimpole Street by Rudolph Besier
- Productions: 1964 West End

Robert and Elizabeth is a musical with music by Ron Grainer and book and lyrics by Ronald Millar. The story is based on an unproduced musical titled The Third Kiss by Judge Fred G. Moritt, which in turn was adapted from the play The Barretts of Wimpole Street by Rudolph Besier. It is an operetta-style musical which tells the story of the romance and elopement of poets Robert Browning and Elizabeth Barrett. The original 1964 London production was a success, starring John Clements as Barrett, June Bronhill as Elizabeth and Keith Michell as Robert. Several revivals have followed.

== Songs ==
- "The Corner of Wimpole Street"
- "The Family Moulton-Barrett"
- "Frustration"
- "The Girls That Boys Dream About"
- "Hate Me, Please"
- "I Know Now"
- "I Said Love"
- "I'm the Master Here"
- "In A Simple Way"
- "Love and Duty"
- "The Moon in My Pocket"
- "Pass the Eau-de-Cologne"
- "The Real Thing"
- "Soliloquy"
- "Under a Spell"
- "Want to Be Well"
- "Escape Me Never" (lyric adapted from Browning)
- "What the World Calls Love"
- "What's Natural"
- "Woman And Man"
- "The World Outside"
- "You Only To Love Me"

== Productions ==
The original West End production opened at the Lyric Theatre in London on 20 October 1964 and ran for 948 performances. The cast was as follows:

- John Clements – Edward Moulton-Barrett
- June Bronhill – Elizabeth Barrett
- Keith Michell – Robert Browning
- Angela Richards – Henrietta

The original Australian production, in which June Bronhill reprised her London role, opened at the Princess Theatre, Melbourne on 21 May 1966. The cast also starred English actor Denis Quilley as Robert, Frank Thring as Edward, and included Madeleine Orr in a smaller role. The show ran for six months in Melbourne before moving to Sydney, where it ran for four weeks.

The musical was produced at the Yvonne Arnaud Theatre in Guildford, England, starring Jeremy Brett and Sally Ann Howes from 22 December 1976 to 29 January 1977. Another production ran at the Paper Mill Playhouse, Millburn, New Jersey, from November through December 1982, with Marc Jacoby as Robert and Leigh Beery as Elizabeth.

It was staged in the 1987 Chichester Festival, featuring Mark Wynter. A recording of the production was released by First Night Records (ASIN: B000024TK6). The musical then played at the Forum Theater in Chicago, Illinois in November 1974, with Steven Arlen as Robert.

The show was prevented from being produced on Broadway due to a copyright disagreement with the estate of Rudolph Besier, author of The Barretts of Wimpole Street, on which the story was partly based.
