= Secrets and Flies =

Secrets and Flies may refer to:

- "Secrets and Flies" (CSI: Crime Scene Investigation), a 2005 television episode
- "Secrets and Flies" (Gimme Gimme Gimme), a 2001 television episode

== See also ==
- Secrets and Lies (disambiguation)
