= Secrecy (disambiguation) =

Secrecy is the practice of sharing information among a group of people, which can be as small as one person, while hiding it from all others.

Secrecy may also refer to:

- Secrecy (book), a 1998 novel by Belva Plain
- Secrecy (film), a 2008 documentary film
- Secrecy (band), German progressive metal band from Bremen formed in 1987

== See also ==
- Little Secrets (disambiguation)
- Secret (disambiguation)
- Secrets (disambiguation)
