= New Frontier (film) =

1939 film

- Theatrical poster
- Directed by: George Sherman
- Screenplay by: Luci Ward; Betty Burbridge
- Based on: Based on characters by William Colt MacDonald
- Produced by: William A. Berke
- Starring: John Wayne; Ray Corrigan; Raymond Hatton; Phylis Isley
- Cinematography: Reggie Lanning
- Edited by: Tony Martinelli
- Music by: William Lava
- Production company: Republic Pictures
- Distributed by: Republic Pictures
- Release date: August 10, 1939
- Running time: 57 minutes
- Country: United States
- Language: English

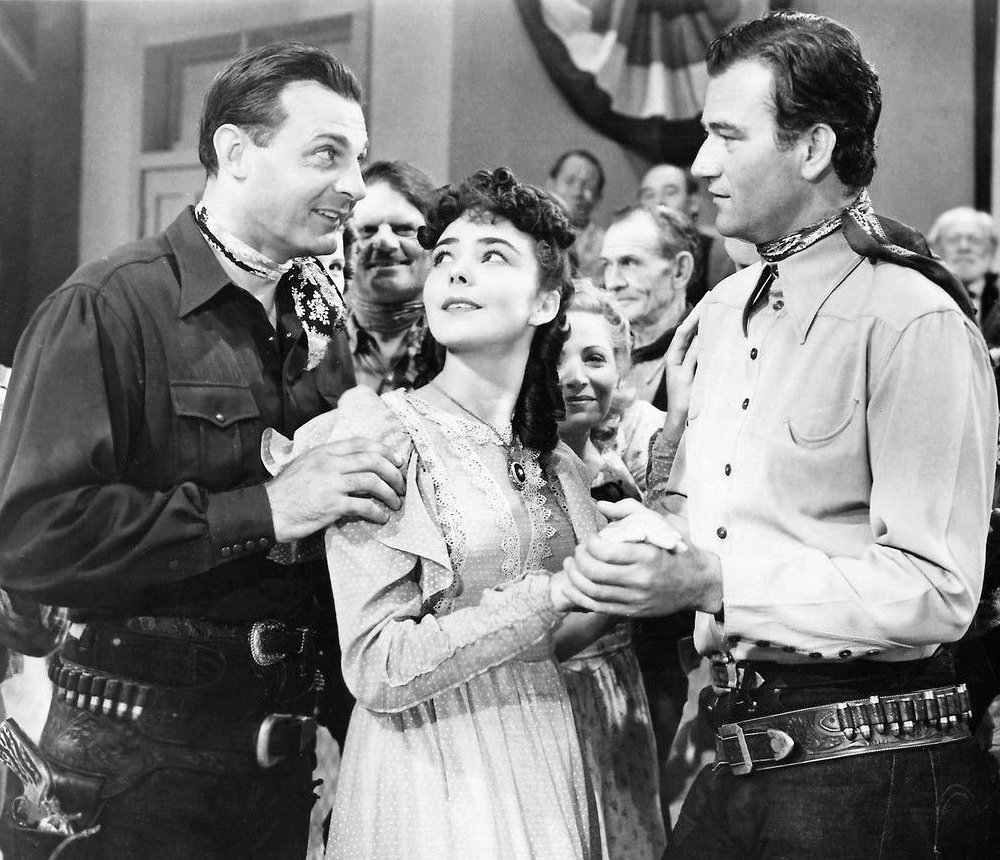
Ray Corrigan, Jennifer Jones (billed as "Phylis Isley"), and John Wayne in New Frontier (1939)

New Frontier (also known as Frontier Horizon) is a 1939 American Western film starring John Wayne, Ray "Crash" Corrigan, Raymond Hatton, and Jennifer Jones. This was the last of eight Three Mesquiteers Western B-movies with Wayne (there were 51 altogether). A restored 35 mm copy of the film exists, and was screened at the Museum of Modern Art in New York City as part of a 2007 John Wayne centennial retrospective, which included The Big Trail, The Searchers, and True Grit. The leading lady is Jennifer Jones, billed as Phylis Isley, in her film debut. The director was George Sherman.

== Plot ==
When politician William Proctor announces that a dam will be built on a site where many settlers have built homes, a retired major who founded the settlement leads a backlash. Eventually, the fight comes to the attention of the Three Mesquiteers—Stoney Brooke, Tucson Smith and Rusty Joslin—who try to find a peaceful solution. However, they soon realize Proctor will resort to any trickery to get his way.

== Cast ==
- John Wayne as Stony Brooke
- Ray Corrigan as Tucson Smith
- Raymond Hatton as Rusty Joslin
- Jennifer Jones as Celia Braddock (billed as Phylis Isley)
- Eddy Waller as Major Steven Braddock
- Sammy McKim as Stevie Braddock
- LeRoy Mason as M.C. Gilbert
- Harrison Greene as William Proctor
- Wilbur Mack as Mr. Dodge
- Reginald Barlow as Judge Bill Lawson
- Burr Caruth as Dr. William "Doc" Hall
- Dave O'Brien as Jason Braddock
- Hal Price as Sheriff
- Jack Ingram as Henchman Harmon
- Bud Osborne as Dickson

== See also ==
- John Wayne filmography
