= Jennifer Jones =

American actress (1919–2009)

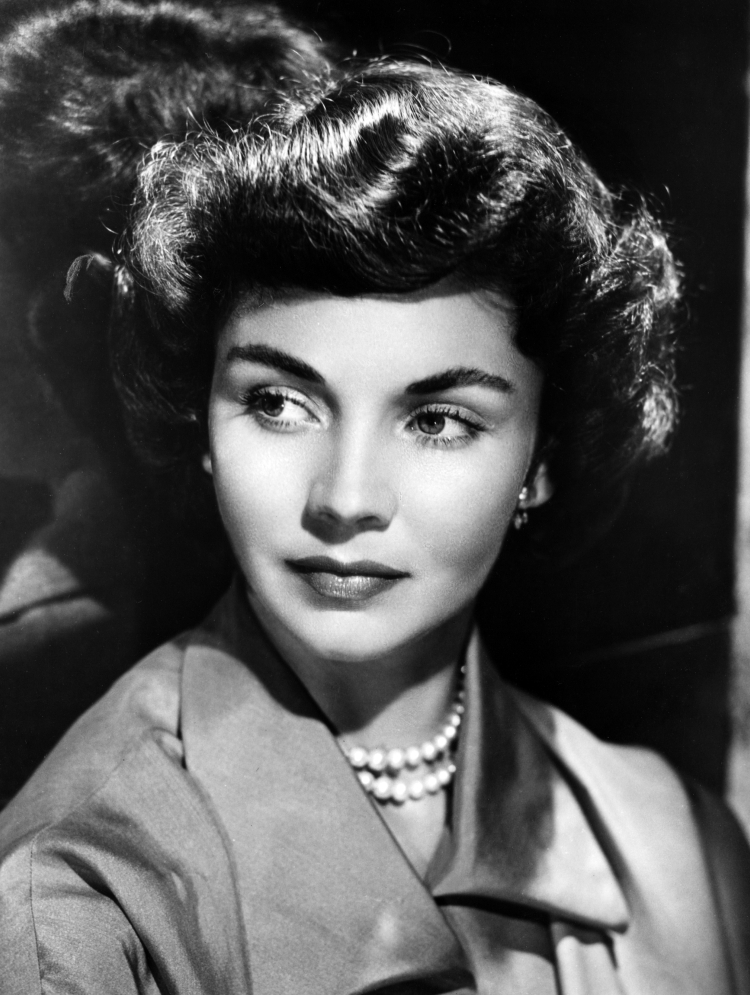
- Jones in 1953
- Born: Phylis Lee Isley; March 2, 1919; Tulsa, Oklahoma, U.S.
- Died: December 17, 2009 (aged 90); Malibu, California, U.S.
- Resting place: Forest Lawn Memorial Park, Glendale, California, U.S.
- Occupation: Actress
- Years active: 1939–1974
- Known for: The Song of Bernadette
- Spouses: Robert Walker (m. 1939; div. 1945) David O. Selznick (m. 1949; died 1965) Norton Simon (m. 1971; died 1993)
- Children: 3, including Robert Walker, Jr.

Jennifer Jones (born Phylis Lee Isley; March 2, 1919 – December 17, 2009), also known as Jennifer Jones Simon, was an American actress and mental-health advocate. Her first notable award and nomination was by Picturegoer Awards, as she won Best Actress of the year. Over the course of her career that spanned more than five decades, she was also nominated for an Academy Award five times, including one win for Best Actress, and a Golden Globe Award for Best Actress in a Motion Picture – Drama.

A native of Tulsa, Oklahoma, Jones worked as a model in her youth before transitioning to acting, appearing in a western and serial in 1939. She remained off the screen until 1943. Her third role was a lead part as Bernadette Soubirous in The Song of Bernadette (1943), which earned her the Academy Award and Golden Globe for Best Actress. She went on to star in several films that garnered her significant critical acclaim and a further three Academy Award nominations in the mid-1940s, including Since You Went Away (1944), Love Letters (1945) and Duel in the Sun (1946).

In 1949, Jones married film producer David O. Selznick and appeared as the eponymous Madame Bovary in Vincente Minnelli's 1949 adaptation. She appeared in several films throughout the 1950s, including Ruby Gentry (1952), John Huston's adventure comedy Beat the Devil (1953) and Vittorio De Sica's drama Terminal Station (1953). Jones earned her fifth Academy Award nomination for her performance as a Eurasian doctor in Love Is a Many-Splendored Thing (1955). After Selznick's death in 1965, Jones married industrialist Norton Simon and entered semi-retirement. She made her final film appearance in The Towering Inferno (1974), a performance which earned her a nomination for a Golden Globe Award for Best Supporting Actress in a Motion Picture.

Jones suffered from mental-health problems during her life. After her 22-year-old daughter, Mary Jennifer Selznick, took her own life in 1976, Jones became deeply involved in mental health education. In 1980, she founded the Jennifer Jones Simon Foundation for Mental Health and Education. Jones enjoyed a quiet retirement, living the last six years of her life in Malibu, California, where she died of natural causes in 2009 at the age of 90.

== Biography ==
=== 1919–1939: Early life ===
Phylis Lee Isley was born in Tulsa, Oklahoma, on March 2, 1919, the daughter of Flora Mae (née Suber) and Phillip Ross Isley. Her father was originally from Georgia, and her mother was a native of Sacramento, California. She was an only child, and she was raised Catholic. Her parents, both aspiring stage actors, toured the Midwest in a traveling tent show that they owned and operated. Jones accompanied them, performing on occasion as part of the Isley Stock Company.

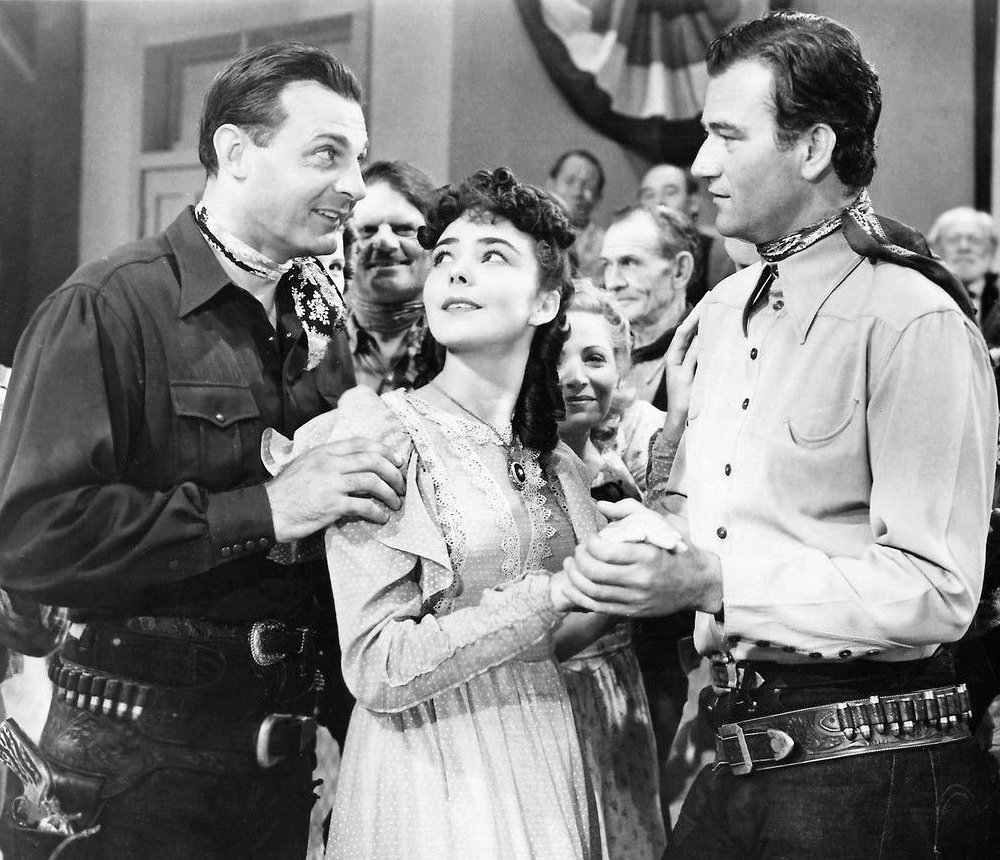
Jones with Ray Corrigan (left) and John Wayne (right) in New Frontier (1939)

In 1925, Isley enrolled at Edgemere Public School in Oklahoma City, then attended Monte Cassino, a Catholic girls school and junior college in Tulsa. After graduating, she enrolled as a drama major at Northwestern University in Illinois, where she was a member of Kappa Alpha Theta sorority before transferring to the American Academy of Dramatic Arts in New York City in September 1937. It was there that she met and fell in love with fellow acting student Robert Walker, a native of Ogden, Utah, and left school. They married on January 2, 1939.

By the 1930s her father, Phil Isley, ran a chain of movie theaters in Texas, and was influential in her early dramatic career. Mr. and Mrs. Walker returned to Tulsa for a 13-week radio program arranged by her father and then moved to Hollywood. It is quite possible that he arranged for his daughter's screen contract with the small independent studio Republic Pictures. Under her maiden name of Phylis Isley, she played ingenues in a Three Mesquiteers western New Frontier, filmed in the summer of 1939 for Republic Pictures. Her second project was the serial Dick Tracy's G-Men (1939), also for Republic. The 20-year-old hopeful made little impression and Republic did not extend her contract. After failing a screen test for Paramount Pictures, she became disenchanted with Hollywood and returned to New York City.

=== 1939–1949: Career beginnings ===
Shortly after her marriage, she gave birth to two sons: Robert Walker Jr. (1940–2019), and Michael Walker (1941–2007). While Walker found steady work in radio programs, Isley worked part-time modeling hats for the Powers Agency, and posing for Harper's Bazaar while looking for acting jobs. When she learned of auditions for the lead role in Rose Franken's hit play Claudia in the summer of 1941, she presented herself to David O. Selznick's New York office but fled in tears after what she thought was a bad reading. However, Selznick had overheard her audition and was impressed enough to have his secretary call her back. Following an interview, she was signed to a seven-year contract.

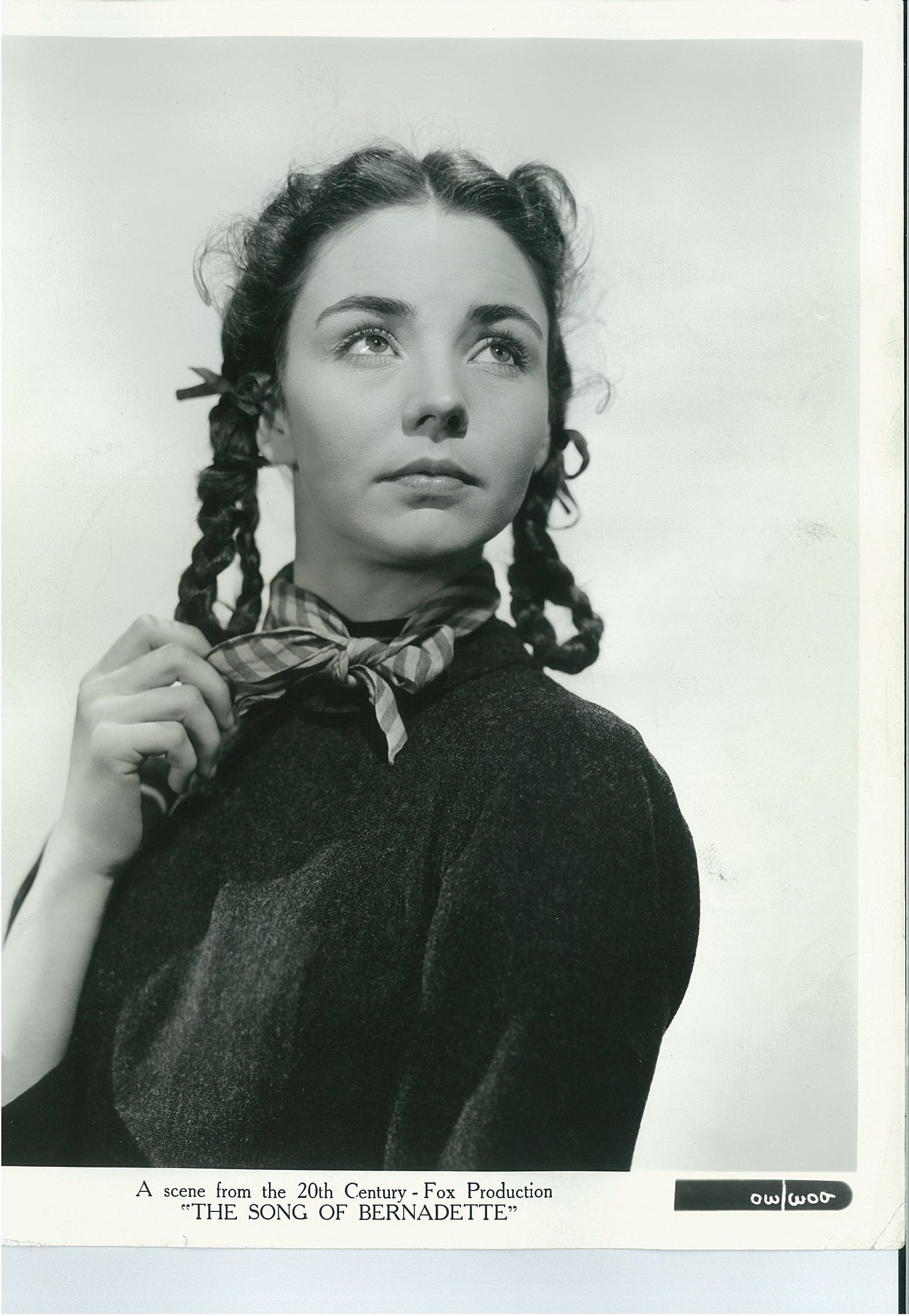
Jones as Bernadette Soubirous in The Song of Bernadette (1943)

She was carefully groomed for stardom and given a new name: Jennifer Jones. Director Henry King was impressed by her screen test as Bernadette Soubirous for The Song of Bernadette (1943), and she won the coveted role over hundreds of applicants. In 1944, on her 25th birthday, she won the Academy Award for Best Actress for her performance as Bernadette, her third screen role.

Simultaneously to her rise in prominence for The Song of Bernadette, Jones began an affair with producer Selznick. She separated from Walker in November 1943, co-starred with him in Since You Went Away (1944), and formally divorced him in June 1945. For her performance in Since You Went Away, she was nominated for her second Academy Award, this time for Best Supporting Actress. She earned a third successive Academy Award nomination for her performance with Joseph Cotten in Love Letters (1945).

Jones's saintly image from her first starring role was starkly contrasted three years later when she was cast as a biracial woman in Selznick's controversial Duel in the Sun (1946), in which she portrayed a mixed-race indigenous (mestiza) orphan in Texas who falls in love with a white man (Gregory Peck).

Also in 1946, she starred as the title character in Ernst Lubitsch's romantic comedy Cluny Brown as a working-class English woman who falls in love just before World War II. She next appeared in the fantasy film Portrait of Jennie (1948), again costarring with Cotten. The film was based on the novella of the same name by Robert Nathan. However, it was a commercial failure, grossing only $1.5 million against a $4 million budget.

=== 1949–1965: Marriage to Selznick ===
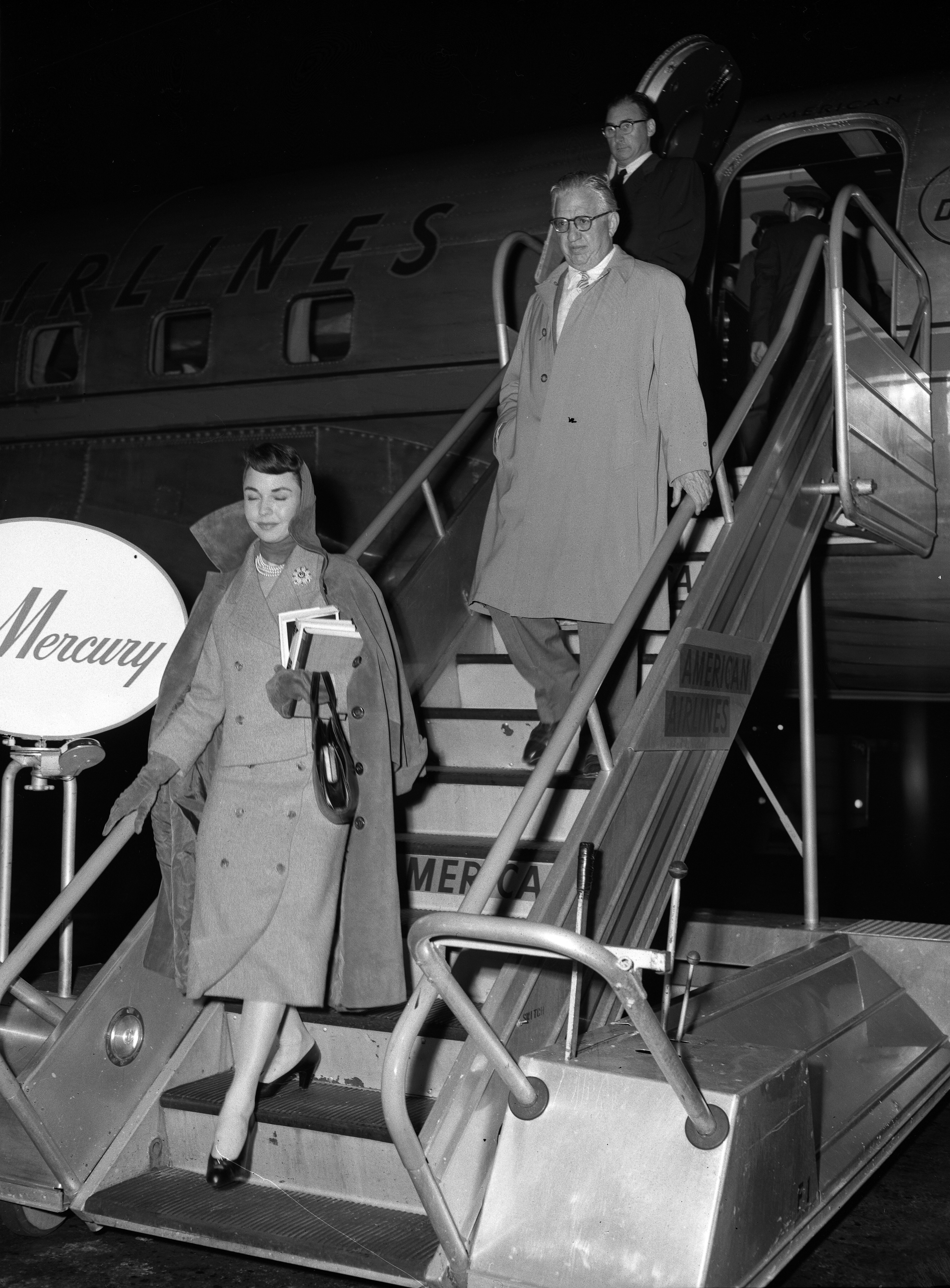
Jones and second husband David O. Selznick in 1957

Jones married Selznick at sea on July 13, 1949, en route to Europe after a five-year relationship. Over the following two decades, she appeared in numerous films that he produced, and they established a working relationship. In 1949, Jones starred opposite John Garfield in John Huston's adventure film We Were Strangers. Bosley Crowther of The New York Times felt that Jones's performance was lacking, noting: "There is neither understanding nor passion in the stiff, frigid creature she achieves." She was subsequently cast as the title character of Vincente Minnelli's Madame Bovary (1949), a role originally intended for Lana Turner that Turner declined. Variety deemed the film "interesting to watch, but hard to feel," although it noted that "Jones answers to every demand of direction and script." In 1950, Jones starred in the Powell and Pressburger-directed fantasy Gone to Earth as a superstitious gypsy woman in the English countryside.

Jones next starred in William Wyler's drama Carrie (1952) with Laurence Olivier. Crowther criticized her performance, writing: "Mr. Olivier gives the film its closest contact with the book, while Miss Jones' soft, seraphic portrait of Carrie takes it furthest away." Also in 1952, she costarred with Charlton Heston in Ruby Gentry, playing a femme fatale in rural North Carolina who becomes embroiled in a murder conspiracy after marrying a local man. The role was previously offered to Joan Fontaine, who felt that she was "unsuited to play backwoods." In its review, Variety deemed the film a "sordid drama [with] neither Jennifer Jones nor Charlton Heston gaining any sympathy in their characters."

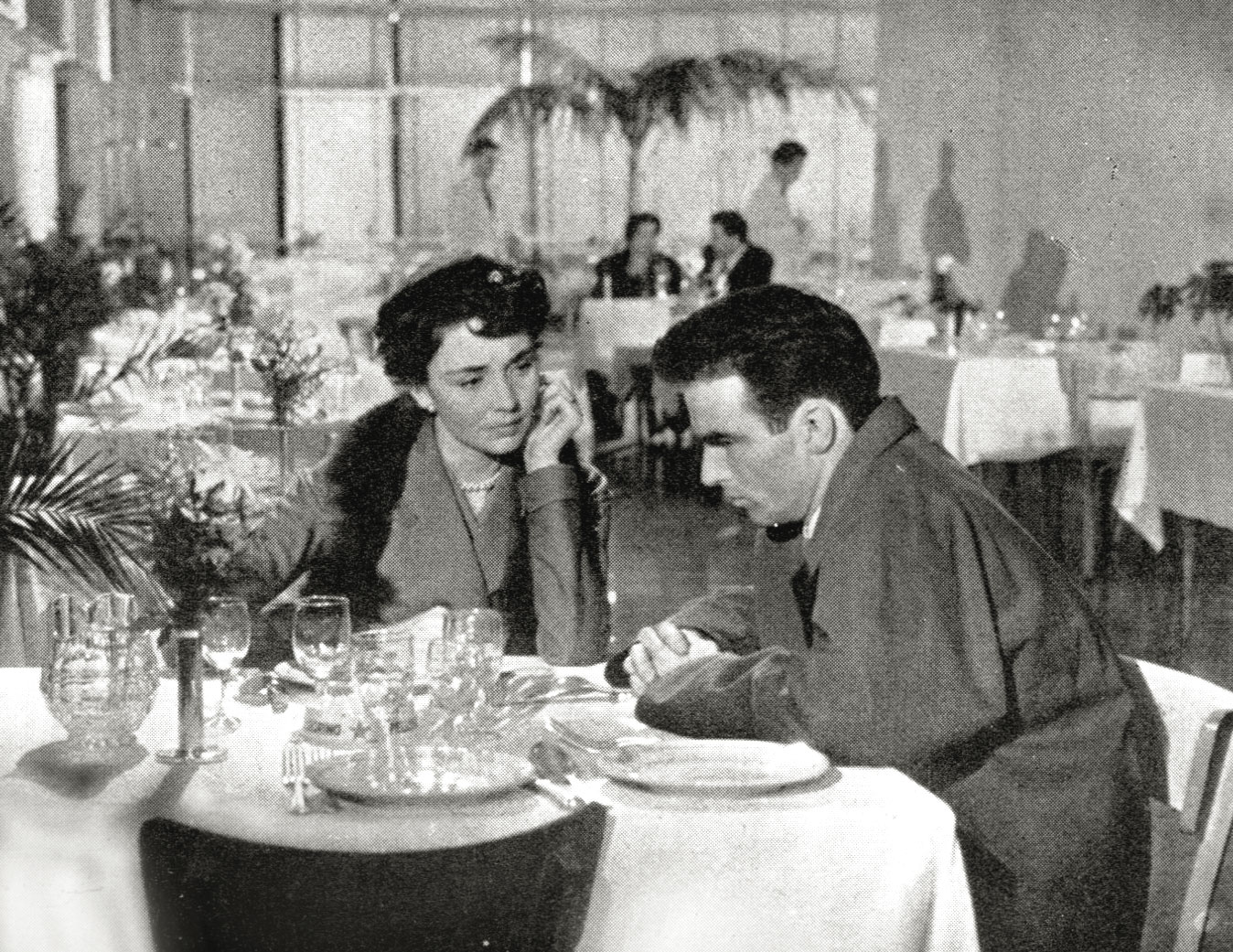
Jones and Montgomery Clift in Terminal Station (1953)

In 1953, Jones was cast opposite Montgomery Clift in Italian director Vittorio De Sica's Terminal Station (Stazione termini), a drama set in Rome about a romance between an American woman and an Italian man. The film, produced by Selznick, had a troubled production history, and Selznick and De Sica clashed over the screenplay and tone of the film. Clift sided with De Sica and reportedly called Selznick "an interfering fuck-face" on set. Aside from the tensions between cast and crew, Jones was mourning the recent death of her first husband Robert Walker, and also missed her two sons, who were staying in Switzerland during production. Terminal Station was screened at the 1953 Cannes Film Festival and was released in a heavily truncated form in the United States with the title Indiscretion of an American Wife. Also in 1953, Jones teamed again with director John Huston to star in his film Beat the Devil (1953), an adventure comedy costarring Humphrey Bogart. The film was a box-office flop and was critically panned upon release, and Bogart distanced himself from it. However, it was reevaluated in later years by critics such as Roger Ebert, who included it in his list of "Great Movies" and cited it as the first "camp" film. In August 1954, Jones gave birth to her third child, daughter Mary Jennifer Selznick.

Jones was cast as Chinese-born doctor Han Suyin in the drama Love Is a Many-Splendored Thing (1955), a role that brought her fifth Academy Award nomination. Crowther lauded her performance as "... lovely and intense. Her dark beauty reflects sunshine and sadness." Next, she starred as a schoolteacher in Good Morning, Miss Dove (1955), followed by a lead role in The Man in the Gray Flannel Suit, a drama about a World War II veteran.

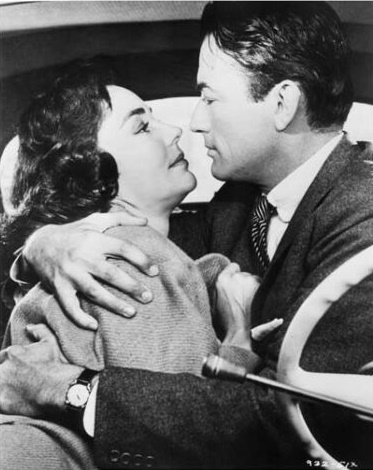
Jones with Gregory Peck in a film still for The Man in the Gray Flannel Suit (1956)

In 1957, she starred as the poet Elizabeth Barrett Browning in the historical drama The Barretts of Wimpole Street, based on the 1930 play by Rudolf Besier. She next played the lead role in the Ernest Hemingway adaptation A Farewell to Arms (1957). The film received mixed reviews, with Variety noting that "the relationship between Rock Hudson and Jennifer Jones never takes on real dimensions." Jones's next project came five years later with the F. Scott Fitzgerald adaptation Tender Is the Night (1962).

=== 1965–2009: Later life and activities ===
Selznick died at age 63 on June 22, 1965, and after his death, Jones semiretired from acting. Her first role in four years was a lead part in the British drama The Idol (1966) as the mother of an adult son in Swinging Sixties London who has an affair with his best friend.

In 1966, Jones made a rare theatrical appearance in the revival of Clifford Odets' The Country Girl, costarring Rip Torn, at New York's City Center. On November 9, 1967, the same day on which her close friend Charles Bickford died of a blood infection, Jones attempted suicide. Informing her physician of her intention to jump from a cliff overlooking Malibu Beach, she swallowed barbiturates before walking to the base of the cliff, where she was found unconscious amidst the rocky surf. According to biographer Paul Green, it was news of Bickford's death that triggered Jones's suicide attempt. She was hospitalized in a coma from the incident. She returned to film with Angel, Angel, Down We Go in 1969, about a teenage girl who uses her association with a rock band to manipulate her family.

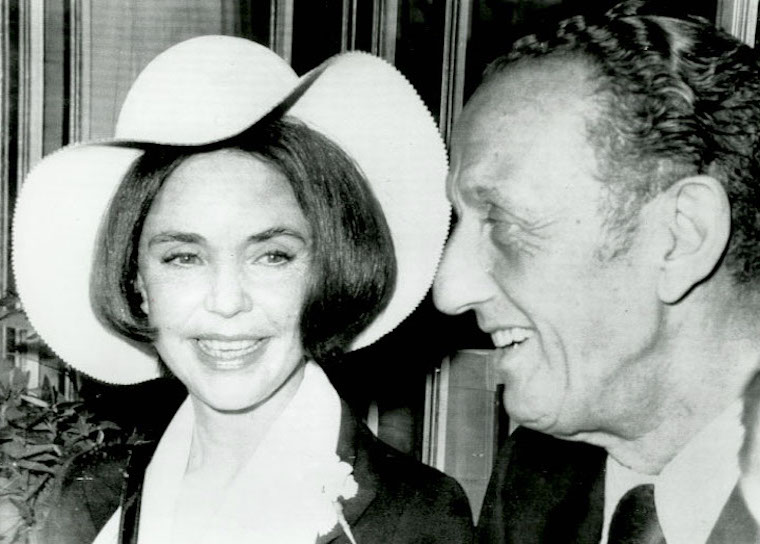
Jones with husband Norton Simon after their marriage, May 1971

On May 29, 1971, Jones married her third husband Norton Simon, a multimillionaire industrialist, art collector and philanthropist from Portland, Oregon. The wedding took place aboard a tugboat five miles off the English coast and was conducted by Unitarian minister Eirion Phillips. Years before, Simon had attempted to buy the portrait of Jones that was used in the film Portrait of Jennie. Simon later met Jones at a party hosted by fellow industrialist and art collector Walter Annenberg. Jones's last film appearance came in the disaster film The Towering Inferno (1974). Her performance as a doomed resident in the eponymous skyscraper earned her a Golden Globe nomination for Best Supporting Actress. Early scenes in the film showed paintings lent to the production by the art gallery of Jones's husband Simon.

On May 11, 1976, Jones's 21-year-old daughter Mary Selznick, a student at Occidental College, died by suicide by jumping from the roof of a 22-floor apartment hotel in downtown Los Angeles. This led to Jones's interest in mental health issues. In 1979, with husband Simon (whose son Robert died by suicide in 1969), she founded the Jennifer Jones Simon Foundation for Mental Health and Education, which she ran until 2003. One of Jones's primary goals with the foundation was to destigmatize mental illness. In 1980, Jones said: "I cringe when I admit I've been suicidal, had mental problems, but why should I? I hope we can reeducate the world to see there's no more need for stigma in mental illness than there is for cancer." She also divulged that she had been a psychotherapy patient since age 24.

Jones spent the remainder of her life outside of the public eye. Four years before the death of her husband Simon in June 1993, he resigned as president of Norton Simon Museum in Pasadena, California, and Jones was appointed chairman of the board of trustees, president and executive officer. In 1996, she began working with architect Frank Gehry and landscape designer Nancy Goslee Power to renovate the museum and gardens. She remained active as the director of the museum until 2003, when she was awarded emerita status.

== Personal life ==
Jones suffered from shyness for much of her life and avoided discussing her past and personal life with journalists. She was also averse to discussing critical analysis of her work. Public discussion of her working relationship with Selznick often overshadowed her career. Biographer Paul Green contends that, while Selznick helped facilitate her career and sought roles for her, "Jones excelled because she not only possessed outstanding beauty but she also possessed genuine talent."

== Death ==
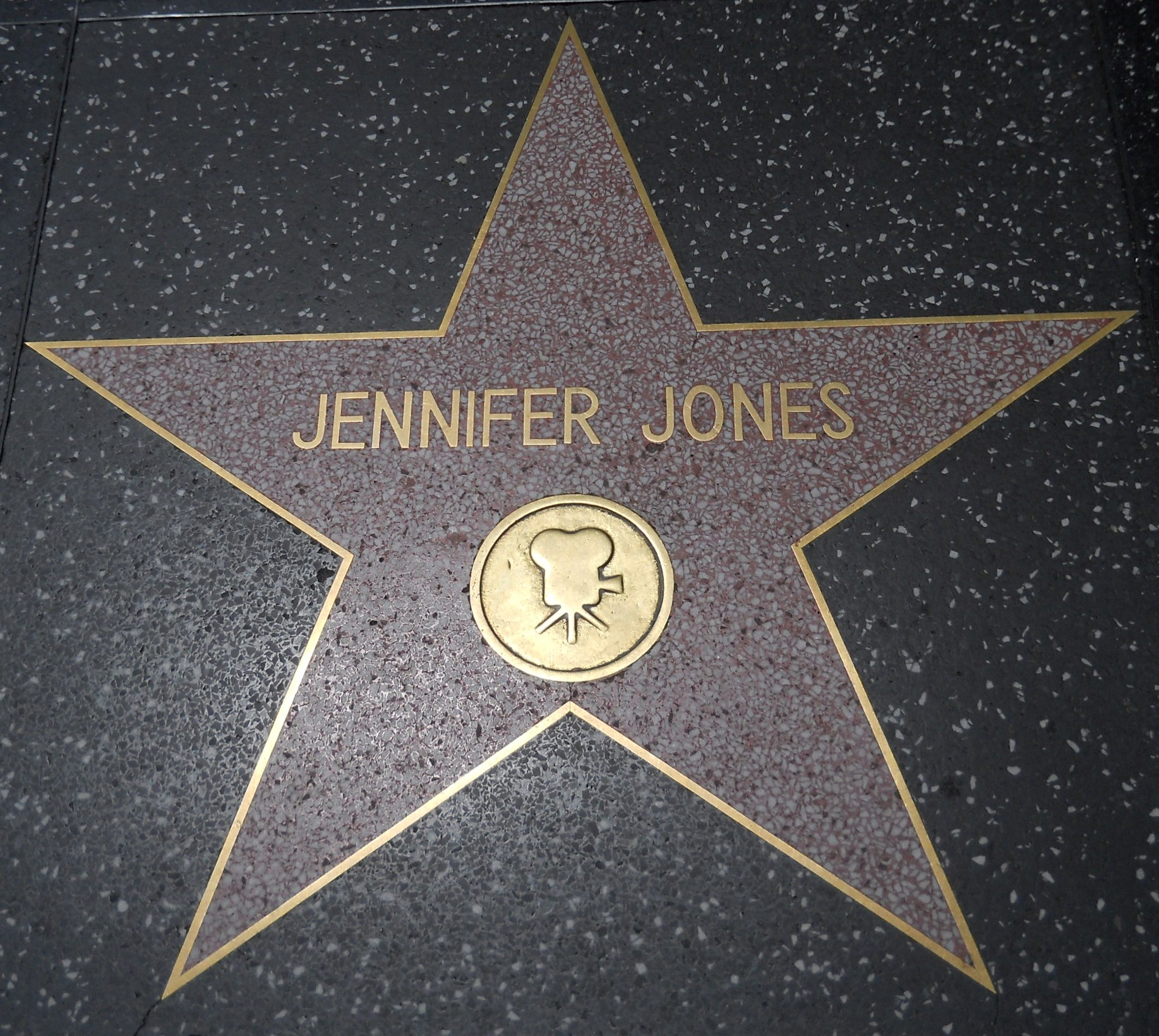
Jones' star on the Hollywood Walk of Fame at 6429 Hollywood Boulevard

Jones enjoyed a quiet retirement, living with her eldest child, son Robert Walker Jr., and his family in Malibu for the last six years of her life. Jones's younger son, actor Michael Ross Walker, died from cardiac arrest on December 23, 2007, at age 66, while Robert Jr. died on December 5, 2019, at age 79.

Jones participated in Gregory Peck's AFI Life Achievement Award ceremony in 1989 and appeared at the 70th (1998) and 75th (2003) Academy Awards as part of the shows' tributes to past Oscar winners. In the last six years of her life, she granted no interviews and rarely appeared in public. She died of natural causes on December 17, 2009, at age 90. She was cremated and her ashes were interred with her second husband in the Selznick private room at the Forest Lawn Memorial Park in Glendale, California.

Minor planet 6249 Jennifer is named in her honor.

== Filmography ==
Year	Title	Role	Notes
1939	New Frontier	Celia Braddock	As Phyllis Isley; film debut
1939	Dick Tracy's G-Men	Gwen Andrews	As Phyllis Isley; 15-chapter serial
1943	The Song of Bernadette	Bernadette Soubirous	Academy Award for Best Actress; Golden Globe Award for Best Actress – Motion Picture Drama; Locarno International Film Festival - Best Actress
1944	Since You Went Away	Jane Deborah Hilton	Nominated - Academy Award for Best Supporting Actress
1944	The Fighting Generation	Nurse's aid	Short film promtoting war bonds
1945	Love Letters	Singleton / Victoria Morland	Nominated - Academy Award for Best Actress
1946	Cluny Brown	Cluny Brown	Locarno International Film Festival - Best Actress
1946	Duel in the Sun	Pearl Chavez	Nominated - Academy Award for Best Actress
1948	Portrait of Jennie	Jennie Appleton	
1949	We Were Strangers	China Valdés	
1949	Madame Bovary	Emma Bovary	
1950	Gone to Earth	Hazel Woodus	Released as The Wild Heart (heavily edited) in the U.S.
1952	Carrie	Carrie Meeber	
1952	Ruby Gentry	Ruby Gentry	
1953	Terminal Station	Mary Forbes	Released as Indiscretion of an American Wife in the U.S.
1953	Beat the Devil	Mrs. Gwendolen Chelm	
1955	Love Is a Many-Splendored Thing	Dr. Han Suyin	Nominated - New York Film Critics Circle Award for Best Actress (3rd place); Nominated - Academy Award for Best Actress
1955	Good Morning, Miss Dove	Miss Dove	
1956	The Man in the Gray Flannel Suit	Betsy Rath	
1957	The Barretts of Wimpole Street	Elizabeth Barrett	
1957	A Farewell to Arms	Catherine Barkley	
1962	Tender Is the Night	Nicole Diver	
1966	The Idol	Carol	
1969	Angel, Angel, Down We Go	Astrid Steele	a.k.a. Cult of the Damned
1974	The Towering Inferno	Lisolette Mueller	Nominated - Golden Globe Award for Best Supporting Actress – Motion Picture

== Awards and nominations ==
Academy Awards

Year	Category	Work	Result
1956	Best Actress	Love Is a Many-Splendored Thing	Nominated
1947	Best Actress	Duel in the Sun	Nominated
1946	Best Actress	Love Letters	Nominated
1945	Best Supporting Actress	Since You Went Away	Nominated
1944	Best Actress	The Song of Bernadette	Won

Golden Globe Awards

Year	Category	Work	Result
1975	Best Supporting Actress in a Motion Picture	The Towering Inferno	Nominated
1944	Best Actress – Motion Picture Drama	The Song of Bernadette	Won

== See also ==
- List of oldest and youngest Academy Award winners and nominees

== Sources ==
- Bazin, André (2014). Bazin on Global Cinema, 1948-1958. Austin, Texas: University of Texas Press. ISBN 978-0-292-76740-9.
- Bosworth, Patricia (1978). Montgomery Clift: A Biography. New York: Bantam Books. ISBN 978-0-553-12455-2.
- Green, Paul (2011). Jennifer Jones: The Life and Films. Jefferson, North Carolina: McFarland. ISBN 978-0-786-48583-3.
- Muchnic, Suzanne (1998). Odd Man in: Norton Simon and the Pursuit of Culture. Los Angeles: University of California Press. ISBN 978-0-520-20643-4.
