= The Fighting Generation =

1944 film by Alfred Hitchcock

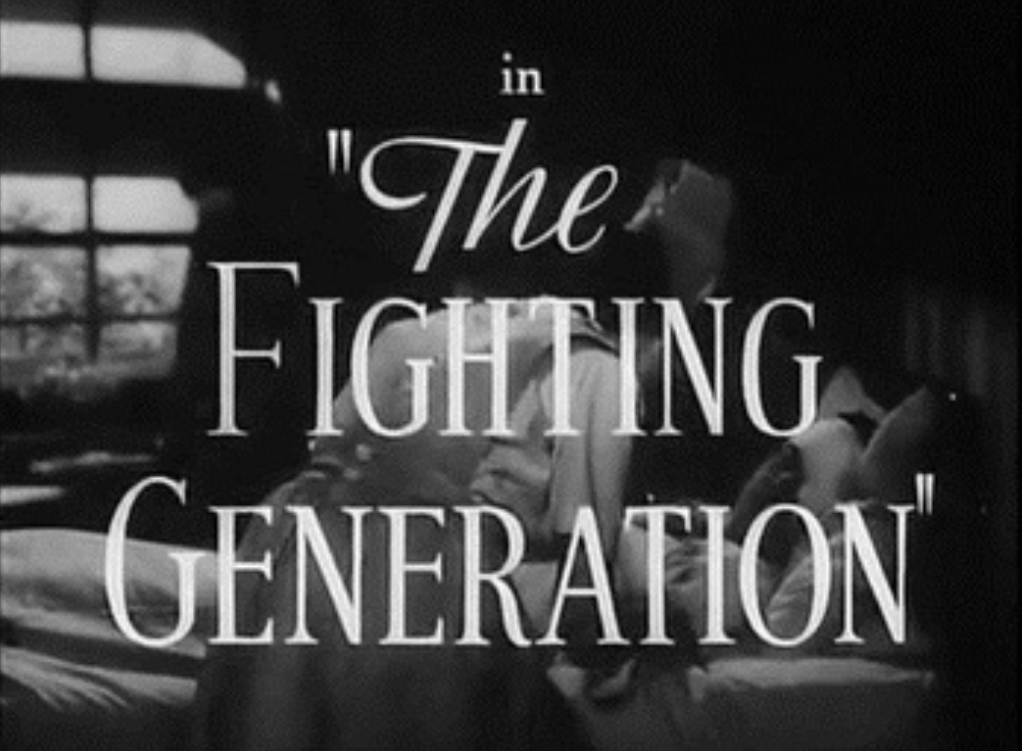
- Directed by: Alfred Hitchcock (uncredited)
- Written by: Stephen Longstreet
- Produced by: David O. Selznick
- Starring: Jennifer Jones
- Production company: Selznick International Pictures
- Distributed by: RKO Pictures
- Release date: October 1944
- Running time: 1 minute 52 seconds
- Country: United States
- Language: English

The Fighting Generation is a 1944 short film, a public service announcement produced by David O. Selznick and directed by an uncredited Alfred Hitchcock to promote war bond sales during the Sixth War Loan Drive. Jennifer Jones stars as a nurse's aide.

The film was shot in a single day, on October 9, 1944. Rhonda Fleming and actors Steve Dunhill and Tony Devlin were to appear in the scene, according to a call sheet, but in the end, only Jones appears on-screen.

The film survives in the Academy Film Archive and was preserved in 2008. The film is part of the Academy War Film Collection, one of the largest collections of World War II-era short films held outside government archives.
