= May Edginton =

English novelist and playwright (1883–1957)

- Evening News, 1928
- Born: Helen Marion Edginton; 20 December 1883; England, UK
- Died: 17 June 1957 (aged 73); Rondebosch, South Africa
- Other names: H.M. Edginton, May Edginton
- Occupation: Writer
- Years active: 1907–1955
- Spouse: Francis Evans Baily (1912-1930)
- Children: 1

May Edginton (originally Helen Marion Edginton, 20 December 1883 – 17 June 1957) was an English writer who had over 50 popular novels published in London. She also wrote plays, collaborating with Rudolf Besier on two of them. Some of her fiction works were filmed. Her work was translated into several languages, including Hungarian and Chinese.

== Biography ==
Edginton was born on 20 December 1883 in England. She wrote for The Royal Magazine, where she met the editorial staff and also novelist Francis Evans Baily (1887-1962), whom she married in 1912. They had one son, and separated in 1930.

She died at 73 in Rondebosch, South Africa, on 17 June 1957.

== Fiction, plays and films ==
Edginton started to write novels in 1908. Many explore domestic predicaments. The Sin of Eve (1913) features a working woman, who leaves the suffragette cause to get married. Others of the novels examine escapes or solutions for heroines in domestic predicaments. Married Life, or The True Romance (1917), for example, shows the disintegrating relations between newly-weds living on a small income. The wife depends wholly on the husband for money and is tied to the home by the arrival of their three children, so losing all power and independence. However, she manages to reverse the situation while her husband is away on a business trip. Woman of the Family (1936) has the "household drudge" Eve advance from a secretarial job to being a dance-club hostess, yet in marriage still having "no right to her own money". She escapes with one of the club's wealthy clients.

Some of Edginton's fiction has been filmed – the story "World Without End" as His Supreme Moment (1925), starring Blanche Sweet, the novel Purple and Fine Linen as Three Hours (1927) starring Corinne Griffith and later as Adventure in Manhattan (1936) starring Jean Arthur, and The Joy Girl, adapted as such (1927), starring Olive Borden.

Her two plays, co-written with Rudolf Besier, were Secrets (1922) and The Prude's Fall (1920). Both were later filmed, the first of them twice: Secrets (1924) with Norma Talmadge and Secrets (1933) with Mary Pickford. The Prude's Fall appeared as Dangerous Virtue (1924), directed by Graham Cutts, art direction by Alfred Hitchcock, starring Jane Novak and Julanne Johnston.

Edginton's final novel was Two Lost Sheep (1955).

== Filmography ==
- The Double Cross (1912)
- The Love Auction (1919)
- Lying Lips (1921)
- Creation (1922)
- Secrets (1924)
- Triumph (1924)
- Her Husband's Secret (1924)
- His Supreme Moment (1925)
- The Prude's Fall (1925)
- Three Hours (1927)
- The Woman Who Squandered Men (1927)
- The Joy Girl (1927)
- The False Madonna (1931)
- Secrets (1933)
- Adventure in Manhattan (1936)
