= Adventure in Manhattan =

1936 film by Edward Ludwig

- Theatrical poster
- Directed by: Edward Ludwig
- Written by: Sidney Buchman; Harry Sauber; Jack Kirkland; John Howard Lawson (uncredited adaptation)
- Story by: Joseph Krumgold
- Produced by: Everett Riskin
- Starring: Jean Arthur; Joel McCrea
- Cinematography: Henry Freulich
- Edited by: Otto Meyer
- Music by: William Grant Still
- Distributed by: Columbia Pictures Corporation
- Release date: October 8, 1936
- Running time: 73 minutes
- Country: United States
- Language: English

Adventure in Manhattan (UK title: Manhattan Madness) is a 1936 American screwball comedy thriller film directed by Edward Ludwig and starring Jean Arthur and Joel McCrea. The screenplay was written by Sidney Buchman, Harry Sauber, Jack Kirkland, and John Howard Lawson (uncredited adaptation). The story was written by Joseph Krumgold, suggested by the novel Purple and Fine Linen by May Edginton (spelled as Edington in the film). The supporting cast features Reginald Owen and Thomas Mitchell, and the film was a Columbia Pictures production.

== Plot ==
Robbers steal the "Koor-Hal Ruby", killing four in the process, and elude the police. Newspaper managing editor Phil Bane sends for conceited crime writer/criminologist George Melville to write stories and boost his circulation. Melville claims the crime was masterminded by Andre Berlea, a man thought to have died four years before. He predicts to reporters that Berlea will next steal the Sunburst Diamond and kill the only witness, a butler, to the ruby theft. Seconds later, they receive news that a butler has been murdered.

On his way to see Bane, Melville is about to give a female panhandler some money when he is distracted by a car accident. The woman takes the opportunity to steal his wallet. He follows her to a beauty salon. When she emerges, after a complete makeover, she begs him not to do anything until after 8 o'clock. Over dinner, she explains that she ran away from her cruel husband with another man, from whom she later separated. Her ex-husband is finally letting her see her daughter, who turned four that day, and she needed the money to make herself presentable. They drive to a fancy mansion. Mrs. Northrop faints when she is shown a coffin; Mr. Northrop explains that the child died two days before. However, all is not as it seems. It turns out to be an elaborate practical joke on Melville concocted by the reporters; one of them is writing a play, Fury's Road, and Claire Peyton ("Mrs. Northrop") is the star. Mr. Northrop was played by the producer, Blackton Gregory.

Minutes later, they learn that a famous painting has been stolen from next door. Gregory savors his latest acquisition in secret. When a henchman suggests getting rid of Melville, Gregory turns him down. Having found a worthy foe, he will not do something so crude. He goes to see Melville and hires him to help with the play. He asks why Melville is so sure that Berlea is alive. Melville explains that he believes that Berlea has a compulsion to own beautiful things. Before he "died", he tried to buy three such objects, but was turned down. Now two of them have been stolen. Melville predicts that the third, the Starburst Diamond, will be purloined on Saturday at 11 pm. Bane has faith in him and keeps his staff after hours and notifies the authorities, who set up a stakeout at the bank where the jewel is stored. When the deadline passes without anything happening, Bane fires Melville. Melville agrees to go to Gregory's retreat for a rest.

Gregory's men have dug a tunnel between the theater where the play, set on the front lines of World War I, will be performed and the bank. At the premiere, when mock explosions and firing are set off in a battle scene, they blast their way into the vault. When Peyton discovers the theft, she fears for Melville's life. However, Melville has been one step ahead of his nemesis, and later that night captures Gregory/Berlea. Furious at being fooled, she makes her own prediction: "to make him suffer for the rest of his life" ... by marrying him.

== Cast ==
- Jean Arthur as Claire Peyton
- Joel McCrea as George Melville
- Reginald Owen as Blackton Gregory
- Thomas Mitchell as Phil Bane
- Victor Kilian as Mark Gibbs
- John Gallaudet as McGuire
- Emmett Vogan as Lorimer
- George Cooper as Duncan
- Herman Bing as Otto
- Robert Warwick as Phillip

== Reception ==
Frank Nugent described the film in The New York Times as "a lightweight and moderately diverting mystery tale which hurdles its absurdities with the greatest of ease and will be forgotten almost as soon as it fades from the screen." In a 2011 article, Dave Kehr called it "a tedious mystery comedy, which opens with an astonishingly tasteless practical joke involving a dead child".

== Home media ==
The film is available on DVD as part of the Jean Arthur Comedy Collection, released by Sony Pictures Home Entertainment.
