= Secrets and Lies =

Secrets and Lies may refer to:

== Film and television ==
- Secrets & Lies (film), a 1996 film directed by Mike Leigh
- Secrets & Lies (Australian TV series), a 2014 Australian television series
- Secrets and Lies (American TV series), a 2015 American television series, based on the Australian series
- Secrets and Lies (South Korean TV series), a 2018 South Korean television series

=== Episodes ===
- "Secrets and Lies" (30 Rock), 2007
- "Tigh Me Up, Tigh Me Down", originally titled "Secrets and Lies", a 2004 episode of the re-imagined Battlestar Galactica
- "Secrets and Lies", a 2007 episode of The Best Years
- "Secrets and Lies" (Dawson's Creek), 1999
- "Secrets & Lies", an episode from the first season of Degrassi: The Next Generation
- "Secrets and Lies" (Desperate Housewives), 2007 special
- "Secrets and Lies" (Doctors), 2000
- "Secrets and Lies" (ER), 2002
- "Secrets and Lies", a 2018 Instinct episode
- "Secrets & Lies", Episode 58 in H_{2}O: Just Add Water
- "Secrets and Lies" (Murdoch Mysteries), 2018
- "Secrets and Lies" (Pan Am), 2012
- "Secrets and Lies" (Doc), 2025

== Books ==
- Secrets and Lies (book), a 1999 book by Nicky Hager
- Secrets and Lies, a 2005 book by David Southwell
- Secrets and Lies: Digital Security in a Networked World, a book by Bruce Schneier

== Music ==
- Secret & Lies, a 2003 EP by U-ka Saegusa in dB
- Secrets and Lies (album), a 2009 album by Bertie Blackman
- Secrets & Lies (album), a 2020 album by Jakko Jakszyk

== See also ==
- Secrets and Flies (disambiguation)
