= Secrets of the Heart =

Secrets of the Heart may refer to:

- Secrets of the Heart (film), a 1997 Spanish film
- "Secrets of the Heart" (song), a 1991 song by Chesney Hawkes
