= Secret (chocolate bar) =

British chocolate bar

Secret was a chocolate bar manufactured by Rowntree Mackintosh which was popular in the United Kingdom in the 1990s. It was invented during the 1980s. The chocolate coating was styled like a bird's nest, while the centre was a creamy mousse filling similar to that of a Walnut Whip. Packaged in a gold-coloured wrapper, the word "Secret" was printed on the front in purple letters.

A well known television advertisement for Secret launched in 1990 featured an elegant woman on a train who is approached by a stranger who gives her a chocolate bar and tells her to "Guard this with your life". The woman is unable to resist and eats it, while a voice-over says, "You can't trust anyone to keep a Secret".

The Secret chocolate bar was discontinued in the late 1990s. It was due to high production costs and low sales volumes. In recent years, fans of the Secret chocolate bar have urged Nestlé, which has since acquired Rowntree Mackintosh, to bring back the product. In 2025, Nestlé responded that they had no plans to bring back the Secret chocolate bar.
