= Rudolf Besier =

Dutch dramatist (1878–1942)

- Born: Rudolf Wilhelm Besier; 2 July 1878; Blitar, East Java, Dutch East Indies
- Died: = 16 June 1942; Surrey, England
- Occupations: Dramatist, playwright

Rudolf Wilhelm Besier (2 July 1878 – 16 June 1942) was a Dutch-English dramatist and playwright and translator best known for his play The Barretts of Wimpole Street (1930). He worked with H. G. Wells, Hugh Walpole and May Edginton on dramatisations.

== Biography ==
=== Early life ===
Besier was born in Blitar, East Java (Dutch East Indies), on 2 July 1878, the son of an English mother, Margaret Ann Collinson, and Dutch soldier Rudolf Wilhelm Besier, who died six months before he was born and after whom he was named.

=== Career ===
Besier had some limited success early in his career in England, which began with The Virgin Goddess (1906) produced by Otho Stuart and with music by Christopher Wilson. Then followed a series of plays, mainly dramas, but including some satires and comedies. In 1912 he collaborated with H. G. Wells on dramatising Wells's Kipps; he also worked with Hugh Walpole on Robin's Father (1918). Secrets (1922) was written with May Edginton (1883–1957).

Besier's major success came with The Barretts of Wimpole Street (1930), based on poet Elizabeth Barrett and her courtship with playwright Robert Browning. After being rejected by two London producers, it premièred at the Malvern Festival of 1930, directed by Sir Barry Jackson. Besier failed to interest American producers, 27 of whom rejected his play, but actress Katharine Cornell took a personal interest in it. She had it staged in Cleveland in 1931, and then in New York. It was revived and produced in many countries, and was made into two films and a musical.

=== Death ===
Rudolf Besier died in Surrey, England in 1942, aged 63.

== Plays (selected) ==
- The Virgin Goddess: a tragedy (1906)
- Don: a comedy in three acts, 1908 (produced 1909)
- Olive Latimer's Husband, 1909 (produced 1910)
- The Foolish Virgin (produced 1910-11)
- Lady Patricia: a comedy in three acts, 1911 (produced 1912)
- Kipps (1912; with H. G. Wells, based on his book)
- Her Country (produced 1918)
- Robin's Father (1918; with Hugh Walpole)
- Secrets, 1922 (with May Edginton; produced 1922–23; filmed 1924, 1933)
- A Lesson in Love, 1922 (prod, 1923)
- Prude's Fall (filmed 1924)
- The Barretts of Wimpole Street: a comedy in five acts (produced 1930, Malvern; 1931, Cleveland; Broadway; revived 1935, 1945; filmed 1934, 1957); the ultimate basis of the 1964 musical Robert and Elizabeth)

== Sources ==
- Rudolf Besier at IMDb
- doolee.com
- Rudolf Besier at the Internet Broadway Database
- Playwrights and Their Stage Works
