= Secrets (1922 play) =

1922 play by Rudolf Besier and May Edginton

Secrets is a 1922 play by Rudolf Besier and May Edginton.

The play first opened in London at the Comedy Theatre on 7 September 1922, starring Fay Compton and Leon Quartermaine.

Secrets opened in New York at the Fulton Theatre on 25 December 1922, and ran through May 1923, for 168 performances.

The play was also adapted for films released in 1924 and 1933.

It was also adapted for Australian radio in 1925.

== London cast (partial) ==
Produced by John Eugene Vedrenne

- Fay Compton as Lady Carlton
- Doris Mansell as Lady Lessington
- Margaret Scudamore as Mrs. Marlowe
- Hubert Harben as William Marlowe
- Bobbie Andrews as John Carlton

== Broadway cast (partial) ==
Directed by Sam Forrest and produced by Sam H. Harris

- Margaret Lawrence as Lady Carlton
- Barbara Allen as Lady Lessington
- Mrs. Edmund Gurney as Mrs. Marlowe
- Orlando Daly as William Marlowe
- Tom Nesbit as John Carlton
- Allan Jenkins as Briggs
- Beatrice Kay as Blanche
- Frazer Coulter as Dr. Arbuthnot
