= Vernon Downing =

British actor (1913–1973)

- Born: 1913
- Died: 1973 (aged 59–60)
- Occupation: Actor
- Years active: 1934–1954

Vernon Downing (1913–1973) was a British actor who appeared in many Hollywood films between 1934 and 1954, generally playing English characters.

== Filmography ==
Year	Title	Role	Notes
1934	Treasure Island	Boy at Inn	Uncredited
1934	The Barretts of Wimpole Street	Octavius Barrett	
1935	Clive of India	Stringer	Uncredited
1935	Les Misérables	Brissac	
1935	The Dark Angel	Man in Dormitory	Uncredited
1935	I Found Stella Parish	Slave in Play	Uncredited
1935	Mutiny on the Bounty	Hayward	
1935	East of Java	Pilot	Uncredited
1936	King of Burlesque	Man in Car	Uncredited
1936	The Farmer in the Dell	Rowland Jamison	Uncredited
1936	Romeo and Juliet	Samson - Servant of the House of Capulet	Uncredited
1937	The Emperor's Candlesticks	Auction House Assistant	Uncredited
1938	Lord Jeff	Lift Boy	Uncredited
1938	Marie Antoinette	Man in Gaming House	Uncredited
1939	Wuthering Heights	Giles	Uncredited
1940	Pride and Prejudice	Capt. Carter	
1940	Mystery Sea Raider	Martin	Uncredited
1940	The Howards of Virginia	John Walker	Uncredited
1941	International Squadron	Bar Boy	Uncredited
1941	Suspicion	Benson	Uncredited
1942	The Wife Takes a Flyer	English Officer	Uncredited
1943	Sherlock Holmes Faces Death	Clavering	
1943	Corvette K-225	Officer	Uncredited
1943	The Spider Woman	Norman Locke	
1943	A Guy Named Joe	English Liaison Officer	Uncredited
1944	The White Cliffs of Dover	Lieutenant Davis Herrick	Uncredited
1944	The Canterville Ghost	Officer	Uncredited
1945	This Man's Navy	English Officer	Uncredited
1946	The Time of Their Lives	Leigh - Traitor	Uncredited
1946	Cloak and Dagger	British Sergeant	Uncredited
1947	The Macomber Affair	Reporter Logan	
1947	Last of the Redmen	British Officer	Uncredited
1947	Golden Earrings	Club Member with Reynolds	Uncredited
1947	Forever Amber	Fop	Uncredited
1948	A Woman's Vengeance	Chemist	Uncredited
1948	Homecoming	British Soldier	Uncredited
1948	The Three Musketeers	Officer	Uncredited
1949	Challenge to Lassie	Marching Soldier	Uncredited
1952	Million Dollar Mermaid	Newspaper Man	Uncredited
1953	Rogue's March	Military Policeman	Uncredited
1953	Fort Vengeance	Minor Role	Uncredited
1954	The Iron Glove	British Turnkey	Uncredited
