= Secrets (1933 film) =

1933film

- Theatrical poster
- Directed by: Frank Borzage
- Written by: Salisbury Field; Frances Marion; Leonard Praskins
- Based on: Secrets; 1922 play by Rudolph Besier; May Edginton
- Produced by: Mary Pickford and M. C. Levee
- Starring: Mary Pickford; Leslie Howard
- Cinematography: Ray June
- Edited by: Hugh Bennett
- Music by: Alfred Newman
- Distributed by: United Artists
- Release date: March 16, 1933
- Running time: 90 minutes
- Country: United States
- Language: English

Secrets is a 1933 American pre-Code Western film directed by Frank Borzage and starring Mary Pickford in her last film role. The film is a remake of Secrets (1924), a silent film starring Norma Talmadge, which was based on a 1922 play of the same name.

In 1930, Pickford had begun a remake of the Norma Talmadge Secrets titled Forever Yours with director Marshall Neilan and actors Kenneth MacKenna and Don Alvarado. After spending $300,000, Pickford stopped production and destroyed all the negatives because she was unhappy with the results; in 1933 a fresh start with Borzage was announced.

== Plot ==
Wealthy banker and shipowner William Marlowe and his wife Martha have their hearts set on marrying their daughter Mary to English aristocrat Lord Hurley. However, Mary has other ideas. She has fallen in love with John Carlton, one of her father's clerks. When Mr. Marlowe finds out, he fires John. John decides to go west to make his fortune, then return for Mary, but she insists on going with him. They elope.

The couple settle in California and after a while, have a herd of cattle and a baby boy. While John and hired hand Sunshine are away getting supplies, notorious outlaw Jake Houser and his gang show up and rustle the herd. John rounds up the other ranchers. They catch and hang three of the gang, including Jake's brother, but Jake gets away. Vowing revenge, Jake and his men attack the Carlton home. Help arrives and the rustlers are wiped out. The baby succumbs to illness during the gunfight.

Years pass, and the Carltons prosper greatly. Four more children are born, and John runs for governor of the state. They host a party on the night before the election at their mansion. Lolita Martinez, John's lover, scandalizes everyone by showing up. In private, she insists that Mary free John to marry her. Mary agrees, but John spurns his mistress and begs his wife's forgiveness; she gives it on condition that he tell her about all his prior lovers. Lolita makes public their affair, but John still wins the election.

Later, he becomes a senator, serving for thirty years in Washington, D.C. before deciding to retire and move back to California. This puzzles the couple's grown children; Mary explains that they want time for themselves, to enjoy secrets they can share with no one else. When their offspring still oppose their decision, the couple sneak away.

== Cast ==
- Mary Pickford as Mary Marlowe Carlton
- Leslie Howard as John Carlton
- C. Aubrey Smith as Mr. William Marlowe
- Blanche Friderici as Mrs. Martha Marlowe (as Blanche Frederici)
- Doris Lloyd as Susan Channing, Mary's friend
- Herbert Evans as Lord Hurley
- Ned Sparks as Sunshine
- Allan Sears as Jake Houser
- Mona Maris as Señora Lolita Martinez
- Huntley Gordon as William Carlton as an Adult
- Ethel Clayton as Audrey Carlton as an Adult
- Bessie Barriscale as Susan Carlton as an Adult
- Theodore von Eltz as Robert Carlton as an Adult

== Reception ==
The New York Times review was mixed: "Mary Pickford, whose comely presence has not decorated the Broadway screens for two years...is now to be seen...in a very free translation of the play 'Secrets.' This current offering has its intriguing episodes, notably in the beginning, but the latter sections are somewhat confusing. It seems as if Frances Marion, who was responsible for the adaptation, had suddenly reaized, after becoming very enthusiastic over her own ideas that there must be something about the basic thought of the parent work in the production. Therefore the 'Secrets' part of the film does not emerge until an entirely different story is well under way, and when it comes, it is a sorry surprise. It is then that one hears that John Carlton, who has shown himself to be a heroic and an ideal husband, has been philandering in a California city....Notwithstanding the disjointed story, Leslie Howard favors it with an excellent performance. He is admirable as the love-lorn young man, and he looks the rugged pioneer in subsequent episodes. But one cannot say that he ever strikes one as a man who has clandestine appointments with fast women. Miss Pickford is vivacious and charming in the New England phases of the picture, but her acting during the hard times in the log cabin is not always convincing. She is at her best in the lighter interludes....C. Aubrey Smith does capital work as Mary's unsympathetic father. In fact, it is with regret that one leaves him to go West, for it is quite evident that this good actor will not be seen again. And he is not. There is, however, Mr. Howard, besides Miss Pickford, all through the years of this trying tale."
