= Malvern Festival (1929–1939) =

Drama festival in Worcestershire, England

The Malvern Festival was first held in 1929 and ran annually until 1939. It was founded by Sir Barry Jackson who also founded Birmingham Repertory Theatre.

In 1929, the festival was devoted to modern plays, particularly those of its patron, George Bernard Shaw, and the Festival Company included two recent graduates from the Royal Central School of Speech and Drama – Eve Turner and Yvette Pienne.

== See also ==
- Malvern, Worcestershire § Drama
