= David O. Selznick filmography =

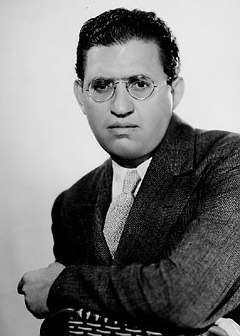
David O. Selznick

David O. Selznick (1902–1965) was an American motion picture producer whose work consists of three short subjects, 67 feature films, and one television production made between 1923 and 1957. He was the producer of the 1939 epic Gone with the Wind. Selznick was born in Pittsburgh and educated in public schools in Brooklyn and Manhattan. He began working in the film industry in New York while in his teens as an assistant to his father, jeweler-turned-film producer Lewis J. Selznick. In 1923, he began producing films himself, starting with two documentary shorts and then a minor feature, Roulette (1924). Moving to Hollywood in 1926, Selznick became employed at Metro-Goldwyn-Mayer (MGM), where he produced two films before switching to Paramount in early 1928. After helping to guide Paramount into the sound era, Selznick moved to RKO Radio in 1931 where he served as the studio's executive producer. During his time at RKO he oversaw the production of King Kong (1933) and helped to develop Katharine Hepburn and Myrna Loy into major film stars.

In 1933 Selznick returned to MGM, this time as a vice-president in charge of his own production unit. During his two years with the studio he produced elaborate versions of Leo Tolstoy's Anna Karenina and Charles Dickens' David Copperfield and A Tale of Two Cities. In 1935, he left MGM to form his own production company, Selznick International Pictures, where he produced adaptations of Robert Smythe Hichens' The Garden of Allah (1936), Frances Hodgson Burnett's Little Lord Fauntleroy (1936), Anthony Hope's The Prisoner of Zenda (1937), and Mark Twain's The Adventures of Tom Sawyer (1938). Selznick also became a pioneer in the use of Technicolor with the first and last of these films and also with his productions of A Star Is Born and Nothing Sacred (both 1937). In 1939, Selznick brought Swedish actress Ingrid Bergman to the United States to star in Intermezzo and the following year he brought Alfred Hitchcock over from England to direct Rebecca. Also in 1939, Selznick produced his epic version of Margaret Mitchell's Gone With the Wind, which became the most financially successful film of all time.

Selznick liquidated his corporation in the early 1940s but returned to independent producing in 1943. His work from this period included two more Hitchcock films, Spellbound (1945) and The Paradine Case (1948) and several films starring Jennifer Jones, among them Since You Went Away (1944), Duel in the Sun (1946) and Portrait of Jennie (1948). Selznick ceased his independent productions in 1948. Beginning with Carol Reed's The Third Man (1949), he entered into a period of co-producing motion pictures with other filmmakers. In 1954, he made his sole venture into television with the production Light's Diamond Jubilee. Selznick retired from filmmaking after producing an adaptation of Ernest Hemingway's A Farewell to Arms (1957).

Selznick's productions were the recipients of numerous Academy Award nominations. Two of his films—Gone With the Wind and Rebecca—won Academy Awards for Best Picture. Six other films that he produced—Viva Villa! (1934), David Copperfield (1935), A Tale of Two Cities (1935), A Star is Born (1937), Since You Went Away (1944), and Spellbound (1945)—were nominated for Best Picture. As of 2013, four of the films Selznick produced have been added to the National Film Registry: King Kong (1933), The Prisoner of Zenda (1937), Gone With the Wind (1939), and The Third Man (1949). For his work in motion pictures, Selznick received a star on the Hollywood Walk of Fame.

"There are only two kinds of class: First class and no class."
— David O. Selznick

== Filmography ==
The release dates, titles, and names of the directors for Selznick's films are derived from the filmographies presented in the books Memo From David O. Selznick by Rudy Behlmer and David O. Selznick's Hollywood by Ronald Haver. The quotes are derived from Behlmer's book.

=== Early shorts ===
Selznick began working in the film industry while in his early teens. He was employed—after school hours—by his father, film producer Lewis J. Selznick, initially as head of publicity and advertising and later as a newsreel film editor. When the elder Selznick went bankrupt in 1923, young David took a job as a promoter for a two-reel short about prizefighter Luis Firpo. Afterwards he convinced the Mineralava Beauty Clay Company to produce a two-reel film of a beauty contest they were sponsoring with actor Rudolph Valentino as the judge.

Release date	Title	Director	Notes
April 23, 1923	Will He Conquer Dempsey?	(none credited)	Silent
1923	Rudolph Valentino and His 88 American Beauties	(none credited)	Silent

=== Aetna-Selznick Distributing Corporation ===
I promoted and made for $17,000 a little picture called Roulette … As I recall, it didn't lose any money, but it didn't make any worth mentioning.

— David O. Selznick

Release date	Title	Director	Notes
January 19, 1924	Roulette	S. E. V. Taylor	Silent

=== Metro-Goldwyn-Mayer (I) ===
I become manager of the writer's department, then head of the writer's department, then assistant story editor, then associate story editor, then assistant stooge to Harry Rapf, and then finally was given my chance to make a Tim McCoy Western … I decided that … it would be just as easy to make two of them at a time as one.

— David O. Selznick

In October 1926, Selznick secured a job at Metro-Goldwyn-Mayer as a script reader for producer Harry Rapf.

After the McCoy Westerns, Selznick was assigned as assistant to producer Hunt Stromberg on the film White Shadows in the South Seas (1928). Disagreements with Stromberg and senior producer Irving Thalberg over the choice of the film's director (W. S. Van Dyke or Robert J. Flaherty) led to Selznick's termination with the company.

Release date	Title	Director	Notes
March 12, 1928	Spoilers of the West	W. S. Van Dyke	Silent
March 24, 1928	Wyoming	W. S. Van Dyke	Silent

=== Paramount Pictures ===
In response to my question as to what will happen to Schulberg, he [Lasky] said, in effect, that they would be kicking him upstairs. … One of my rows with Paramount … was my insistence that no one man could possibly personally produce more than a few pictures per year.

— David O. Selznick

In early 1928 Selznick accepted the position of assistant to producer B. P. Schulberg at Paramount Studios. The professional relationship between the two, however, eventually deteriorated after Schulberg went to Europe for several months in 1929. During his absence, studio head Jesse L. Lasky placed Selznick into Schulberg's position and decided to keep him there. Selznick remained with Paramount until his resignation in June 1931.

Selznick worked in a variety of jobs (i.e. supervisor, producer, associate producer, executive producer, or substantial contributor). The 13 films listed below were those whose production he was known to be heavily involved in. Except where noted these films are all-talking.

Release date	Title	Director(s)	Notes
August 5, 1928	Forgotten Faces	Victor Schertzinger	Silent
March 14, 1929	Chinatown Nights	William A. Wellman	Part talking
May 27, 1929	The Man I Love	William A. Wellman	
June 12, 1929	The Four Feathers	Merian C. Cooper; Ernest B. Schoedsack; Lothar Mendes	Soundtrack with music and sound effects but no spoken dialogue
August 15, 1929	The Dance of Life	John Cromwell; A. Edward Sutherland	Partly filmed in Technicolor
September 14, 1929	Fast Company	A. Edward Sutherland	
February 2, 1930	Street of Chance	John Cromwell	
March 14, 1930	Sarah and Son	Dorothy Arzner	
March 27, 1930	Honey	Wesley Ruggles	
May 1, 1930	The Texan	John Cromwell	
July 18, 1930	For the Defense	John Cromwell	
July 23, 1930	Manslaughter	George Abbott	
November 15, 1930	Laughter	Harry d'Abbadie d'Arrast	

=== RKO Pictures ===
I sold him [David Sarnoff, President of RCA, parent company at the time to RKO Radio and RKO Pathé] the idea of putting me in charge not only of production at RKO, but also his rival production unit, Pathé. In October 1931, I signed a contract to take over both and to merge them. I stayed at RKO until my contract expired in 1933. My new contract … was about to be signed when "Deac" Aylesworth became head of the company. Aylesworth insisted upon the new but still unsigned contract being changed to the extent of giving him approval of everything connected with production. I refused to accept this.

— David O. Selznick

In 1931 Selznick and director Lewis Milestone attempted to form their own production company. After several months, however, the two were unsuccessful in achieving financial backing. Milestone eventually accepted an offer to become head of production at United Artists while Selznick accepted a similar position at RKO Radio.

As Vice-president in Charge of Production, Selznick was personally involved in the 22 RKO films listed here.

Release date	Title	Director(s)	Notes
March 10, 1932	The Lost Squadron	George Archainbaud	
April 14, 1932	Symphony of Six Million	Gregory La Cava	
May 5, 1932	State's Attorney	George Archainbaud	
June 3, 1932	Westward Passage	Robert Milton	
July 9, 1932	What Price Hollywood?	George Cukor	
August 12, 1932	The Age of Consent	Gregory La Cava	
September 2, 1932	Bird of Paradise	King Vidor	
September 9, 1932	The Most Dangerous Game	Ernest B. Schoedsack; Irving Pichel	
September 16, 1932	Thirteen Women	George Archainbaud	
October 2, 1932	A Bill of Divorcement	George Cukor	Film debut of Katharine Hepburn
November 4, 1932	Little Orphan Annie	John S. Robertson	
November 20, 1932	The Conquerors	William A. Wellman	
December 4, 1932	Rockabye	George Cukor	
December 25, 1932	The Half-Naked Truth	Gregory La Cava	
December 29, 1932	The Animal Kingdom	Edward H. Griffith	
February 9, 1933	Topaze	Harry d'Abbadie d'Arrast	
February 16, 1933	The Great Jasper	J. Walter Rubin	
February 23, 1933	Our Betters	George Cukor	
March 2, 1933	King Kong	Merian C. Cooper; Ernest B. Schoedsack	Added to the National Film Registry in 1991
March 9, 1933	Christopher Strong	Dorothy Arzner	
March 23, 1933	Sweepings	John Cromwell	
May 30, 1933	The Monkey's Paw	Wesley Ruggles	

=== Metro-Goldwyn-Mayer (II) ===
After refusing to sign a new contract with RKO, Selznick returned to MGM in 1933, this time in the position as vice-president in charge of his own unit. During the next two years he personally produced 11 features for the studio before departing to form his own production company.

Release date	Title	Director	Notes
August 23, 1933	Dinner at Eight	George Cukor	
October 5, 1933	Night Flight	Clarence Brown	
October 27, 1933	Meet the Baron	Walter Lang	
December 2, 1933	Dancing Lady	Robert Z. Leonard	Film debut of Fred Astaire and an early appearance by Nelson Eddy
April 10, 1934	Viva Villa!	Jack Conway	
May 4, 1934	Manhattan Melodrama	W. S. Van Dyke	On July 22, 1934, gangster John Dillinger was gunned down by FBI agents after watching this film at the Biograph Theater in Chicago, Illinois
January 18, 1935	David Copperfield	George Cukor	
March 22, 1935	Vanessa: Her Love Story	William K. Howard	
April 18, 1935	Reckless	Victor Fleming	
August 30, 1935	Anna Karenina	Clarence Brown	
December 25, 1935	A Tale of Two Cities	Jack Conway	

=== Selznick International Pictures ===
I simply had to fulfill my ambitions of starting my own company. It had always been an obsession of mine … that there be no interference with our work; that we must have authority.

— David O. Selznick

In 1935 Selznick left MGM to form his own production company, Selznick International Pictures. He also took over the operation of Pioneer Pictures, a production company designed to produce films in Technicolor and formed by his friend and ex-associate (at RKO) Merian C. Cooper. Selznick International produced a total of 11 features, of which all but one were distributed by United Artists. Gone with the Wind was released by MGM as part of a deal with Selznick in exchange for the loan of Clark Gable in the role of Rhett Butler.

Release date	Title	Director	Notes
April 2, 1936	Little Lord Fauntleroy	John Cromwell	
November 19, 1936	The Garden of Allah	Richard Boleslawski	Filmed in Technicolor
April 21, 1937	A Star Is Born	William A. Wellman	Filmed in Technicolor
September 2, 1937	The Prisoner of Zenda	John Cromwell	Originally released in sepiatone Added to the National Film Registry in 1991.
November 25, 1937	Nothing Sacred	William A. Wellman	Filmed in Technicolor
February 17, 1938	The Adventures of Tom Sawyer	Norman Taurog	Filmed in Technicolor
November 3, 1938	The Young in Heart	Richard Wallace	
February 16, 1939	Made for Each Other	John Cromwell	
October 5, 1939	Intermezzo: A Love Story	Gregory Ratoff	First American film appearance of Ingrid Bergman
December 15, 1939	Gone with the Wind	Victor Fleming	Filmed in Technicolor; Added to the National Film Registry in 1989
March 27, 1940	Rebecca	Alfred Hitchcock	Won the Academy Award for Best Picture

=== Vanguard Films, Selznick Releasing Organization ===
Following the highly successful releases of Gone With the Wind and Rebecca, Selznick began a three-year liquidation of Selznick International Pictures in order to draw profits for himself and his outside investors. He developed and sold film projects to other producers and studios, and arranged loan outs of his contracted artists. Without outside backers he formed David O. Selznick Productions, Inc., which in 1941 became owner of one-fourth of United Artists.

Selznick established a film production company, Vanguard Films (1943–1951). The first three features for his new company were distributed by United Artists. In 1946 Selznick broke with UA over the distribution of Duel in the Sun, and founded his own distribution company, Selznick Releasing Organization.

Release date	Title	Director	Notes
May 18, 1944	Reward Unlimited	Jacques Tourneur	A one-reel short subject for the United States Public Health Service; distributed by the Office of War Information
July 20, 1944	Since You Went Away	John Cromwell	Also writer Released by United Artists
December 25, 1944	I'll Be Seeing You	William Dieterle	Released by United Artists
November 1, 1945	Spellbound	Alfred Hitchcock	One shot in color Released by United Artists
February 7, 1946	The Spiral Staircase	Robert Siodmak	Produced by Vanguard Films and RKO Pictures; distributed by RKO
December 30, 1946	Duel in the Sun	King Vidor	Filmed in Technicolor; Released by Selznick Releasing Organization
December 31, 1947	The Paradine Case	Alfred Hitchcock	Released by Selznick Releasing Organization
December 25, 1948	Portrait of Jennie	William Dieterle	Final reel tinted and final shot in Technicolor; Released by Selznick Releasing Organization

=== Final productions ===
I was tired … Additionally, it was crystal clear that the motion picture business was in for a terrible beating from television … My company financed itself with bank loans; and these loans, with interest, had been extended to a total of about $12,000,000 … as part of the plans for the liquidation of my company and its debts, we devised what has since become known as coproduction.

— David O. Selznick

In 1949 Selznick closed down his production facilities and he greatly reduced the staff of Selznick Releasing Organization. He and Jennifer Jones began traveling in Europe and were married in July 1949. For the remainder of his career he collaborated with other film producers and also made his sole venture into television.

Release date	Title	Director(s)	Notes
September 30, 1948	The Fallen Idol	Carol Reed	U.S. release November 14, 1949; Distributed in the Western Hemisphere by Selznick Releasing Organization
September 2, 1949	The Third Man	Carol Reed	U.S. release February 2, 1950; A British film co-produced by Selznick and Alexander Korda and distributed in the U.S. by Selznick Releasing Organization. Selznick also provided some minor re-editing for the U.S. release.
August 21, 1950	The Wild Heart	Michael Powell; Emeric Pressburger	U.S. release May 28, 1952; U.K. title Gone to Earth; A British Lion production made in England, co-produced with Alexander Korda. Selznick supervised reshooting (by Rouben Mamoulian) of nearly one-third of the film for its U.S. release by RKO Radio under the title The Wild Heart.
October 14, 1950	Walk Softly, Stranger	Robert Stevenson	Produced by Vanguard Films and RKO Pictures; distributed by RKO
May 27, 1954	Stazione Termini ("Terminal Station")	Vittorio De Sica	An Italian film co-produced by Selznick, who re-cut the film for its U.S. release by Columbia Pictures under the title Indiscretion of an American Wife
October 24, 1954	Light's Diamond Jubilee	King Vidor; Christian Nyby; William A. Wellman	A two-hour television special celebrating the 75th anniversary of Thomas Edison's invention of the incandescent lamp; aired simultaneously on the ABC, CBS, DuMont, and NBC television networks
December 19, 1957	A Farewell to Arms	Charles Vidor	Filmed in CinemaScope and color by DeLuxe; Produced by Selznick for Twentieth Century-Fox

== Academy Awards ==
Of the 68 features that Selznick produced 22 received a total of 82 Academy Award nominations with 21 wins. In addition to these Selznick himself was twice nominated for the Irving G. Thalberg Memorial Award. He won the second of these two nominations.

Title	Category	Nominee	Result
3rd Academy Awards—1929/30
Street of Chance	Best Writing (Adapted Screenplay)	Howard Estabrook^{I}	Nominated
4th Academy Awards—1930/31
Laughter	Best Story	Harry d'Abbadie d'Arrast, Douglas Doty, Donald Ogden Stewart	Nominated
5th Academy Awards—1931/32
What Price Hollywood?	Best Story	Adela Rogers St. Johns, Jane Murfin	Nominated
7th Academy Awards—1934
Viva Villa!	Best Picture	Metro-Goldwyn-Mayer	Nominated
Viva Villa!	Best Assistant Director	John Waters	Won
Viva Villa!	Best Sound	Douglas Shearer	Nominated
Viva Villa!	Best Writing (Adapted Screenplay)	Ben Hecht^{II}	Nominated
Manhattan Melodrama	Best Story	Arthur Caesar	Won
8th Academy Awards—1935
David Copperfield	Best Picture	Metro-Goldwyn-Mayer	Nominated
David Copperfield	Best Assistant Director	Joseph Newman^{II}	Nominated
David Copperfield	Best Film Editing	Robert J. Kern	Nominated
9th Academy Awards—1936
A Tale of Two Cities	Best Picture	Metro-Goldwyn-Mayer	Nominated
A Tale of Two Cities	Best Film Editing	Conrad A. Nervig	Nominated
The Garden of Allah	Best Assistant Director	Eric G. Stacey	Nominated
The Garden of Allah	Best Original Score	Max Steiner	Nominated
The Garden of Allah	Honorary Award	W. Howard Greene and Harold Rosson^{III}	Won
10th Academy Awards—1937
A Star Is Born	Best Picture	Selznick International	Nominated
A Star Is Born	Best Actor	Fredric March (as Norman Maine)	Nominated
A Star Is Born	Best Actress	Janet Gaynor (as Esther Blodgett / Vicki Lester)	Nominated
A Star Is Born	Best Assistant Director	Eric G. Stacey	Nominated
A Star Is Born	Best Director	William A. Wellman	Nominated
A Star Is Born	Best Story	William A. Wellman, Robert Carson	Won
A Star Is Born	Best Writing (Adapted Screenplay)	Dorothy Parker, Alan Campbell, Robert Carson	Nominated
A Star Is Born	Honorary Award	W. Howard Greene^{IV}	Won
The Prisoner of Zenda	Best Art Direction	Lyle Wheeler	Nominated
The Prisoner of Zenda	Best Original Score	Alfred Newman	Nominated
11th Academy Awards—1938
The Adventures of Tom Sawyer	Best Art Direction	Lyle Wheeler	Nominated
The Young in Heart	Best Cinematography	Leon Shamroy	Nominated
The Young in Heart	Best Original Score	Franz Waxman	Nominated
The Young in Heart	Best Scoring	Franz Waxman	Nominated
—	Irving G. Thalberg Memorial Award	David O. Selznick	Nominated^{V}
12th Academy Awards—1939
Intermezzo: A Love Story	Best Cinematography (Black-and-white)	Gregg Toland	Nominated^{VI}
Intermezzo: A Love Story	Best Scoring	Lou Forbes	Nominated
Gone with the Wind	Best Picture	Selznick International Pictures	Won
Gone with the Wind	Best Actor	Clark Gable (as Rhett Butler)	Nominated
Gone with the Wind	Best Actress	Vivien Leigh (as Scarlett O'Hara)	Won
Gone with the Wind	Best Supporting Actress	Olivia de Havilland (as Melanie Hamilton)	Nominated
Gone with the Wind	Best Supporting Actress	Hattie McDaniel (as Mammy)	Won
Gone with the Wind	Best Art Direction	Lyle Wheeler	Won
Gone with the Wind	Best Cinematography (color)	Ernest Haller, Ray Rennahan	Won
Gone with the Wind	Best Director	Victor Fleming	Won
Gone with the Wind	Best Film Editing	Hal C. Kern, James E. Newcom	Won
Gone with the Wind	Best Original Score	Max Steiner	Nominated
Gone with the Wind	Best Sound	Thomas T. Moulton	Nominated
Gone with the Wind	Best Visual Effects	John R. Cosgrove, Fred Albin, Arthur Johns	Nominated
Gone with the Wind	Best Writing (Adapted Screenplay)	Sidney Howard^{VII}	Won
Gone with the Wind	Honorary Award	William Cameron Menzies^{VIII}	Won
Gone with the Wind	Technical Achievement (Class III)	multiple^{VIX}	Won
—	Irving G. Thalberg Memorial Award	David O. Selznick	Won
13th Academy Awards—1940
Rebecca	Best Picture	Selznick International Pictures	Won
Rebecca	Best Actor	Laurence Olivier (as Maxim De Winter)	Nominated
Rebecca	Best Actress	Joan Fontaine (as Mrs. De Winter)	Nominated
Rebecca	Best Supporting Actress	Judith Anderson (as Mrs. Danvers)	Nominated
Rebecca	Academy Award for Best Art Direction (Black-and-white)	Lyle Wheeler	Nominated
Rebecca	Best Cinematography (Black-and-white)	George Barnes	Won
Rebecca	Best Director	Alfred Hitchcock	Nominated
Rebecca	Best Film Editing	Hal C. Kern	Nominated
Rebecca	Best Original Score	Franz Waxman	Nominated
Rebecca	Best Visual Effects	Jack Cosgrove (Photographic Effects); Arthur Johns (Sound Effects)	Nominated
Rebecca	Best Writing (Adapted Screenplay)	Robert E. Sherwood, Joan Harrison	Nominated
17th Academy Awards—1944
Since You Went Away	Best Picture	Selznick International Pictures	Nominated
Since You Went Away	Best Actress	Claudette Colbert (as Anne Hilton)	Nominated
Since You Went Away	Best Supporting Actor	Monty Woolley (as Colonel Smollett)	Nominated
Since You Went Away	Best Supporting Actress	Jennifer Jones (as Jane Hilton)	Nominated
Since You Went Away	Best Art Direction (Black-and-white)	Mark-Lee Kirk (Art Direction); Victor A.Gangelin (Interior Decoration)	Nominated
Since You Went Away	Best Cinematography (Black-and-white)	Stanley Cortez, Lee Garmes	Nominated
Since You Went Away	Best Film Editing	Hal C. Kern, James E. Newcom	Nominated
Since You Went Away	Best Original Score	Max Steiner	Won
Since You Went Away	Best Visual Effects	John R. Cosgrove (Photographic Effects); Arthur Johns (Sound effects)	Nominated
18th Academy Awards—1945
Spellbound	Best Picture	Selznick International Pictures	Nominated
Spellbound	Best Supporting Actor	Michael Chekhov (as Dr. Alex Brulov)	Nominated
Spellbound	Best Director	Alfred Hitchcock	Nominated
Spellbound	Best Cinematography (Black-and-white)	George Barnes	Nominated
Spellbound	Best Original Score	Miklos Rozsa	Won
Spellbound	Best Visual Effects	Jack Cosgrove	Nominated
19th Academy Awards—1946
Duel in the Sun	Best Actress	Jennifer Jones (as Pearl Chavez)	Nominated
Duel in the Sun	Best Supporting Actress	Lillian Gish (as Belle McCanles)	Nominated
20th Academy Awards—1947
The Paradine Case	Best Supporting Actress	Ethel Barrymore (as Lady Sophie Horfield)	Nominated
21st Academy Awards—1948
Portrait of Jennie	Best Cinematography (Black-and-white)	Joseph H. August	Nominated
Portrait of Jennie	Best Visual Effects	Paul Eagler, Joseph McMillan Johnson, Russell Shearman, Clarence Slifer (Special Visual Effects); Charles L. Freeman, James G. Stewart (Special Audible Effects)	Won
23rd Academy Awards—1950
The Third Man	Best Cinematography (Black-and-white)	Robert Krasker	Won
The Third Man	Best Director	Carol Reed	Nominated
The Third Man	Best Film Editing	Oswald Hafenrichter	Nominated
27th Academy Awards—1954
Indiscretion of an American Wife	Best Costume Design (Black-and-white)	Christian Dior	Nominated
Notes:^IFor the Third Academy Awards no certificates of nomination were given out in this category, only the titles of the nominated films and their companies were listed. When the winners were revealed, only the names of the individuals involved with the winning achievements were announced.^IINamed in third place.^III"For the color cinematography of the Selznick International Production, The Garden of Allah."^IV"For the color photography of A Star Is Born." (This award was recommended by a committee of leading cinematographers after viewing all the color pictures made during the year.)^VThis is the only year that nominations were announced for the Thalberg award.^VIThis was not an official nomination. The title was on a preliminary list of submissions/nominees from the studios from which the two official nominees (Stagecoach and Wuthering Heights) would be selected.^VIIAwarded posthumously^VIII"For outstanding achievement in the use of color for the enhancement of dramatic mood in the production of Gone with the Wind."^VIX"For important contributions in cooperative development of new improved process Projection Equipment: F. R. Abbott, Haller Belt, Alan Cook and The Bausch & Lomb Optical Company For Faster Projection Lenses; The Mitchell Camera Company for a new type process Projection Head; Mole-Richardson Company for a new type automatically controlled projection arc lamp; Charles Handley, David Joy and the National Carbon Company for improved and more stable high-intensity carbons; Winton C. Hoch and the Technicolor Motion Picture Corp. for an auxiliary optical system; Don Musgrave and Selznick International Pictures, Inc. for pioneering in the use of coordinated equipment in the production, Gone with the Wind."
