= Vanguard Films =

Vanguard Films, Inc. was an American film production company, established by producer David O. Selznick in 1943, after the dissolution of Selznick International Pictures. The company's president was Daniel T. O'Shea; Dore Schary was the head of production. The company was liquidated in 1951.

== History ==
After the dissolution of Selznick International Pictures, David O. Selznick established Vanguard Films, Inc., in 1943 and Selznick Releasing Organization in 1946. Vanguard was created to continue his productions, while the Selznick Releasing Organization was made to distribute output by Vanguard. Previously, Vanguard released through United Artists, of which Vanguard owned one-third of its stock. As with Selznick International, Vanguard was located at the RKO studio.

Vanguard Films took over the three films still in production—Since You Went Away, I'll Be Seeing You and Hitchcock's Spellbound—and delivered them to the distributor United Artists, thus fulfilling Selznick's contract with UA.

After the agreement with United Artists was completed, Vanguard films were distributed by RKO Radio Pictures or Selznick Releasing Organization. Notable films among those are Hitchcock's The Paradine Case and King Vidor's Duel in the Sun.

Vanguard Films was dissolved in 1951.

== Filmography ==
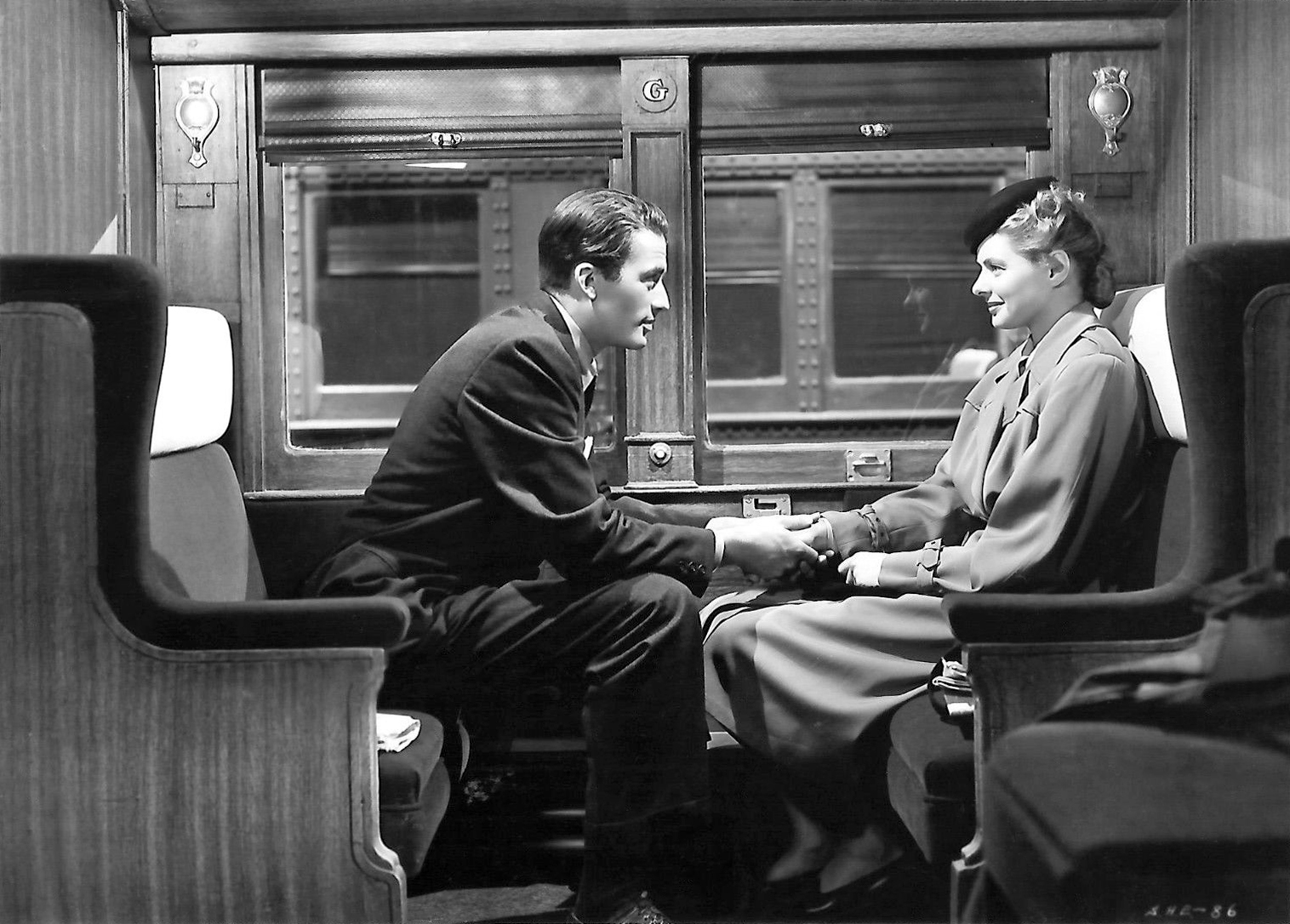
Gregory Peck and Ingrid Bergman in Spellbound (1945)

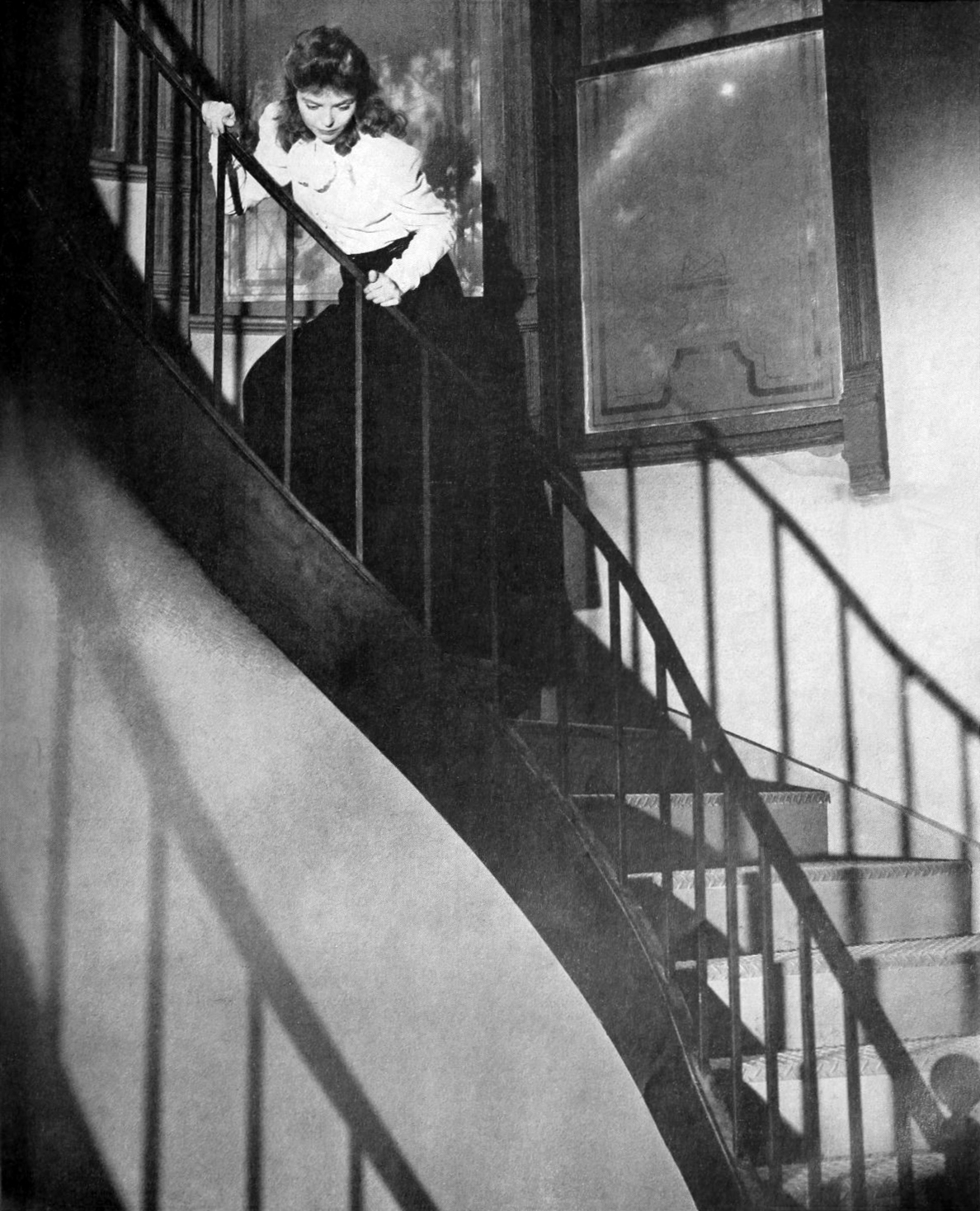
Dorothy McGuire in The Spiral Staircase (1946)

Release date	Title	Notes
May 18, 1944	Reward Unlimited	Short film distributed by the Office of War Information
July 20, 1944	Since You Went Away	Produced with Selznick International Pictures; distributed by United Artists
November 1944	The Fighting Generation	Short film produced with Selznick International Pictures and distributed by RKO Pictures, promoting war bond sales during the Sixth War Loan Drive (November 2 – December 16, 1944)
January 5, 1945	I'll Be Seeing You	Produced with Selznick International Pictures; distributed by United Artists
December 28, 1945	Spellbound	Produced with Selznick International Pictures; distributed by United Artists
February 7, 1946	The Spiral Staircase	Produced with RKO Pictures; distributed by RKO
May 8, 1947	Duel in the Sun	Distributed by Selznick Releasing Organization
January 8, 1948	The Paradine Case	Distributed by Selznick Releasing Organization
December 24, 1948	Portrait of Jennie	Distributed by Selznick Releasing Organization
October 14, 1950	Walk Softly, Stranger	Produced with RKO Pictures; distributed by RKO
May 28, 1952	The Wild Heart	Produced with London Films, distributed November 6, 1950, by British Lion Films, titled Gone to Earth; Reshot and re-edited for Western Hemisphere release, distributed by RKO
December 14, 1957	A Farewell to Arms	Last Selznick film. Produced by Selznick Releasing Organization and Distributed by 20th Century Fox

== Library ==
Like most Selznick productions, films made by Vanguard are now owned by The Walt Disney Company through ABC.

== See also ==
- Selznick International Pictures
- David O. Selznick filmography
