= The Golden Fleecing (film) =

1940 film

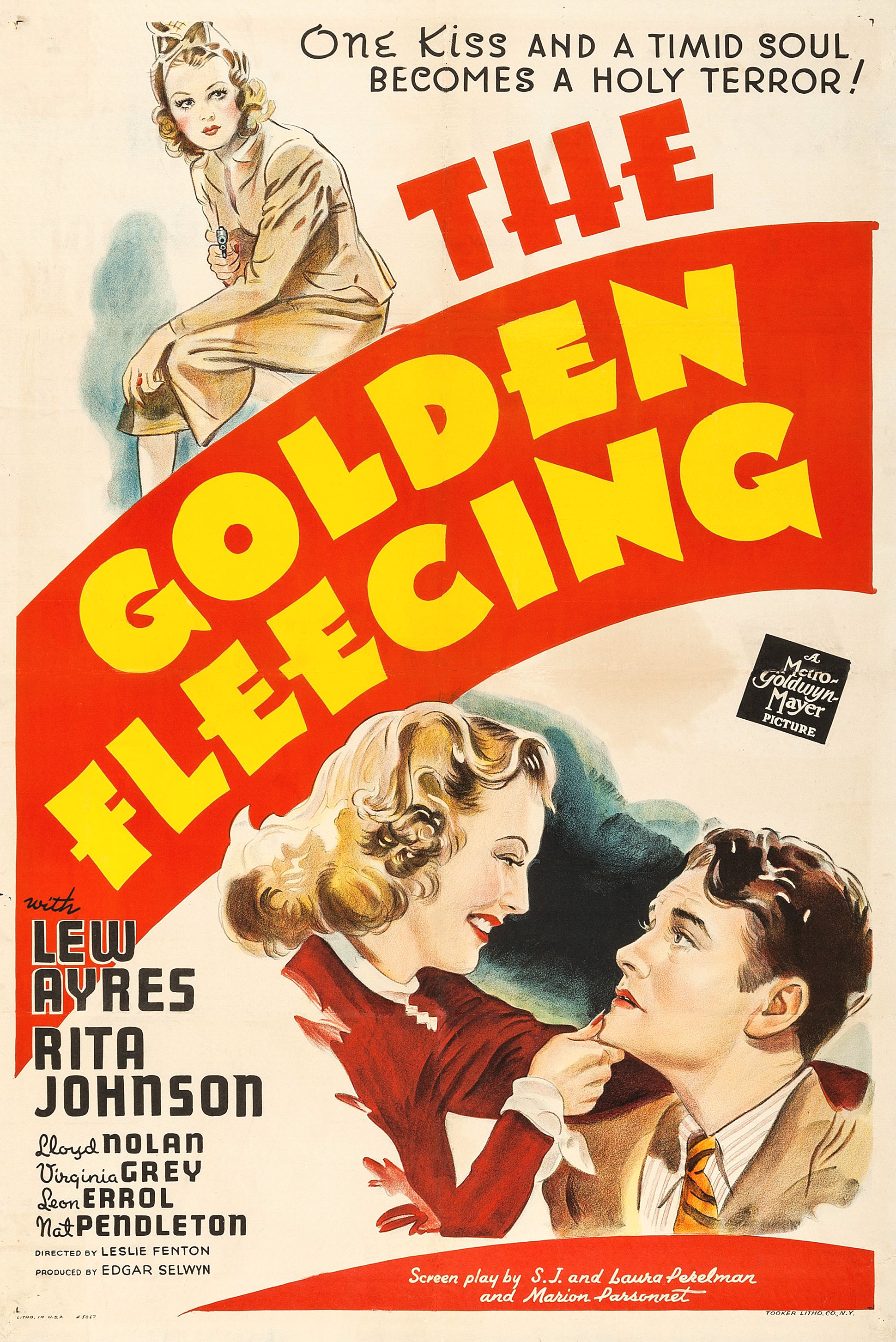
- Theatrical release poster
- Directed by: Leslie Fenton
- Screenplay by: S. J. Perelman; Laura Perelman; Marion Parsonnet
- Story by: Lynn Root; John Fante; Frank Fenton
- Produced by: Edgar Selwyn
- Starring: Lew Ayres; Rita Johnson; Lloyd Nolan; Virginia Grey; Leon Errol; Nat Pendleton
- Cinematography: Leonard Smith
- Edited by: Conrad A. Nervig
- Music by: David Snell
- Production company: Metro-Goldwyn-Mayer
- Distributed by: Loew's Inc.
- Release date: August 16, 1940
- Running time: 68 minutes
- Country: United States
- Language: English

The Golden Fleecing is a 1940 American comedy film directed by Leslie Fenton and written by S. J. Perelman, Laura Perelman and Marion Parsonnet. The film stars Lew Ayres, Rita Johnson, Lloyd Nolan, Virginia Grey, Leon Errol and Nat Pendleton. The film was released on August 16, 1940, by Metro-Goldwyn-Mayer.

== Plot ==
Mary Blake insists that mild-mannered insurance salesman Henry Twinkle demand a raise if they intend to get married. Henry earns praise and a raise from his boss when he sells a valuable policy to a man named Gus Fender.

Fender turns out to be a gangster with a huge reward for anyone who brings him in, dead or alive. Henry's furious boss orders him to personally assure Fender does not end up dead. Fender and his moll, Lila Hanley, however, dupe Henry into a scheme in which they will end up with the reward money themselves. Henry foolishly tries to pay them with a check.

Mary, who quit her job after Henry's raise, bemoans his acceptance of a worthless stock and even sues him to get back money she feels she's got coming. The stock ends up valuable after all and Henry ends up with $150,000 in hand. He naively gives Fender a fistful of cash, which then accidentally gets burned into ashes.

== Cast ==
- Lew Ayres as Henry Twinkle
- Rita Johnson as Mary Blake
- Lloyd Nolan as Gus Fender
- Virginia Grey as Lila Hanley
- Leon Errol as Uncle Waldo Burke
- Nat Pendleton as 'Fatso' Werner
- George Lessey as Buckley Sloan
- Richard Carle as Pattington
- Ralph Byrd as Larry Kelly
- Marc Lawrence as 'Happy' Dugan
- Thurston Hall as Charles Engel
- James Burke as Sibley
- Spencer Charters as Justice of Peace
- William Demarest as Swallow
- Ray Walker as Reporter
