= Marion Parsonnet =

American screenwriter

- Born: February 21, 1905; Newark, New Jersey, United States
- Died: December 7, 1960 (aged 55); Los Angeles, California, United States
- Occupations: Director; producer; screenwriter
- Years active: 1937–1960 (film)

Marion Parsonnet (1905–1960) was an American screenwriter and producer of film and television.

== Selected filmography ==
- Beg, Borrow or Steal (1937)
- Between Two Women (1937)
- The Thirteenth Chair (1937)
- Love Is a Headache (1938)
- Miracles for Sale (1939)
- These Glamour Girls (1939)
- The Golden Fleecing (1940)
- Gallant Sons (1940)
- Washington Melodrama (1941)
- Dangerously They Live (1941)
- Blonde Inspiration (1941)
- Cover Girl (1944)
- I'll Be Seeing You (1944)
- Dangerous Partners (1945)
- My Forbidden Past (1951)
- Run for the Hills (1953)
- Uncle Vanya (1957)

== Bibliography ==
- Dick, Bernard F. The Merchant Prince of Poverty Row: Harry Cohn of Columbia Pictures. University Press of Kentucky, 2015.
- Irvin, Richard. Pioneers of "B" Television: Independent Producers, Series and Pilots of the 1950s. McFarland, 2022.
