= A Farewell to Arms (1957 film) =

1957 American drama film by Charles Vidor

- Theatrical release poster
- Directed by: Charles Vidor
- Screenplay by: Ben Hecht
- Based on: A Farewell to Arms; 1929 novel by: Ernest Hemingway 1930 play; Laurence Stallings
- Produced by: David O. Selznick
- Starring: Rock Hudson; Jennifer Jones; Vittorio De Sica; Elaine Stritch
- Narrated by: Rock Hudson
- Cinematography: Oswald Morris
- Edited by: John M. Foley; Gerard Wilson
- Music by: Mario Nascimbene
- Production company: The Selznick Company
- Distributed by: 20th Century Fox
- Release date: December 14, 1957 (United States)
- Running time: 152 minutes
- Country: United States
- Language: English
- Budget: $4,100,000; $4.2 million or $4,353,000
- Box office: $20 million (worldwide)

A Farewell to Arms is a 1957 American epic war drama film directed by Charles Vidor. The last film produced by David O. Selznick, it stars Rock Hudson, Jennifer Jones, Vittorio De Sica, and Elaine Stritch. The screenplay by Ben Hecht, based in part on a 1930 play by Laurence Stallings, was the second feature film adaptation of Ernest Hemingway's 1929 semiautobiographical novel of the same name, after the 1932 pre-Code version starring Gary Cooper and Helen Hayes.

== Plot ==
Frederick Henry is an American officer serving in an ambulance unit for the Italian Army during World War I. While recovering from a wound in a British base hospital in northern Italy, he is treated by nurse Catherine Barkley, and they engage in an affair. Frederick's friend, the doctor, convinces the army that Frederick's knee is more severely wounded than it actually is. Frederick and Catherine continue their romance but do not marry.

Catherine discovers that she is pregnant, but after sneaking alcohol into the hospital for Frederick, head nurse Miss Van Campen discovers the duplicity and separates them. She informs Frederick's superiors that he has fully recovered from his wounds and is ready for active duty. During their separation, Catherine believes that Frederick has abandoned her.

Following the Battle of Caporetto, Frederick and his close friend Major Alessandro Rinaldi are among the dispirited and retreating Italian army. Along the path, several people die or are left behind because of exhaustion. Rinaldi's defeatist comments land him before a drumhead court-martial, falsely accused as a German infiltrator, and he is executed by firing squad. When Frederick salutes incorrectly, the judge becomes suspicious that he is also an infiltrator. Frederick flees, jumping into the river.

Wanted by the Italian authorities, Frederick evades capture and finds Catherine. They flee to Milan to hide at a lake on the Swiss border. Fearing arrest by the police, Catherine persuades Frederick to flee to Switzerland by rowboat. Claiming to be tourists trying to evade the war, they are allowed to remain in neutral Switzerland. Catherine's pregnancy progresses and all appears well, but she has difficulty during childbirth and a Caesarean section is performed. Their child is stillborn, and Catherine dies shortly afterward of a hemorrhage. Frederick leaves, shocked, and wanders the empty streets.

== Cast ==
- Rock Hudson as Frederick Henry
- Jennifer Jones as Catherine Barkley
- Vittorio De Sica as Major Alessandro Rinaldi
- Oskar Homolka as Dr. Emerich
- Mercedes McCambridge as Miss Van Campen
- Elaine Stritch as Helen Ferguson
- Kurt Kasznar as Bonello
- Victor Francen as Colonel Valentini
- Franco Interlenghi as Aymo
- Leopoldo Trieste as Passini
- José Nieto as Major Stampi (as Jose Nieto)
- Georges Bréhat as Captain Bassi (as Georges Brehat)
- Johanna Hofer as Mrs. Zimmerman
- Eduard Linkers as Lieutenant Zimmerman
- Eva Kotthaus as Delivery Room Nurse
- Alberto Sordi as Father Galli
- Joan Shawlee as Blonde Nurse

== Production ==
David O. Selznick wanted for many years to film the Hemingway novel, but Warner Bros. owned the property and refused to sell it to him. When Warner Bros. planned to remake a A Star Is Born, for which Selznick owned the foreign rights. he traded the rights to the studio in exchange for those to A Farewell to Arms. It was to be Selznick's first film in four years.

Selznick initially hired director John Huston for the project, but Huston tinkered with the script and spent an inordinate amount of time on preproduction preparations. When Selznick expressed his concerns, Huston withdrew from the project. Charles Vidor replaced Huston, but Selznick's relationship with Vidor was acrimonious as well. During the course of production, Selznick sent more than 10,000 memos.

The film was shot on location in the Italian Alps, Venzone in the Province of Udine in the region of Friuli-Venezia Giulia, Lazio and Rome. It was budgeted at more than $4 million. Selznick's wife Jennifer Jones was cast in the lead role.

According to Carlos Baker's 1969 biography Ernest Hemingway: A Life Story, Hemingway was informed by Selznick that he would receive a $50,000 bonus from the film's profits. Unhappy with Selznick's decision to cast his nearly 40-year-old wife as a character intended to be in her early 20s, he replied: "If, by some chance your movie, which features the 38-year-old Mrs. Selznick as 24-year-old Catherine Barkley, does succeed in earning $50,000, I suggest that you take all of that money down to the local bank, have it converted to nickels, and then shove them up your ass until they come out your mouth." A. E. Hotchner also referred to this anecdote in his 1966 book Papa Hemingway: A Personal Memoir.

After making the film, Selznick left the industry, producing no other films.

== Release ==
The film premiered at Grauman's Chinese Theatre in Los Angeles on December 18, 1957. It also opened at seven other Los Angeles theaters and 44 theaters throughout California before its release was expanded in 1958. The film grossed $87,000 in its opening week in Los Angeles from eight theaters. It earned an estimated $5 million in theatrical rentals in the United States and Canada and, by the end of 1958, had worldwide rentals of $6.9 million. Fox made a profit from the film, but Selznick did not recover his costs.

== Reception ==
=== Critical response ===
In a contemporary review in The New York Times, critic Bosley Crowther lamented that the film lacked "that all-important awareness of the inescapable presence and pressure of war" and wrote: "Mr. Selznick's picture is a tedious account of a love affair between two persons who are strangely insistent upon keeping it informal—except, as they carefully explain, in the eyes of God. ... Throughout, the ominous note of doom is missing, so that the sudden terminal tragedy, when it occurs, seems more a sheer mistake in obstetrics than an inevitable irony in these people's lives. ... The show of devotion between two people is intensely acted, not realized. It is questionable, indeed, whether Mr. Hudson and Miss Jones have the right personalities for these roles."

Critic Mae Tinee of the Chicago Tribune wrote: "The quality of the film varies. Sometimes the action has great impact, occasionally it labors. I think the film could have been cut to advantage, some of the love scenes seemed coy and prolonged and the repetitious Hemingway dialogue a drag on the plot."

The New York Herald Tribune was vitriolic in its review of the film.

The review aggregator Rotten Tomatoes reported a dismal approval rating of 8%, with an average score of 3.9/10, based on 13 reviews.

== Awards ==
Vittorio De Sica was nominated for the Academy Award for Best Supporting Actor but lost to Red Buttons for Sayonara.

== See also ==
- List of American films of 1957
