= Since You Went Away =

1944 film by John Cromwell

- Theatrical release poster
- Directed by: John Cromwell
- Screenplay by: David O. Selznick
- Based on: Since You Went Away: Letters to a Soldier from His Wife by Margaret Buell Wilder
- Produced by: David O. Selznick
- Starring: Claudette Colbert; Jennifer Jones; Joseph Cotten; Shirley Temple; Monty Woolley; Lionel Barrymore; Robert Walker
- Cinematography: Stanley Cortez; Lee Garmes
- Edited by: Hal C. Kern (supervising film editor); James E. Newcom (associate film editor); John D. Faure; Arthur Fellows; Wayland M. Hendry (uncredited)
- Music by: Max Steiner
- Production companies: Selznick International Pictures; Vanguard Films
- Distributed by: United Artists
- Release date: July 20, 1944 (USA)
- Running time: 177 minutes
- Country: United States
- Language: English
- Budget: $3,257,000
- Box office: $7 million+

Since You Went Away is a 1944 American epic drama film directed by John Cromwell for Selznick International Pictures and distributed by United Artists. It is an epic about the US home front during World War II that was adapted and produced by David O. Selznick from the 1943 novel Since You Went Away: Letters to a Soldier from His Wife by Margaret Buell Wilder. The music score was by Max Steiner, and the cinematography by Stanley Cortez, Lee Garmes, George Barnes (uncredited), and Robert Bruce (uncredited).

The film is set in a mid-sized American town, where people with loved ones in the armed forces try to cope with their changed circumstances and make their own contributions to the war effort. The town is near a military base, and some of the characters are troops serving Stateside.

Though sentimental in places, Since You Went Away is somber at times about the effects of war on ordinary people. Some characters on the home front are dealing with grief, loneliness, or fear for the future. Wounded and disabled troops are shown in the hospital scenes.

== Plot ==
"This is a story of the Unconquerable Fortress: the American Home...1943" In January 1943, Anne Hilton is an upper-middle-class housewife living in a Midwestern town near a military base with her two teenage daughters, Jane and Bridget ("Brig"). Anne's beloved husband Tim Hilton has volunteered for U.S. Army service in World War II. Anne has just returned from seeing her husband off to Camp Claiborne, and she and her daughters must adjust to Tim's absence and make other sacrifices for the war effort, including food rationing; planting a victory garden; giving up the services of their loyal maid Fidelia who nevertheless offers to continue working part-time for the Hiltons while foregoing wages; and taking in a boarder, the curmudgeonly retired Colonel William Smollett. When the Hiltons travel by train in a failed attempt to see Tim one last time before he ships out, they encounter or travel with many other people whose lives have been affected by the war, and they end up not getting to see Tim because their train is delayed to allow a defense supply train to go through first. In contrast, the Hiltons' socialite neighbor Emily Hawkins complains about the inconveniences caused by the war and engages in unsupportive behaviors such as hoarding food and criticizing the Hiltons' efforts.

The Colonel has a strained relationship with his young grandson, Bill Smollett, because Bill "was kicked out" of West Point and is now serving in the U.S. Army as a mere corporal rather than an officer. An old friend of Anne and Tim's, U.S. Navy Lieutenant Tony Willett, also visits the Hiltons while awaiting his orders. Bill quickly falls for Jane, who has a crush on Tony, who in turn has long been attracted to Anne. However, after Tony leaves, Bill and Jane's relationship slowly develops and they fall in love. They become engaged, but Bill convinces Jane to wait until after the war to get married. Bill finally is sent overseas and Jane tearfully runs after his departing train to tell him goodbye. The Colonel, who under his gruff exterior really does care about his grandson, conveys his good wishes to Bill via Anne, but arrives too late to say goodbye in person.

Jane is determined to do more for the war effort and begins volunteering as a nurses' aide at the nearby military hospital, where returning veterans with physical and mental injuries are sent to recover. The family learns via telegram that Tim Hilton is missing in action in the Southwest Pacific. Shortly after Bill's departure, the Hiltons receive word that he was killed in action at Salerno. The Hiltons and the Colonel grieve together for Bill. Jane and Anne finally tell off Emily after she suggests that it is unseemly for Jane to volunteer at the hospital, and Anne decides she herself must do more to help and trains as a welder for defense work at the shipyard.

Tony returns on leave and talks to Anne about his feelings for her, but she believes that he only keeps her as a romantic ideal because she is married to his friend Tim and therefore unattainable. Anne and Tony decide to leave things as they are and remain friends. On Christmas Eve, Fidelia places gifts under the tree that Tim had given her months earlier to leave for his family, and Anne is moved to tears. Anne then gets a cablegram by telephone informing her that Tim is safe and is coming home, and she and her daughters joyfully embrace. "Be of good courage, and He shall strengthen your heart, all ye that hope in the Lord."

== Cast ==
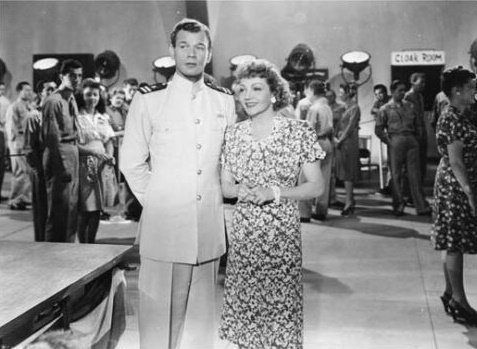
Joseph Cotten and Claudette Colbert in Since You Went Away

Jennifer Jones and Robert Walker played young sweethearts in the film, but in real life they were married at the time and going through a break-up. They divorced not long after the film was completed (Jones married Selznick after his marriage to Irene Mayer Selznick ended).

- Claudette Colbert as Mrs. Anne Hilton
- Jennifer Jones as Jane Deborah Hilton
- Joseph Cotten as Lieutenant Commander Tony Willett
- Shirley Temple as Bridget 'Brig' Hilton
- Monty Woolley as Colonel William G. Smollett
- Lionel Barrymore as Clergyman
- Robert Walker as Corporal William G. 'Bill' Smollett II
- Hattie McDaniel as Fidelia
- Agnes Moorehead as Mrs. Emily Hawkins
- Nazimova as Zofia Koslowska
- Albert Basserman as Dr. Sigmund Gottlieb Golden
- Gordon Oliver as Marine Officer seeking room
- Keenan Wynn as Lieutenant Solomon
- Guy Madison as Sailor Harold E. Smith
- Craig Stevens as Danny Williams
- Lloyd Corrigan as Mr. Mahoney, the Grocer
- Jackie Moran as Johnny Mahoney

Uncredited

- Wallis Clark as Man at Cocktail Lounge
- George Chandler as Taxi Driver
- Dorothy Dandridge as Black Officer's Wife in railway station
- Warren Hymer as Convalescing Soldier asking for Tutti Frutti ice-cream
- Rhonda Fleming as Susie Fleming, girl at dance
- Byron Foulger as High School Principal
- Andrew V. McLaglen as Former plowboy
- Edwin Maxwell as Businessman in Cocktail Lounge
- Terry Moore as Refugee Child on train
- Adeline De Walt Reynolds as a Grandmother on train
- Ruth Roman as Envious Girl in Train Station
- Marilyn Hare as Merchant Marine's Wife
- Janelle Johnson minor role
- Butterfly McQueen as WAC Sergeant (deleted scene)
- Neil Hamilton as Tim Hilton (husband) (family photos and deleted scene)

== Reception ==
According to The New York Times critic Bosley Crowther, Since You Went Away features a script with an "excess of exhausting emotional detail"; Crowther was impressed with the performances, but had issues with the film as a whole:

As the mother and center of the family, Claudette Colbert gives an excellent show of gallantly self-contained emotion, and Jennifer Jones is surpassingly sweet as a well-bred American daughter in the first bloom of womanhood and love. Robert Walker is uncommonly appealing as the young soldier whom she tragically adores, and Shirley Temple, now grown to "teen-age freshness", is pert as the young sister. Monty Woolley makes a full-blown character of the man who comes to lodge; Joseph Cotten is droll as the Navy playboy, and Hattie McDaniel does an Andy-act quite well... No doubt, this would have been a sharper picture if Mr. Selznick had played it in much less time, and it would have been considerably more significant had he kept it somewhat closer to average means. Two hours and fifty-one minutes is a lot of time to harp upon one well-known theme -lonesomeness and anxiety. And that is all this picture really does.

Literary critic Manny Farber, writing in The New Republic registers this appraisal:

Since You Went Away holds religiously to a philosophy consisting in the ideas that only happy, virtuous or funny things happen in the American home, that only the pretty and the brave live there, that any complications should be more than balanced by happy rewards…As a whole, the picture is doughy and inconsequential as the bread you get in the grocery store…For its length, this is as ineffectual a movie as I ever saw.”

In The Nation in 1944, critic James Agee wrote, "It is clear that Mr. Selznick thinks of it as the American home and that the Hiltons, who live in it, are supposed to be the American family. What he has managed ... is an immense improvement on a Ladies' Home Journal story so sticky I couldn't get through it, which has, as he finishes it, something of the charm of an updated and cellophaned Little Women. Since You Went Away is not a good film, by any standards I care for, and I would not dare to recommend it to anyone who cares exclusively for good films. But ... I always enjoy and am interested in Mr. Selznick's particular blend of serious talent with smart, safe showmanship ... this lively but aesthetically self-defeating, peculiar yet imitable style ... "

The movie was successful and earned $4,950,000 in North American rentals during its theatrical release, and over $7 million in rentals overall.

== Accolades ==
Award	Category	Nominee	Result
Academy Awards	Best Picture	David O. Selznick	Nominated
Academy Awards	Best Actress	Claudette Colbert	Nominated
Academy Awards	Best Supporting Actor	Monty Woolley	Nominated
Academy Awards	Best Supporting Actress	Jennifer Jones	Nominated
Academy Awards	Best Production Design	Mark-Lee Kirk, Victor A. Gangelin	Nominated
Academy Awards	Best Cinematography	Stanley Cortez, Lee Garmes	Nominated
Academy Awards	Best Film Editing	Hal C. Kern, James E. Newcom	Nominated
Academy Awards	Best Original Score	Max Steiner	Won
Academy Awards	Best Visual Effects	Jack Cosgrove, Arthur Johns	Nominated

== Home media ==
Since You Went Away was released to DVD by MGM Home Video on October 19, 2004, in a Region 1 fullscreened DVD. It was later released on Blu-ray by Kino Classics on November 21, 2017.

== In popular culture ==
The farewell scene between Jane Hilton (Jones) and Bill Smollett (Walker) at the railway station was parodied in the film Airplane! (1980).

== Sources ==
- Farber, Manny. 2009. Farber on Film: The Complete Film Writings of Manny Farber. Edited by Robert Polito. Library of America. ISBN 978-1-59853-050-6
