= Walk Softly, Stranger =

1950 film by Robert Stevenson

- Theatrical release poster
- Directed by: Robert Stevenson
- Screenplay by: Frank Fenton
- Story by: Manny Seff; Paul Yawitz
- Produced by: Robert Sparks
- Starring: Joseph Cotten; Alida Valli; Spring Byington; Paul Stewart; Jack Paar
- Cinematography: Harry J. Wild
- Edited by: Frederic Knudtson
- Music by: Frederick Hollander
- Production company: Vanguard Films
- Distributed by: RKO Radio Pictures
- Release dates: October 12, 1950 (Los Angeles); October 14, 1950 (New York)
- Running time: 81 minutes
- Country: United States
- Language: English

Walk Softly, Stranger is a 1950 American romantic drama film starring Joseph Cotten and Alida Valli and directed by Robert Stevenson. Also regarded by some as a film noir or crime film, it tells the story of a small-time crook on the run who is reformed by the love of a disabled woman.

The film's supporting cast features Spring Byington, Paul Stewart, Jack Paar and John McIntire.

== Plot ==
When Chris Hale arrives at the doorstep of his childhood Ohio home, the current resident, widow Mrs. Brentman, invites him to enter. Chris, who is unemployed, accepts Mrs. Brentman's offer of a room and takes a job in the shipping department of the Corelli shoe factory. He meets Elaine Corelli, his boss's beautiful but paralyzed daughter. Speaking of the days when he used to deliver newspapers to her door and adored her from afar, Chris amuses and fascinates her. The next day, Chris is summoned to see Elaine's father A. J., who tells him that Elaine was so taken with him that she asked that he be given a better job in sales. Chris declines the offer but assures Corelli, who is devoted to his daughter, that he will explain his decision to Elaine. Chris, a confessed gambler and drifter, offers Elaine a vague explanation.

The next morning, Chris flies to another city for a rendezvous with petty criminal Whitey Lake, who calls him Steve. Chris and Whitey rob gambling-house owner Bowen of $200,000 in cash, knowing that the crime will never be reported. After splitting the money and advising Whitey to disappear, Chris returns to Ohio and takes Elaine to a working-class nightclub where she becomes despondent watching him dance with another girl. Sure that Chris will resent her paralysis, Elaine suddenly departs to Florida. When she returns at Christmas, Chris resumes his pursuit, and by New Year's Eve, they are deeply in love.

Whitey appears, broke and scared. Chris insists that Whitey, who is being chased by Bowen, stay confined to Mrs. Brentman's house until he can devise an escape plan. Whitey ransacks Chris's room in search of Chris' share of the stolen money. When he learns that Chris is sending Mrs. Brentman to see her son's grave at Arlington National Cemetery, Whitey becomes convinced that Chris intends to kill him during her absence.

Driving home after delivering Mrs. Brentman to the airport, Chris realizes that he is being followed by two men. He confesses the truth to Elaine, who advises him to return the money. Elaine also reveals that she has known all along that he had been lying about his past, because Chris claimed to have admired her as a young girl even though she had not lived there as a child.

When Chris returns to Mrs. Brentman's house, it is apparent that Whitey has been killed and the money reclaimed. The killers take Chris to see Bowen, who knows that Chris has been scheming to rob the Corellis and wants a piece of the action. During a wild struggle in Bowen's car, Bowen shoots Chris and the car crashes.

Chris survives and is treated in the prison wing of the hospital. When he has sufficiently recuperated and is about to be transferred to prison, Elaine visits and vows to wait until his release, when he will finally need her in the way that she has always needed him.

== Cast ==
- Joseph Cotten as Chris Hale
- Alida Valli as Elaine Corelli
- Spring Byington as Mrs. Brentman
- Paul Stewart as Whitey Lake
- Jack Paar as Ray Healy
- John McIntire as Morgan
- Howard Petrie as Bowen
- Jeff Donnell as Gwen

== Production ==
The working title for the film was Weep No More, and RKO Pictures intended for Cary Grant to star under the direction of Alfred Hitchcock.

The film marks the final RKO Pictures credit for producer Dore Schary, who resigned from the studio soon after the film's completion after clashing with RKO's new owner Howard Hughes. Filming ended in June 1948, but Hughes shelved the picture indefinitely so that changes could be made, especially to its ending. When the pairing of Joseph Cotten and Alida Valli earned positive reviews for their starring performances in The Third Man (1949), Hughes resurrected Walk Softly, Stranger and released it in 1950 in an effort to capitalize on the stars' success.

== Reception ==
In a contemporary review for The New York Times, critic Bosley Crowther wrote: "The grudging romance which Frank Fenton has contrived in his script has an interesting novelty about it, and it is well directed by Robert Stevenson and tartly played. The possibility of fireworks between two complicated characters, both of them harboring some strange malice, looks to be better than fair. But then Mr. Fenton surrenders, to a cliché as old as the screen. The fellow turns out to be a criminal, holed-up for a precautionary spell. And the climax is just a running battle with his enemies who come to get him, that is all. ... [T]he story deflates in the middle. 'Walk Softly, Stranger' doesn't carry a big stick."

Critic Edwin Schallert of the Los Angeles Times wrote: "The picture easily deserves an 'A' for its avoidance of crude melodrama, for scenes that are often nicely tinged with humor, and excellent and cultivated performances by its two principal players. ... 'Walk Softly, Stranger' falls short of the finest fulfillment that might be imagined for the picture. But its values are undeniable, and the fact that it avoids theatricalism and melodrama is enormously to its credit."

The film lost an estimated $775,000, making it one of RKO's greatest flops of the year.
