= Selznick International Pictures =

Defunct American film studio

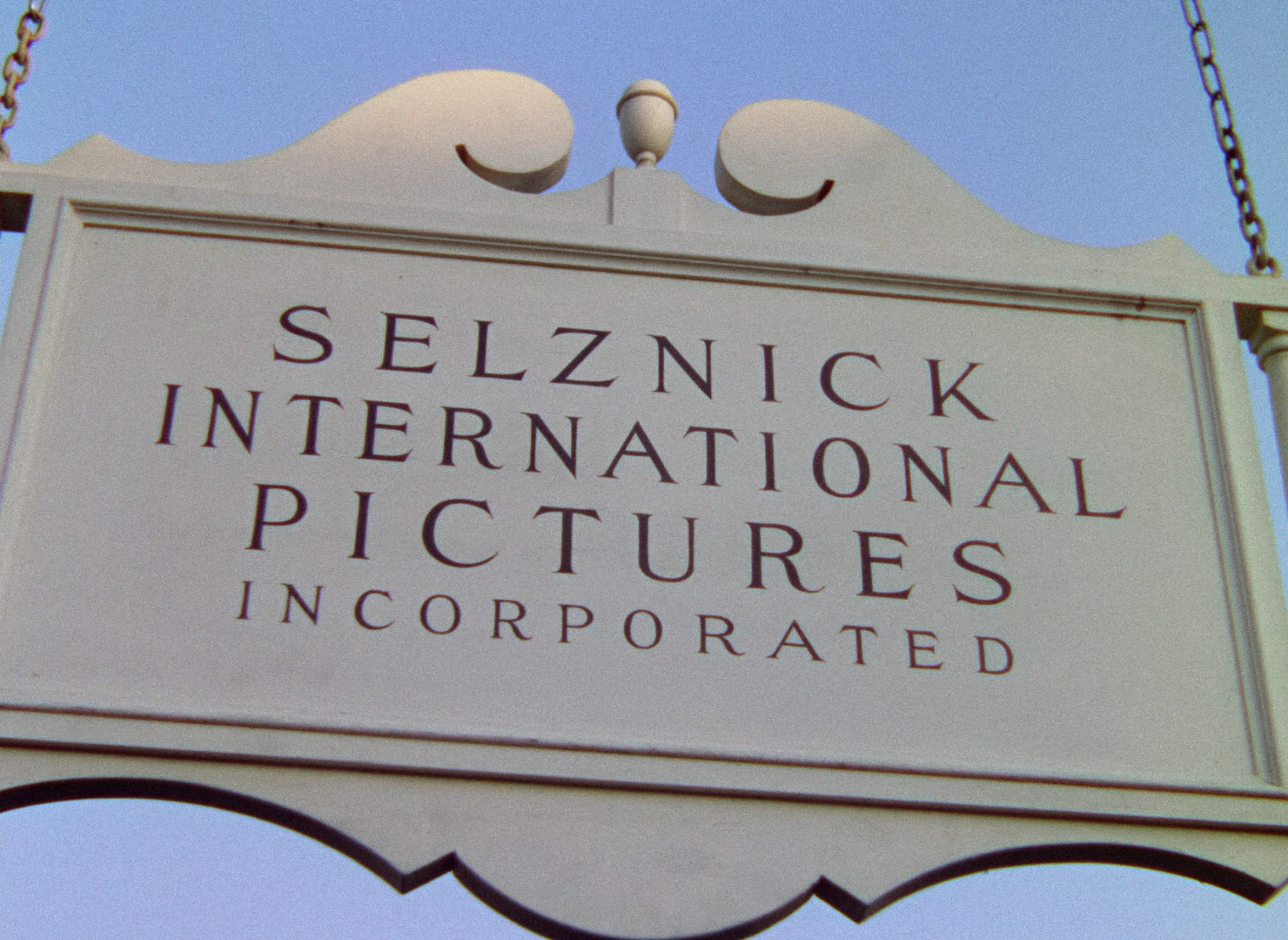
Selznick International Pictures title screen that begins A Star Is Born (1937)

Selznick International Pictures was a Hollywood motion picture studio created by David O. Selznick in 1935, and dissolved in 1943. In its short existence the independent studio produced two films that received the Academy Award for Best Picture—Gone with the Wind (1939) and Rebecca (1940)—and three that were nominated, A Star Is Born (1937), Since You Went Away (1944) and Spellbound (1945).

== Company history ==
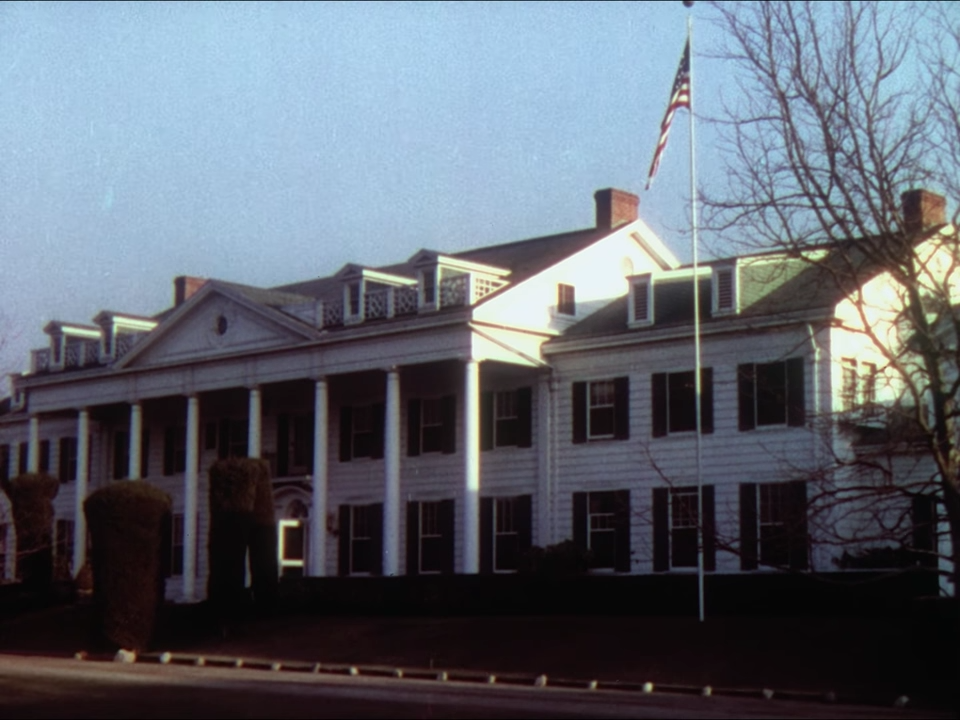
The facade of the Selznick International Pictures administration building in Culver City became the trademark of the studio.

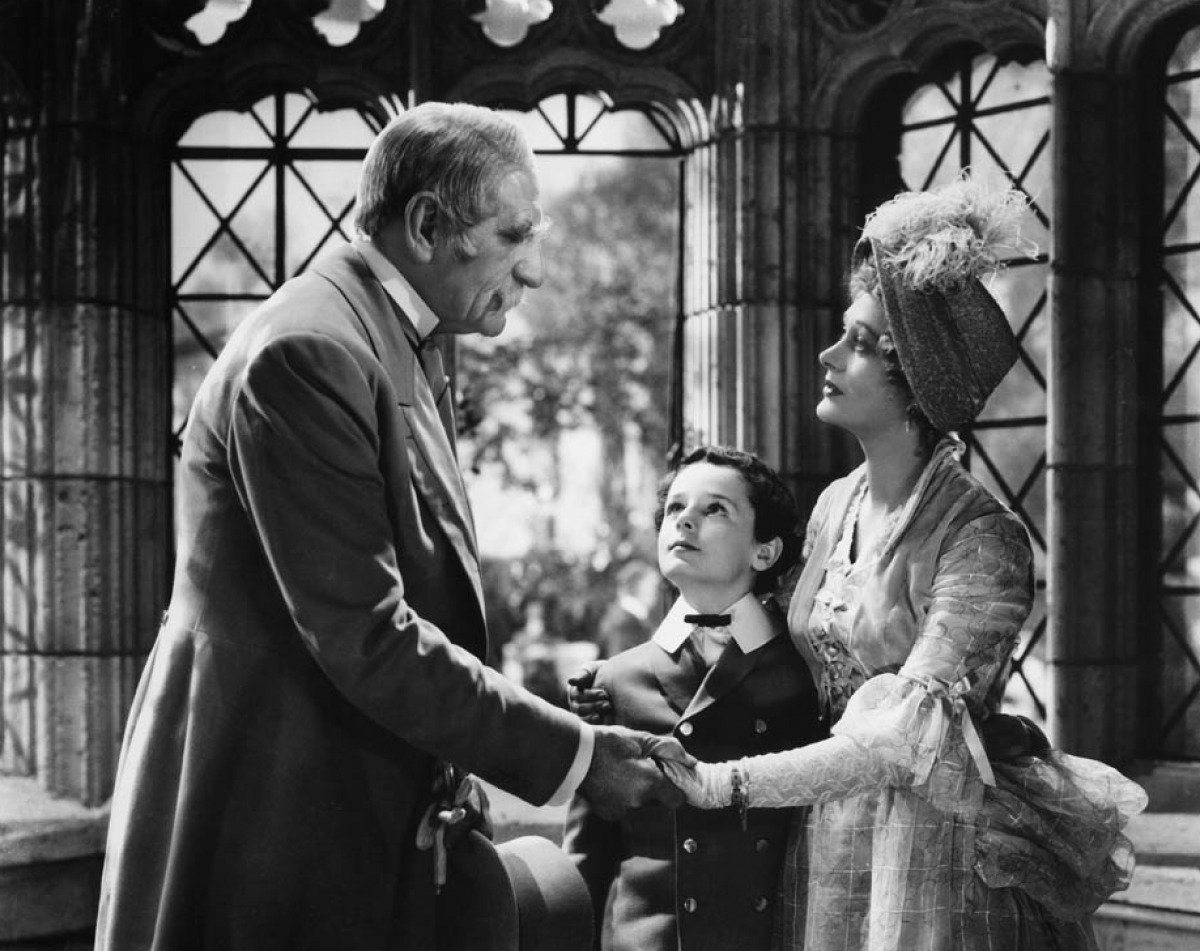
C. Aubrey Smith, Freddie Bartholomew and Dolores Costello in Little Lord Fauntleroy (1936)

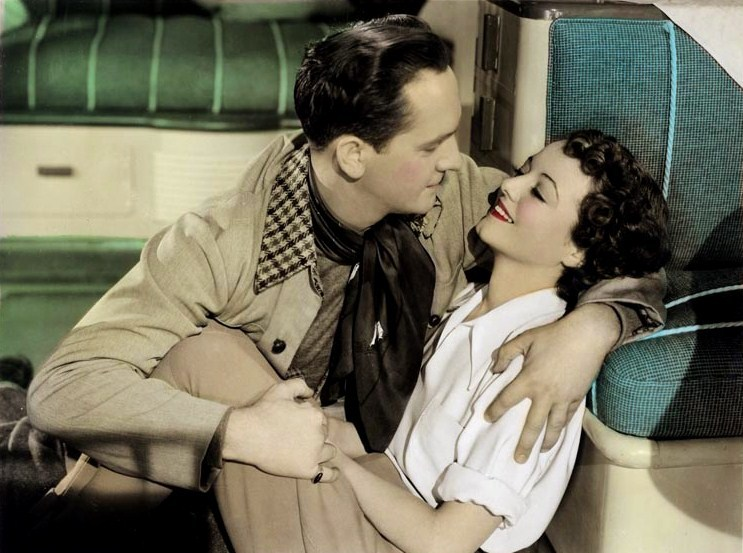
Fredric March and Janet Gaynor in A Star Is Born (1937)

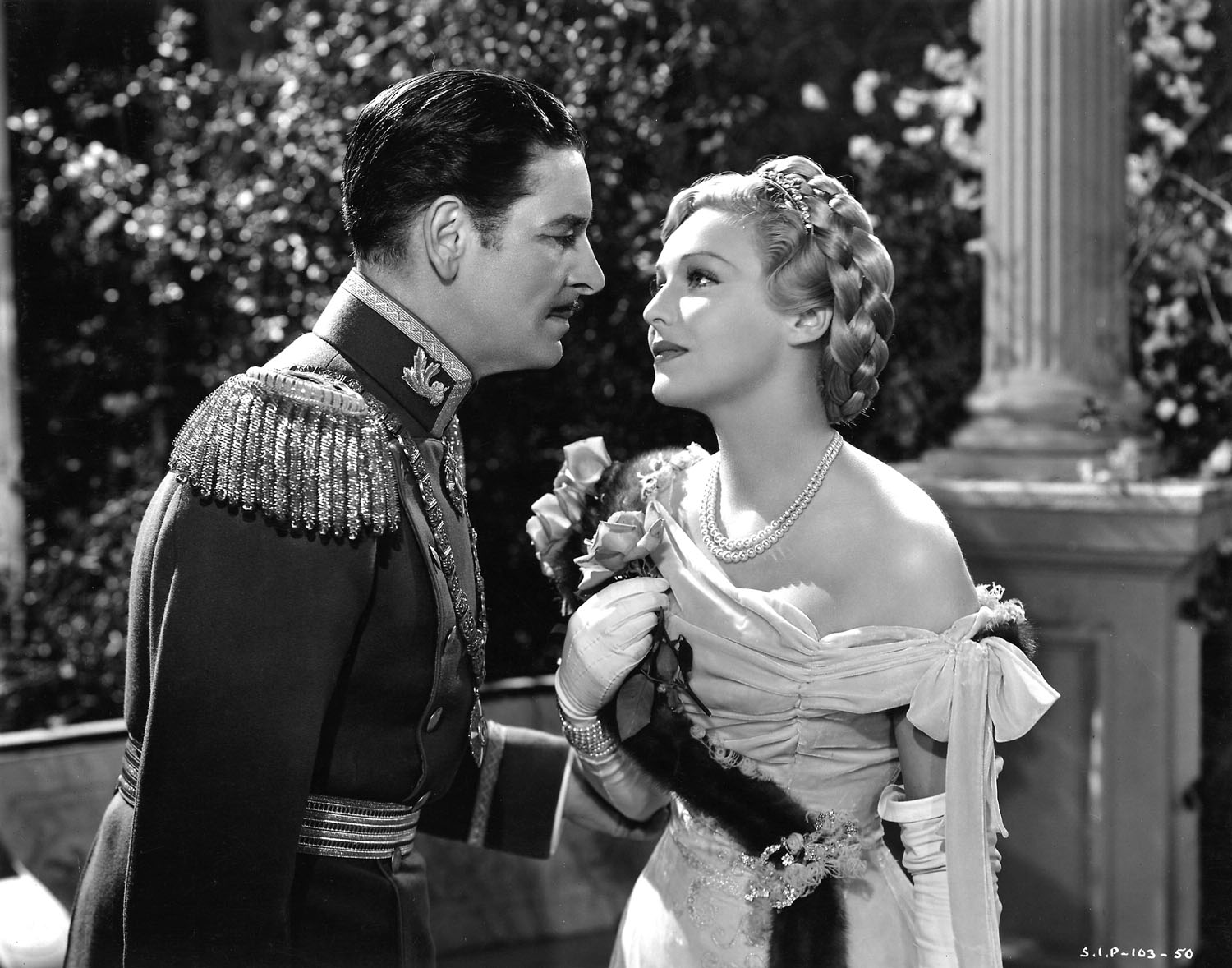
Ronald Colman and Madeleine Carroll in The Prisoner of Zenda (1937)

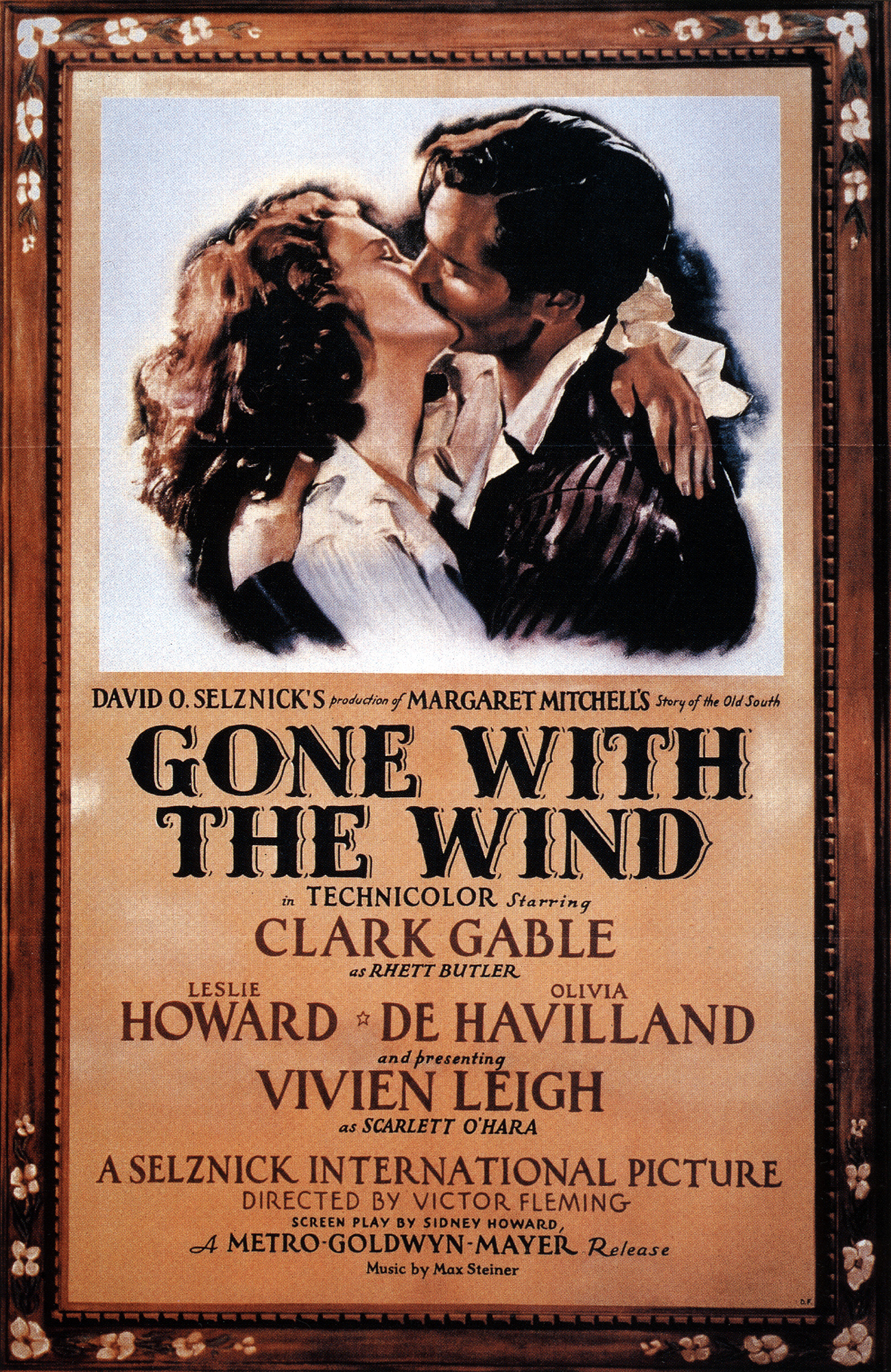
Poster for Gone with the Wind (1939)

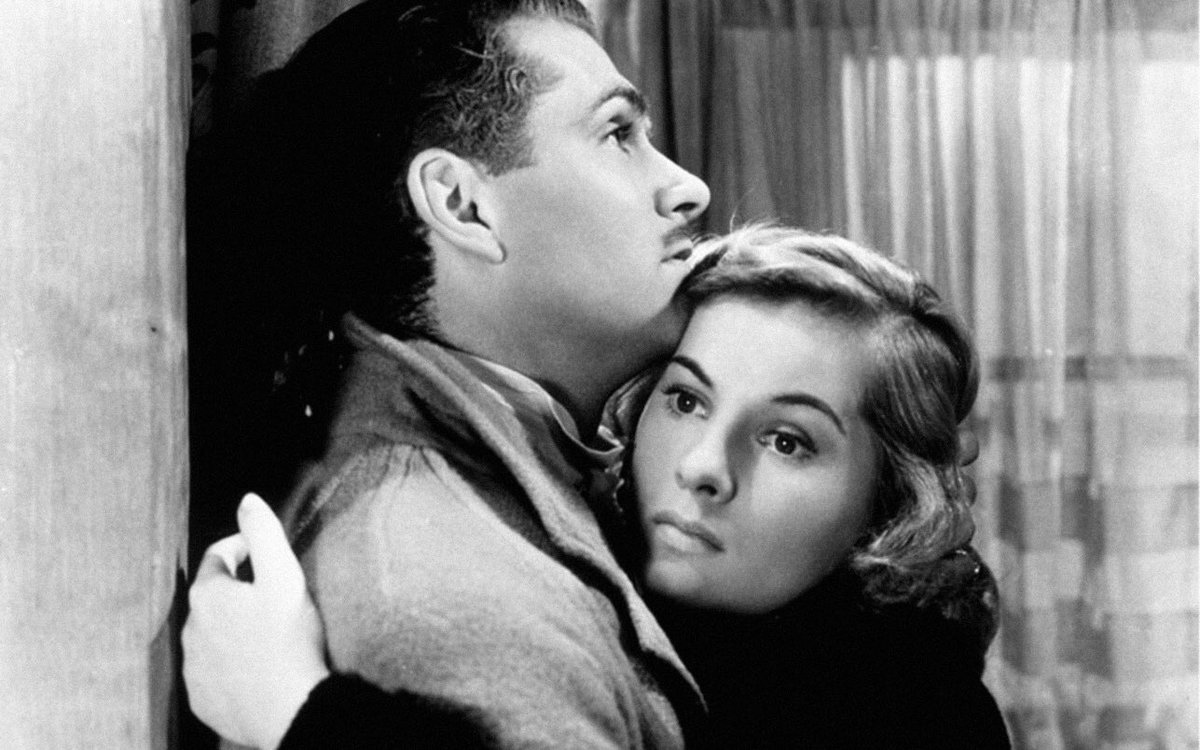
Laurence Olivier and Joan Fontaine in Rebecca (1940)

In the Tradition of Quality

— Company motto of Selznick International Pictures

Selznick International Pictures was founded in 1935 by producer David O. Selznick and investor Jock Whitney after Selznick left Metro-Goldwyn-Mayer and leased a section of RKO Pictures' secondary RKO-Pathé studio lot in Culver City, California. The studio itself had been built in 1918–1919 by film pioneer Thomas Ince. When Ince died in 1924, the studio was taken over by Cecil B. DeMille's Producers Distributing Corporation. Pathé Exchange took over the facility, which became part of RKO when it absorbed Pathé in 1931. The lot would later become part of Lucille Ball and Desi Arnaz's company, Desilu, when it bought RKO's studios in 1957; it is today known as The Culver Studios.

Selznick International Pictures leased offices at the RKO-Pathé lot for the first year and a half of operations, and took over the entire lot in early 1937. The SIP name went up over the entrance of the historic Plantation-style administration building; this view of the front of the building became the iconic studio logo seen at the beginning of SIP films. Even after the studio reverted to RKO management in the 1940s, Selznick kept offices at the RKO-Pathé lot for the rest of his life.

Selznick raised the initial funding of US$400,000 in Los Angeles, with half of that amount coming from his brother Myron Selznick, a Hollywood agent, and the other half from MGM production chief Irving Thalberg and his wife actress Norma Shearer. He raised an additional $300,000 from additional investors in New York, and then the final $2.4 million from Jock Whitney and his family. Whitney himself became chairman of the board, and Selznick president, of the new company.

Because Whitney and his cousin Cornelius Vanderbilt Whitney also owned Pioneer Pictures, an independent studio they formed in 1933 on facilities rented at the RKO studios, Pioneer was informally merged with Selznick International Pictures in 1936. Selznick International assumed Pioneer's contract to make at least six pictures in the new full-color three-strip Technicolor process; the Whitneys owned a 15-percent share in the Technicolor Corporation.

"Unlike his peers in the major studios," wrote film historian Leonard J. Leff, "Selznick produced films as medieval architects built cathedrals: one by one."

Selznick intended to produce a few features each year, a plan which he hoped would allow him to be as picky and careful as he liked and to create the best films possible. He said to his company's board in 1935, "There are only two kinds of merchandise that can be made profitably in this business, either the very cheap pictures or the very expensive pictures." Selznick believed, "there is no alternative open to us but to attempt to compete with the very best."

Although Selznick foresaw a production schedule of six to eight features per year, the studio in fact made only two or three per year, due to Selznick's meticulous attention to detail and protracted writing and editing processes. But in its short life, Selznick International Pictures produced two winners of the Academy Award for Best Picture: Gone with the Wind (1939, co-produced with Metro-Goldwyn-Mayer) and Rebecca (1940), and three nominees, A Star Is Born (1937), Since You Went Away (1944) and Spellbound (1945).

By 1940, Selznick International Pictures was the top-grossing film studio in Hollywood, but without a major studio set-up in which to re-invest his profits, Selznick faced enormous tax problems. That year, to draw down their profits as capital gains, he and the other owners made an agreement with the Internal Revenue Service to liquidate Selznick International within three years, which they did by dividing and selling to each other the company's assets. Jock Whitney and his sister Joan Whitney Payson acquired Gone with the Wind, which they resold at a substantial profit to Metro-Goldwyn-Mayer in 1944. At the time of the final dissolution in 1943, three features were in production or pre-production, although they were released in 1944 and 1945.

To complete his obligation to deliver two more pictures to United Artists, Selznick formed David O. Selznick Productions in 1940 at the same studio location. The new company also took over the old company's contracts with individual directors and actors.

=== Vanguard Films and Selznick Releasing Organization ===
After the dissolution of Selznick International, Selznick established Vanguard Films, Inc. in 1943 and Selznick Releasing Organization in 1946. Vanguard was created to continue his productions, while Selznick Releasing was made to distribute output by Vanguard. Previously, Vanguard released through United Artists, of which Vanguard owned one-third of its stock. As with Selznick International, Vanguard was located at the RKO-Pathé studio.

== Filmography ==
=== Selznick International Pictures ===
Films were distributed by United Artists unless noted.

Release date	Title	Notes
March 6, 1936	Little Lord Fauntleroy	
November 19, 1936	The Garden of Allah	
April 30, 1937	A Star Is Born	
September 3, 1937	The Prisoner of Zenda	(Note: The Selznick International logo theme is introduced with this film, written by Alfred Newman, who composed the score for Zenda. The theme would be used to open every film made by the studio after this.)
November 26, 1937	Nothing Sacred	
February 11, 1938	The Adventures of Tom Sawyer	
October 27, 1938	The Young in Heart	
February 10, 1939	Made for Each Other	
September 22, 1939	Intermezzo: A Love Story	
December 15, 1939	Gone with the Wind	Co-production with Metro-Goldwyn-Mayer. Distributed by Loew's, Inc.
April 12, 1940	Rebecca	

=== Vanguard Films ===
Selznick formed Vanguard Films (1943–1951) to complete projects in progress at the time Selznick International Pictures was dissolved. Films were distributed by United Artists unless noted.

Release date	Title	Notes
May 18, 1944	Reward Unlimited	Short film distributed by the Office of War Information
July 20, 1944	Since You Went Away	
December 1944	I'll Be Seeing You	
December 28, 1945	Spellbound	
December 31, 1946	Duel in the Sun	Distributed by Selznick Releasing Organization
December 29, 1947	The Paradine Case	Distributed by Selznick Releasing Organization
June 4, 1948	Mr. Blandings Builds His Dream House	Distributed by Selznick Releasing Organization
December 24, 1948	Portrait of Jennie	Distributed by Selznick Releasing Organization

== Film library ==
The rights to the Selznick library have been scattered, as noted in the following timeline.

- 1943: Jock Whitney sold to Film Classics, Inc. the rights to A Star Is Born and Nothing Sacred (both of which were actually owned by Pioneer Pictures), and the Selznick International productions Little Lord Fauntleroy, Made for Each Other, and The Young in Heart.
- 1947: Cinecolor Corporation acquired Film Classics, Inc.
- 1949: Cinecolor Corp. resold the company to Film Classics' officers.
- 1950: Film Classics was merged with Eagle-Lion Films to form Eagle Lion Classics.
- 1951: When Eagle Lion Classics collapsed, United Artists acquired its assets.

David O. Selznick retained ownership of The Garden of Allah, The Prisoner of Zenda, The Adventures of Tom Sawyer, Intermezzo, and Rebecca after the liquidation of Selznick International Pictures. Selznick died in 1965; the following year, his estate sold the rights to 26 of his features to American Broadcasting Companies, Inc., which owns most of them today (via Walt Disney Studios Motion Pictures; ABC was acquired by Disney in 1996). The notable exception is Gone with the Wind, which Jock Whitney and his sister sold to MGM in 1944. Turner Entertainment Co., which purchased the pre-May 1986 MGM library in 1986, now owns the film with distribution currently held by Warner Bros. The films A Star Is Born, Little Lord Fauntleroy, Nothing Sacred, and Made for Each Other are now in the public domain in the United States, with original film negatives to the latter three films owned by Disney and the former's owned by Warner Bros.

Papers and other artefacts of the studio are now part of the David O. Selznick Collection in the Harry Ransom Humanities Research Center at the University of Texas, Austin.
