= Lyle R. Wheeler =

American Motion Picture Art Director

Lyle Wheeler
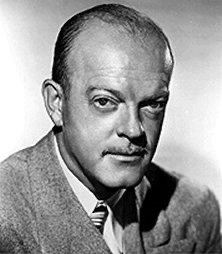
- Born: February 2, 1905; Woburn, Massachusetts, United States
- Died: January 10, 1990 (aged 84); Woodland Hills, California
- Occupation: Art director
- Years active: 1936–1978
- Employer: 20th Century Fox (1944-1960)
- Spouses: Frances Walther (married 1925–1947); Kay Nelson (married 1949–?); Donna G. Wheeler (married 1954–1987)

Lyle Reynolds Wheeler (February 2, 1905 – January 10, 1990) was an American motion picture art director. He received five Academy Awards — for Gone with the Wind (1939), Anna and the King of Siam (1946), The Robe (1953), The King and I (1956) and The Diary of Anne Frank (1959). The first of them was a solo award;, and the other four were shared.

== Biography ==
Lyle Wheeler came to Long Beach, California, as a youth and studied architecture at the University of Southern California, from which he later received an honorary degree. He then worked as a magazine artist and industrial designer. In 1936, he was hired by David O. Selznick to work as a set designer for Selznick's motion picture production company. His first credit as a film art director came that year on The Garden of Allah, an early experiment in colour. Wheeler proved able to design quality sets at reasonable costs and was very much in demand in the industry. By the end of World War II, Wheeler had joined 20th Century Fox, where he remained as chief art director until the end of the 1950s. He was also associated for a long period with the producer Alexander Korda.

In a career spanning roughly 50 years, Wheeler worked on more than 400 motion pictures. His last film credit came in 1975 on Posse. His credits include A Star Is Born, A Tree Grows in Brooklyn, State Fair, The Dolly Sisters, Forever Amber, The Fan, The Pride of St. Louis, Titanic, The Seven Year Itch, and Carousel and in particular, Gone With the Wind, for which he drew some of the earliest examples of storyboards for film, illustrating not only the art design, but the framing, composition and even the color for nearly every shot in the film, greatly influencing the production. The Los Angeles Times described his role on the film as creating the sets for a production designed by William Cameron Menzies. He also created matte paintings for all the ceilings for the sets as well as large set pieces like the facade of Tara. He was nominated for the Academy Award for Best Production Design 29 times, winning five. His first nomination came for The Prisoner of Zenda (1937) and his last for The Cardinal (1963).

Wheeler said in later life that of all his work he was proudest of Anna and the King of Siam (1946). The film was shot in black and white because of a painters' strike, and to compensate for the absence of colour he had sets built of plaster treated to reflect varying colour values. He described re-creating those sets in colour a decade later for the musical version, The King and I.

Wheeler worked as an architect and designer outside the film industry as well. His non-film designs included the Beverly Hills post office, the Hawthorne Elementary School in Beverly Hills, a fountain at the junction of Wilshire and Santa Monica boulevards, the decorative exterior of the Hoover Dam, and houses for friends and associates.

His television credits include the long-running CBS series, Perry Mason.

Late in life, Wheeler suffered financial reverses and was forced to sell his home. He lost his five Academy Award statuettes when he was unable to pay a bill in excess of $30,000 at a storage facility. The statuettes were sold in July 1986 at an auction of goods belonging to tenants who had fallen behind on storage fees; a couple from Long Beach bought several unmarked boxes at $20 each and found the five Oscars inside. Twenty-two of Wheeler's 29 Academy Award nomination plaques were later returned to him after the auction company wrote to the buyers on his behalf. His 1959 Oscar for The Diary of Anne Frank was purchased and returned to Wheeler in 1989 by a fan.

Lyle Wheeler died on January 10, 1990, at the Motion Picture & Television Country House and Hospital, of pneumonia. At his death he was described by the Los Angeles Times as the dean of the art directors who had shaped the look of Hollywood's golden age. He was cremated, and his ashes stored in the vault at the Chapel of the Pines Crematory in Los Angeles.

== Academy Awards ==
The art direction of Lyle Wheeler was often recognized by the Academy of Motion Picture Arts and Sciences.

=== Wins ===
1. 1939: Gone with the Wind
2. 1946: Anna and the King of Siam
3. 1953: The Robe
4. 1956: The King and I
5. 1959: The Diary of Anne Frank

=== Nominations ===
1. 1937: The Prisoner of Zenda
2. 1938: The Adventures of Tom Sawyer
3. 1940: Rebecca
4. 1944: Laura
5. 1945: Leave Her to Heaven
6. 1947: The Foxes of Harrow
7. 1949: Come to the Stable
8. 1950: All About Eve
9. 1951: Fourteen Hours, House on Telegraph Hill, David and Bathsheba, On the Riviera
10. 1952: My Cousin Rachel, Viva Zapata!, The Snows of Kilimanjaro
11. 1953: The President's Lady, Titanic
12. 1954: Desirée
13. 1955: Daddy Long Legs, Love Is a Many-Splendored Thing
14. 1956: Teenage Rebel
15. 1958: A Certain Smile
16. 1959: Journey to the Center of the Earth
17. 1963: The Cardinal

== See also ==
- Art Directors Guild Hall of Fame
