= I'll Be Seeing You (1944 film) =

1944 drama film directed by William Dieterle

- Directed by: William Dieterle
- Screenplay by: Marion Parsonnet
- Based on: Double Furlough by Charles Martin
- Produced by: Dore Schary
- Starring: Ginger Rogers; Joseph Cotten; Shirley Temple
- Cinematography: Tony Gaudio
- Edited by: William H. Ziegler
- Music by: Daniele Amfitheatrof
- Production companies: Vanguard Films; Selznick International Pictures
- Distributed by: United Artists
- Release date: December 24, 1944 (Los Angeles)
- Running time: 85 minutes
- Country: United States
- Language: English
- Budget: $1.3 million—$1.5 million
- Box office: over $6 million

I'll Be Seeing You is a 1944 American Christmas drama film directed by William Dieterle, and starring Ginger Rogers, Joseph Cotten, and Shirley Temple. The film follows Zachary Morgan (Cotten), a World War II soldier suffering from post-traumatic stress disorder, and Mary Marshall (Rogers), a woman serving a prison sentence for involuntary manslaughter who has been furloughed, and their chance encounter while returning home for Christmas. The screenplay was written by Marion Parsonnet, based on a radio play by Charles Martin. The film was produced by Dore Schary, with David O. Selznick serving as executive producer.

Released by United Artists on December 24, 1944, I'll Be Seeing You was a major hit for the studio, grossing $3 million in rentals.

The soundtrack includes the song "I'll Be Seeing You", which had become a nostalgic hit that year, although it dated back to 1938. The film's title was taken from the song, at the suggestion of Schary.

== Plot ==
Social outcasts Mary Marshall and Sgt. Zachary Morgan meet while seated across from each other on a train bound for Pinehill. Zach, a victim of PTSD, then termed shell shock, has just been granted a ten-day leave from a military hospital to try to readjust to daily life. Mary, convicted for involuntary manslaughter, has just been given an eight-day furlough from prison to spend the Christmas holiday with her aunt Sarah and uncle Henry in Pinehill. Each harbours a secret. Mary lies to Zach that she is a travelling saleslady on her way to spend the holidays with her family, while Zach tells Mary that he is going to visit his sister in Pinehill. After the train pulls into the station, the two exchange names. Mary then goes to the Marshall home, where she is reunited with Henry, Sarah and cousin Barbara.

Zach, meanwhile, checks into the YMCA. Unsure of herself after a three-year confinement in prison, Mary laments the loss of her youthful dreams of having a husband and family. Soon after, Zach phones and Mary invites him to dinner. After the meal, Zach confesses to Mary that he has no sister and stopped in Pinehill just to be near her. He and Mary then attend a war movie, but Zach falls mute when Mary questions him about his own experiences in the war. While stopping at a café afterward, Zach panics when the soda jerk, Swanson, who is afflicted with a facial tic, recounts being shell-shocked during World War I. Apprehensive that his affliction will also result in disfigurement, Zach flees the café and is unable to share his fears with Mary.

Upon returning home, Mary, who is sharing Barbara's room, finds that Barbara has labeled her possessions. Realizing that Barbara distrusts her, Mary relates the circumstances that sent her to prison. After the death of her parents, Mary had gone to work as a secretary. One night, her wealthy boss invited her to dinner at his apartment and Mary naively accepted, believing that he was inviting her to a party. Shocked to discover that she was the only guest, Mary was then accosted by her drunken boss. While struggling to avoid his advances, Mary pushed him away, sending him to his death through an open window, and Mary was sentenced to six years in prison. At the end of Mary's story, Barbara, who is touched by her cousin's misfortune, begs her forgiveness.

The next day, Zach invites Mary to the lake and there explains his behavior of the previous night. After voicing his fears of becoming like Swanson, Zach asks Mary to help him believe in himself as she believes in herself. Over Christmas dinner at the Marshall house, Zach rhapsodizes about feeling at home with the family. Aware that her stay with the family is temporary, Mary becomes despondent and asks Sarah if she should tell Zach the truth. Sarah counsels her to remain silent. When Zach invites the Marshall family to the New Year's Eve party at the YMCA, Sarah buys Mary a new dress for the occasion. At the party, a US Senator solicits Zach's opinion as a soldier on political issues, and Zach outspokenly replies that each soldier is an individual and, as such, holds different opinions. While walking home with Mary after the dance, Zach is attacked by a dog and fends off the animal until its owner arrives to restrain it. As Mary bids Zach goodnight, she comments that he has regained his confidence and is now recovered. Knowing that they are both scheduled to leave the next day, Zach tries to discuss their future together; but Mary feigns sleepiness and asks to delay the discussion. Entering the house in tears, Mary confides her love for Zach to Sarah.

Meanwhile, after jubilantly returning to his hotel room, Zach suffers a relapse but is restored by recalling the sound of Mary's voice. The next day, Zach comes to the Marshall house to say goodbye. While alone with Zach, Barbara, not knowing that Zach is unaware of her cousin's conviction, mentions some of the details of Mary's prison sentence. Mary senses that something is wrong when Zach suddenly becomes distant and silently boards the train. Upon returning home, Mary discovers that Barbara has divulged her secret and collapses, weeping. But that night, as Mary approaches the gates of the state prison, Zach steps from the shadows to embrace her and declare his love.

== Cast ==
- Ginger Rogers as Mary Marshall
- Joseph Cotten as Zachary Morgan
- Shirley Temple as Barbara Marshall
- Spring Byington as Sarah Marshall
- Tom Tully as Henry Marshall
- John Derek as Lt. Bruce
- Chill Wills as Swanson
- Kenny Bowers as Sailor On Train
- Gary Gray as Franklin (uncredited)
- Olin Howland as Train Vendor (uncredited)

== Production ==
=== Development ===
Based on the radio play of the same name by Charles Martin, the screenplay for I'll Be Seeing You was adapted by Marion Parsonnet. The film had the early working titles of All My Heart and Double Furlough. In January 1944, it was announced that John Cromwell had been hired to direct, though William Dieterle eventually replaced him.

=== Casting ===
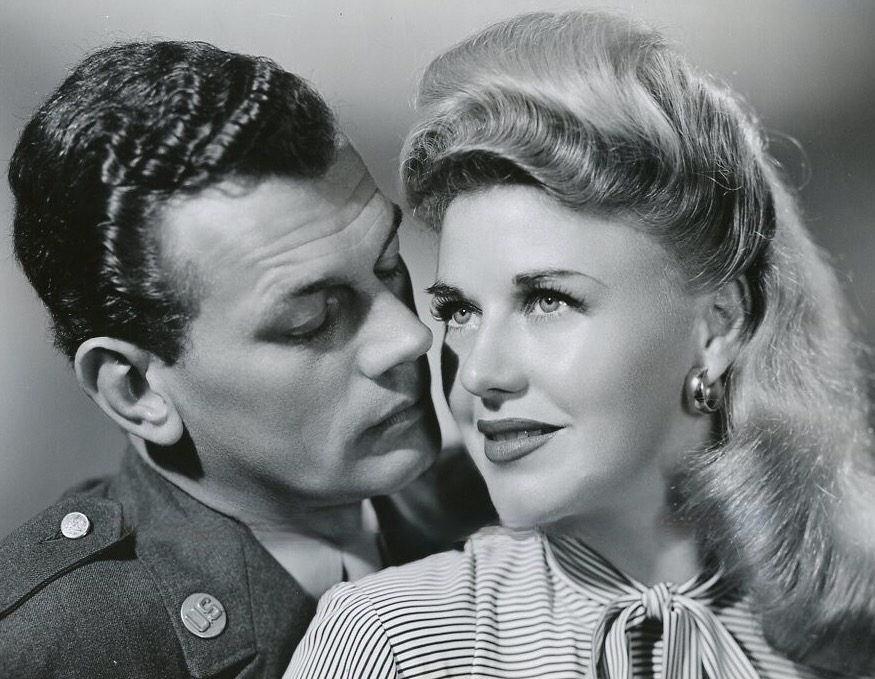
Joseph Cotten and Ginger Rogers in a publicity still for the film

Joseph Cotten's casting was announced in late 1943. Joan Fontaine was initially cast in the lead role of Mary Marshall, but had to withdraw due to prior commitments. Some contemporary sources suggested that Fontaine had to drop out of the film due to ill health. Ginger Rogers was ultimately cast in the part after Fontaine's departure.

Fifteen-year-old Shirley Temple was cast as Barbara Marshall, the younger cousin of Mary, marking her first screen appearance in several years. Temple celebrated her sixteenth birthday while making the film.

=== Filming ===
Principal photography of I'll Be Seeing You took place in Big Bear Lake and Chatsworth, California, with additional photography occurring at the RKO Ranch and the Iverson Movie Ranch. Filming occurred in the spring of 1944, commencing on April 3.

Unsatisfied with Dieterle's direction of actress Shirley Temple during her confession regarding Mary's prison record, producer David O. Selznick hired George Cukor to undertake a reshoot of the scene after principal photography was completed.

== Release ==
United Artists released I'll Be Seeing You in Los Angeles on Christmas Eve 1944 before expanding its release nationwide on January 5, 1945.

=== Home media ===
MGM Home Entertainment released I'll Be Seeing You on DVD on October 19, 2004. Kino Lorber released the film on Blu-ray on November 21, 2017.

== Reception ==
=== Box office ===
The film was a box office hit, earning $3 million in domestic rentals. Producer Dore Schary's share of the profits came to $97,000.

=== Critical response ===
Edwin Schallert of the Los Angeles Times praised the film's writing, direction, and performances, writing that Rogers is "notably competent in the dramatic part she plays," and also observed Temple's performance as a significant departure from her previous comedic work as a child actor. Virginia Wright of the Los Angeles Daily News observed that Rogers plays her role with "becoming restraint" and praised the film as a "moving fullscale drama."

Bosley Crowther of The New York Times wrote that the film's screenplay is "charged with dramatic force" and praised the lead performances,: "Joseph Cotten and Ginger Rogers give performances that are excellent. Mr. Cotten, because his role is obviously the more demanding and tenebrous, deserves the highest honors. He plays the shell-shocked veteran with supreme restraint and with a calm and determined independence that beautifully reveals his pain and pride. Miss Rogers is altogether moving as the girl likewise injured by fate, but her role is plainly fashioned for reflection and counterpoint."

Tyler Foster, reviewing the film in 2017 for DVD Talk, praised the film for its compelling characters, and described it as "a Christmastime curiosity, an oddly gloomy but subtly hopeful romance about two people struggling with their own surprisingly complex baggage." Glenn Erickson, also writing in 2017, noted I'll Be Seeing You as an "accomplished picture" that "hasn't much of a reputation yet."

In his thesis Coming Home from "The Good War": World War II Veterans as Depicted in American Film and Fiction (1991), academic James I. Deutsch credits I'll Be Seeing You as one of the earliest films to depict the troubled psychological states of soldiers after their return home from combat in World War II.

== See also ==
- List of American films of 1944
- List of Christmas films

== Sources ==
- Deutsch, James I. (1991). Coming Home from "The Good War": World War II Veterans as Depicted in American Film and Fiction (Thesis). Washington, D.C.: George Washington University. OCLC 29345297.
- Gambone, Michael D. (2005). The Greatest Generation Comes Home: The Veteran in American Society. College Station, Texas: Texas A&M University Press. ISBN 978-1-58544-488-5.
- Levy, Emanuel (1994). George Cukor: Master of Elegance: Hollywood's Legendary Director and His Stars. New York City, New York: William Morrow and Company. ISBN 978-0-688-11246-2.
- Schatz, Thomas (1999). Boom and Bust: American Cinema in the 1940s. Berkeley, California: University of California Press. ISBN 978-0-520-22130-7.
- Thomson, David (1992). Showman: The Life of David O. Selznick. New York City, New York: Alfred A. Knopf. ISBN 978-0-394-56833-1.
