= The Prisoner of Zenda (1937 film) =

1937 film by John Cromwell

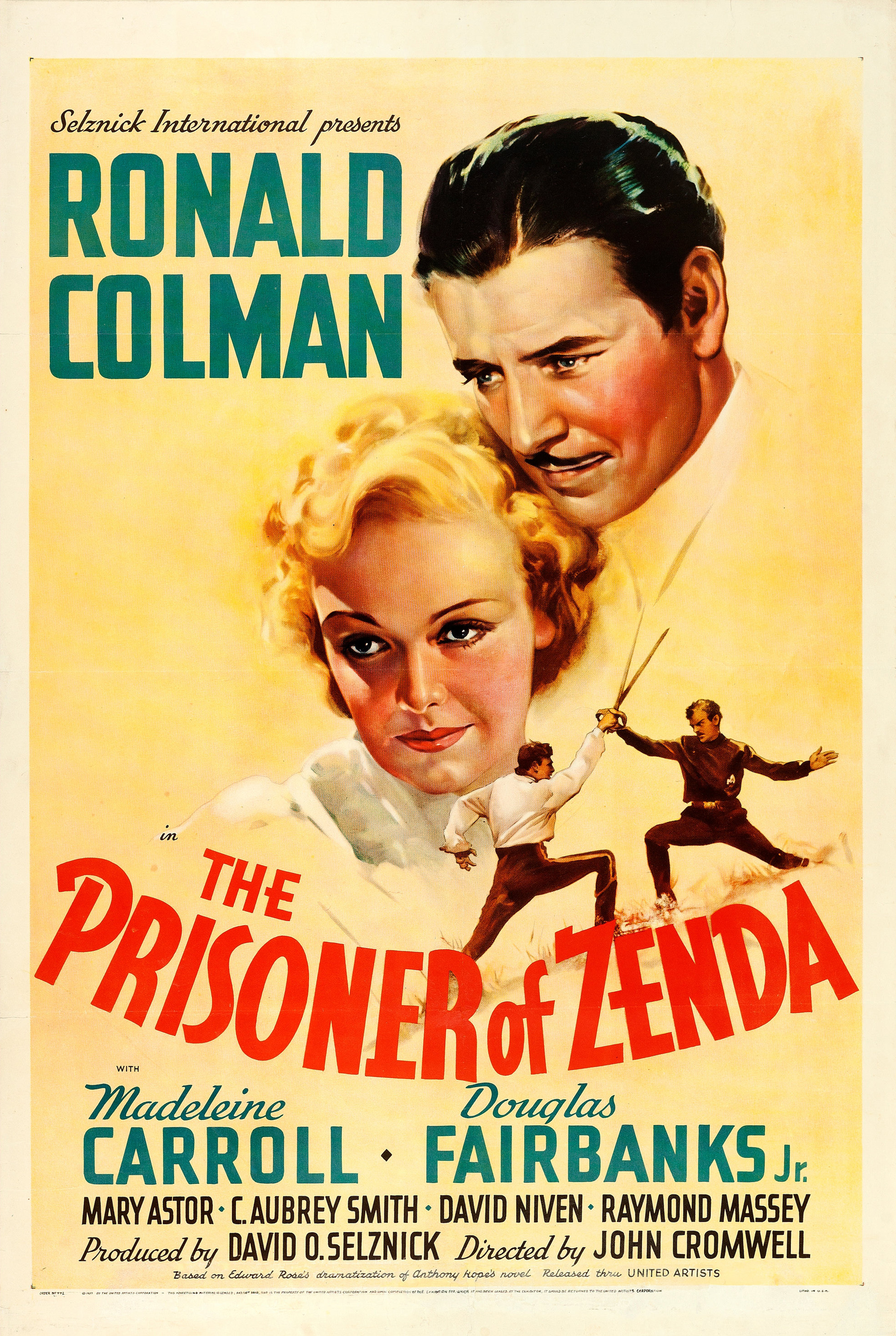
- Theatrical release poster
- Directed by: John Cromwell; W. S. Van Dyke (uncredited)
- Written by: Wells Root (adaptation); Donald Ogden Stewart (additional dialogue); Ben Hecht (uncredited); Sidney Howard (uncredited)
- Screenplay by: John L. Balderston from the novel (and Edward Rose's dramatization)
- Based on: The Prisoner of Zenda 1894 novel by Anthony Hope; The Prisoner of Zenda 1896 play by Edward Rose
- Produced by: David O. Selznick
- Starring: Ronald Colman; Madeleine Carroll; Douglas Fairbanks Jr. Mary Astor
- Cinematography: James Wong Howe; Bert Glennon (uncredited)
- Edited by: James E. Newcom; Hal C. Kern (supervising film editor)
- Music by: Alfred Newman
- Production company: Selznick International Pictures
- Distributed by: United Artists
- Release date: September 2, 1937
- Running time: 101 minutes
- Country: United States
- Language: English
- Budget: $1,250,000
- Box office: $2.5 million (U.S. and Canada rentals)

The Prisoner of Zenda is a 1937 American black-and-white adventure film based on Anthony Hope's 1894 novel and the 1896 play. A lookalike impersonates his royal distant relative when the royal is kidnapped to prevent his coronation. This version is widely considered the best of the many film adaptations of the novel and play.

The film stars Ronald Colman, Madeleine Carroll and Douglas Fairbanks Jr., with a supporting cast including C. Aubrey Smith, Raymond Massey, Mary Astor and David Niven. It was directed by John Cromwell, produced by David O. Selznick for Selznick International Pictures and distributed by United Artists. The screenplay was written by John L. Balderston, adapted by Wells Root from the novel, with dramatization by Edward Rose; Donald Ogden Stewart was responsible for additional dialogue and Ben Hecht and Sidney Howard made uncredited contributions.

Alfred Newman received the first of his 43 Academy Award nominations, for Original Music Score, while Lyle R. Wheeler was nominated for Best Art Direction. In 1991, this 1937 version was deemed "culturally, historically, or aesthetically significant" by the United States Library of Congress and selected for preservation in its National Film Registry.

== Plot ==
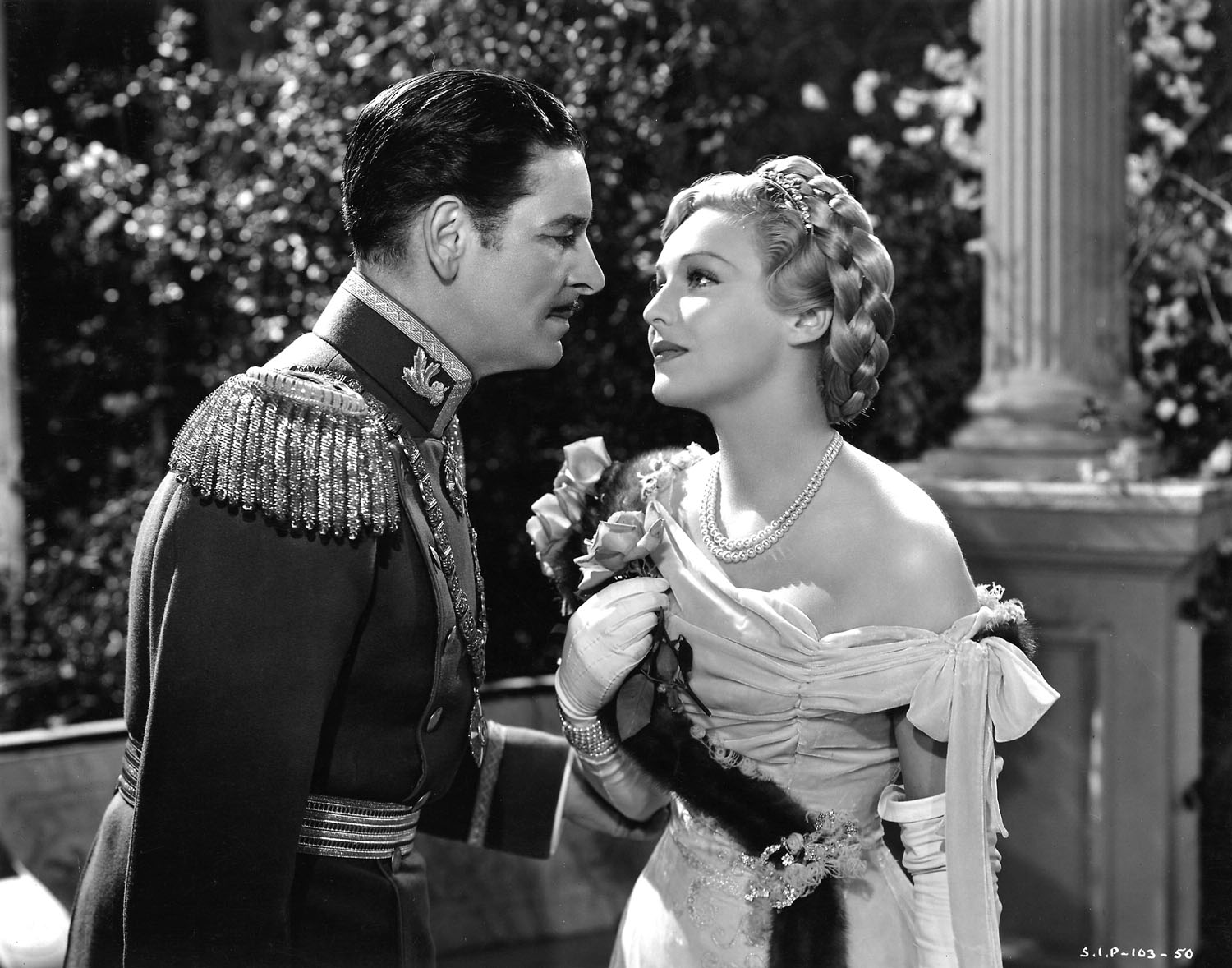
Ronald Colman and Madeleine Carroll in The Prisoner of Zenda

In June 1897, English gentleman Rudolf Rassendyll (Colman) takes a fishing vacation in a small country somewhere between Vienna and Bucharest (unnamed in the film; Ruritania in the novel). He is puzzled by the odd reactions of the natives to him. Rassendyll discovers why when he meets Colonel Zapt and Captain Fritz von Tarlenheim. Zapt introduces him to the soon-to-be-crowned king, Rudolph V (Colman again), a distant relative who looks just like him (except for the Englishman's beard). This is due to the relationship between the king's great-great-great-grandfather and Rassendyll's great-great-great-grandmother. The king, astounded and amused by the close resemblance, takes a great liking to the Englishman.

They celebrate their acquaintance by drinking late into the night. Rudolph is particularly delighted with the bottle of wine sent to him by his half-brother, Duke Michael, so much so that he drinks it all himself. The next morning brings a disastrous discovery: the wine was drugged. Rudolph cannot be awakened, and if he cannot attend his coronation that day, Michael will likely try to usurp the throne. Michael is bitterly jealous that he, though older than Rudolph, is not the heir to the throne because his mother was not of royal blood. Zapt convinces a reluctant Rassendyll to impersonate Rudolf for the ceremony.

With the coronation accomplished, Rassendyll returns to resume his real identity, only to find the king has been abducted by Rupert of Hentzau, Michael's chief henchman. Rassendyll is forced to continue the impersonation while Zapt searches for Rudolph; however, Michael cannot denounce the masquerade without incriminating himself or even have Rudolph killed while Rassendyll sits on the throne.

Rassendyll meets Rudolph's betrothed, Princess Flavia, at the coronation and becomes enamored of her. She had always detested her cousin Rudolph, but now finds him greatly changed, very much for the better in her opinion. After spending time together, they fall in love.

Help finding the king's whereabouts comes from an unexpected quarter. In order for Michael to secure his claim to the throne, he must marry his cousin Flavia. Antoinette de Mauban, Michael's French mistress, does not want this and promises to help rescue the king in exchange for Michael's life. She tells Rassendyll that Rudolf is being held in Michael's castle near Zenda. Since the king would be executed at the first sign of a rescue attempt, Antoinette insists that one man must swim across the moat and hold off his would-be assassins until loyal troops can storm the castle. Rassendyll decides that he is that man, over Zapt's strenuous objections.

Their plans go awry when Michael discovers Rupert trying to seduce his mistress. In the ensuing struggle, Rupert stabs Michael to death. A heartbroken Antoinette blurts out enough to alert Rupert to his danger. Rassendyll kills two guards, but must fight a prolonged duel with Rupert, while at the same time attempting to cut a rope to lower the drawbridge for Zapt and his men. When he finally succeeds, Rupert flees.

With King Rudolph restored to his throne, Rassendyll tries to persuade Flavia to leave with him. Both confess their love for each other, but her devotion to duty is too great, and their parting is bittersweet. Later, Zapt and von Tarlenheim escort Rassendyll to the border.

== Cast ==
- Ronald Colman as Major Rassendyll and the "Prisoner of Zenda" (King Rudolf V)
- Madeleine Carroll as Princess Flavia
- Douglas Fairbanks Jr. as Rupert of Hentzau
- C. Aubrey Smith as Colonel Zapt
- Raymond Massey as Duke Michael
- Mary Astor as Antoinette de Mauban
- David Niven as Captain Fritz von Tarlenheim

Unbilled:

- Montagu Love as Detchard, one of Michael's henchmen
- William von Brincken as Kraftstein
- Florence Roberts as Duenna
- Torben Meyer as Max, the butler
- Lawrence Grant as Marshal Strakencz
- Ralph Faulkner as Bersonin
- Byron Foulger as Master Johann
- Howard Lang as Josef, a murdered servant
- Alexander D'Arcy as De Gautet
- Boyd Irwin as Master of ceremonies
- Emmett King as Lord High Chamberlain
- Al Shean as Orchestra leader
- Charles Halton as Customs official who checks Rassendyll's passport
- Spencer Charters as Porter
- Henry Roquemore as Station master
- Lillian Harmer as Station attendant

== Production ==
Douglas Fairbanks Jr. initially wanted to play Rudolf, but when the role went to Colman, his father, Douglas Fairbanks, told him "not only is The Prisoner of Zenda one of the best romances written in a hundred years and always a success, but Rupert of Hentzau is probably one of the best villains ever written".

When the play opened in London in January 1896, C. Aubrey Smith had played the dual lead roles. Massey asked Smith for advice and was told, "My dear Ray, in my time I have played every part in The Prisoner of Zenda except Princess Flavia. And I always had trouble with Black Michael!"

The orchestra conductor who is forced to cease and resume conducting the Künstlerleben Walzer by Strauss every time the royal couple stop and start waltzing was played by Al Shean, uncle of the Marx Brothers (Groucho, Harpo, Chico and Zeppo) as well as half the earlier comedy team Gallagher and Shean.

Former Prince of Sweden Sigvard Bernadotte was working in Hollywood at the time and was credited as a technical advisor.

This production was "one of the last great gatherings of the Hollywood English" before World War II. Selznick was partly inspired to take on the project because of the abdication of Edward VIII, and exploited this angle in his marketing of the film.

It was considered a difficult shoot. Director John Cromwell was unhappy with his male leads, as he suspected that Colman did not know his lines, and was concerned about Fairbanks' and Niven's late nights on the town. George Cukor directed a few scenes of the film when Cromwell grew frustrated with his actors, especially Madeleine Carroll over the scene dealing with the renunciation. Woody Van Dyke was brought in to re-shoot some of the fencing scenes.

A prologue and an epilogue were shot, but never used. The prologue has an elderly Rassendyll recounting his adventures in his club. In the epilogue, he receives a letter from von Tarlenheim and a rose, informing him that Flavia has died.

== Reception ==
Leslie Halliwell ranks it at #590 on his list of best films, saying that the "splendid schoolboy adventure story" of the late Victorian novel is "perfectly transferred to the screen", and quotes a 1971 comment by John Cutts that the film becomes more "fascinating and beguiling" as time goes by. Halliwell's Film Guide 2008 calls it "one of the most entertaining films to come out of Hollywood". Twelve residents of Zenda, Ontario, were flown to New York for the premiere.

The film earned a net profit of $182,000.

Review aggregator Rotten Tomatoes gives the film an approval rating of 100%, with an average rating of 8.5/10, based on 10 reviews.

== Legacy ==
In 1947, Selznick announced he would make a sequel based on a play adaptation of Rupert of Hentzau, starring Joseph Cotten as King Rudolph/Rudolph, Louis Jourdan and Alida Valli. The film was never made.

Colman, Smith and Fairbanks reprised their roles for a 1939 episode of Lux Radio Theatre, with Colman's wife Benita Hume playing Princess Flavia. Hume and Colman reprised their roles as Rudolph and Flavia again in the 1949 episode of Screen Director's Playhouse.

The 1952 film of the same name is virtually a shot-by-shot remake, reusing the same shooting script, dialogue, and film score, but in Technicolor. A comparison of the two films reveals that settings and camera angles, in most cases, are the same. Halliwell judged it "no match for the happy inspiration of the original".

=== In popular culture ===
The Prisoner of Swing is a 1938 musical short that parodies this film. Hal Le Roy played Rudolph, King of Sulvania, who outlaws swing music on pain of death, as well as his distant relative, a swing-loving saxophone player. June Allyson played the Princess.

The entire Potsdorf sequence in Blake Edwards' The Great Race (1965) is an homage to (or parody of) The Prisoner of Zenda. Jack Lemmon plays the roles of the doubles (Professor Fate and Prince Hapnik); Tony Curtis is the swashbuckler (Leslie Gallant lll, a/k/a The Great Leslie), crossing swords with Baron Rolfe von Stuppe, Ross Martin's answer to Douglas Fairbanks, Jr.'s Rupert of Hentzau.

Two episodes of the spoof spy television series Get Smart, "The King Lives?" and "To Sire With Love, Parts 1 and 2", parodied the 1937 movie version, with Don Adams imitating Colman's distinctive voice.

During pre-production of Star Trek II: The Wrath of Khan, director Nicholas Meyer asked costume designer Robert Fletcher to design new Starfleet uniforms inspired by the uniforms worn in The Prisoner of Zenda. The resulting uniform costumes appeared in six Star Trek films in total, from The Wrath of Khan through Star Trek Generations.

In the season 4 episode "Sleeping With the Enemy" of the television series Northern Exposure, Ed Chigliak dubs the film into Tlingit, a Native American language.

"The Prisoner of Benda" is the ninety-eighth episode of the animated television series Futurama.

In DC comic book Blades supervillain Cavalier has the poster of The Prisoner of Zenda in his hideout.
