= Reward Unlimited =

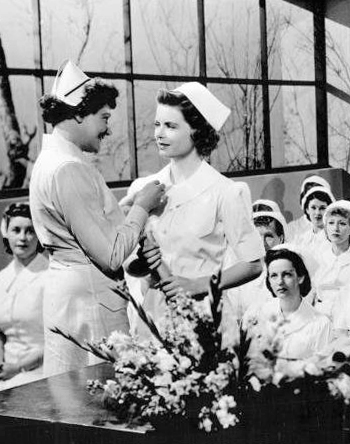
- Fay Holden and Dorothy McGuire
- Directed by: Jacques Tourneur
- Written by: Mary C. McCall, Jr.
- Produced by: B. P. Fineman
- Starring: Dorothy McGuire; Aline MacMahon; James Brown; Spring Byington; Tom Tully
- Production company: Vanguard Films
- Distributed by: Office of War Information
- Release date: May 18, 1944
- Running time: 10 minutes
- Country: United States
- Language: English

Reward Unlimited is a short film produced in 1944 by David O. Selznick's Vanguard Films, for the United States Public Health Service, dramatizing the need for volunteer military nurses for the U. S. Cadet Nurse Corps during World War II. Directed by Jacques Tourneur, the 10-minute film stars Dorothy McGuire in one of her first films. The story by Mary C. McCall, Jr., dramatizes the choice that young Peggy Adams makes to become a nurse, her training, and her volunteering for military nursing service. The cast includes Aline MacMahon, James Brown, Spring Byington and Tom Tully.

Reward Unlimited was released May 18, 1944. Distributed by the United States Office of War Information, the film was exhibited in 16,000 theaters and seen by an estimated 90 million people. It was also presented at Cadet Nurse Corps recruitment events nationwide in 1944 and 1945.

== Plot ==
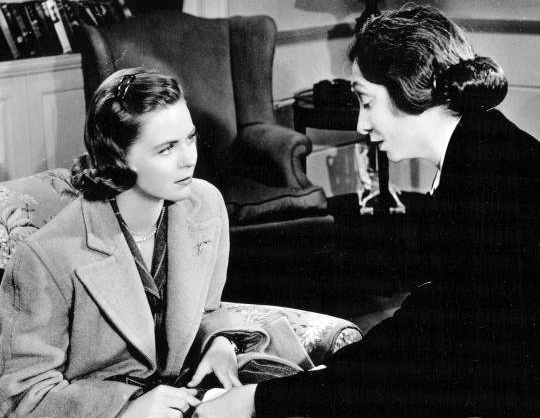
Dorothy McGuire and Aline MacMahon in Reward Unlimited

Peggy Adams (Dorothy McGuire) and her fiancé Paul (James Brown) talk on the eve of his departure for active duty. He tells her, "We'll be married, but afterwards, after we've won the war." Peggy tells him she is going to find some war work herself—"Something that will make you proud of me, something that means something, to bring you home quicker." They part at the railroad station, and on her way home Peggy falls on the sidewalk. A kind nurse (Aline MacMahon) helps her. While bandaging Peggy's knee she tells her about the important work of the new U.S. Cadet Nurse Corps, and its great need for nurses. Back at home, Peggy tries to enlist the support of her mother (Spring Byington), who dismisses the idea of her becoming a cadet nurse—but Peggy's father (Tom Tully) encourages her. In a montage, Peggy undergoes training and is graduated from the program. The last scenes show Peggy and a fellow nurse walking down a hospital corridor, where they hear a child crying. Peggy goes into a dark room, switches on the light and comforts a young boy (Butch Jenkins) who has awoken from a nightmare. He tells her that he likes her more than the other nurses because she has "kind of an inside shine" that shows in her eyes. Peggy says, "I guess that's what happens when you're happy," and she switches off the light. The film ends with Peggy walking toward the camera, while a narrator encourages qualified female viewers to apply for the Cadet Nurse Corps.

== Cast ==
- Dorothy McGuire as Peggy Adams
- James Brown as Paul
- Aline MacMahon as Mrs. Scott
- Spring Byington as Peggy's mother
- Tom Tully as Peggy's father
- Jackie "Butch" Jenkins as the boy

== Reception and legacy ==
"This efficiently functional film is interesting mainly as Tourneur's most explicit study of the medical profession," wrote modern film scholar Chris Fujikawa, who remarked that "one notes in the film's characterization of nursing the same thematic combination of spirituality and service that informs I Walked with a Zombie and Stars in My Crown."

The Academy Film Archive preserved Reward Unlimited in 2013. The film is part of the Academy War Film Collection, one of the largest collections of World War II era short films held outside government archives.

== Gallery ==
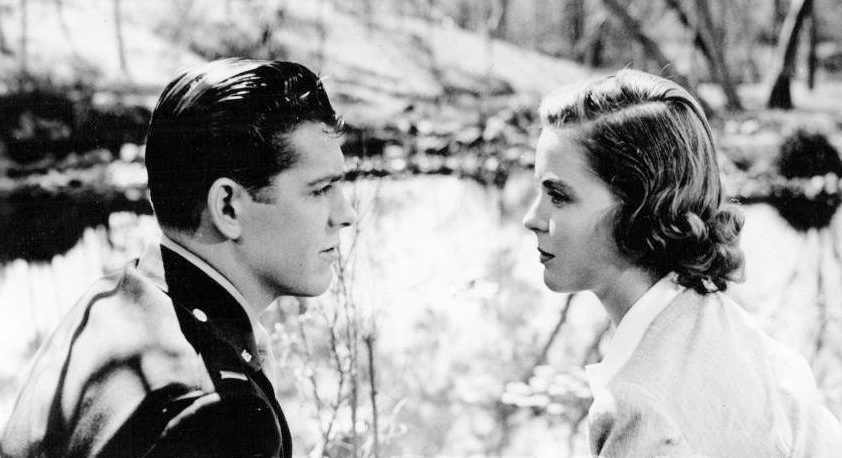
James Brown and Dorothy McGuire

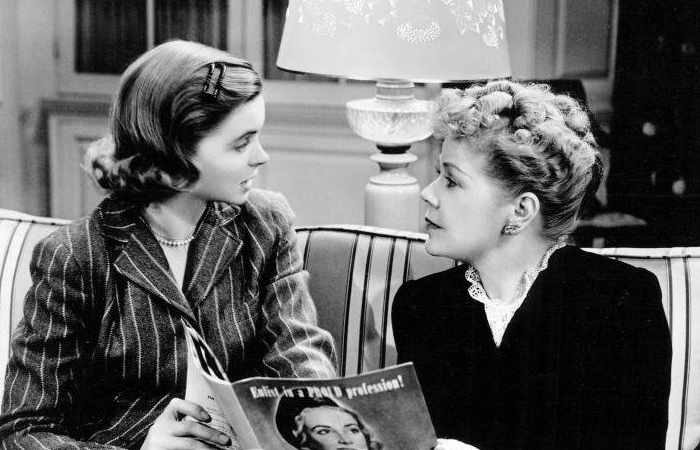
Dorothy McGuire and Spring Byington

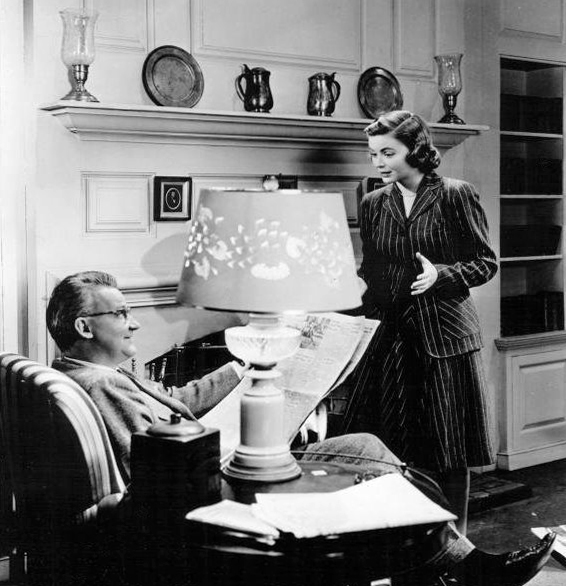
Dorothy McGuire and Tom Tully

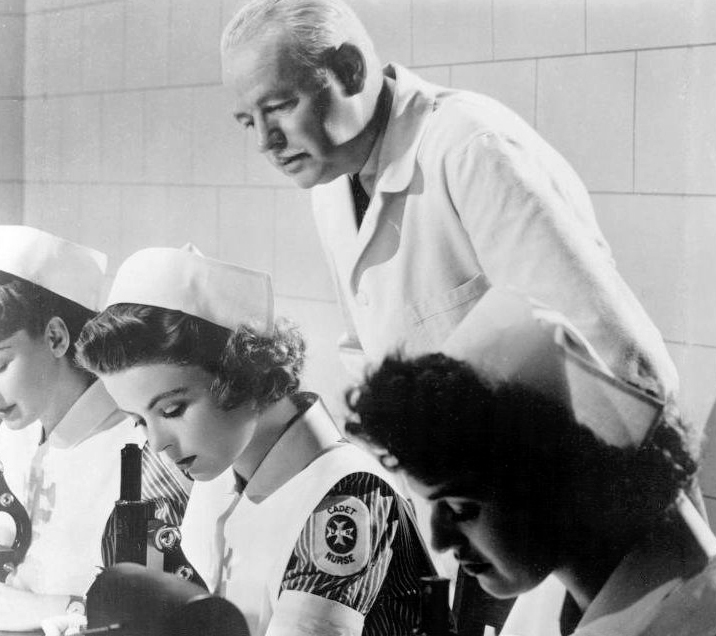
Dorothy McGuire

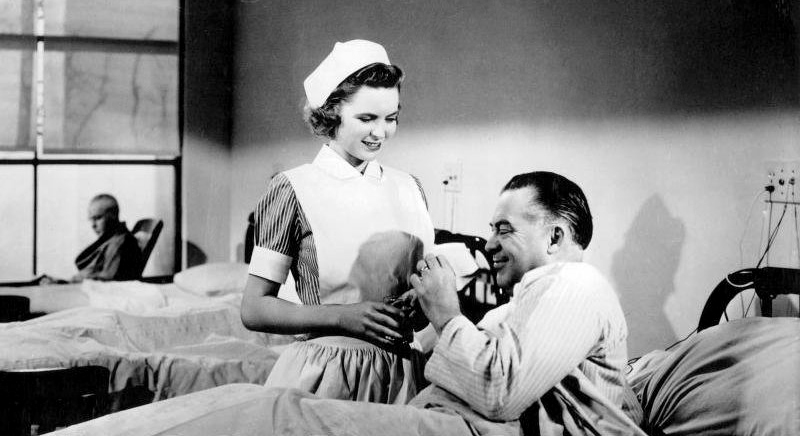
Dorothy McGuire

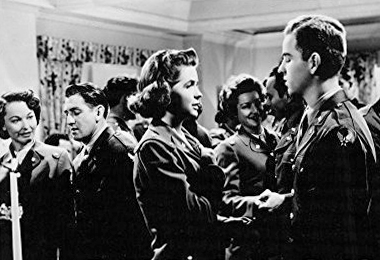
Dorothy McGuire and Robert Forrest

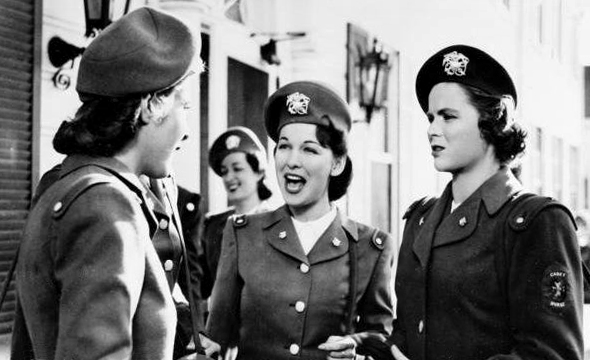
Vanessie Clark, Beatrice Gray and Dorothy McGuire
