= James G. Stewart =

American audio engineer

James Graham Stewart
- James G. Stewart (left) on the RKO Re-recording Stage (circa 1937)
- Born: May 21, 1907; Homewood, Pennsylvania
- Died: March 22, 1997 (aged 89); Los Angeles, California
- Occupation: Audio engineer
- Known for: Pioneer in the field of sound recording and re-recording

James Graham Stewart (May 21, 1907 in Homewood, Pennsylvania – March 22, 1997 in Los Angeles, California) was an American pioneer in the field of sound recording and re-recording. His career spanned more than five decades (1928–1980), during which he made substantial contributions to the evolution of the art and science of film and television sound.

== Career ==
In 1928, James G. Stewart was one of the first employees of the newly established company RCA Photophone. Initially, his job was to install and maintain film sound reproduction systems in movie theaters on the east coast of America, including Radio City Music Hall in New York City. Film sound recording and reproduction was a new medium at that time, and Stewart's knowledge of radio made him a significant figure in the integration of sound into motion pictures. His employers sent him to the West Coast in 1929 to supervise theater installations.

In 1930, Stewart joined RKO Pictures (then owned by RCA), working in their research and development department on a noise reduction system for optical film sound. When corporate interest in the project waned, he was able to move to RKO's production arm as a 'boom man', recording production sound (the "live sound" recorded at the same time as the picture). For the next several years, he participated in the making of some of Hollywood's earliest sound film classics, including A Bill of Divorcement (1932) and The Lost Patrol (1934).

After working in the production phase of the filmmaking process for several years, Stewart switched to post-production. From 1933 to 1945, Stewart was Chief Re-recording Mixer at RKO, personally mixing hundreds of film soundtracks. The most celebrated aspect of Stewart's work during this period is his collaboration with director Orson Welles, also with a background in radio. He worked closely with Welles on Citizen Kane (1941) and The Magnificent Ambersons (1942). Both Welles and Stewart had tremendous insight into the creative use of narrative sound, and these films demonstrated the spectacular heights to which the cinematic arts can be taken.

Stewart left RKO Studios in 1945, when he was hired by David O. Selznick. He was eventually appointed Head of Technical Operations for Selznick International Pictures and oversaw every aspect of production and post-production for such films as King Vidor's controversial Duel in the Sun (1946), Alfred Hitchcock's The Paradine Case (1947) and William Dieterle's Portrait of Jennie (1948).

In an era when network television was beginning to challenge the film industry for audiences, Stewart worked for Glen Glenn Sound, where he stayed for the next 25 years. Early television post-production emphasized speed and efficiency over artistic innovation, and Stewart's daily routine involved mixing two half-hour shows a day, five or six times the pace he had previously kept during the making of A-level films. Among the dozens of programs he worked on were I Love Lucy, The Jack Benny Show, The Real McCoys and The Andy Griffith Show.

By the mid-1970s, Stewart had changed employer once more, this time to The Burbank Studios (owned by Warner Bros.), where he spent the last five years of his working life. During this time he worked on such films as Martin Ritt's The Front (1976) and Paul Schrader's Blue Collar (1978). In 1980, after a career of more than five decades in film and television, Stewart retired.

== Partial filmography ==
Stewart worked on over 250 films during his fifty years as a re-recording mixer. Among these were Little Women (1933), The Gay Divorcee (1934), The Lost Patrol (1934), Of Human Bondage (1934), The Last Days of Pompeii (1935), Swing Time (1936), Bringing Up Baby (1938), Room Service (1938), Gunga Din (1939), The Hunchback of Notre Dame (1939), Abe Lincoln in Illinois (1940), Swiss Family Robinson (1940), The Curse of the Cat People (1944), Murder, My Sweet (1944), Spellbound (1945), Duel in the Sun (1946), Portrait of Jennie (1948) and Johnny Got His Gun (1971).

== Nominations and awards ==
Academy Award Nominations (Special Effects category):

- 1942 The Navy Comes Through [Photographic Effects by Vernon L. Walker; Sound Effects by James G. Stewart]
- 1943 Bombardier [Photographic Effects by Vernon L. Walker; Sound Effects by James G. Stewart, Roy Granville]
- 1944 Days of Glory [Photographic Effects by Vernon L. Walker; Sound Effects by James G. Stewart, Roy Granville]

Academy Award Winner (Special Effects category):

- 1948 Portrait of Jennie [Special Visual Effects by Paul Eagler, Joseph McMillan Johnson, Russell Shearman, Clarence Slifer; Special Audible Effects by Charles L. Freeman, James G. Stewart]

== Innovations ==
As a teenager, Stewart was involved in early experiments in commercial AM broadcast radio. While at RKO Studios, he participated in the production of the first three-strip Technicolor feature film, Becky Sharp (1935), made by RKO affiliate Pioneer Pictures. During his tenure at RKO, he also helped design the studio's first mixing console specifically built for film re-recording and to introduce electronic compression into film post-production. For the film Portrait of Jennie in the late 1940s, Stewart devised an early incarnation of multichannel 'surround sound' technology. Working primarily in television after 1950, Stewart helped usher in such technical advances as reversal ("rock and roll") re-recording.

== Technical and historical papers ==
James G. Stewart adjusting a microphone on a RKO sound stage (early 1930s)

- “Application of Non linear Volume Characteristics to Dialog Recording” (Journal of the Society of Motion Picture Engineers, September 1938) Written with John O. Aalberg.
- “The Rerecording Process” (Audio Engineering Society Reprints, May 1970)
- “Development of Sound Technique” (The American Film Institute, 1977)
- “The Evolution of Cinematic Sound: A Personal Report” (Contained in the book, Sound and the Cinema, Evan Cameron, ed., Redgrave, 1980)

== Bibliography ==
- Carringer, Robert (1985). The Making of Citizen Kane, University of California Press: Berkeley and Los Angeles
- Weaver, John Michael. “Studying the Art of Soundtrack Design,” Mix, Vol. 15, no. 7. (July 1991)
- Weaver, John Michael. “James G. Stewart: Post-Production Pioneer,” Mix, Vol. 16, no. 9. (September 1992)

== Further reading and viewing ==
Stewart was interviewed numerous times about his methods and his working relationship with the film directors and composers with whom he collaborated. Stewart's comments and recollections are included in the following books and films:

- The Making of Citizen Kane by Robert Carringer, (1985). University of California Press: Berkeley and Los Angeles, ISBN 0-520-05876-3
- A Heart at Fire's Center: The Life and Music of Bernard Herrmann by Steven C. Smith. Published by University of California Press, 2002, ISBN 0-520-22939-8
- The Medium and the Magician: Orson Welles, the Radio Years, 1934–1952 by Paul Heyer, Published by Rowman & Littlefield, 2005, ISBN 0-7425-3797-8
- Hollywood The Golden Years: The RKO Story (1987), BBC Documentary Series. 1988 BAFTA Award Nomination for Best Factual Series
- Music for the Movies: Bernard Herrmann (1992) Directed by Joshua Waletzky. ASIN: B000TJ0SB8
