= Charles L. Freeman =

American film editor and sound editor

- Born: August 21, 1908; California, United States
- Died: April 10, 2001 (aged 92); Sherman Oaks, Los Angeles, California, United States
- Other names: Charles Freeman
- Occupation: Sound editor
- Years active: 1944–1972

Charles L. Freeman (August 21, 1908 – April 10, 2001) was an American sound editor and film editor who worked on both television and film.

== Awards ==
He won an Academy Award for Best Special Effects during the 21st Academy Awards for his work on the fantasy film Portrait of Jennie (1948). He shared the award with Paul Eagler, Joseph McMillan Johnson, Russell Shearman, Clarence Slifer, and James G. Stewart.

In addition, Freeman won an Emmy Award for the editing on the police drama television series Naked City.

== Filmography ==
- Since You Went Away (1944)
- Duel in the Sun (1944)
- Portrait of Jennie (1946)
- Battle Taxi (1955)
- Fight for the Title (1957) (short film)
- Operation Bikini (1963)
- Dead Men Tell No Tales (1971)
- Fireball Forward (1972)

== Television shows ==
- Passport to Danger
- Mackenzie's Raiders
- Telephone Time
- Lock Up
- This Man Dawson
- Naked City
- Survival
- Peyton Place
- Lancer
- Hawaii Five-O

== See also ==
- List of people from Los Angeles
- List of Primetime Emmy Award winners
