= Russell Shearman =

American special effects artist

- Born: April 27, 1908; Portland, Oregon, USA
- Died: May 5, 1956 (aged 48) off the coast of Cuba
- Occupation: special effects artist
- Years active: 1946-1956

Russell Morrison Shearman (April 27, 1908 – May 5, 1956) was an Oscar-winning American special effects artist. He was electrocuted while repairing equipment used in filming The Sharkfighters in Cuba 1956, serving as head technician on the picture.

== Career ==
As RKO Studio's head of special effects, he won a Technical Achievement Award for It's a Wonderful Life at the 19th Academy Awards in 1946, shared with department staffer Marty Martin and Jack Lannan, for developing a new method of creating artificial snow for motion picture sets it was the movie's only Award.

Before that time, most fake movie snow was mostly made from cornflakes painted white, and was so loud when stepped on that dialogue had to be re-dubbed afterwards. The new compound utilized water, soap flakes, Foamite (a foaming agent made from licorice waste, used in fire extinguishers) and sugar.

Shearman won an Academy Award during the 21st Academy Awards for Best Special Effects on the film Portrait of Jennie, shared with Paul Eagler, Charles L. Freeman, Joseph McMillan Johnson, Clarence Slifer and James G. Stewart.

== Filmography ==
- The Sharkfighters (1956)
- The Kentuckian (1955)
- Beachhead (1954)
- Vera Cruz (1954)
- The Yellow Tomahawk (1954)
- The Diamond Queen (1953)
- Bwana Devil (1952)
- The Crimson Pirate (1952)
- Hans Christian Andersen (1952)
- Portrait of Jennie (1948)
- It's a Wonderful Life (1946)

== Death ==
According to Shearman's May 8, 1956 obituary in the Los Angeles Times, he was "electrocuted while repairing equipment used for a film being made on the Isle of Pines in Cuba". The Times describes him as an Academy Award winning special effects man “credited with the development of many machines and gadgets used in motion-picture production”. It states he was serving as chief technician on the picture The Sharkfighters, an account of the U.S. Navy's efforts to develop an effective shark repellent. Shearman was not an underwater cameraman, and there is no indication he was working as one while electrocuted.
