= Rose McClendon =

American actress (1884–1936)

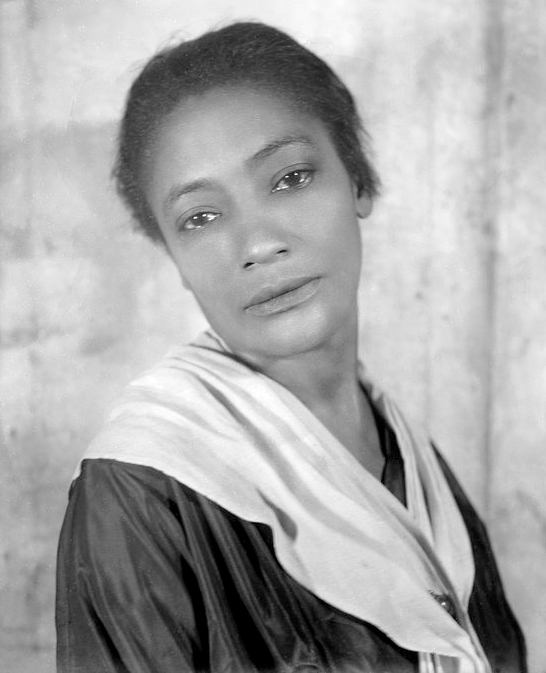
- Rose McClendon as Serena in Porgy (1927)
- Born: Rosalie Virginia Scott; August 27, 1884; Greenville, South Carolina, U.S.
- Died: July 12, 1936 (aged 51); New York City, U.S.
- Resting place: Mount Hope Cemetery (Hastings-on-Hudson)
- Spouse: Henry Pruden McClendon (m. 1904)

Rose McClendon (August 27, 1884 – July 12, 1936) was a leading African-American Broadway actress of the 1920s. A founder of the Negro People's Theatre, she guided the creation of the Federal Theatre Project's African American theatre units nationwide and briefly co-directed the New York Negro Theater Unit.

== Biography ==
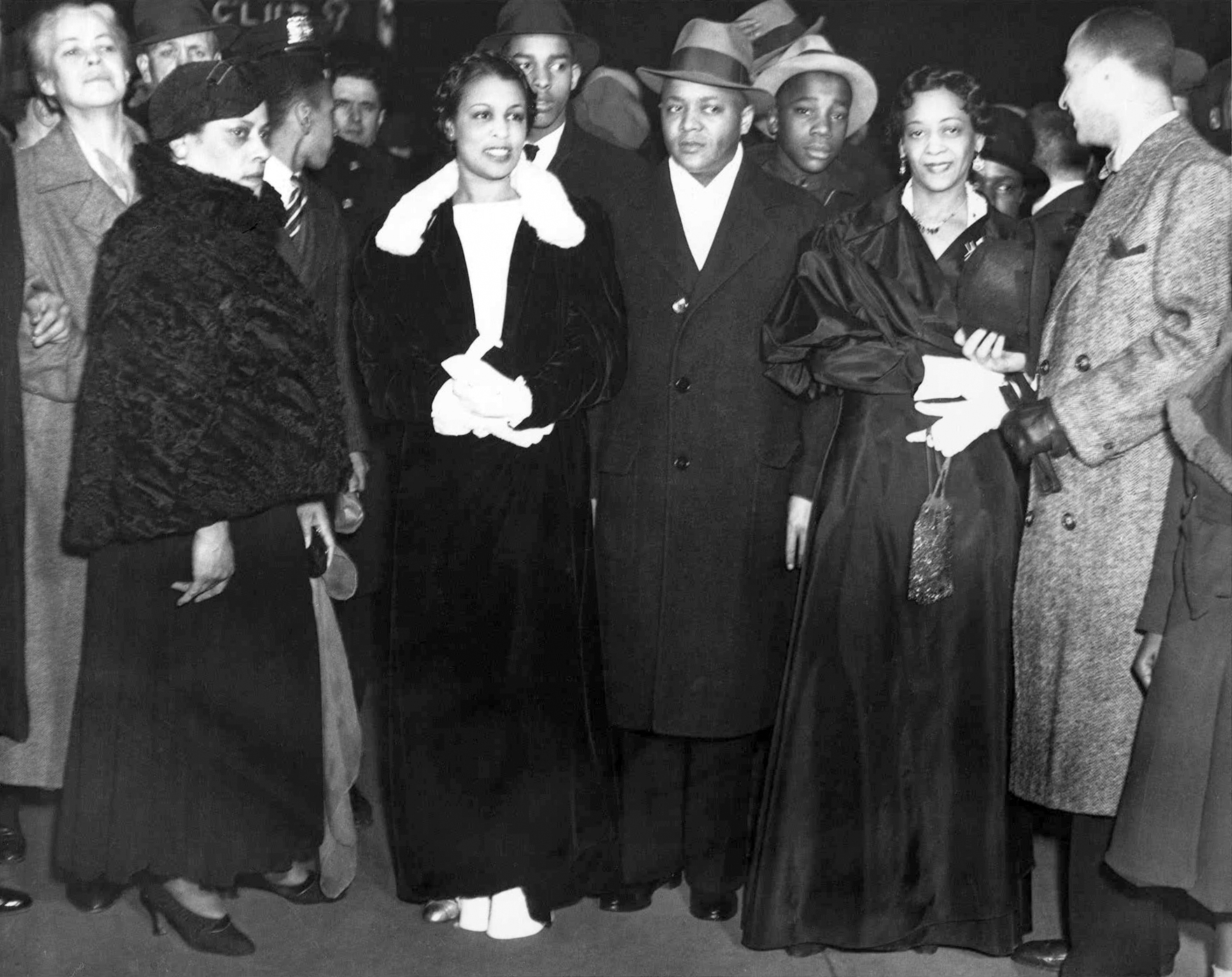
McClendon, second from right, at the opening of Macbeth (April 14, 1936)

Rose McClendon was born as Rosalie Virginia Scott in Greenville, South Carolina, and as a child relocated to New York City. She started acting in church plays in her youth. She became a professional actress in her thirties, after winning a scholarship to the American Academy of Dramatic Art.

At age 20 she was married to Dr. Henry Pruden McClendon, a chiropractor.

Her first notable role came in Deep River, a "native opera with jazz", in 1926. In addition to acting, she also directed several plays at the Harlem Experimental Theatre. She appeared in the 1927 Pulitzer Prize-winning play In Abraham's Bosom by Paul Green. In 1931, she was in another Paul Green play on Broadway, The House of Connelly, which was the first production by the Group Theatre, directed by Lee Strasberg. She drew critical praise for her portrayal of Phyllis in Annie Nathan Meyer's Black Souls at Broadway's Provincetown Playhouse in 1932.

McClendon was a contemporary of Paul Robeson, Ethel Barrymore, Lynn Fontanne and Langston Hughes, who created a character for her in his 1935 play, Mulatto.

As a showcase for McClendon, Countee Cullen adapted Euripides' tragedy Medea, working with producer John Houseman, composer Virgil Thomson and production designer Chick Austin. Although the sets and costumes had been ready for months, by the end of 1934 McClendon had fallen ill and the project was never realized.

Her talent extended to directing as well as acting. In 1935 she co-founded, with Dick Campbell, the Negro People's Theatre in Harlem. More than 4,000 people attended its first production, an adaptation of Clifford Odets' Waiting for Lefty, and the group was organized in permanent form in June.

The Negro People's Theatre directly inspired the Negro Theatre Unit of the Federal Theatre Project, which was created in 1935 under McClendon's supervision. Under her guidance units were created in Seattle, Hartford, Philadelphia, Newark, Los Angeles, Boston, Raleigh, Birmingham, San Francisco and Chicago as well as New York. She served as liaison to numerous organizations and individuals who became involved in the Federal Theatre Project, including Harry Edward, Carlton Moss and Edna Thomas. McClendon advised national director Hallie Flanagan that the project should begin under experienced direction and selected John Houseman to co-direct the unit.

In December 1935, McClendon was forced to leave the cast of Langston Hughes's Mulatto after she became critically ill with pleurisy. McClendon was to have portrayed Lady Macbeth in Orson Welles's Federal Theatre Project production of Macbeth (1936), but due to her continuing illness Edna Thomas played the role. Her condition later developed into pneumonia, and McClendon died at her home on July 12, 1936.

== Legacy ==
After McClendon's death in 1936, Dick Campbell, her Negro People's Theater co-founder, formed the Rose McClendon Players in her honor.

In 1946, Carl Van Vechten established the Rose McClendon Memorial Collection of Photographs of Celebrated Negroes at Howard University. The collection is held in the prints and photographs department of Moorland–Spingarn Research Center.

In 1950, the estate of McClendon's husband donated her scrapbooks to the New York Public Library. Two volumes dated 1916–34 include newspaper and magazine articles and reviews, programs, letters, telegrams and photographs.

In 2021, a biopic titled Voodoo Macbeth, produced by the USC School of Cinematic Arts and chronicling the creation of the New York Negro Unit 1936 production of Macbeth co-directed by McClendon, premiered at the Pan-African Film Festival. The film stars Inger Tudor as McClendon.

== Select theatre credits ==
Date	Title	Role	Notes
1919–20	Justice		Professional debut
1924	Roseanne		
October 4–30, 1926	Deep River	Octavie	Imperial Theatre, New York
December 30, 1926–June 1927	In Abraham's Bosom	Goldie McAllister	Provincetown Playhouse, New York
September 6–November 1927	In Abraham's Bosom	Goldie McAllister	Provincetown Playhouse, New York
October 10, 1927–August 1928	Porgy	Serena	Guild Theatre, New York
1928–29	Porgy	Serena	Tour including nine weeks in Chicago, six weeks in London, and performances in Boston, Philadelphia, Cincinnati, Washington, Cleveland, Pittsburgh, Baltimore, Detroit, San Francisco, Los Angeles, and cities in the northwestern United States and Canada
September 13–October 1929	Porgy	Serena	Martin Beck Theatre, New York
October 14, 1929 – January 1930	Porgy	Serena	National tour
September 28–December 1931	The House of Connelly	Big Sue	Martin Beck Theatre, New York
January 7–January 1932	Never No More	Mammy	Hudson Theatre, New York
March 30–April 1932	Black Souls	Phyllis	Provincetown Playhouse, New York
April 4–April 1932	Brain Sweat	Carrie Washington	Longacre Theatre, New York
October 2–October 1934	Roll, Sweet Chariot	Sudie Wilson	Cort Theatre, New York
March 14–16, 1935	Panic	Old Woman	Imperial Theatre, New York
October 24–December 5, 1935	Mulatto	Cora Lewis	Vanderbilt Theatre, New York
