= Marty Martin =

Marty Martin may refer to:

- Marty Martin (Wyoming politician) (born 1951), former Wyoming politician
- Earl F. Martin (born 1961), known as Marty, American lawyer, academic and president of Drake University
- Marty Martin (special effects artist) (1897–1964), of RKO Pictures
- Marty Martin (playwright), author of Gertrude Stein, Gertrude Stein, Gertrude Stein, a 1982 PBS one-woman play
