= The Sharkfighters =

1956 film by Jerry Hopper

- Directed by: Jerry Hopper
- Screenplay by: Jonathan Robinson; Lawrence Roman
- Story by: Art Napoleon; Jo Napoleon
- Produced by: Samuel Goldwyn Jr.
- Starring: Victor Mature; Karen Steele; James Olson; Philip Coolidge
- Cinematography: Lee Garmes
- Edited by: Daniel Mandell
- Music by: Jerome Moross
- Production company: Formosa Productions
- Distributed by: United Artists
- Release date: November 17, 1956
- Running time: 73 minutes
- Country: United States
- Language: English

The Sharkfighters is a 1956 American adventure film starring Victor Mature, supported by Karen Steele, James Olson, and Claude Akins. Directed by Jerry Hopper, its fictional storyline is based on the invention of "Shark Chaser", an historical shark repellent developed by U.S. Navy researchers during World War II.

It was one of the first films to focus on sharks.

== Plot ==
In August 1943, Lt. Commander Ben Staves (Mature) arrives on a tiny island offshore of Cuba to join an in-progress Navy test seeking to develop a shark repellant. The small research team there has been led for ten months by Lt. Commander Leonard "Len" Evans (Coolidge), an ichthyologist formerly with the Scripps Institution, assisted by a chemist, Ensign "Dunk" Duncan (Olson), and a cameraman, Chief Petty Officer "Gordy" Gordon (Akins).

Staves is recovering from the sinking of his destroyer in battle in the Pacific, followed by 13 traumatic days adrift during which over half his surviving crew was killed in shark attacks. He assures Evans that he is there to help him, not take over the project. When Evans tells him they'll get started "first thing in the morning", Ben counters with "Why not now?". The team heads out into the bay on a small fishing boat crewed by a local skipper and a teenage deckhand Carlos (Campos). Evans advises that the project has already tested over 200 methods, including poisons, repulsive odors, color clouds, and ultrasonics, none of which has a lasting effect in keeping sharks away from dead fish dangled in the water as human proxies. Today's test using copper acetate is initially successful until the repellant cloud dissipates after a few minutes.

Ben reviews Evans's reports, chafing at the slowness of the numerous trials, but Evans defends his efforts, saying their work has been only 80% effective because they don't have human test subjects. Ben suggests that they test other methods simultaneously. Evans resents Ben's emphasis on urgency over carefully drawn scientific conclusions. To achieve both, Ben orders that they will work seven days a week, even though his gorgeous young wife Martha (Steele) - whom he had not seen in three years - is staying 65 miles away in Havana.

Two weeks into the next series of tests they have compiled 72 consecutive positive results. Ben is excited and wants to submit the results to Navy uplines; Evans resists, arguing they are still short of the 100 test target. Ben pulls rank and makes it an order. In the excitement of a seeming success Carlos begins to clown around, trips, and falls overboard. Sharks immediately appear and everyone shouts for him to swim to the still intact repellant cloud. He does, but panics and stabs a shark that ventures too close, drawing a pack that ravages him before he can be hoisted aboard.

Shaking off the death, Ben prods a reluctant and demoralized Evans to resume a prior repellent candidate, octopod ink. Duncan concocts a synthetic formula and adds it to their previous combination of copper acetate mixed with water-soluble wax to slow dissipation in the water. Ben promises not to rush Evans' testing, but insists that he will volunteer as a guinea pig once the 100 tests on fish carcasses are complete.

Ben goes to Havana to request the naval attaché there (Neise) to assign two expert riflemen to the project. Suspicious, the official maneuvers Ben into revealing his plan to play human shark bait and advises him to seek Navy approval first; Ben soft-pedals that they're still just setting up preliminary plans.

The results of the ink tests are highly positive. So much so that Ben orders a final one for the next day, well short of the agreed number. Evans argues but begrudgingly acquiesces. With his brand new bodyguards on board for the 1st time, Ben enters the water and methodically begins to dissolve a hard-pressed cake of repellant in the water by waving it around the way a downed flier would. It appears to works effectively...but so did the one without the squid ink until Carlos had panicked, stabbed a shark, put blood in the water, and set off a feeding frenzy. More single sharks swim by Ben, but they seem to be keeping somewhat more distance than previously, though Ben is also remaining calm, unlike the screaming and thrashing Carlos.

A lookout then sights a group a bit off, which work their way to Ben, then reports a whole pack are approaching. With that a marksman nervously shoots a shark, putting blood in the water and setting the animals off. As Ben makes his way toward the boat he is frantically showered by Evans with a gusher of extra repellent pumped straight from the barrel, hundreds of times more than a downed flier could ever release at once dissolving his cake of repellant. He is pulled aboard just in time. Handed a beer, he pauses while guzzling - equal parts dazed, terrified, and relieved - to confirm he intends to drink several more.

== Cast ==
- Victor Mature as Lt. Commander Ben Staves
- Karen Steele as Martha Staves
- James Olson as Ensign Harold Duncan
- Philip Coolidge as Lt. Commander Leonard Evans
- Claude Akins as Chief "Gordy" Gordon
- Rafael Campos as Carlos
- George Neise as Commander George Zimmer

== Production ==
Samuel Goldwyn Jr. produced the film for Formosa Productions, which released through United Artists. It was Goldwyn Jr's second film, following Man with the Gun. He announced it in December 1954, based on a script by Art and Jo Napoleon. It was called Sharkfighter.

It was based on actual events involving the creation of the Navy's shark repellent, "Shark Chaser", a cake combining copper acetate to mimic putrefied shark tissue, black dye as a camouflage agent, and a water-soluble wax binder as described in the script, which some sources attribute to efforts of Julia Child while working for the Office of Strategic Services during World War II.

"Shark Chaser" was announced as a successful repellent as early as May 7, 1943. A patent application was made in October 1944 and granted in 1949 to four scientists who also designed the packet, and the product was issued by the Navy until 1973. However its effectiveness is now judged dubious (as is the shark threat inspiring its development) by the Navy's Bureau of Medicine and Surgery. The actual scientific work consisted of observations of shark behavior in 1942 off Mayport, Florida; Woods Hole, Massachusetts; and the harbor of Guayaquil, Ecuador by civilian scientists of the Marine Studios oceanarium.

Lawrence Roman and John Robinson rewrote the screenplay.

Victor Mature signed to play the lead in December 1955. By this stage, Goldwyn Jr had a camera crew shooting shark footage for several months, although filming did not begin on the film proper until March 1956.

Karen Steele and James Olson, who appeared in the cast, were signed to long-term contracts by Goldwyn.

=== Filming ===
The Sharkfighters was filmed in CinemaScope and Technicolor on location in Cuba with an opening narration by Charles Collingwood and released in November 1956 by United Artists. Shooting mostly look place on the Isle of Pines, south of the main island.

Special effects artist Russell Shearman was electrocuted while repairing film equipment used for the movie. He had received the 1946 Special Effects Oscar for creating a more realistic and filming-friendly artificial snow in It's a Wonderful Life, and one in 1948 for effects in the reincarnation fantasy Portrait of Jennie, and was "credited with the development of many machines and gadgets used in motion-picture production". The Times states he was serving as chief technician on the picture. Shearman was not an underwater cameraman, and there is no indication he was working as one while electrocuted.

Mature later admitted he did not enjoy filming the action sequences.

== Score ==
The music for The Sharkfighters was composed by Jerome Moross, described as "lively and unique." While it is not known if he traveled to Cuba with the company, the distinctly ethnic themes of the music appear to be inspired by the filming on location, using syncopation and percussion instruments highly suggestive of his orchestral composition Biguine.

Thematically the score is characterized by an ostinato that stresses the second half of the second beat but nothing at all on the third beat. This rhythm is employed throughout the varied scene melodies using maracas, xylophones, guitars, claves, and bongos to produce a Caribbean motif. In the Havana night club scene he integrates a rumba into the score, then segues to a soft melody underscoring the dialogue between Martha and Len. Also notable is a "unique cue" to announce the presence of sharks. The score of The Sharkfighters displays the fully developed elements of style now associated with Moross in Westerns such as The Big Country, which he moved on to after this film.

== Release ==
Sam Goldwyn Jr later said of the film, "we spent a year and a half doing the big scene and I'm afraid I didn't function so well on the story aspect." He admitted the film "fell flat on its face" commercially.

== Adaptations ==
The film was adapted as the Dell Comics comic book Four Color #762 (Jan. 1957), cover-titled The Sharkfighters. The 34-page story, by an unknown writer, was penciled and inked by John Buscema.

== See also ==
- List of American films of 1956
