= Mulatto (play) =

Play by Langston Hughes (1935)

- Written by: Langston Hughes
- Characters: Robert Lewis; Colonel Norwood; Cora Lewis; Sallie Lewis; Fred Higgins; William Lewis; assorted black servants and white townspeople
- Original language: English
- Subject: anti-black racism in the US South
- Genre: tragedy
- Setting: 1930s Georgia plantation

Premiere
- Date premiered: October 24, 1935
- Place premiered: Vanderbilt Theatre

Mulatto: A Tragedy of the Deep South is a tragic play about race issues in the American south by Langston Hughes. It was produced on Broadway in 1935 by Martin Jones, where it ran for 11 months and 373 performances. It is one of the earliest Broadway plays to combine father-son conflict with race issues.

== Plot ==
Act One

- On the Norwood Plantation in Polk County, Georgia, Colonel Thomas Norwood (described by Hughes as a "plantation owner, a still vigorous man of about sixty") and Cora Lewis ("a brown woman in her forties who has kept the house and been the mistress of Colonel Norwood for some thirty years") have four children together. They are: William, who still lives on the plantation and who has a son of his own; two daughters, Bertha and Sallie, who are light enough to pass for white; and Robert, a.k.a. Bert, who is 18 and who has Norwood's facial features. Robert has been away at an all-Colored school since he was a young boy and is visiting the plantation for the first time in many years. In Act One, we learn through a conversation between Mr. Higgins and Colonel Norwood that Robert, or Bert, has been refusing to follow all the expected behaviors for Mulatto people and has been asserting himself as Norwood's heir, much to the shock of the local townspeople. Norwood is angered by this assertion. The conversation between the two plantation owners also gives insight to the perspective and lifestyle of these characters. Cora, meanwhile, is revealed to have secretly sent her daughters to secretarial school, so that they can move up north and have good jobs, but has been telling the Colonel that they are learning to be cooks. It is also revealed through a conversation between William and Cora that Bert was the Colonel's favorite of all the children he fathered with Cora, until Bert called him "papa" which resulted in Norwood severely beating Bert when he was seven. This led to the decision for Norwood to send Bert off to school. This only emboldened Bert further, as he witnessed the better treatment of Black folks in the Northern states. Act One concludes with Cora expressing concern to Bert over his behavior, when the Colonel enters. Bert rebelliously exits through the front door, which enrages the Colonel. Then the curtain falls.

Act Two

- Scene 1: Cora calls in Robert and leaves him alone to speak with Norwood. Norwood tells Robert he is to leave his property for his behavior, bringing out his pistol as a threat. Norwood tells Robert that his overseer Talbot and the storekeeper are coming to ensure that Robert leaves. Robert and Norwood get into a heated argument that ends with Robert strangling Norwood and taking his gun. Cora comes in and tells Robert to run away as he will most certainly be executed when found. When Talbot and the storekeeper arrive at the house and find Norwood's corpse they call for help and immediately begin a search for Robert. The scene concludes with a monologue from Cora lamenting what transpired between Robert and Norwood. She speaks to Norwood's corpse and scolds him for never acknowledging Bert as his son, and for not being able to protect him now. She curses him and blames him for Robert's life currently being in danger.
- Scene 2: Sam leads the undertaker into the house to retrieve Colonel Norwood's body, and demands Cora to get him a drink. Cora refuses claiming she only takes orders from Norwood, to the astonishment of Sam. The undertaker's helper (a voice offstage) convinces him to leave the premises and join the mob in search for Robert. After they leave Sam realizes he has an opportunity to escape and seizes it. William decides to leave the property, fearful of getting caught up in the violence of the mob hunting Robert. He asks Cora to go with them but she refuses and stays behind to wait for Robert. Cora is clearly unstable and throughout the scene, she speaks to Norwood as if he were alive and in the room with her. She reflects upon her relationship with the Colonel, from the first time they laid together, to her becoming his pseudo wife. She then speaks about the children she bore with him, focusing on Robert. She tells Colonel Norwood he died the day that he beat Robert for calling him papa. Robert shows up back at the house, the sounds of the lynch mob close behind. He goes upstairs and wishes his mother goodnight. He kills himself with the Colonel's gun as the mob breaks into the house to seize him.

== Characters ==
- Colonel Thomas Norwood: originally played by Stuart Beebe. Norwood is 60 years old. He is a quick-tempered and a commanding colonel. His wife is dead so he took up Cora as a lover and fathered 4 of the mulatto children, but he refuses to acknowledge them as his own, even though he allows them to go to school. He is also Cora's boss. Cora's mother helped raise him. He cares greatly about what people think of him.
- Cora Lewis: originally played by Rose McClendon. She is Norwood's mistress. Cora met Norwood when she was 15, which is when they first had sexual relations. Her relationship with Norwood is encouraged by her mother on the grounds that her life would be better with him than if she stayed in the fields. She lives with him separate to the other servants. She has four children with him. She did not move into the house until Norwood's wife died, at that point she was carrying their first child William. She knows her "place" in this hostile and racist world and cares for her family's survival over everything. She even risks her safety for the salvation of her children by sending them off to school. By the end of the play, she has become more defiant against the white people, refusing to answer Talbot.
- William Lewis: originally played by Morris McKenney. Cora's oldest child. Works on the plantation and has a wife and child of his own.
- Sallie Lewis: originally played by Jeanne Green. Cora's second daughter, she is very fair skinned and can pass for white.
- Robert Lewis: originally played by Hurst Amyx. Robert is the youngest son of Cora, and he is rebellious. He stands up for his rights, doesn't want to bow down to the "whites," even though his mother asks him not to be rebellious because she wants him to be safe and alive. Robert is the only one who wants things to change, the rest just want to be safe. Being explicit about his desire for change is very dangerous, and he scolds those who suffer mistreatment in silence claiming this is the only way to enact change.
- Fred Higgins: originally played by Frank Jaquet. A friend of Norwood's, and owner of a neighboring plantation. A typically Southern and elderly man.
- Sam: Sam is a servant that does everything he is told to do by Norwood. He is loyal to Norwood, and he will tell on anyone who does not obey Norwood's orders. Even though he is loyal to Norwood, he is relived from all his fear after he finds our Norwood is dead.
- Billy: William Lewis's son
- Talbot: originally played by John Boyd. He is the overseer of the Black people that work on Norwood's plantation. Always angry and wanting to punish them for the most minuscule mistakes.
- Mose: Mr. Higgins' chauffeur
- Storekeeper: originally played by Clark Poth
- Undertaker: originally played by Howard Negley. The undertaker's job was to remove the body. He likes to drink, Yells for Cora to get liquor but she doesn't because she doesn't work for him. He is a man who is probably white due to the way he treats Cora.
- Undertaker's Helper: Voice off stage only
- The Mob: Group that hunts Robert after Colonel Norwood's death.

== Reception ==
Historian Joseph McLaren notes that the play was popular with audiences because they were intrigued by the tragic mulatto theme. Critics, however, were more negative, perhaps in part because director/producer Martin Jones altered much of the plot, moving the play away from tragedy and into melodrama. Melinda D. Wilson notes that Jones's addition of a rape scene may have helped sell tickets, but also may have reinforced stereotypes of violent and promiscuous blacks—the kinds of stereotypes that Negro and Mulatto writers of the time were trying to stamp out.

== Themes ==
The play includes themes in addition to the "tragic mulatto". Including the father and son conflict, racial miscegenation, and "intercaste prejudice". "Intracaste prejudice" refers to the ways some Negro/Mulatto people of the time held prejudices against other Negro/Mulattoes. Literary scholar Germain J. Bienvenu argues that the play examines this prejudice through the character of Robert. "Bert" neglects the embrace of the Black community in favor of attempting to assimilate into the white community. The father and son conflict is present and interwoven with the "mulatto" theme through the relationship between Bert and Colonel Thomas Norwood, specifically Bert's desire for Colonel to recognize him as a white son, and the Colonel's refusal to do so. This is what makes Robert such a tragic mulatto figure, similar to other characters in prevalent in Langston Hughes' work. The theme of "plantation culture" is also evident in the play because of its setting. Plantation culture refers to the structural, economic and cultural effects had on the American South, and how this culture has led to the continuation of the mistreatment of African Americans in the South. The plantation of the American South is designed to divide race and maintain the power held by white owners through both socially and architecturally. The presence or existence of "plantation culture" perpetuates the racial divide even outside of the setting.
