= Frank McCarthy (producer) =

United States Army general

Frank McCarthy (June 8, 1912 – December 1, 1986) was the secretary of the General Staff of the United States Department of War during World War II; briefly United States Assistant Secretary of State for Administration in 1945; and later a distinguished film producer, whose production Patton won the 1970 Academy Award for Best Picture.

== Biography ==
=== Early years, 1912–1940 ===
Frank McCarthy was born near Richmond, Virginia, on June 8, 1912. He attended John Marshall High School and then the Virginia Military Institute, graduating in 1933.

After graduating from the Virginia Military Institute, McCarthy worked as a reporter for the Richmond News Leader. He then moved to New York City and became the press agent for legendary Broadway theater producer George Abbott's Brother Rat (1937), a farce about students at the Virginia Military Institute. (In 1938, Brother Rat was made into a film starring Priscilla Lane and Wayne Morris. Ronald Reagan was cast in a minor role, and it was during this film shoot that Reagan met his future wife Jane Wyman.)

=== Career during World War II, 1940–1945 ===
In mid-1940, following the Fall of France to invasion by Nazi Germany, McCarthy enlisted in the United States Army Reserve. By 1941, McCarthy had attained the rank of colonel and was aide-de-camp to the Chief of Staff of the United States Army, General George C. Marshall. According to Andrew Roberts' book Masters and Commanders (HarperCollins, 2009) McCarthy was homosexual, a fact unknown to Marshall who kept on introducing him to attractive young women. Roberts cites no source for this.

From 1943 to 1945, McCarthy served as the secretary of the General Staff of the United States Department of War. For his service in World War II, McCarthy was awarded the Distinguished Service Medal, the Legion of Merit, and was made an Officer of the Most Excellent Order of the British Empire. He left the Army with the rank of brigadier general.

Shortly after the end of the war, President of the United States Harry Truman named McCarthy Assistant Secretary of State for Administration under United States Secretary of State James F. Byrnes. Only 33 years old at the time, McCarthy is thus the youngest Assistant Secretary of State in United States history. However, he only held the office as a placeholder, from September 1, 1945, until October 11, 1945, when he was replaced by Donald S. Russell.

=== Producer, 1945–1986 ===
After the war, McCarthy moved to Hollywood and became a film producer, first for 20th Century Fox, then for Universal Studios. In 1951, Decision Before Dawn, a spy picture that McCarthy produced with Anatole Litvak was nominated for the Academy Award for Best Picture. He later produced Sailor of the King (1953) and A Guide for the Married Man (1967).

McCarthy spent nearly twenty years working on a biographical film of General George S. Patton. This film, Patton, (1970) was directed by Franklin J. Schaffner and starred George C. Scott as Patton. In 1971, at the 43rd Academy Awards, Patton won the Academy Award for Best Picture (with McCarthy, as the film's producer, accepting the award); Schaffner won the Academy Award for Best Director; and Scott won the Academy Award for Best Actor. Scott refused to attend the 43rd Academy Awards, so McCarthy accepted Scott's Oscar on Scott's behalf. The next day, Scott refused his Oscar (the first actor to do so) and McCarthy therefore returned it to the Academy of Motion Picture Arts and Sciences.

McCarthy planned a Tom Swift feature movie in 1968, to be directed by Gene Kelly. A script was written and approved, and filming was to have begun during 1969. However, the project was canceled by 20th Century Fox owing to the poor reception of the movies Doctor Dolittle and Star!, despite a $500,000 airship being built as a prop. After the release of Patton, McCarthy continued to work on a script to be filmed on a lower budget.

McCarthy later produced an early TV movie, Fireball Forward, a 1972 war drama. In 1977, he produced the film MacArthur, an account of General Douglas MacArthur's life from 1942 to 1952 starring Gregory Peck.

McCarthy died of cancer on December 1, 1986, at the Motion Picture & Television Country House and Hospital in Woodland Hills, Los Angeles, at the age of 74.

Government offices
Preceded by Julius C. Holmes	Assistant Secretary of State for Administration; September 1, 1945 – October 11, 1945	Succeeded by Donald S. Russell
