= Portrait of Jennie (novella) =

1940 novel by Robert Nathan

- First US edition
- Author: Robert Nathan
- Language: English
- Genre: Mystery, fantasy, supernatural
- Publisher: A. A. Knopf (US); The Ryerson Press (Canada)
- Publication date: 1940
- Publication place: United States
- Media type: Print (Hardcover)
- Pages: 212
- Preceded by: Winter in April
- Followed by: They Went on Together

Portrait of Jennie is a novel by American writer Robert Nathan, first published in 1940. This story combines romance, fantasy, mystery, and the supernatural. The most successful of Nathan's books, it is considered a modern masterpiece of fantasy fiction.

Judith Merril called Portrait of Jennie "one of the most durable successes in the fantasy business," and Ray Bradbury wrote of the book, "It touched and frightened me when I was twenty-four. Now, once more, it touches and frightens."

== Plot summary ==
A struggling Depression-era artist encounters a young girl in a park who inspires him to paint portraits instead of landscapes. As he repeatedly encounters the girl, each time she is several years older, and is apparently "slipping through time."

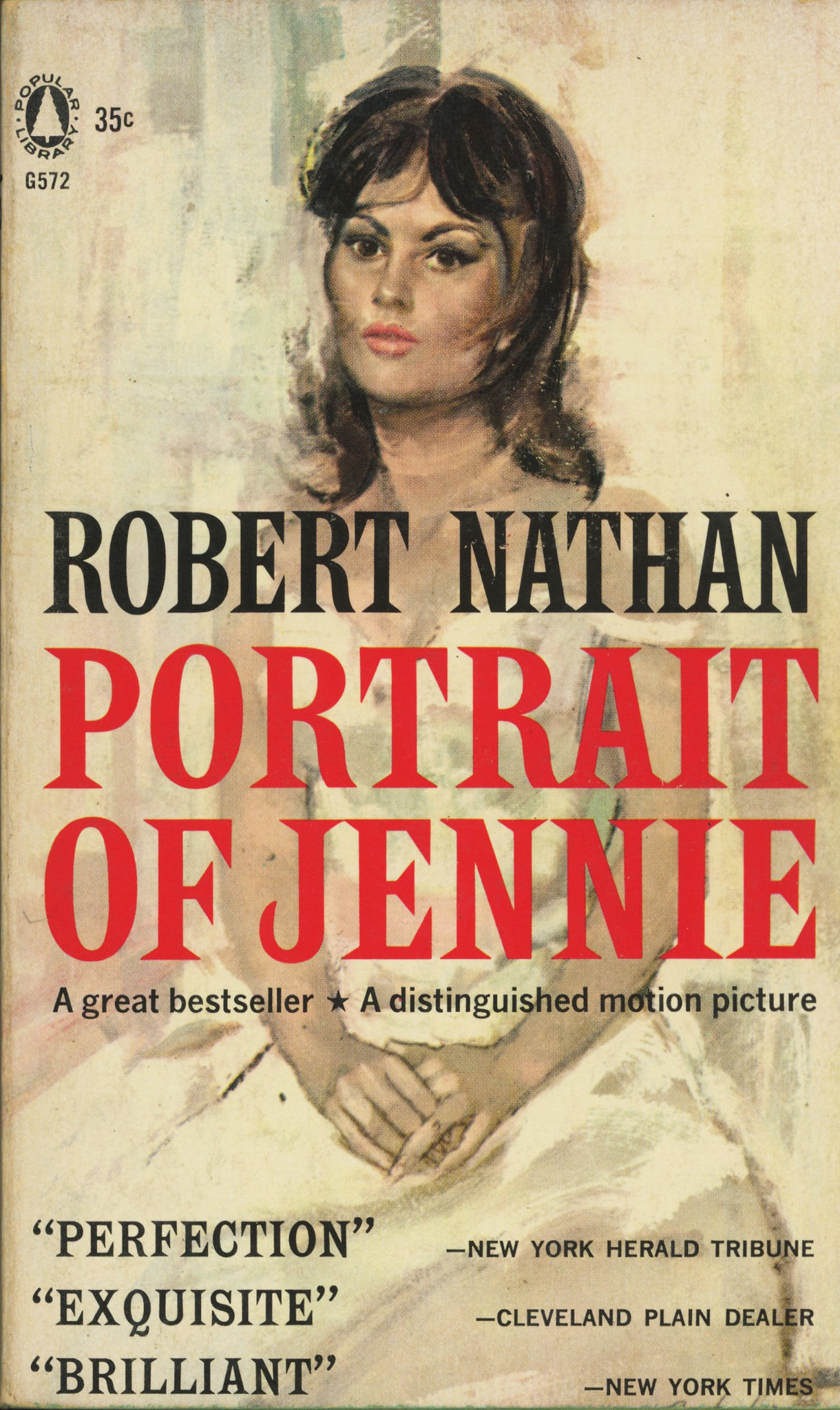
Cover of a 1962 edition (Popular Library)

== Adaptations in other media ==
A half-hour radio adaptation of the novella was presented in 1946 on the CBS Radio show Academy Award Theater, with Joan Fontaine and John Lund.

The film rights to the book were obtained by David O. Selznick, and in 1948 he produced a film starring Jennifer Jones and Joseph Cotten.

In addition, Lux Radio Theatre presented an hour-long adaptation of the film on October 31, 1949, again starring Joseph Cotten, but this time Anne Baxter in the role of Jennie.
