= In Abraham's Bosom =

Play written by Paul Green

- 1926 first edition
- Original language: English
- Written by: Paul Green
- Characters: Abraham McCranie; Puny Avery; Eddie Williams; Neilly McNeill; Colonel McCranie; Douglas McCranie; Lanie Horton; Goldie McAllister; Muh Mack; Lije Hunneycutt; Lonnie McCranie; Bud Gaskins
- Genre: Tragedy
- Setting: In and Near the Turpentine Woods in Eastern North Carolina in the summer of 1885

Premiere
- Date: December 30, 1926
- Place: Provincetown Playhouse; New York City, New York

In Abraham's Bosom is a play by American dramatist Paul Green. He was based in North Carolina and wrote historical plays about the South.

== Production ==
In Abraham's Bosom premiered Off-Broadway at the Provincetown Playhouse on December 30, 1926, and closed on June 18, 1927, after 200 performances. Directed by Jasper Deeter, the cast starred Jules Bledsoe as Abraham McCranie, L. Rufus Hill (Colonel McCranie), H. Ben Smith (Lonnie McCranie), Rose McClendon (Goldie McAllister), Abbie Mitchell (Muh Mack), and R. J. Huey (Douglas McCranie). Abraham is a mixed-race, African-American farmer from North Carolina whose efforts at self-improvement are thwarted by the state's racial segregation and Jim Crow rules.

Green received the 1927 Pulitzer Prize for Drama. The Pulitzer jury stated: "The play does not sentimentalize on the tragic situation of the negro. It is scrupulously fair to the white race. But it brings us face to face with one of the most serious of the social problems of this country, and forces us to view this problem in the light of tragic pity."

The play was included in Burns Mantle's The Best Plays of 1926–1927.

The Provincetown Playhouse remounted the show on September 6, 1927, with Frank H. Wilson in the role of Abe McCranie.

A British production of In Abraham's Bosom premiered on 7 December 1930 at The Holborn Empire in London. Produced by Leonard Gibson-Cowan for The Masses Stage and Film Guild.

== Plot ==
The play takes place in the Southeast of the United States, from 1885 to the beginning of the 20th century.

Abe McCranie is a mixed-race African-American field worker, the son of Colonel McCranie, a white man. He tries to start a school to educate black children, as they were underserved by the state. Ultimately, he gets a school, but the white people run him out of it and drive him to murder.
