= Patton (film) =

1970 film by Franklin J. Schaffner

- Theatrical release poster
- Directed by: Franklin J. Schaffner
- Screenplay by: Francis Ford Coppola; Edmund H. North
- Based on: Patton: Ordeal and Triumph by Ladislas Farago; A Soldier's Story by Omar N. Bradley
- Produced by: Frank McCarthy
- Starring: George C. Scott; Karl Malden
- Cinematography: Fred J. Koenekamp
- Edited by: Hugh Fowler
- Music by: Jerry Goldsmith
- Color process: DeLuxe
- Distributed by: 20th Century-Fox
- Release dates: February 5, 1970 (New York City); April 2, 1970 (United States)
- Running time: 172 minutes
- Country: United States
- Language: English
- Budget: $12.6 million
- Box office: $61.7 million

Patton is a 1970 American epic biographical war film about U.S. General George S. Patton during World War II. It stars George C. Scott as Patton and Karl Malden as General Omar Bradley. The film was directed by Franklin J. Schaffner from a script by Francis Ford Coppola and Edmund H. North, who based their screenplay on Patton: Ordeal and Triumph by Ladislas Farago and Bradley's memoir, A Soldier's Story.

Patton premiered in New York City on February 5, 1970 before being released by 20th Century-Fox on April 2, 1970. The film grossed $61.7 million against a budget of $12 million. It won seven Academy Awards, including Best Picture, Best Director and Best Original Screenplay. Scott also won the Best Actor for his performance, though he declined the award.

The opening monologue, delivered by Scott as General Patton with an enormous American flag behind him, remains an iconic and often quoted image in film. In 2003, Patton was selected for preservation in the United States National Film Registry by the Library of Congress, who deemed it "culturally, historically or aesthetically significant". The Academy Film Archive also preserved Patton in 2003.

== Plot ==
A fully dressed General Patton in full uniform stands on a stage in front of an oversized American flag strongly illuminated as his only background as he presents an unapologetic proclamation of American greatness, of which he considers himself a proud supporter.

During World War II, the II Corps suffers a severe defeat at the Battle of Kasserine Pass in North Africa. Hard-charging General George S. Patton is sent to take command; he reorganizes the corps, and imposes strict but necessary discipline. Frustrated by what he perceives as British commander Bernard Montgomery monopolization of the Allied effort—Montgomery's forces had chased Rommel's forces and thus relieved pressure on the Americans following Kasserine—Patton leads the corps to redemption at the Battle of El Guettar.

Following Allied victory in North Africa, Patton and Montgomery propose competing plans for the Allied invasion of Sicily. Patton recommends landing his U.S. Seventh Army near Palermo. Commanding officer Harold Alexander opts for Montgomery's more cautious plan, landing Patton’s forces at Gela. Although initially intended to support Montgomery, Patton pushes northwest, taking Palermo and racing to Messina before the British. During the campaign, he visits a field hospital and slaps a soldier for cowardice, sparking public outrage and requiring a formal apology.

Patton is then sidelined by Eisenhower for the Allied invasion of France and placed in command of the fictitious First United States Army Group in London, a decoy to mislead the Germans about the main invasion location. At a public gathering in Knutsford, Patton remarks that the postwar world will be dominated by Anglo-Americans, alarming Allied leaders. George Marshall must decide whether Patton's comments warrant sending him home in disgrace.

Weeks after the Normandy landings, Patton takes command of the Third Army, reporting to his former subordinate, Omar Bradley. Under his leadership, the Third Army sweeps across France, but is forced to halt before entering Germany due to fuel and supply allocations to Montgomery's forces for Operation Market Garden. Frustrated, Patton confronts Bradley, who warns him again about the dangers of speaking freely.

During the Battle of the Bulge, Patton's staff plans a bold operation to relieve the trapped 101st Airborne Division in Bastogne. After Germany capitulates, Patton's candid comparisons of American politics to Nazism create further controversy, and he is relieved of command of the Third Army. He is retained to help oversee the occupation of Germany. In the film's closing sequence, Patton narrowly avoids a fatal accident while walking with his bull terrier, and his voiceover reflects on the transitional nature of glory, especially that achieved through military conquest:

For over a thousand years, Roman conquerors returning from the wars enjoyed the honor of a triumph—a tumultuous parade. In the procession came trumpeters and musicians and strange animals from the conquered territories, together with carts laden with treasure and captured armaments. The conqueror rode in a triumphal chariot, the dazed prisoners walking in chains before him. Sometimes his children, robed in white, stood with him in the chariot, or rode the trace-horses. A slave stood behind the conqueror, holding a golden crown, and whispering in his ear a warning that all glory ... is fleeting.

== Cast ==
- George C. Scott as General George S. Patton
- Karl Malden as General Omar N. Bradley
- David Bauer as Lieutenant General Harry Buford
- Edward Binns as Lieutenant General Walter Bedell Smith
- John Doucette as Major General Lucian Truscott
- Michael Strong as Brigadier General Hobart Carver, based on Hobart Gay
- Peter Barkworth as Colonel John Welkin
- Lawrence Dobkin as Colonel Gaston Bell
- Paul Stevens as Colonel Charles R. Codman
- Morgan Paull as Captain Richard N. Jenson
- Stephen Young as Captain Chester B. Hansen
- James Edwards as Sergeant William George Meeks
- Tim Considine as a shell-shocked soldier
- Michael Bates as Field Marshal Bernard Montgomery
- Jack Gwillim as Field Marshal Sir Harold Alexander
- Gerald Flood as Air Chief Marshal Sir Arthur Tedder
- John Barrie as Air Vice-Marshal Sir Arthur Coningham
- Frank Latimore as Lieutenant Colonel Henry Davenport
- Karl Michael Vogler as Field Marshal Erwin Rommel
- Richard Münch as Colonel General Alfred Jodl
- Siegfried Rauch as Captain Oskar Steiger

== Production ==
Lee Marvin, Burt Lancaster, John Wayne, Robert Mitchum and Rod Steiger declined the role of Patton. Steiger later said it was his greatest mistake. Charlton Heston was considered for the role of Omar Bradley before Karl Malden was cast.

=== Development ===
Attempts to make a film about the life of Patton had been made since he died in 1945, but his widow, Beatrice, resisted. After her death in 1953, producer Frank McCarthy began the project and, the day after Beatrice was buried, the producers contacted the family for help in making the film, requesting access to Patton's diaries as well as input from family members, but the family declined to help. McCarthy also sought co-operation from The Pentagon; it also initially refused, as Patton's son, George Patton IV, was in the Army, and Patton's second daughter, Ruth, was married to an officer. By 1959, McCarthy had convinced the Army to co-operate.

20th Century-Fox bought A Soldier's Story, the 1951 autobiography of General of the Army Omar Bradley (who features prominently in the film, played by Karl Malden). Francis Ford Coppola wrote the film script in 1963, based largely on Ladislas Farago's 1963 biography Patton: Ordeal and Triumph, and on A Soldier's Story. Edmund H. North was later brought in to help work on the script. The film was originally to be titled Blood & Guts, and William Wyler was originally scheduled to direct. Wyler quit before the planned starting date of January 1969.

Bradley, the only surviving five-star general officer in the United States after the death of Dwight D. Eisenhower in 1969, served as a consultant for the film, although the extent of his influence and input into the final script is largely unknown. While Bradley knew Patton, it was also well known that the two men were opposites in personality, and there is evidence that Bradley despised Patton. As the film was made without Patton's diaries, it largely relied upon observations by Bradley and attempts by other military contemporaries to reconstruct Patton's thoughts and motives. In a review of the film, Brigadier General S.L.A. Marshall, who knew both Patton and Bradley, stated, "The Bradley name gets heavy billing on a picture of [a] comrade that, while not caricature, is the likeness of a victorious, glory-seeking buffoon.... Patton in the flesh was an enigma. He so stays in the film.... Napoleon once said that the art of the general is not strategy but knowing how to mold human nature.... Maybe that is all producer Frank McCarthy and Gen. Bradley, his chief advisor, are trying to say."

=== Filming ===
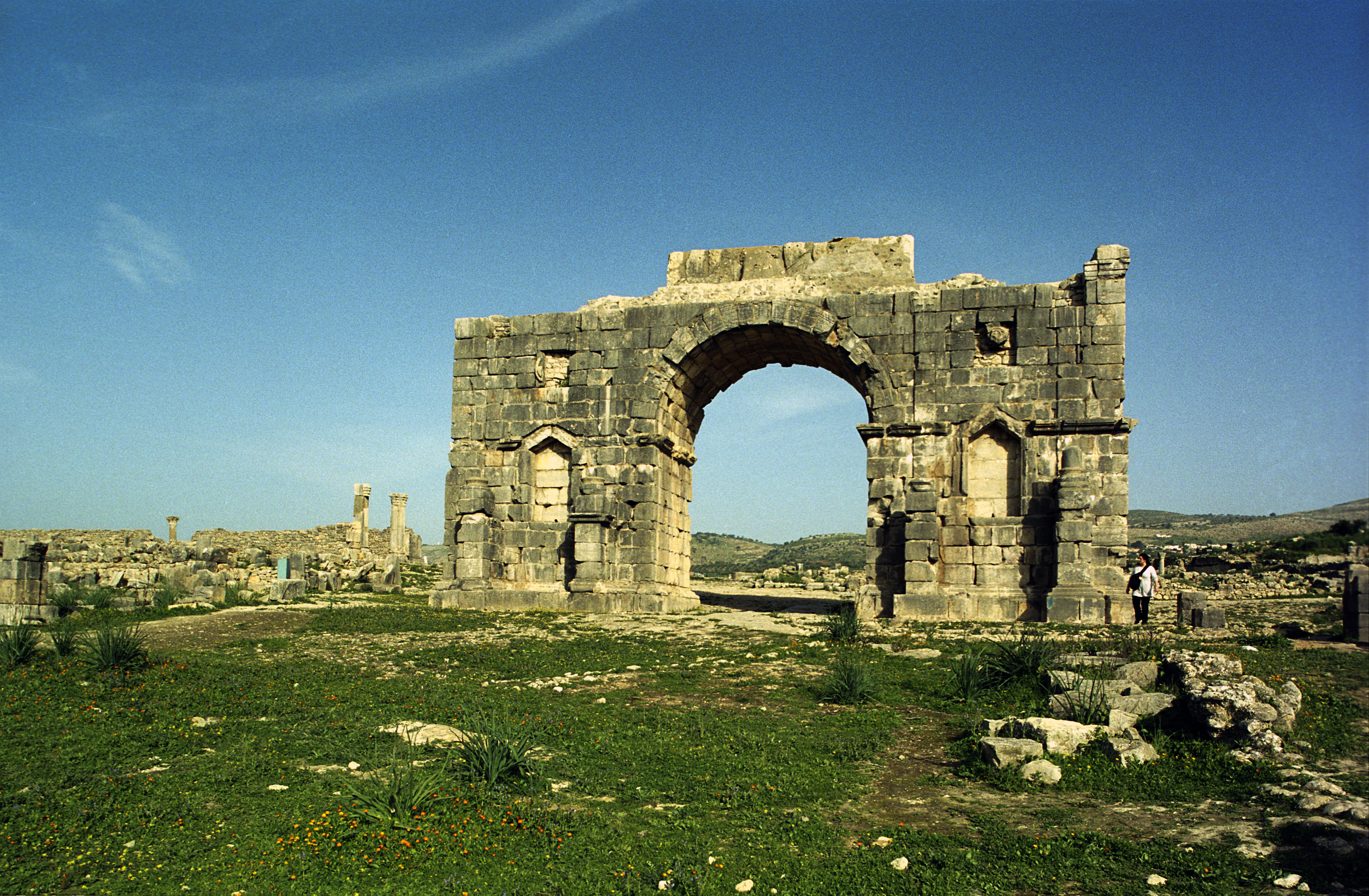
The Triumphal Arch of Volubilis in Morocco

The film started shooting February 3, 1969, and was shot at seventy-one locations in six countries, mostly in Spain, which had a great deal of U.S. Army World War II surplus equipment. Francoist Spain had sustained a currency control for decades, and filming in the country was the only way to indirectly recover the profits of the box office from American films. Cheap labor also encouraged runaway productions.

One scene, which depicts Patton driving up to an ancient city that is implied to be Carthage, was shot in the ancient Roman Mauretanian city of Volubilis, Morocco. The early scene, where Patton and Muhammed V are reviewing Moroccan troops including the Goumiers, was shot at the Royal Palace in Rabat. One unannounced battle scene was shot the night before, which raised fears in the Royal Palace neighborhood of a coup d'état. One paratrooper was electrocuted in power lines, but none of this battle footage appears in the film. The scene at the dedication of the welcome centre in Knutsford, Cheshire, England, was filmed at the actual site. The scenes set in Tunisia and Sicily were shot in Almeria in the south of Spain; Pamplona in the north was used for France and Germany; while the winter scenes in Belgium, including for the Battle of the Bulge sequence, were shot near Segovia (to which the production crew rushed when they were informed that snow had fallen). Interior shots were filmed in Seville.

The film was shot by cinematographer Fred J. Koenekamp in 65 mm Dimension 150, making it the second film to be shot in that format, after The Bible: In the Beginning... (1966).

A sizeable amount of battle scene footage was left out of the final cut of Patton, but a use was soon found for it. Outtakes from Patton were used to provide battle scenes in the 1972 made-for-TV film Fireball Forward, which was produced by Patton producer Frank McCarthy and written by Edmund North. One of the cast members of Patton, Morgan Paull, appeared in this production.

=== Opening ===
The film's opening scene

The film opens with Scott's rendering of Patton's speech to the Third Army, set against a huge American flag. Coppola and North had to tone down Patton's actual words and statements in the scene, as well as throughout the rest of the film, to avoid an R rating from the Motion Picture Association of America; in the opening monologue, the word "fornicating" replaced "fucking" when he was criticizing The Saturday Evening Post. Also, Scott's gravelly bass-baritone voice is the opposite of Patton's high-pitched, nasal and somewhat squeaky tenor, a point noted by historian S.L.A. Marshall. However, Marshall also points out that the film contains "too much cursing and obscenity [by Patton]. Patton was not habitually foul-mouthed. He used dirty words when he thought they were needed to impress."

When Scott learned that the speech would open the film, he refused to do it, as he believed that it would overshadow the rest of his performance. Schaffner assured him that it would be shown at the end. The scene was shot in one afternoon at Sevilla Studios in Madrid, with the flag having been painted on the back of the stage wall.

All the medals and decorations shown on Patton's uniform in the monologue are replicas of those actually awarded to Patton. However, the general never wore all of them in public, and was, in any case, not a four-star general when he made the famous speeches on which the opening is based. He wore them all on only one occasion, in his backyard in Virginia at the request of his wife, who wanted a picture of him with all his medals. The producers used a copy of this photo to help recreate this "look" for the opening scene.

=== Music ===
The critically acclaimed score was composed and conducted by Jerry Goldsmith and performed by the Hollywood Studio Symphony. Goldsmith used a number of innovative methods to tie the music to the film, such as having an echoplex loop recorded sounds of "call to war" triplets played on the trumpet to musically represent General Patton's belief in reincarnation. The main theme also consisted of a symphonic march accompanied by a pipe organ to represent the militaristic yet deeply religious nature of the protagonist. The music to Patton subsequently earned Goldsmith an Oscar nomination for Best Original Score, and was one of the American Film Institute's 250 nominees for the top 25 American film scores. The original soundtrack has been released three times on disc and once on LP: through 20th-Century Fox Records in 1970, Tsunami Records in 1992, Film Score Monthly in 1999, and a two-disc extended version through Intrada Records in 2010.

==== 2010 Intrada Records album ====
===== Disc One =====
Original Motion Picture Soundtrack
No.	Title	Length
1.	"Patton Salute (Solo Bugle)"	0:44
2.	"Main Title"	3:08
3.	"The Battleground"	2:14
4.	"The Cemetery"	2:42
5.	"The First Battle"	2:50
6.	"The Funeral"	1:54
7.	"The Hospital"	3:36
8.	"The Prayer"	1:11
9.	"No Assignment"	2:23
10.	"Patton March"	1:53
11.	"Attack"	3:15
12.	"German Advance"	2:32
13.	"An Eloquent Man"	1:43
14.	"The Payoff"	2:26
15.	"A Change Of Weather"	1:23
16.	"Pensive Patton"	0:16
17.	"End Title"	2:20
18.	"Echoplex Session (bonus)"	5:29
Total length:		41:11

===== Disc Two =====
Original 1970 Score Album
No.	Title	Length
1.	"Patton Speech (spoken by George C. Scott)"	4:54
2.	"Main Title"	2:17
3.	"The Battleground"	2:19
4.	"The First Battle"	2:48
5.	"Attack"	3:14
6.	"The Funeral"	1:53
7.	"Winter March"	1:55
8.	"Patton March"	2:04
9.	"No Assignment"	1:59
10.	"German Advance"	2:31
11.	"The Hospital"	3:18
12.	"The Payoff"	2:22
13.	"End Title & Speech (spoken by George C. Scott)"	1:01
14.	"End Title (sans dialogue) (bonus)"	1:11
Total length:		33:46

== Release ==
The film had its premiere on February 4, 1970, at the Criterion Theatre in New York before its roadshow release starting the following day.

=== First telecast ===
Patton was first telecast by ABC as a three hour-plus color film special on November 19, 1972, only two years after its theatrical release. This was highly unusual at the time, especially for a roadshow release which had played in theatres for many months. Most theatrical films at that time had to wait at least five years for their first telecast. Another unusual element of the telecast was that almost none of Patton's profanity-laced dialogue was cut (only two sentences, one of which contained no profanity, were cut from the famous opening speech in front of the giant US flag). The film was the fourth highest-rated film broadcast on television in the United States at the time, with a Nielsen rating of 38.5 and an audience share of 65%.

=== Home media ===
In 1977, Patton was among the first 50 VHS and Betamax releases from Magnetic Video. The film would be released on LaserDisc in 1981, also by Magnetic Video. A widescreen version was released in 1989, which includes four newsreels about the real Patton. A THX-certified LaserDisc was released on July 9, 1997, trading the newsreels for many new features. A THX-certified widescreen VHS was also released in 1998 by the same distributor, 20th Century Fox Home Entertainment.

Patton was first released on DVD in 1999, featuring an audio commentary by Charles M. Province, founder of The George S. Patton Jr. Historical Society, and again in 2006, with a commentary by screenwriter Francis Ford Coppola and extra bonus features.

The film made its Region A (locked) Blu-ray debut in 2008 to much criticism for its excessive use of digital noise reduction on the picture quality. In 2012, a remaster was released with much improved picture quality. In June 2013, Fox UK released the film on Region B Blu-ray but reverted to the 2008 transfer.

== Reception ==
=== Box office ===
The film grossed an estimated $51,000 in its first week. According to Fox records, the film required $22,525,000 in theatrical rentals to break even, and had made $27,650,000 by December 11, 1970, making a profit to the studio. Eventually, it returned worldwide rentals of $45 million, including $28.1 million from the United States and Canada from a gross of $61.7 million.

=== Critical response ===
Roger Ebert said of George C. Scott's portrayal of Patton, "It is one of those sublime performances in which the personalities of the actor and the character are fulfilled in one another." Gene Siskel gave the film three stars out of four and wrote that Scott "has created an acting tour de force," but found it "repetitive – the second half doesn't tell us anything more than the first." Vincent Canby of The New York Times wrote, "The most refreshing thing about 'Patton' is that here—I think for the first time—the subject matter and the style of the epic war movie are perfectly matched ... Although the cast is large, the only performance of note is that of Scott, who is continuously entertaining and, occasionally, very appealing."

Charles Champlin of the Los Angeles Times wrote, "'Patton' has, like Lawrence of Arabia, done the near-impossible by creating a finely detailed portrait despite all the tuggings toward simplification which are inevitable in the big budget, long, loud roadshow production desperate to attract mass audiences. As Patton, George Scott gives one of the great and unforgettable screen characterizations." Gary Arnold of The Washington Post wrote that the film "eventually shares the dramatic limitations, as well as the visual triumphs, of Lawrence of Arabia: yet another fascinating but inconclusive portrait of a mercurial military leader. The camera focus is sharp, but the dramatic focus is blurred. We never quite understand Patton in historical context, in relation to the other generals of the period, and to the entire Allied war effort."

Pauline Kael of The New Yorker wrote that "technically the movie is awesomely impressive," but went on to state that "I'm sure it will be said that the picture is 'true' to Patton and to history, but I think it strings us along and holds out on us. If we don't just want to have our prejudices greased, we'll find it confusing and unsatisfying, because we aren't given enough information to evaluate Patton's actions." John Gillett of The Monthly Film Bulletin wrote, "While communicating a relish for the man with all his warts, [Schaffner] also pinpoints the monstrous prejudices which lay beneath the surface. And, of course, he chose the right actor. Karl Malden's Bradley is neatly observed and the German players are good, but Scott's performance rightly dwarfs all the rest." Online film critic James Berardinelli has called Patton his favorite film of all time and "to this day one of Hollywood's most compelling biographical war pictures."

According to Bob Woodward and Carl Bernstein's book The Final Days, it was Richard Nixon's favorite film. Nixon first viewed Patton with his family at a private screening in the White House Family Theater on April 5, 1970. Nixon became obsessed with the film, repeatedly watching it with Henry Kissinger over the next month. He screened it several times at the White House and during a cruise on the presidential yacht USS Sequoia in the Potomac River. Kissinger sarcastically wrote of Nixon's insistence that he see the film on the cruise: "It was the second time he had so honored me. Inspiring as the film no doubt was, I managed to escape for an hour in the middle of it to prepare for the next day's NSC meeting."

On review aggregation website Rotten Tomatoes, Patton has a 90% approval rating based on 52 reviews, with an average score of 8.4/10. Its critical consensus reads, "George C. Scott's sympathetic, unflinching portrayal of the titular general in this sprawling epic is as definitive as any performance in the history of American biopics." On Metacritic, it has a score of 86% based on reviews from 20 critics, indicating "universal acclaim".

=== Accolades ===
The film was nominated for 10 Academy Awards at the 1971 ceremony, winning seven awards including Best Picture. George C. Scott also won the Academy Award for Best Actor for his performance, but he declined it, citing a dislike of the voting process and the concept of acting competitions. He was the first actor to do so. The film's producer, Frank McCarthy, accepted the award on Scott's behalf.

The Best Picture statuette is on display at the George C. Marshall Museum at the Virginia Military Institute, courtesy of Frank McCarthy.

Award	Category	Nominee(s)	Result	Ref.
Academy Awards	Best Picture	Frank McCarthy	Won	
Academy Awards	Best Director	Franklin J. Schaffner	Won	
Academy Awards	Best Actor	George C. Scott (Note: Declined award.)	Won	
Academy Awards	Best Story and Screenplay – Based on Factual Material or Material Not Previously Published or Produced	Francis Ford Coppola and Edmund H. North	Won	
Academy Awards	Best Art Direction	Art Direction: Urie McCleary and Gil Parrondo; Set Decoration: Antonio Mateos and Pierre-Louis Thévenet	Won	
Academy Awards	Best Cinematography	Fred J. Koenekamp	Nominated	
Academy Awards	Best Film Editing	Hugh S. Fowler	Won	
Academy Awards	Best Original Score	Jerry Goldsmith	Nominated	
Academy Awards	Best Sound	Douglas Williams and Don Bassman	Won	
Academy Awards	Best Special Visual Effects	Alex Weldon	Nominated	
American Cinema Editors Awards	Best Edited Feature Film	Hugh S. Fowler	Won	
British Academy Film Awards	Best Actor in a Leading Role	George C. Scott	Nominated	
British Academy Film Awards	Best Soundtrack	Don Hall, Douglas O. Williams, and Don J. Bassman	Nominated	
Directors Guild of America Awards	Outstanding Directorial Achievement in Motion Pictures	Franklin J. Schaffner	Won	
Golden Globe Awards	Best Motion Picture – Drama		Nominated	
Golden Globe Awards	Best Actor in a Motion Picture – Drama	George C. Scott	Won	
Golden Globe Awards	Best Director – Motion Picture	Franklin J. Schaffner	Nominated	
Golden Reel Awards	Best Sound Editing – Feature Film		Won	
Kansas City Film Critics Circle Awards	Best Film		Won (Note: Tied with Five Easy Pieces.)	
Kansas City Film Critics Circle Awards	Best Actor	George C. Scott	Won	
Laurel Awards	Best Picture		Won	
Laurel Awards	Top Male Dramatic Performance	George C. Scott	Won	
Laurel Awards	Top Male Supporting Performance	Karl Malden	Nominated	
Laurel Awards	Top Cinematographer	Fred J. Koenekamp	Won	
Laurel Awards	Top Composer	Jerry Goldsmith	Won	
National Board of Review Awards	Top Ten Films		Won	
National Board of Review Awards	Best Film		Won	
National Board of Review Awards	Best Actor	George C. Scott	Won	
National Film Preservation Board	National Film Registry		Inducted	
New York Film Critics Circle Awards	Best Actor	George C. Scott	Won	
Online Film & Television Association Awards	Film Hall of Fame: Productions		Inducted	
Writers Guild of America Awards	Best Drama – Written Directly for the Screen	Francis Ford Coppola and Edmund H. North	Won	

- In 2006, the Writers Guild of America West ranked Francis Ford Coppola and Edmund H. North's adapted screenplay as the 94th among 101 greatest screenplays of all time.

American Film Institute Lists

- AFI's 100 Years...100 Movies – #89
- AFI's 100 Years...100 Heroes and Villains:
  - George S. Patton – #29 Hero

== Sequel ==
A made-for-television sequel, The Last Days of Patton, was produced in 1986. Scott reprised his title role. The film was based on Patton's final weeks after being mortally injured in a car accident, with flashbacks of Patton's life.

== See also ==
- List of American films of 1970
- 1970s in film

== Bibliography ==
- Suid, Lawrence H. (2002). Guts & Glory: The Making of the American Military Image in Film. University Press of Kentucky. pp. 260–278. ISBN 9780813190181. Suid's book contains an extended discussion of the production of Patton and of public and critical response to the film, the discussion occupies most of the chapter, "13. John Wayne, The Green Berets, and Other Heroes."
