= Robert Nathan =

American novelist

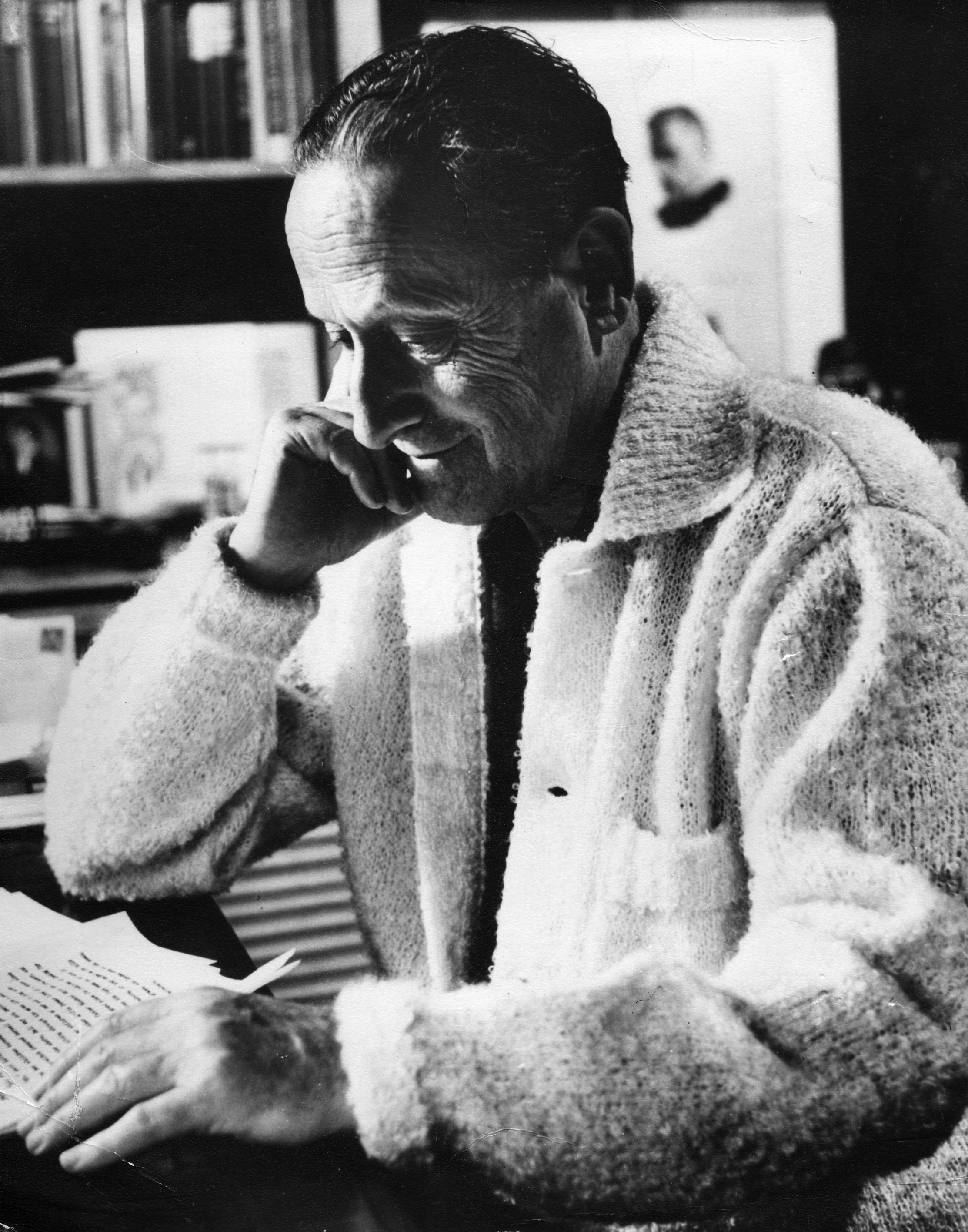
- Born: January 2, 1894; New York City, U.S.
- Died: May 25, 1985 (aged 91); Los Angeles, California, U.S.
- Occupations: Novelist, poet
- Spouse: Anna Lee (7th)
- Relatives: Maud Nathan (aunt); Annie Nathan Meyer (aunt); Emma Lazarus (cousin); Benjamin Cardozo (cousin)
- Writing career
- Notable works: The Bishop's Wife; Portrait of Jennie
- Website: www.robertnathanlibrary.com

Robert Gruntal Nathan (January 2, 1894 – May 25, 1985) was an American novelist and poet.

== Biography ==
Nathan was born into a prominent New York Sephardic Jewish family. He was educated privately in Switzerland and attended Phillips Exeter Academy, then entered Harvard University in 1912. It was there that his short fiction and poetry was first published, in the prestigious literary magazine The Harvard Monthly, where he also became an editor. However, he never graduated, choosing instead to drop out and take a job at an advertising firm to support his family (he married while a junior at Harvard). It was while working in 1919 that he wrote his first novel—the semi-autobiographical work Peter Kindred—which was a critical failure. But his luck soon changed during the 1920s, when he wrote seven more novels, including The Bishop's Wife, which was later made into a successful film under the same title starring Cary Grant, David Niven, and Loretta Young in 1947.

During the 1930s, his success continued with more works, including fictional pieces and poetry. His 1933 novel One More Spring was filmed in 1935. In 1940, he wrote his most successful book, Portrait of Jennie, about a Depression-era artist and the woman he is painting, who is slipping through time. Portrait of Jennie is considered a modern masterpiece of fantasy fiction and was made into a film, starring Jennifer Jones and Joseph Cotten.

In 1942 Nathan wrote a poem "Dunkirk: A Ballad", then became a screenwriter for MGM, where he added additional poetry to update Alice Duer Miller's poem for the film The White Cliffs of Dover (1944). He then wrote the screenplay of The Clock (1945), in which he had a cameo role. His screenplay for 3 Godfathers (1948) was rejected, but he made contributions to the screenplay of Pagan Love Song (1950).

In January 1956 the author wrote, as well as narrated, an episode of the CBS Radio Workshop, called "A Pride of Carrots, or Venus Well-Served".

Nathan's seventh wife was the British actress Anna Lee, to whom he was married from 1970 until his death. He came from a talented family—the activist Maud Nathan and author Annie Nathan Meyer were his aunts, and the poet Emma Lazarus and Supreme Court Justice Benjamin Cardozo his cousins.

== Works ==
=== Novels ===
- Peter Kindred, 1919
- Autumn, 1921
- The Puppet Master, 1923
- Jonah, 1925
- The Fiddler in Barly, 1926
- The Woodcutter's House, 1927
- The Bishop's Wife, 1928 (filmed in 1947)
- There Is Another Heaven, 1929
- The Orchid, 1931
- One More Spring, 1933 (filmed in 1935)
- Road of Ages, 1935
- The Enchanted Voyage, 1936 (filmed in 1946)
- Winter in April, 1938
- Portrait of Jennie, 1940 (filmed in 1948)
- They Went On Together, 1941
- The Sea-Gull Cry, 1942
- But Gently Day, 1943
- Mr. Whittle and the Morning Star, 1947
- Long After Summer, 1948 (televised on The Alcoa Hour in 1956)
- The River Journey, 1949
- The Married Look, 1950
- The Innocent Eve, 1951
- The Train in the Meadow, 1953
- Sir Henry, 1955
- The Rancho of the Little Loves, 1956
- So Love Returns, 1958
- The Color of the Evening, 1960
- The Weans, 1960,
- The Wilderness-Stone, 1961
- A Star in the Wind, 1962
- The Devil with Love, 1963
- The Fair, 1964
- The Mallott Diaries, 1965
- Stonecliff, 1967
- Mia, 1970
- The Elixir, 1971
- The Summer Meadows, 1973
- Heaven and Hell and the Megas Factor, 1975

=== Novel collections ===
- The Barly Fields, 1938 (collection containing The Fiddler in Barly, The Woodcutter's House, The Bishop's Wife, The Orchid, and There Is Another Heaven). Introduction by Stephen Vincent Benét.
- The Bishop's Wife and Two Other Novels, 1946 Armed Services Edition, published by the Council on Books in Wartime (shortened version of The Barly Fields, containing The Bishop's Wife, The Orchid, There Is Another Heaven, and Benét's introduction)

=== Plays ===
- Jezebel’s Husband & The Sleeping Beauty, 1953 (collection of two plays)
- Juliet in Mantua, 1966

=== Children's books ===
- Journey of Tapiola, 1938
- Tapiola's Brave Regiment, 1941
- The Adventures of Tapiola, 1950 (collection containing Journey of Tapiola and Tapiola's Brave Regiment)
- The Snowflake and the Starfish, 1959
- Tappy, 1968

=== Screenplays ===
- The White Cliffs of Dover, 1944 (additional poetry)
- The Clock, 1945
- Pagan Love Song, 1950

=== Nonfiction ===
- The Concert, 1940
- Journal for Josephine, 1943

=== Poetry ===
- Youth Grows Old, 1922
- A Cedar Box, 1929
- Selected Poems, 1935
- A Winter Tide: Sonnets and Poems, 1940
- Dunkirk: A Ballad, 1942
- Morning in Iowa, 1944
- The Darkening Meadows, 1945
- The Green Leaf, 1950
- The Married Man, 1962
- Evening Song: Selected Poems 1950–1973, 1973

=== Radio programs ===
- CBS Radio Workshop, "A Pride of Carrots or Venus Well-Served," 1956
- CBS Radio Workshop, "Report on the We'Uns," 1956

=== Television programs ===
- The Mark Twain Television Theatre, 1953.

=== Miscellaneous ===
- Two Robert Nathan Pieces, 1950 (book containing an interview with Mr. Nathan by Harvey Breit and the poem "Advice to My Son")
- "Robert Nathan Reading His Poems with Comment at His Home in Los Angeles, Calif., in April 1962", 1962 (tape reel sound recording)
