= Black Souls (play) =

Play by Annie Nathan Meyer

Black Souls is a play in six scenes by Annie Nathan Meyer. The play depicts the lynching of an innocent black man on a college campus and concerns themes of miscegenation and bigotry in the Southern United States in the post World War I era. The work is one of the first "lynching dramas" written by a white woman, and for this reason the play has remained of interest to theatre scholars. Written in 1924 and first performed in 1932 on Broadway, Meyer was assisted in crafting her play through input from black writers Zora Neale Hurston and James Weldon Johnson.

== History ==
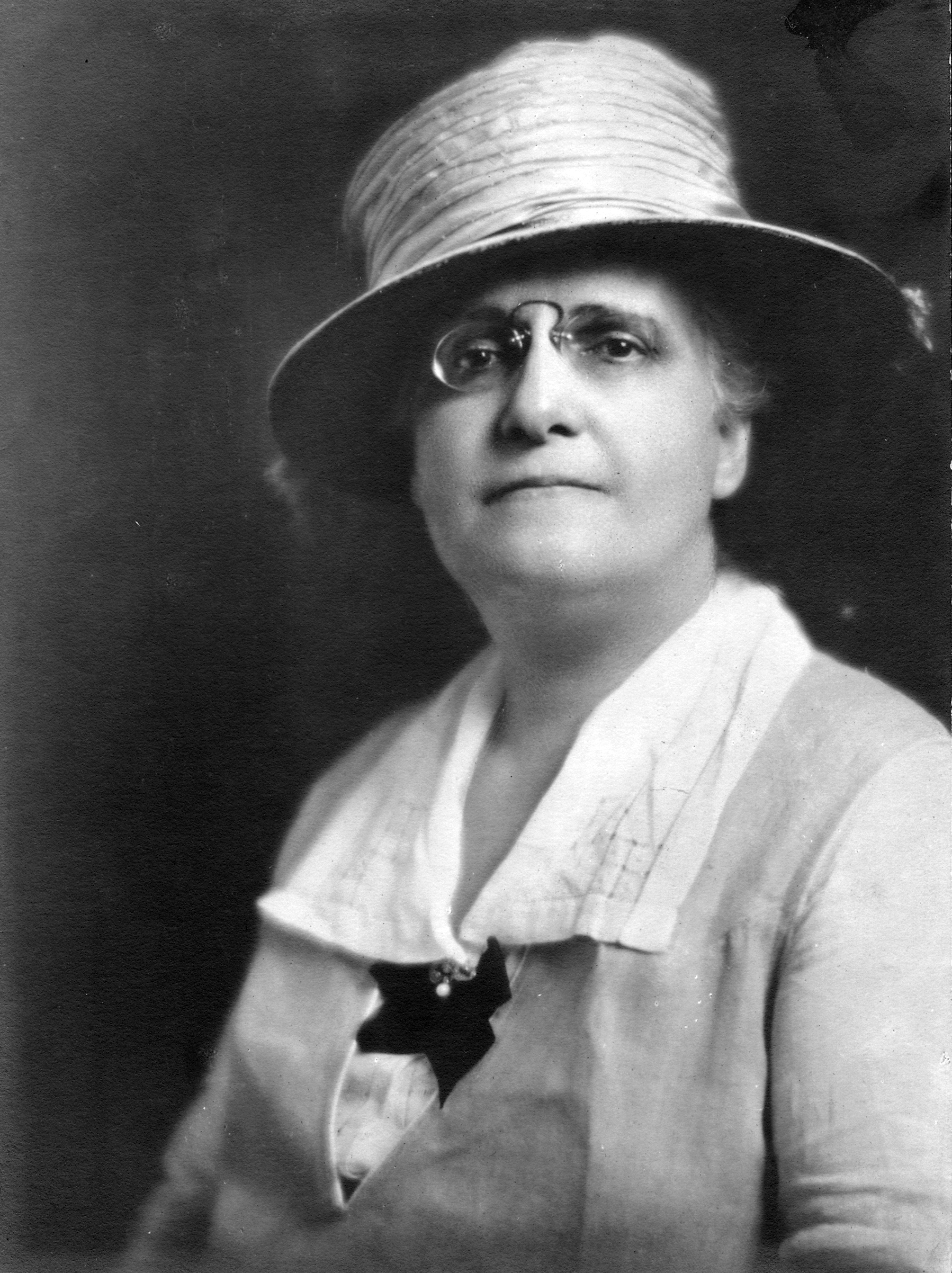
Annie Nathan Meyer

Black Souls was written by the Jewish-American playwright Annie Nathan Meyer in 1924, and is credited as "one of the earliest known 'lynching dramas' written by a white woman". In keeping with Meyer's activism against racism in America, the play deals with themes of "miscegenation and bigotry in the Deep South". The play's plot is centered around the lynching of an innocent black man at a fictional college somewhere in the southern part of the United States. In crafting her play, Meyer sought the assistance of black writer Zora Neale Hurston. Hurston assisted Meyer by selecting poetry, prayers, and spirituals that speak to the black experience in America which Meyer then embed within her work. She also received help from the African-American writer and civil rights activist James Weldon Johnson who edited the play's dialogue for the authenticity of the language.

Meyer attempted for several years to get her play staged without success; largely due to the reticence of directors to take on a play with a subject matter difficult to make palatable to the public. Ultimately she succeeded in attracting the director James Light, and his staging of Black Souls premiered on Broadway at the Provincetown Playhouse on March 30, 1932. The actress Rose McClendon drew particular praise for her portrayal of Phyllis in the production. Others in the cast included Morris McKenney as Andrew Morgan, Juano Hernandez as David Lewis, Guerita Donneley as Luella Verne, and Alven Dexter as Senator Verne. The original production used sets designed by Morgens Petri.

The Broadway production of Black Souls was largely praised for the quality of its acting, but white critics in particular were not complementary of the play itself. However, the work has remained of interest to scholars and was more favorably reviewed by black critics. The play was first published by Reynolds Press in 1933, and was later re-published by the Indiana University Press in the 1998 anthology Strange Fruit: Plays on Lynching by American Women.

== Plot ==
Setting: Magnolia College, a Black college in the Deep South, not long after World War I (c. 1919/1920)

Andrew Morgan, the president of Magnolia College, is bitter over the racial oppression in the United States, but is hopeful that by educating highly skilled black workers he can improve the lives and future opportunities available to his African-American students through peaceful means. In contrast, Andrew's brother-in-law, David Lewis, is an angry young black poet and teacher of literature at Magnolia College who is convinced that only a violent uprising could persuade American society to change. David has recently returned from France where he served during World War I and where the progressive freedoms of French society allowed him to openly have a relationship with a white woman, Luella Verne, who was a fellow American serving in France as a nurse.

Luella is the daughter of Senator Verne, and she visits Magnolia College with her father when he comes at the invitation of President Morgan who hopes to win Senator Verne's support. Senator Verne is unaware of Luella's past relationship with David, and is upset when she initiates contact with David. Simultaneously, Senator Verne makes advances of his own on Andrew Morgan's wife and David's sister Phyllis who is also African-American, demonstrating the senator's hypocrisy when it comes to interracial relationships.

Luella convinces David to go with her to a cabin in some woods nearby and they are spotted by some white students. Rumor spreads among the white community that David has made unwanted sexual advances on Luella, even though it is Luella and not David who is the initiator of their rekindled relationship. As the rumors spread, they become more exaggerated and David is falsely accused of raping Luella. A white mob forms with the intent of murdering David on the day of Magnolia College's graduation ceremony. While the ceremony is taking place and President Morgan is giving a speech about racial equality, David is isolated and cornered by a white mob who lynches him.
