= Maud Nathan =

American labor activist, social worker and suffragist (1862–1946)

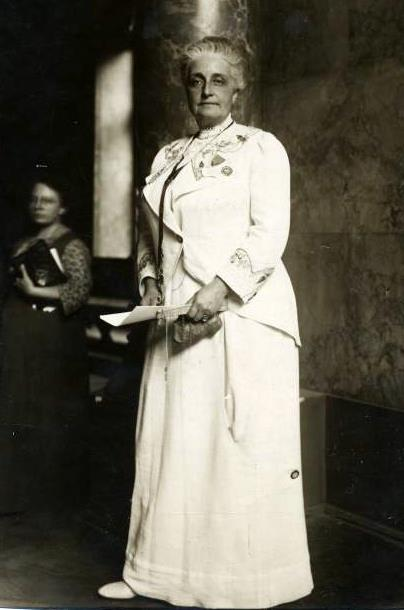
- Maud Nathan at the 1913 International Woman's Suffrage Conference, Budapest
- Born: October 20, 1862
- Died: December 15, 1946 (aged 84)
- Spouse: Fredrick Nathan (m. 1880)

Maud Nathan (October 20, 1862 – December 15, 1946) was an American social worker, labor activist and women's suffragist.

== Early life ==
She was born on October 20, 1862, to a New York City Sephardic Jewish family of Portuguese origin. Her mother was Annie Augusta Nathan (née Florance) and her father was Robert Weeks Nathan. She came from a prominent New York City family, descended from Gershom Mendes Seixas, minister of New York's Congregation Sherith Israel during the American Revolutionary War. Nathan was a member of the Daughters of the American Revolution.

Her sister was the author and education activist Annie Nathan Meyer, the founder of Barnard College. Her cousins are the poet Emma Lazarus, Supreme Court Justice Benjamin Cardozo, and her husband Frederick Nathan. Her nephew was the author and poet Robert Nathan. She and her family moved to Green Bay, Wisconsin, for four years. Maud finished her high school education there. The family moved back to New York City after the death of Maud's mother in 1878.

On April 7, 1880, seventeen-year-old Maud Nathan married her first cousin Frederick Nathan.

== Career ==
As a young married woman, Nathan became involved in charity work. She was named director at both the Mount Sinai Hospital and the Hebrew Free School. Along with Josephine Shaw Lowell, Nathan was a founding member of the New York Consumer's League. The group supported an eight-hour workday for women and children and supported the Working Women's Society in publicizing shops which treated workers fairly.

The death of her daughter, Annette Florance Nathan, at the age of 8 in 1895 brought out a change in Nathan. Josephine Shaw Lowell, founder of the New York Consumers League suggested that Nathan work up an interest in the issues of working women in New York City, as a way to get over the loss of her child. This was the initial start of Nathan's career in helping women.

In 1897, Nathan became president of the New York Consumer's League. When the National Consumer's League was created in 1898, Nathan become a member of its executive committee. In 1901, the Consumer League of Rhode Island was organized after Maud Nathan gave a speech in the state.

Maud Nathan (1912)

Lobbying Albany on consumer issues made Nathan realize how little legislators cared about the opinions of vote-less women and so Nathan became more involved in suffrage activities. In 1908, Nathan published a pamphlet entitled The Wage Earner and the Ballot which pointed out that in suffrage states the age of consent was higher, the illiteracy rate was lower, women were paid more for civil service jobs, and there were stronger child labor laws.

== See also ==
- Progressivism
