= Fireball Forward =

1972 American made-for-TV movie

- Genre: Action; Drama; War
- Written by: Edmund H. North
- Directed by: Marvin J. Chomsky
- Starring: Ben Gazzara; Ricardo Montalbán; Dana Elcar; Edward Binns; Morgan Paull
- Country of origin: United States
- Original language: English

Production
- Producer: Frank McCarthy
- Cinematography: Robert L. Morrison
- Editors: Harry Coswick; Charles L. Freeman; Pembroke J. Herring
- Running time: 98 minutes
- Production company: 20th Century Fox Television

Original release
- Network: ABC
- Release: March 5, 1972

Fireball Forward is a 1972 American made-for-TV movie. It was directed by Marvin J. Chomsky and written by Edmund H. North. It was produced by Frank McCarthy who called it "son of Patton": it follows a hard luck Army division in 1944 France, and the General who must lick it into shape. The film was a pilot for a proposed TV series.

== Plot ==
After D-Day, Maj. General Joe Barret is decorated with the Distinguished Service Cross medal, but Gen. Omar Bradley transfers him to the 14th Division due to poor performance in battle.

Barret finds the 14th Division with a bad combat record, lack of morale and discipline. After two disastrous battles against the German army, Barret discovers that he has a mole, who turns out to be the head of the French Resistance, Jean Duval. Barret had learned, through Sgt. Collins, that before each battle the enemy knew their strategy.

Once Barret discovered the spy, the 14th Division wins its next battle and begins a successful push all the way to Gen. Patton, near Berlin. However, all U.S. Forces are ordered to hold on the west side of the Elbe river, with everything east of the Elbe left for the Russians. Only after the surrender did the Western Allied forces enter Berlin, per the Potsdam Agreement.

== Cast ==
- Ben Gazzara as Maj. Gen. Joe Barret
- Ricardo Montalbán as Jean Duval (as Ricardo Montalban)
- Anne Francis as Helen Sawyer
- Dana Elcar as Col. Talbot
- Edward Binns as Corps. Commander
- Morgan Paull as Sgt. Andrew Collins
- Curt Lowens as Capt. Bauer
- L.Q. Jones as Maj. Larkin
- Eddie Albert as Col. Douglas Graham
- Richard Yniguez as Capt. Tony Sánchez
