= Annie Nathan Meyer =

American novelist and activist (1867–1951)

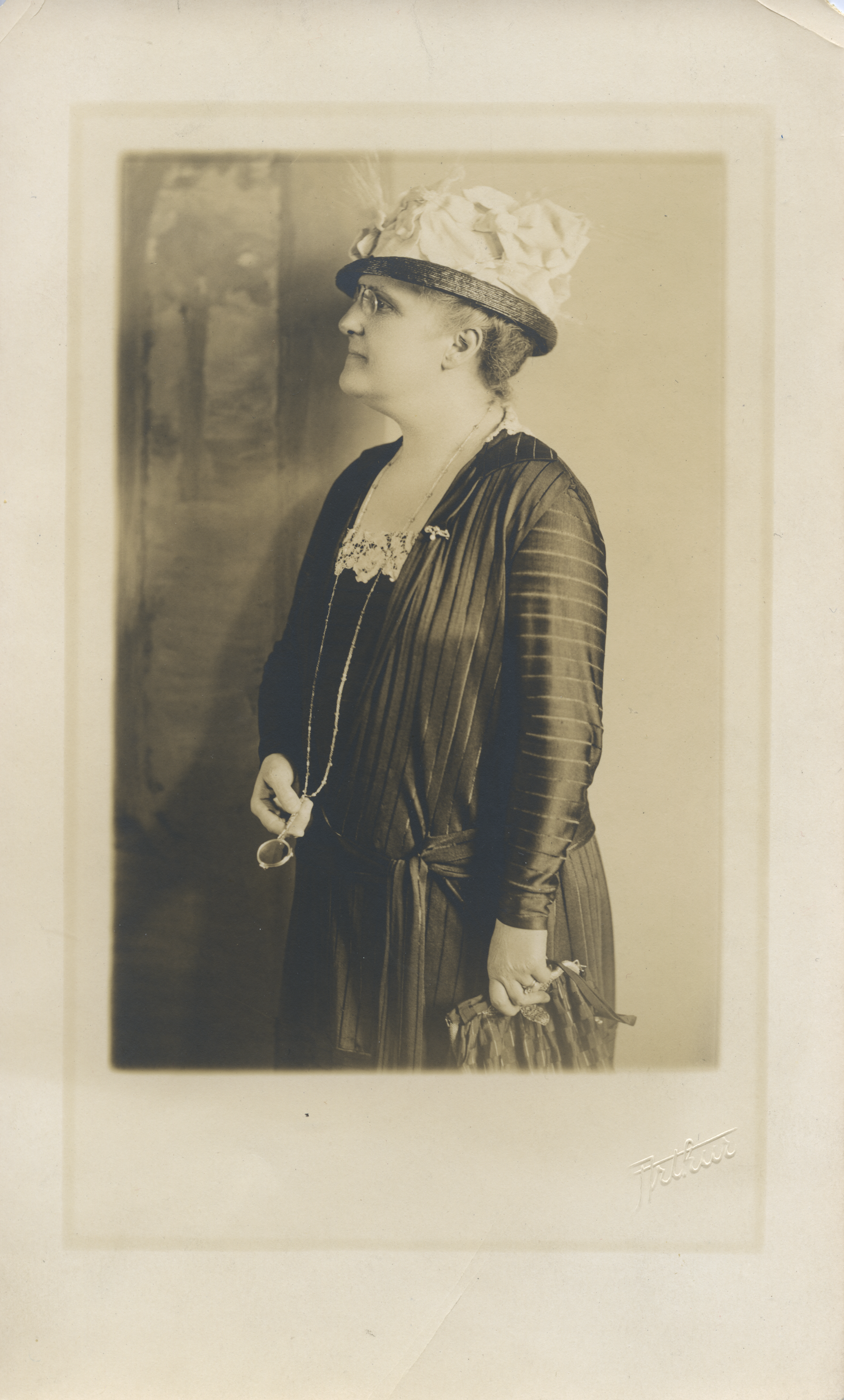
- Annie Nathan Meyer in 1920
- Born: Annie Nathan; February 19, 1867; New York City, U.S.
- Died: November 23, 1951 (aged 84)
- Known for: Founding Trustee of Barnard College
- Spouse: Alfred Meyer (m. 1887)
- Children: 1 (Margaret Cohen)
- Parents: Robert Weeks Nathan (father); Annie Augusta Florance (mother)

Annie Nathan Meyer (February 19, 1867 – September 23, 1951) was an American author, anti-suffragist, and promoter of higher education for women who founded Barnard College. Her sister was activist Maud Nathan and her nephew was author and poet Robert Nathan.

== Early years and education ==
She was born in New York City in 1867, the daughter of Annie Augusta Nathan (née Florance) and Robert Weeks Nathan. The Nathans are one of America's colonial-era Sephardic families living in Manhattan who had fled the religious restrictions in their native Spain and Portugal during the fifteenth century. Her great-grandfather was Gershom Seixas, the rabbi leading a prominent synagogue in colonial Manhattan who also suffered repression when he refused to follow the religious dictates of the British. Later, he would assist at the inauguration of George Washington.

During childhood, Meyer encountered many hardships as the Crash of 1873 damaged the financial status of her parents. Since she was withheld from public school by her mother's request, Meyer was self-educated and claimed to have read all of the works of Charles Dickens by the age of seven. In 1875, the family moved from New York to Green Bay, Wisconsin for greater employment opportunities.

Meyer later focused her studies carefully in order to enroll in the newly established Columbia College Collegiate Course for Women in 1885 at the all-male Columbia College in Manhattan. It was a program that allowed women to sit for examinations for all undergraduate degrees although they were not allowed to attend the lectures preparing its students for the examinations. The course did not recognize women participants as fully enrolled Columbia students because at the time, officially, the college did not enroll women.

A de facto Columbia graduate, she discontinued her participation there when on February 15, 1887, four days before turning twenty, she married her second cousin, Alfred Meyer, a prominent physician. Their courtship was cemented in a shared love of music, both being musicians. The Meyers only had one child, named Margaret. She was born in 1894 and died in 1923 of an accidental gunshot.

== Career ==
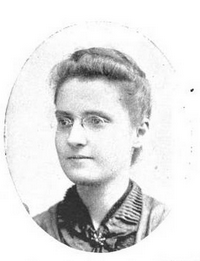
Annie Nathan Meyer (1894)

Within weeks of her wedding, Meyer began organizing a committee to fund a women's college at Columbia in an effort to provide young women with an educational opportunity that she had not enjoyed. In January 1888, Meyer wrote a 2,500-word essay to The Nation arguing New York City lacked culture in comparison to other major cities because it lacked a liberal arts college for women.

Meyer understood that the idea was futile without funding. Working with Ella Weed, she created a committee of fifty prominent New Yorkers willing to support the college she was founding. She then overcame the opposition of the Columbia University trustees by naming the college after Frederick Barnard, Columbia's then-recently deceased president who had been a strong advocate for coeducation.

The college opened in 1889, across the street from Columbia. Writing about Meyer during a discussion of anthropologists, Charles King, professor of international affairs at Georgetown University, notes that "[a]fter the First World War, instruction in the social sciences—psychology, government, applied statistics, and anthropology—was at least as good at Barnard as at the main university and often better. Virginia Gildersleeve, Barnard's visionary and long-serving dean, placed a premium on hiring the best professors from Columbia for additional lectures west of Broadway."

The college Meyer founded, Barnard College, is one of the Seven Sisters of women's colleges in America and ranks today as one of its most elite colleges. Although since its founding, women enrolled at Barnard have been able to attend the Columbia lectures on their level, only men were graduated from the undergraduate school of Columbia until 1983. Enrollment of women in Columbia graduate programs was dependent upon other guidelines and usually, having an undergraduate degree.

At one time, Annie Nathan Meyer was the associate editor of Broadway Magazine. She edited Woman's Work in America (1891) and contributed a series of articles to the New York Evening Post.

Meyer wrote several novels. Meyer's Robert Annys: A Poor Priest (1901) is set in medieval England and features John Ball as a character.

== View on women's suffrage movement ==
In direct conflict to her sister Maud Nathan, a suffragist, Meyer later became known as an opponent of suffrage for women. She considered improvement through the education of women as the first objective to be achieved to change the lives of women, rather than delving into politics. Meyer specifically contested suffragists' claims that politics would be purified by the addition of women's innate morality—a claim she referred to as "spreadhenism."

== Later life and death ==
She was widowed from her husband after a long marriage. He died no earlier than in his eighties.

At the end of her life she lived in New York's Hotel Croydon. She died on September 23, 1951, leaving no heirs, and left her estate to various charities. A large portion went to Montefiore Hospital, to establish a foundation in her husband's name; he had been a doctor there, specializing in tuberculosis.

== Selected works ==
- Women's Work in America (1891)
- Helen Brent, M. D. (1892)
- My Park Book (1898)
- Robert Annys: A Poor Priest (1901)
- The Dominant Sex (1911)
- The Dreamer; a Play in Three Acts (1912)
- Black Souls (1932)
- Barnard Beginnings (1935)
- It's Been Fun: An Autobiography (1951)
