= Portrait of Jennie =

1948 film by William Dieterle

- Movie poster
- Directed by: William Dieterle
- Screenplay by: Paul Osborn; Peter Berneis; Leonardo Bercovici (adaptation)
- Based on: Portrait of Jennie by Robert Nathan
- Produced by: David O. Selznick; David Hempstead
- Starring: Jennifer Jones; Joseph Cotten; Ethel Barrymore; Lillian Gish
- Narrated by: Joseph Cotten
- Cinematography: Joseph H. August
- Edited by: William Morgan
- Music by: Claude Debussy; Dimitri Tiomkin
- Production company: Vanguard Films
- Distributed by: Selznick Releasing Organization
- Release date: December 25, 1948
- Running time: 86 minutes
- Country: United States
- Language: English
- Budget: $4 million
- Box office: $1.5 million

Portrait of Jennie (also released under the title Tidal Wave) is a 1948 American supernatural film directed by William Dieterle, produced by David O. Selznick, and starring Jennifer Jones, Joseph Cotten, Ethel Barrymore, and Lillian Gish. Its plot follows an impoverished New York City painter whose chance encounter with an old-fashioned young woman in Central Park changes the course of his life. It is based on the 1940 novella of the same name by Robert Nathan.

At the 21st Academy Awards, it won an Oscar for Best Special Effects (Paul Eagler, Joseph McMillan Johnson, Russell Shearman and Clarence Slifer; Special Audible Effects: Charles L. Freeman and James G. Stewart). Joseph H. August was also nominated for the Academy Award for Best Cinematography (Black-and-White).

== Plot ==
In 1934, the impoverished painter Eben Adams meets a young girl named Jennie Appleton, dressed in old-fashioned clothing in Central Park, Manhattan. Moved by her beauty, Eben draws a sketch of her from memory. Miss Spinney, an art dealer, purchased one of his paintings before but tells Eben that his paintings lack feeling. However, Miss Spinney confesses to her partner that she sees potential in Eben's work.

Eben again encounters Jennie intermittently. Strangely, she appears to be growing up much more rapidly than is humanly possible. He soon falls deeply in love with her, but is puzzled by the fact that she seems to be experiencing events which occurred several decades earlier as if they had just happened. He follows clues in an old newspaper that Jennie gave him, and learns that her parents were trapeze performers who had died in a tragic stage accident.

After speaking to one of Jennie's teachers at the convent which took Jennie in after her parents' deaths, Eben discovers that Jennie habitually rowed out to Land's End Lighthouse alone and that she drowned ten years earlier, on October 5, when a hurricane struck while she was out sailing. Eben sells enough of his paintings to take a trip to the lighthouse, where he rents a boat and searches for Jennie despite clear signs of another approaching hurricane. They find each other on the island but are both swept into the sea by a strong wave. Eben attempts to save Jennie but she is carried away. Eben is rescued by some locals and wakes with Miss Spinney, who oversees his recovery, by his bedside. A title card notes that the Portrait of Jennie became the defining art piece of Eben's career, giving his work more feeling than all his previous works, which held "nothing distinguishing" until the creation of the portrait.

== Cast ==
- Jennifer Jones as Jennifer "Jennie" Appleton, the title character, who seems to possess a mysterious ability to travel through time.
- Joseph Cotten as Eben Adams, the main protagonist, who is initially intrigued by and then falls in love with the mysterious title character.
- Ethel Barrymore as Miss Spinney, Eben's friend, who has come to believe Eben's story about the mysterious Jennie, with whom he is besotted.
- Lillian Gish as Mother Mary of the St. Mercy Convent, where young Jennie had lived since her parents' deaths.
- Cecil Kellaway as Matthews
- David Wayne as Gus O'Toole
- Albert Sharpe as Moore
- Henry Hull as Eke
- Florence Bates as Mrs. Jekes
- Clem Bevans as Capt. Cobb
- Brian Keith as Ice-Skating Extra (uncredited)
- Anne Francis as Teenager in Art Gallery (uncredited)
- Nancy Olson as Teenager in Art Gallery (uncredited)
- Robert Dudley as Another Old Mariner (uncredited)
- Maude Simmons as Clara Morgan

== Production ==
=== Development ===
The book on which the film was based first attracted the attention of David O. Selznick, who purchased it as a vehicle for Jennifer Jones.

=== Filming ===
Filming began in early 1947 in New York City and Boston, Massachusetts, but Selznick was unhappy with the results and scheduled re-shoots as well as hiring and firing five different writers before the film was completed in October 1948. The budget for the production ultimately reached $4,041,000.

The New York shooting enabled Selznick to use Albert Sharpe and David Wayne, who were both appearing on stage in Finian's Rainbow, giving an Irish flair to characters and the painting in the bar that was not in Nathan's novel.

Although Portrait of Jennie was a fantasy, Selznick insisted on filming actual locations in Massachusetts (The Graves Light) and New York City (Central Park, The Cloisters and the Metropolitan Museum of Art), which dramatically increased the film's production costs. The film's major overhaul came when Selznick added a tinted color sequence for the final scenes. The final shot of the painting, appearing just before the credits, was presented in three-strip Technicolor.

Portrait of Jennie was highly unusual for its time in that it had no opening credits as such, except for the Selznick Studio logo. All the other credits appear at the end. Before the film proper begins, the title is announced by the narrator (after delivering a spoken prologue, he says, "And now, 'Portrait of Jennie'").

The portrait of Jennie (Jennifer Jones) was painted by artist Robert Brackman. The painting became one of Selznick's prized possessions, and it was displayed in his home after he married Jones in 1949.

The film features Joseph H. August's cinematography, capturing the lead character's obsession with Jennie amongst the environs of a wintry New York. August shot many of the scenes through a canvas, making the scenes look like actual paintings, using many lenses from the silent film era. He died shortly after completing the film, for which he was posthumously nominated for an Academy Award for Best Cinematography.

A scene of Jennie and Eben having a picnic after witnessing the ceremony in the convent features in the original screenplay. It was filmed but deleted when it looked as if Jennie's hair was blending into the tree next to her. Another scene that featured Jennie doing a dance choreographed by Jerome Robbins took over ten days to film, but was not used in the completed film.

== Music ==
The composer, Dimitri Tiomkin, used themes by Claude Debussy, including Prélude à l'après-midi d'un faune (Prelude to the Afternoon of a Faun), the two Arabesques, "Nuages" and "Sirènes" from Nocturnes, and La fille aux cheveux de lin, with the addition of Bernard Herrmann's "Jennie's Theme" to a song featured in Nathan's book ("Where I came from, nobody knows, and where I am going everyone goes"), utilizing the haunting sound of the theremin, previously heard in Alfred Hitchcock's Spellbound and Billy Wilder's The Lost Weekend. Herrmann was assigned the original composing duties for the film but left during its extended shooting schedule.

== Release ==
Portrait of Jennie premiered in Los Angeles on Christmas Day 1948. It later had its New York City opening on April 22, 1949. It was rereleased in 1950 under the name Tidal Wave.

=== Home media ===
Anchor Bay Entertainment released Portrait of Jennie on DVD on November 28, 2000. It was reissued in 2004 by MGM Home Entertainment. In October 2017, Kino Lorber released the film on Blu-ray and DVD.

== Reception ==
=== Box office ===
The film earned $1,510,000 in North American box-office rentals, and was regarded as a box-office bomb at the time of its release. Variety listed the film as a box office disappointment.

=== Critical response ===
When Portrait of Jennie was released in December 1948, it was not a success, but it has come to be considered a classic in the fantasy genre. On the review aggregator website Rotten Tomatoes, 93% of 14 critics' reviews are positive. Upon its release, The New York Times reviewer Bosley Crowther called it "deficient and disappointing in the extreme;" but the Variety reviewers found the story was "told with style, taste and dignity."

Later film critics have also given the film strong praise. Leslie Halliwell wrote that it was "presented with superb persuasiveness by a first-class team of actors and technicians". Spanish surrealist filmmaker Luis Buñuel included the film on his list of the 10 best of all time.

"Portrait of Jennie," the title song, written by J. Russel Robinson, with lyrics by Gordon Burge, was performed by Ronnie Deauville. It has been covered since by many in jazz, often under the variant spelling "Portrait of Jenny," with early versions by Harry Babbitt, Jack Fina, Carmen Cavallaro, Freddy Martin, and Bill Snyder, and became a hit for Nat King Cole. Clifford Brown with Strings (1955) features the jazz trumpeter Clifford Brown performing an instrumental version with string accompaniment arranged by Neal Hefti. The jazz trombonist J. J. Johnson recorded an instrumental rendition in 1955 and one with choir accompaniment for his 1960 album Trombone and Voices. The song was revisited in 1958 by the pianist Red Garland on Manteca and again in 1966 by the jazz trumpeter Blue Mitchell on his Bring It Home to Me. Rob McConnell and the Boss Brass recorded a version featuring Guido Basso for their 1976 LP The Jazz Album that was heard widely on jazz radio stations.

=== Accolades ===
Joseph Cotten's performance as Eben Adams won the International Prize for Best Actor at the 1949 Venice International Film Festival.

The film is recognized by American Film Institute in these lists:

- 2002: AFI's 100 Years...100 Passions – Nominated
- 2008: AFI's 10 Top 10:
  - Nominated Fantasy Film

== Adaptations ==
Portrait of Jennie was presented on the radio program Academy Award on December 4, 1946. Joan Fontaine starred in the adaptation. Lux Radio Theatre presented an hour-long adaptation of the film on October 31, 1949, again starring Joseph Cotten, but this time with Anne Baxter in the role of Jennie.

== Sources ==
- Kovacs, Lee (2005). The Haunted Screen: Ghosts in Literature and Film. Jefferson, North Carolina: McFarland. ISBN 978-0-786-42605-8.
- Platte, Nathan (2018). Making Music in Selznick's Hollywood. Oxford, Oxfordshire: Oxford University Press. ISBN 978-0-199-37111-2.
- Thomson, David (1992). Showman: The Life of David O. Selznick. New York City, New York: Alfred A. Knopf. ISBN 978-0-394-56833-1.
