= Marty Martin (special effects artist) =

American special effects artist (1897–1964)

Martin Charles Martin (May 9, 1897, Colton, California – January 29, 1964, Los Angeles, California) was an American special effects artist and engineer, who received an Academy Scientific and Technical Award at the 1946 and 1948 Academy Awards.

Martin was born Martin Charles Swartz on May 9, 1897.

Martin worked in the RKO Radio Pictures Studio Miniature Department and was first awarded an Academy Scientific and Technical Award at the 1946 Academy Awards "for the design and construction of equipment providing visual bullet effects". He was jointly awarded the Oscar with Hal Adkins of RKO Pictures.

At the 1948 Academy Awards he won a second Technical Achievement Award "for the development of a new method of simulating falling snow on motion picture sets". Joint winners of this award were Jack Lannan, Russell Shearman and the RKO Radio Studio Special Effects Department.

He was also famous in the speedboating world as an amateur speedboat racer, and was profiled in the Nov. 1932 edition of MotorBoating magazine.

== Awards ==
- Academy Scientific and Technical Award Certificate, Class III
- 19th Academy Awards: Academy Scientific and Technical Award
  with Hal Adkins and the RKO Radio Studio Miniature Department
- 21st Academy Awards: Academy Scientific and Technical Award
  with Jack Lannan, Russell Shearman and the RKO Radio Studio Special Effects Department
