= Duel in the Sun (film) =

1946 film by King Vidor

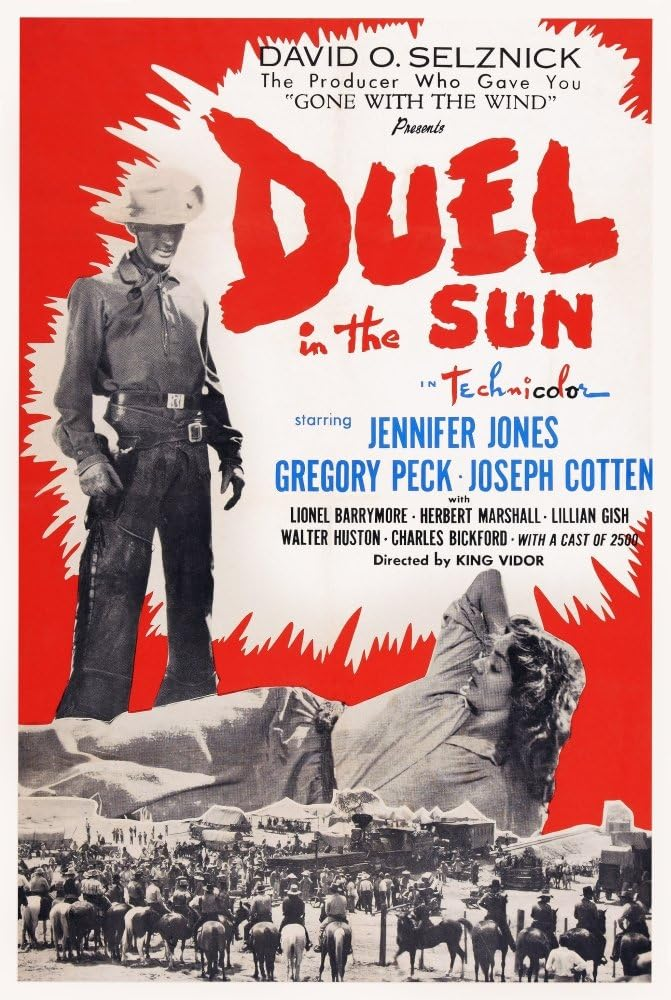
- Theatrical release poster
- Directed by: King Vidor
- Written by: Oliver H. P. Garrett (adaptation); Ben Hecht (uncredited)
- Screenplay by: David O. Selznick
- Based on: Duel in the Sun; 1944 novel by Niven Busch
- Produced by: David O. Selznick
- Starring: Jennifer Jones; Joseph Cotten; Gregory Peck
- Narrated by: Orson Welles
- Cinematography: Lee Garmes; Ray Rennahan; Harold Rosson
- Edited by: John D. Faure; Charles L. Freeman; Hal Kern; William H. Ziegler
- Music by: Dimitri Tiomkin
- Production company: Vanguard Films
- Distributed by: Selznick Releasing Organization
- Release dates: December 31, 1946 (Los Angeles, premiere)
- Running time: 145 minutes
- Country: United States
- Language: English
- Budget: $6.48 million
- Box office: $20.4 million

Duel in the Sun is a 1946 American epic psychological Western film directed by King Vidor, produced and written by David O. Selznick, and starring Jennifer Jones, Joseph Cotten, Gregory Peck, Lillian Gish, Walter Huston, and Lionel Barrymore. Based on the 1944 novel of the same name by Niven Busch, it follows a young orphaned Mestiza woman who experiences prejudice and forbidden love, while residing with her white relatives on a large Texas ranch.

== Plot ==
Pearl Chavez is orphaned after her father Scott Chavez kills her mother, having caught her with a lover. Before Scott Chavez is executed as a punishment for killing his wife, he arranges for his daughter Pearl to live with his second cousin and old sweetheart, Laura Belle in Texas.

Arriving by stagecoach, Pearl is met by Jesse McCanles, one of Laura Belle's two grown sons. He takes her to Spanish Bit, their enormous cattle ranch. The gentle and gracious Laura Belle is happy to welcome her to their home, but not so her husband, the Senator Jackson McCanles, who uses a wheelchair. He calls Pearl "a half-breed" and jealously despises Pearl's father.

The second son, Lewt, is a ladies' man with a personality quite unlike that of his gentlemanly brother Jesse. He expresses his interest in Pearl in direct terms and she takes a strong dislike to him. Laura Belle calls in Mr. Jubal Crabbe, the "Sinkiller", a gun-toting preacher, to counsel Pearl on how to avoid the evils of temptation. Pearl is determined to remain "a good girl".

When she submits to Lewt's aggressive advances one night, Pearl is angry with him and ashamed of her behavior. She also cannot help but be flattered by his lust and attentions. Jesse, meanwhile, is ostracized by his father and no longer welcome at the ranch after siding with railroad men, headed by Mr. Langford, against the Senator's personal interests. Jesse is in love with Pearl but he leaves for Austin to pursue a political career and becomes engaged to Helen Langford, Langford's daughter.

Offended when Lewt reneges on a promise to marry her, Pearl takes up with Sam Pierce, a neighboring rancher who is smitten with her. She does not love him but says yes to his proposal. Before they can be married, however, Lewt picks a fight with Pierce in a saloon and guns him down. He insists that Pearl can belong only to him. Lewt becomes a wanted man.

On the run from the law, Lewt finds time to derail a train and occasionally drop by the ranch late at night and press his attentions on Pearl. She cannot resist her desire for him and lies for Lewt to the law, hiding him in her room. Afterward, he walks out on her, despite her pleas that she loves him.

Laura Belle's health takes a turn for the worse and the Senator admits his love for her before she dies. Jesse returns to visit but is too late; his mother is dead. The Senator continues to shun him, as does Lewt, their family feud finally resulting in a showdown. Lewt tosses a gun to his unarmed brother but Jesse stands his ground without attempting to pick it up. Jesse warns that Lewt will eventually be hanged as a murderer, and Lewt responds by shooting Jesse.

The Senator's old friend, Lem Smoot, tells him that Jesse's wound is not mortal and the old man softens up towards his son and reconciles. Pearl is relieved that Jesse is going to survive. When Helen arrives, she invites Pearl to leave Spanish Bit forever and come live with them in Austin. Pearl agrees, but when she is tipped off by one of the Spanish Bit hands that Lewt intends to come after Jesse again, she arms herself and engages in a shootout with Lewt in the desert. They die in each other's arms.

== Cast ==
- Jennifer Jones as Pearl Chavez
- Joseph Cotten as Jesse McCanles
- Gregory Peck as Lewton "Lewt" McCanles
- Lionel Barrymore as Senator Jackson McCanles
- Herbert Marshall as Scott Chavez
- Lillian Gish as Laura Belle McCanles
- Walter Huston as Jubal Crabbe, The Sinkiller
- Charles Bickford as Sam Pierce
- Harry Carey as Lem Smoot
- Charles Dingle as Sheriff Hardy
- Sidney Blackmer as The "Lover" of Mrs. Chavez
- Butterfly McQueen as Vashti
- Otto Kruger as Mr. Langford
- Joan Tetzel as Helen Langford
- Tilly Losch as Mrs. Chavez
- Scott McKay as Sid
- Hank Bell as Ranch Hand (uncredited)
- Bob McKenzie as Bartender Zeke (uncredited)

== Themes and analysis ==
Duel in the Sun was released the same year as John Ford's film My Darling Clementine and has been described as taking "the moment of sadism" from Ford's film to extremes. Released in the postwar years during a period of economic boom and the changing role of women in society including marriage, sexuality and inclusion in the work force left some Americans feeling alienated. Psychological westerns, popular in the 1940s, featured characters plagued by a dark torment that reflected the post-war attitudes. The march of progress is symbolized by an advancing railroad cutting across a senator's cattle lands.

The "civilizing forces" of the American West are represented by the characters of Pearl's father, Laura Belle and Jesse, while Lewt and Senator McCanles are constant reminders that she is not part of the white patriarchal order. After being raped by Lewt, Pearl is not able to meet the Victorian-era standards for moral conduct. Her identity as part Indian is "linked to notions of uncontrollable drives, the fading of subjectivity, and the loss of conscious agency". Believing she encouraged the rape, Jesse ends their romantic relationship. The "dark" or savage element of her sexuality and unrestrained passions has a racial dimension, contrasted with the white feminine ideal in the film's imagery, it is something needing to be tamed. She is "too sexual to be a proper wife, too dark to be a comfortable part of [white] society, and too passionate to be controlled with anything but violence".

As Pearl is already "spoiled" by the rape she no longer needs to control her sexuality and enters into a sadomasochistic relationship with Lewt who treats her viciously and with racist abuse like calling her a "bob-tailed little half-breed". Marriage with Pearl is out of the question for Lewt due to his father's expectations that the family ranch not be "turned into an Injun reservation" though Lewt continues to exhibit jealous, controlling behaviors including attempting to murder his brother Jesse when he makes plans for Pearl to attend school in Austin. While in many ways the typical hero of American westerns, Lewt crosses over into the realm of the "savage" or "uncivilized". The violence Pearl encounters from Lewt leads her to develop gradually into a femme fatale type character who eventually murders him even as she loves him in order to protect the goodness of Jesse and his fiancée Helen.

== Production ==
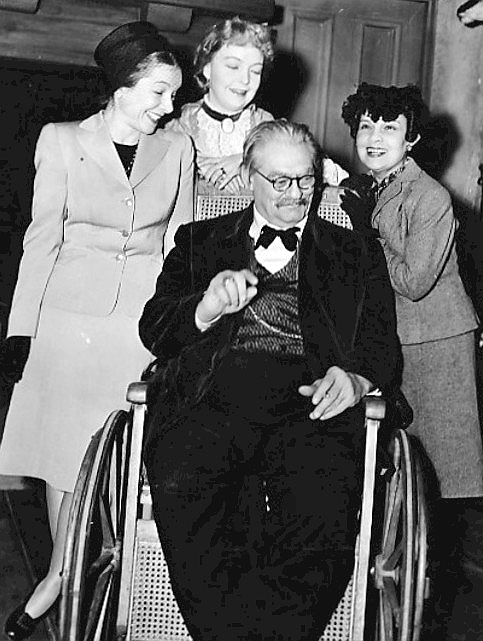
Clockwise from left: Helen Hayes, Lillian Gish, Anita Loos and Lionel Barrymore on the set of Duel in the Sun.

=== Development ===
The film was adapted by Oliver H. P. Garrett and David O. Selznick from the novel by Niven Busch.

Busch wrote the novel after working on the script for The Westerner which made him convinced he could write a better Western. He went to Arizona to research a book and got the idea for the novel. According to Busch: "The idea was, simply, instead of writing about two guys and wondering how to get a girl in, to write about a girl and let the guys come in as they happened. Having a woman was new, especially a very sexy woman in a family consisting entirely of men. It was dynamite—like the whore and the lighthouse." Busch said the novel "had great success right off" and "was a huge bestseller in paperback".

Busch set up the film as producer at RKO and hired Garrett to write the script. John Wayne was going to play Lewt because he had an obligation with the studio. Busch had difficulty casting the female lead. He wanted Veronica Lake; they offered it to Hedy Lamarr, who fell pregnant. Busch's then-wife Terese Wright did not want to play the role as she felt it did not suit her. Then the role was offered to Jennifer Jones. Her lover (and future husband) David O. Selznick started making a series of demands so RKO's head of production Charles Koerner sold the project at a profit to Selznick to produce.

The film proved to be a turbulent experience for Selznick and Vidor, with several directors being left uncredited for their work in the film, such as Josef von Sternberg, William Dieterle, William Cameron Menzies, Otto Brower, Sidney Franklin and Selznick himself. Production unit managers Glenn Cook and William McGarry were also uncredited.

Busch said Selznick "had deteriorated a lot. He was taking sleeping pills at night and benzedrine by day. And he was beginning to get very sloppy and very arrogant. Then he tried to hoist Vidor out of there".

=== Filming ===
Duel in the Sun had a protracted filming process that lasted approximately a year and a half, with principal photography beginning March 1, 1945, and concluding in September 1946. The film was largely shot in Wildwood Regional Park in Thousand Oaks, California. The train derailment scenes were filmed on the Sierra Railroad in Tuolumne County, California, using a combination of a real train and large scale models.

== Release ==
=== Censorship ===
As shot, the film could not make it past the Hays Code censors or religious review boards and so was heavily edited by state censor boards while several states (mostly in the South but also in New England) refused to license the film. It was nicknamed Lust in the Dust, which eventually became the name of another film. A scene in which Pearl does a seductive dance for Lewton was cut from the film before it was released.

=== Box office ===
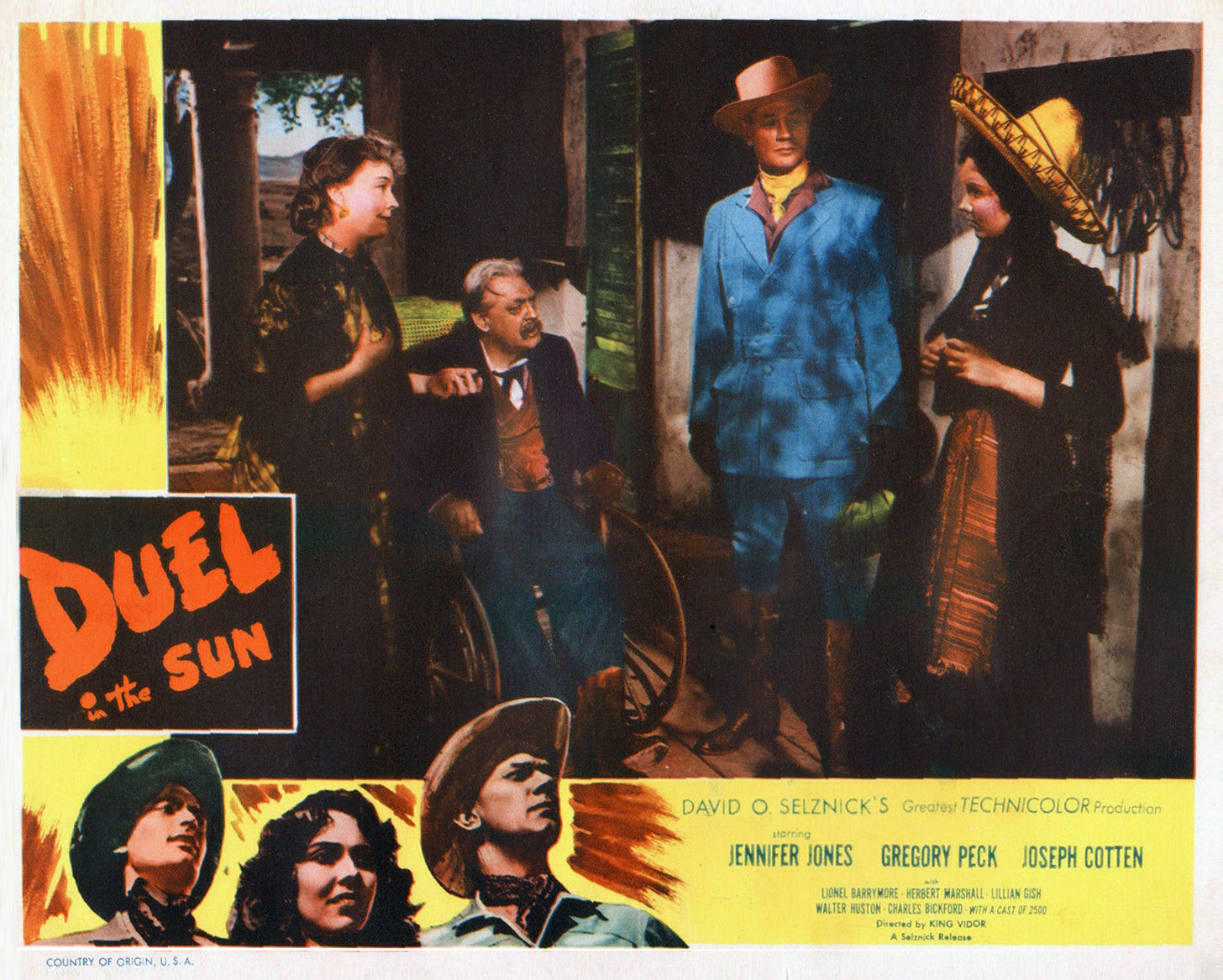
Re-release lobby card

Duel in the Sun had its world premiere in Los Angeles on December 31, 1946 at the Egyptian Theatre. It opened in New York City on May 8, 1947. The film was shown at increased admission prices which boosted its earnings to $10 million in rentals in the United States and Canada during its initial release, making it the highest-grossing film of 1946.

Because of the film's huge production costs, rumored to be over $6,000,000 (equivalent to approximately $99.1 million in 2025), its $2,000,000 advertising campaign (unheard of at the time) and Selznick's costly distribution tactics, the film only broke even.

=== Critical reaction ===
Bosley Crowther of The New York Times wrote: "For, despite all his flashy exploitation, Mr. Selznick can't long hide the fact that his multimillion-dollar Western is a spectacularly disappointing job... Those are also harsh words about a picture which promises very much and which, even for all its disappointments, has some flashes of brilliance in it. But the ultimate banality of the story and its juvenile slobbering over sex (or should we say "primitive passion", as says a ponderous foreword?) compels their use." William Brogdon of Variety gave the film a favorable review: "As a production it adds no class distinction to David O. Selznick but assures him a top commercial success. The star lineup is impressive. Vastness of the western locale is splendidly displayed in color by mobile cameras. Footage is overwhelmingly expansive, too much so at times considering its length."

Harrison's Reports deemed the film as a "'glorified' Western, produced on an immense scale. Its theme is tragic love-making, with tragic consequences...Some of the photographic shots are extremely effective; they make the film look immense." Edwin Schallert of the Los Angeles Times praised the film as "a picture of terrific in fact, well-nigh bewildering impact. It embodies a strange tragical drama of love, hate and death, set against wild western desert wastes and mesas and fierce mountain fastnesses. Historical in pattern, the narrative, as told on the screen, seems to draw from the most elemental sources, with few of its characters that are not, at times, motivated by the most primitive and even brutal impulses. A tremendously strong production, lurid and violent in the handling of many of its scenes, it still possesses a bigness of design which commands appreciation and respect."

In an interview, Niven Busch (author of the original novel) said:

Great showmanship. It had a few good scenes, and it had a big expansive canvas. It wasn't the way I would have made the picture. But I took the money and ran. It sold a lot of books for me, so why should I complain? It was an extravaganza rather than realistic. There were more people in the charge down to the railroad than there were in Texas at that time. But what a grand piece of panorama. It did not have the quality of Gone with the Wind, but it had the same kind of scope.

Pauline Kael, famed film critic of the time, was biting when she said "only snobs howl at Duel in the Sun."

=== Awards and nominations ===
Award	Category	Nominee(s)	Result	Ref.
Academy Awards	Best Actress	Jennifer Jones	Nominated	
Academy Awards	Best Supporting Actress	Lillian Gish	Nominated	
International Film Music Critics Association Awards	Best New Release, Re-Release or Re-Recording of an Existing Score	Dimitri Tiomkin, Nic Raine, James Fitzpatrick, Jim Titus, Frank K. Dewald, and The City of Prague Philharmonic Orchestra & Chorus	Nominated	
Venice Film Festival	Cinecittà Cup	David O. Selznick	Won	
Venice Film Festival	International Award	King Vidor	Nominated	

=== Home media ===
The film never received a LaserDisc release, though 20th Century Fox Home Entertainment did issue a VHS edition of the film. Anchor Bay Entertainment released the film on DVD in 1999 in a standard edition, followed by a "Roadshow Edition" (featuring its original theatrical musical overture, narration, and outro) in 2001.

Metro-Goldwyn-Mayer Home Entertainment released a subsequent DVD edition on May 25, 2004. The film was released for the first time on Blu-ray by Kino Lorber (in the "Roadshow Edition") on August 15, 2017.

== Legacy ==
The film was one of the first to have its own record album, featuring selections from Dimitri Tiomkin's musical score. Rather than use excerpts from the soundtrack, RCA Victor recorded some of the music with the Boston Pops Orchestra conducted by Arthur Fiedler. The music was split into approximately three-minute sections and released on 10-inch (254-mm) 78-rpm discs in 1946. A musical prelude lasting nine and a half minutes as well as a two-minute overture preceded the film with Tiomkin conducting the studio orchestra; this recording was later issued on LP and CD.

Duel in the Sun was first shown on American television on ABC on January 23, 1972.

Martin Scorsese has stated to James Lipton on Inside the Actors Studio that this was the first film he saw and holds it in high regard. He mentioned it in his documentary of American films. David Stratton has also stated a similar high opinion of the film, at the ACMI's "Desert Island Flicks" on March 10, 2010. He first saw the film at the age of six.

When explaining the aesthetic of NFL Films, Steve Sabol would point to the climax where Jennifer Jones climbs a mountain. King Vidor uses extreme closeups of her sweating face and bloody hands, and Sabol felt it "would be a great way to show pro football."

Many of the film's plot points (such as the Pearl/Lewt/Sam love triangle) were reused in the Hindi film Janbaaz (1986). In February 2020, the film was shown at the 70th Berlin International Film Festival, as part of a retrospective dedicated to King Vidor's career.

Duel in the Sun was remade as Saiyan in Hindi and was released in 1951.

== See also ==
- List of American films of 1946
- Lillian Gish filmography

== Sources ==
- Jensen, Larry (2018). Hollywood's Railroads: Sierra Railroad. Vol. Two. Sequim, Washington: Cochetopa Press. ISBN 978-0-692-06472-6.
- Marubbio, M. Elise (2006). Killing the Indian Maiden: Images of Native American Women in Film. Lexington, Kentucky: University Press of Kentucky. ISBN 978-0-813-13694-3.
- Randall, Laura (2009). 60 Hikes Within 60 Miles: Los Angeles: Including San Bernardino, Pasadena, and Oxnard. Birmingham, Alabama: Menasha Ridge Press. ISBN 978-0-897-32707-7.
- Schad, Jerry (2009). Los Angeles County: A Comprehensive Hiking Guide. Birmingham, Alabama: Wilderness Press. ISBN 978-0-899-97639-6.
- Thomson, David (1993). Showman: The Life of David O. Selznick. London, England: André Deutsch. ISBN 978-0-233-98791-0.
