= Joseph McMillan Johnson =

American film director

Joseph McMillan Johnson (September 15, 1912 – April 17, 1990) was a leading Hollywood art director born in Los Angeles.

He was graduated from USC with a degree in architecture before attending Art Center College of Design in Pasadena. He was working for well-known architect Kem Weber when he was hired by David O. Selznick in 1938. He worked as a sketch artist for designs on Gone with the Wind in 1939, and was heavily involved with the creation of the special effects for The Wizard of Oz that same year. He worked on most of Selznick's major productions including Duel in the Sun (1946), The Paradine Case (1947) and Portrait of Jennie (1948), for which he won an Oscar for the visual effects.

A frequent collaborator with Alfred Hitchcock, (Rear Window in 1954 was followed by To Catch a Thief in 1955 which earned him another Academy Award nomination), Johnson was forced to take a break from Hollywood during the McCarthy witch hunts. He returned to his first career of architecture for a year, and worked with many notable architects in the LA area, many of whom having been his classmates at USC. When the McCarthy hysteria of Communism settled down, Johnson returned to Hollywood, earning Oscar nominations for his art direction on The Facts of Life in 1960 and the expensive remake of Mutiny on the Bounty in 1962, and for visual effects on George Stevens's religious epic The Greatest Story Ever Told (1965) and the John Sturges thriller Ice Station Zebra in 1968.

He retired in 1971 and died of a cerebral haemorrhage in 1990.
