= Clarence Slifer =

American special effects artist

- Born: August 31, 1904
- Died: 1993 (aged 88); Grundy Center, Iowa, United States
- Occupation: Special effects artist
- Years active: 1931-1968

Clarence Slifer (August 31, 1904 – 1993) was an American special effects artist. He won an Academy Award for Best Special Effects and was nominated for another one in the same category.

== Selected filmography ==
Slifer won an Academy Award for Best Special Effects and was nominated for another one:

Won

- Portrait of Jennie (1948)

Nominated

- The North Star (1943)
