= 21st Academy Awards =

- Date: March 24, 1949
- Site: Academy Awards Theatre, West Hollywood, California, USA
- Hosted by: Robert Montgomery

Highlights
- Best Picture: Hamlet
- Most awards: Hamlet (4)
- Most nominations: Johnny Belinda (12)

The 21st Academy Awards were held on March 24, 1949, honoring the films of 1948. The ceremony was moved from the Shrine Auditorium to the Academy's own theater, primarily because the major Hollywood studios had withdrawn their financial support in order to address rumors that they had been trying to influence voters. This year marked the first time a non-Hollywood production (Laurence Olivier's Hamlet) won Best Picture, and the first time an individual (Olivier) directed himself in an Oscar-winning performance.

The Academy Award for Best Costume Design was introduced this year. Like Best Cinematography and Best Set Decoration, it was split into Color and Black & White categories.

John Huston directed his father, Walter Huston, to the Academy Award for Best Supporting Actor for his role as Howard in The Treasure of the Sierra Madre, a unique accomplishment. The Huston family won three Oscars that evening (John won for Best Director and Best Screenplay, both for the same film). Humphrey Bogart's lack of a nomination for Best Actor has been since considered one of the Academy's greatest slights.

Joan of Arc set a record by receiving seven nominations without being nominated for Best Picture; this stood until They Shoot Horses, Don't They? (1969) received nine nominations at the 42nd Academy Awards without one for Best Picture. Walter Wanger, producer of the film, was not pleased to see the film avoid a Best Picture nomination, and turned down a special Oscar designed to make up for this slight.

Hamlet became the fifth film to win Best Picture without a screenwriting nomination; the next to do so would be The Sound of Music at the 38th Academy Awards. Jane Wyman became the first performer since the silent era to win an Oscar for a performance with no lines; Johnny Belinda was the fourth film to receive nominations in all four acting categories.

In addition, Johnny Belinda set the record for most Oscars lost with 11 (1 for 12). It has since been tied with Becket (1 for 12), The Turning Point (0 for 11), The Color Purple (0 for 11), The Power of the Dog (1 for 12), and Emilia Pérez (2 for 13). However, its record was broken at the 98th Academy Awards by Sinners (4 for 16).

I Remember Mama received four acting nominations but not one for Best Picture, tying the record set by My Man Godfrey in 1936. Two more films to date have tied this record: Othello (1965) and Doubt (2008).

== Winners and nominees ==
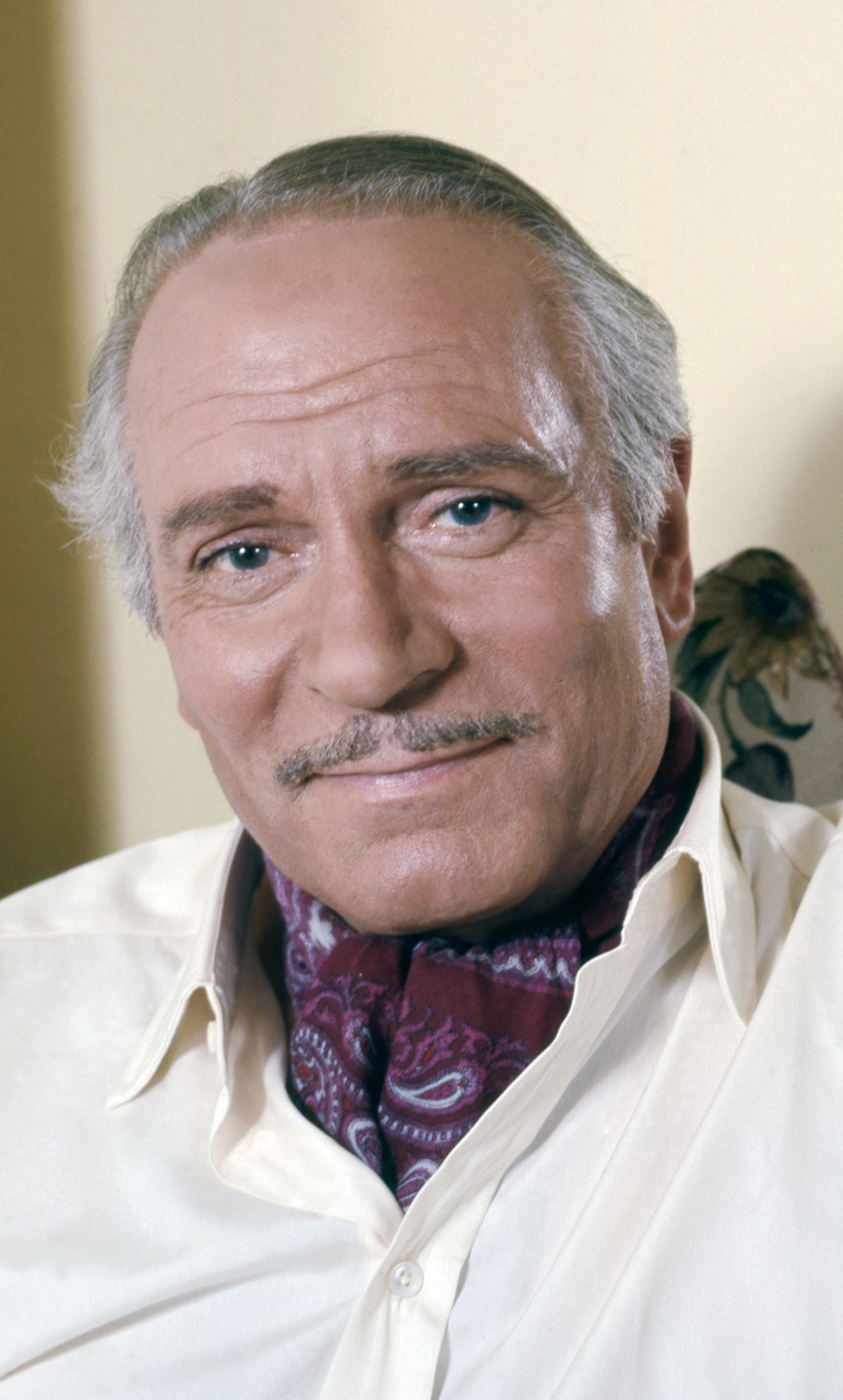
Laurence Olivier; Best Picture and Best Actor winner

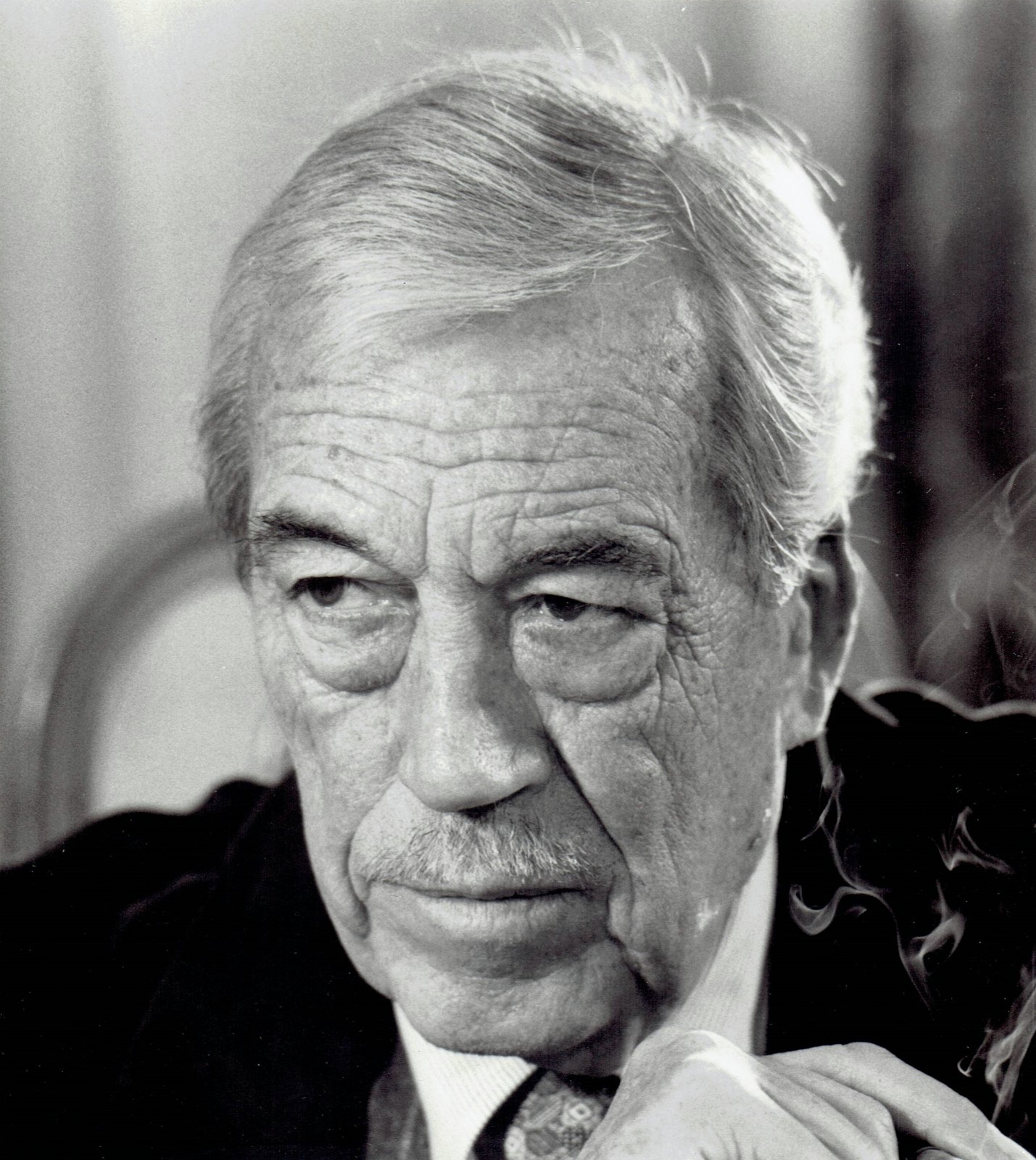
John Huston; Best Director and Best Screenplay winner

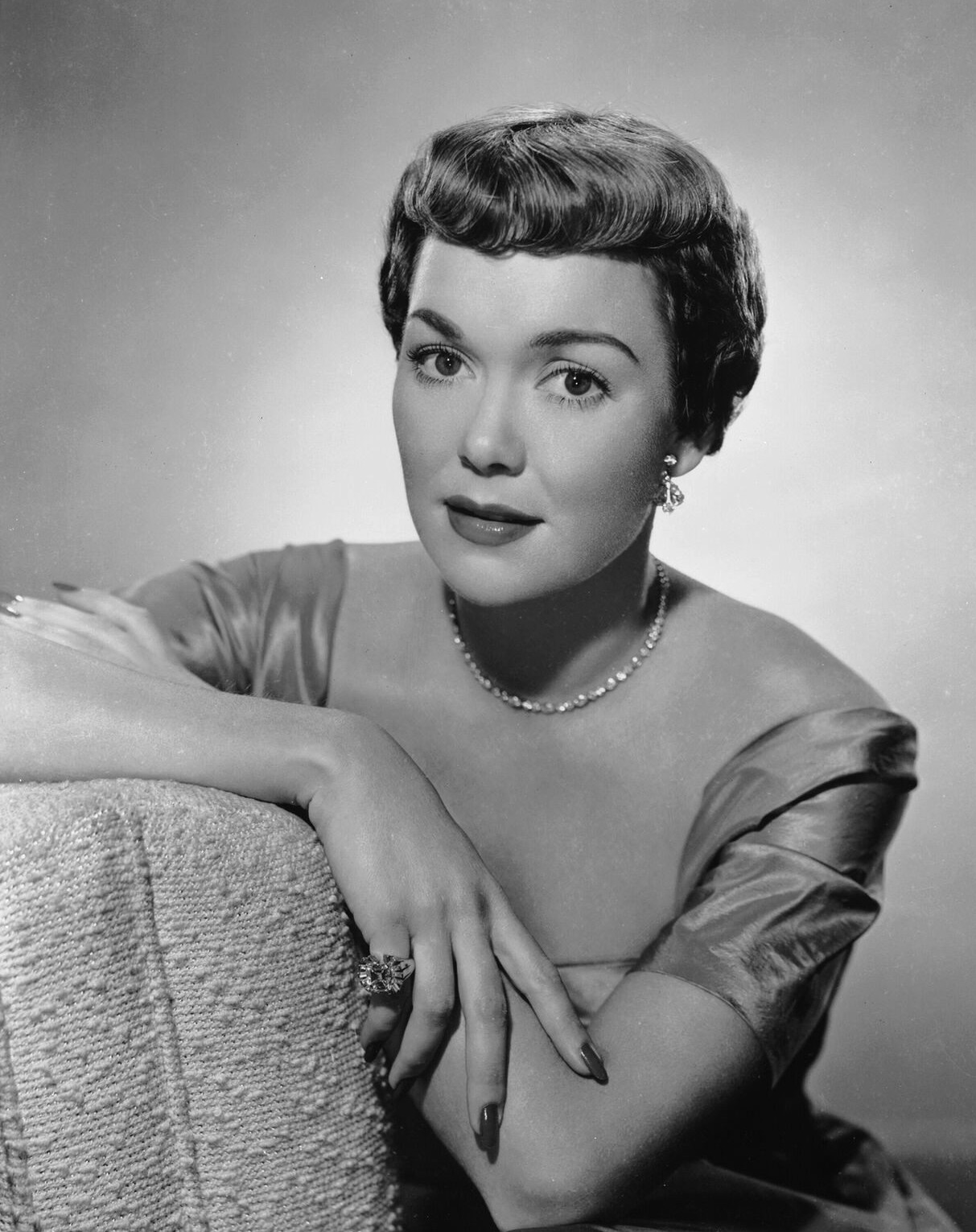
Jane Wyman; Best Actress winner

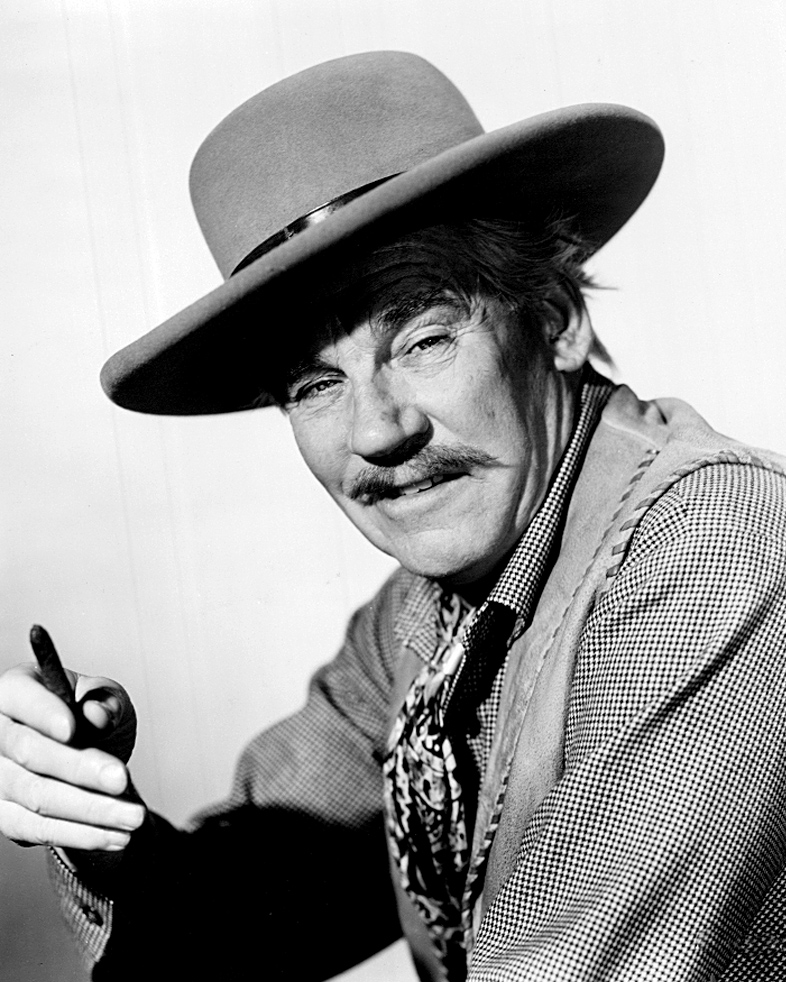
Walter Huston; Best Supporting Actor winner

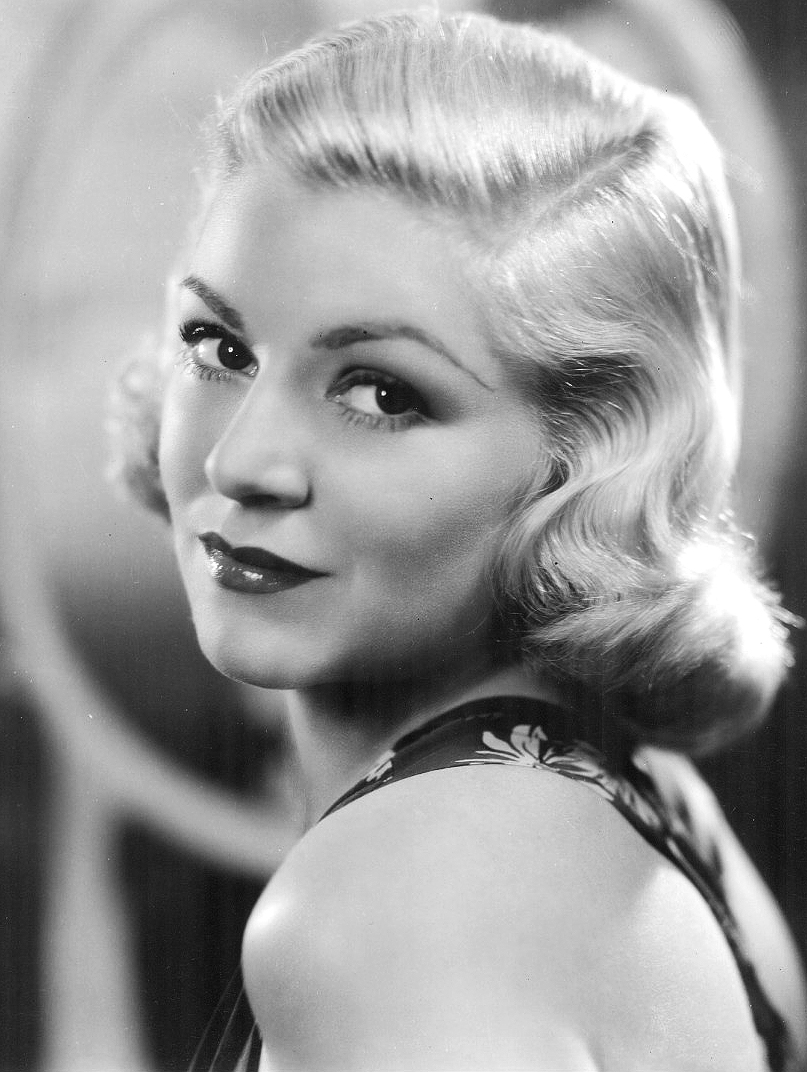
Claire Trevor; Best Supporting Actress winner

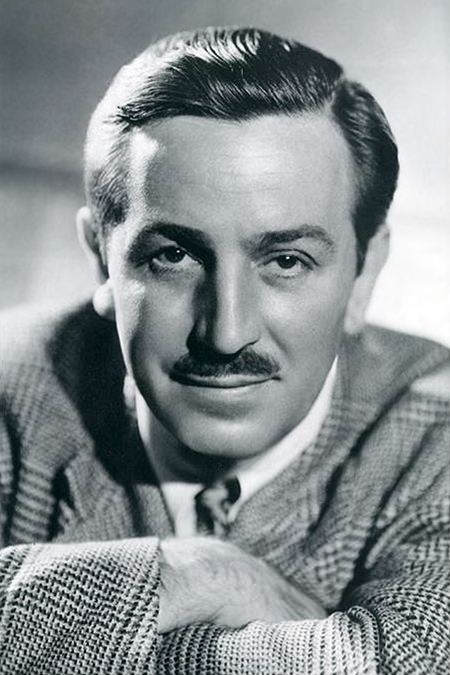
Walt Disney; Best Live Action Short Subject, Two Reel winner

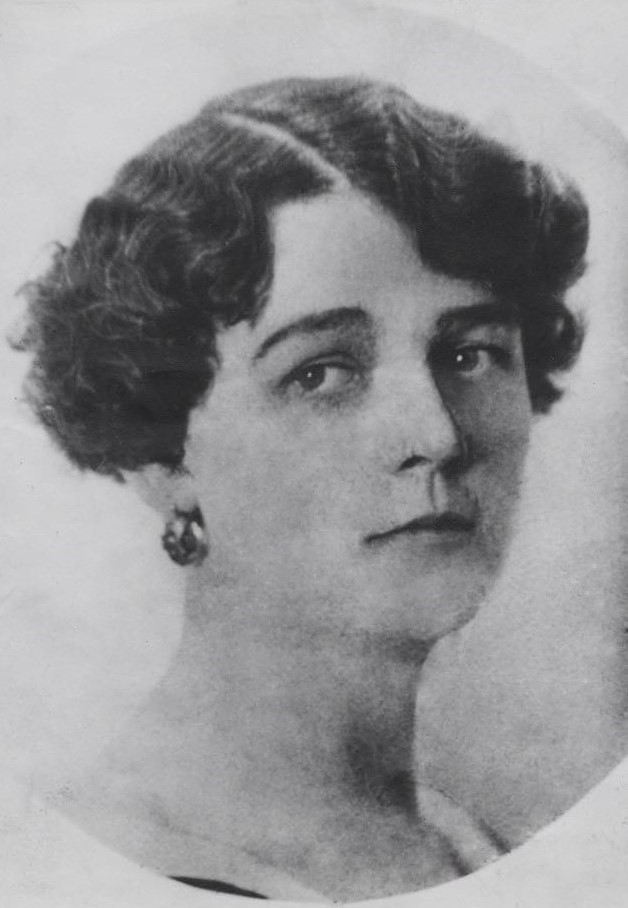
Barbara Karinska; Best Costume Design, Color co-winner

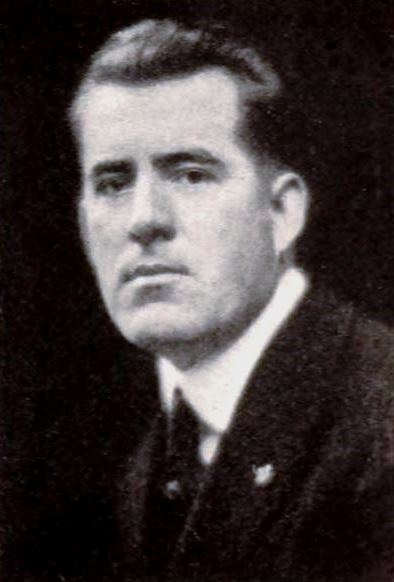
Paul Eagler; Best Special Effects co-winner

=== Awards ===
Nominees were announced on February 10, 1949. Winners are listed first and highlighted in boldface.

**Best Motion Picture**: **Hamlet – Laurence Olivier for Universal Studios and General Film Distributors, Ltd.**; Johnny Belinda – Jerry Wald for Warner Bros.; The Red Shoes – Michael Powell and Emeric Pressburger for Eagle-Lion Films and General Film Distributors, Ltd.; The Snake Pit – Anatole Litvak and Robert Bassler for 20th Century Fox; The Treasure of the Sierra Madre – Henry Blanke for Warner Bros.	**Best Directing**: **John Huston – The Treasure of the Sierra Madre**; Laurence Olivier – Hamlet; Jean Negulesco – Johnny Belinda; Fred Zinnemann – The Search; Anatole Litvak – The Snake Pit
**Best Actor**: **Laurence Olivier – Hamlet as Hamlet**; Lew Ayres – Johnny Belinda as Dr. Robert Richardson; Montgomery Clift – The Search as Ralph "Steve" Stevenson; Dan Dailey – When My Baby Smiles at Me as "Skid" Johnson; Clifton Webb – Sitting Pretty as Lynn Belvedere	**Best Actress**: **Jane Wyman – Johnny Belinda as Belinda MacDonald**; Ingrid Bergman – Joan of Arc as Jeanne d'Arc; Olivia de Havilland – The Snake Pit as Virginia Stuart Cunningham; Irene Dunne – I Remember Mama as Marta "Mama" Hanson; Barbara Stanwyck – Sorry, Wrong Number as Leona Stevenson
**Best Actor in a Supporting Role**: **Walter Huston – The Treasure of the Sierra Madre as Howard**; Charles Bickford – Johnny Belinda as Black MacDonald; José Ferrer – Joan of Arc as The Dauphin, later Charles VII of France; Oscar Homolka – I Remember Mama as Uncle Chris Halvorsen; Cecil Kellaway – The Luck of the Irish as Horace	**Best Actress in a Supporting Role**: **Claire Trevor – Key Largo as Gaye Dawn**; Barbara Bel Geddes – I Remember Mama as Katrin Hanson; Ellen Corby – I Remember Mama as Aunt Trina; Agnes Moorehead – Johnny Belinda as Aggie MacDonald; Jean Simmons – Hamlet as Ophelia
**Best Writing (Motion Picture Story)**: **The Search – Richard Schweizer and David Wechsler**; Louisiana Story – Robert Flaherty and Frances Flaherty; The Naked City – Malvin Wald; Red River – Borden Chase; The Red Shoes – Emeric Pressburger	**Best Writing (Screenplay)**: **The Treasure of the Sierra Madre – John Huston from The Treasure of the Sierra Madre by B. Traven**; A Foreign Affair – Charles Brackett, Billy Wilder, and Richard L. Breen from a story by David Shaw; Johnny Belinda – Irma von Cube and Allen Vincent from Johnny Belinda by Elmer Blaney Harris; The Search – Richard Schweizer and David Wechsler; The Snake Pit – Frank Partos and Millen Brand from The Snake Pit by Mary Jane Ward
**Best Documentary (Feature)**: **The Secret Land – Orville O. Dull**; The Quiet One – Janice Loeb	**Best Documentary (Short Subject)**: **Toward Independence – United States Army**; Heart to Heart – Herbert Morgan; Operation Vittles – United States Army Air Force
**Best Short Subject (One-Reel)**: **Symphony of a City – Edmund H. Reek**; Annie Was a Wonder – Herbert Moulton; Cinderella Horse – Gordon Hollingshead; So You Want to Be on the Radio – Gordon Hollingshead; You Can't Win – Pete Smith	**Best Short Subject (Two-Reel)**: **Seal Island – Walt Disney**; Calgary Stampede – Gordon Hollingshead; Going to Blazes – Herbert Morgan; Samba-Mania – Harry Grey; Snow Capers – Thomas Mead
**Best Short Subject (Cartoon)**: **The Little Orphan – Fred Quimby**; Mickey and the Seal – Walt Disney; Mouse Wreckers – Edward Selzer; Robin Hoodlum – United Productions of America; Tea for Two Hundred – Walt Disney	**Best Music (Music Score of a Dramatic or Comedy Picture)**: **The Red Shoes – Brian Easdale**; Hamlet – William Walton; Joan of Arc – Hugo Friedhofer; Johnny Belinda – Max Steiner; The Snake Pit – Alfred Newman
**Best Music (Scoring of a Musical Picture)**: **Easter Parade – Johnny Green and Roger Edens**; The Emperor Waltz – Victor Young; The Pirate – Lennie Hayton; Romance on the High Seas – Ray Heindorf; When My Baby Smiles at Me – Alfred Newman	**Best Music (Song)**: **"Buttons and Bows" from The Paleface – Music and Lyrics by Jay Livingston and Ray Evans**; "For Every Man There's a Woman" from Casbah – Music by Harold Arlen; Lyrics by Leo Robin; "It's Magic" from Romance on the High Seas – Music by Jule Styne; Lyrics by Sammy Cahn; "This is the Moment" from That Lady in Ermine – Music by Frederick Hollander; Lyrics by Leo Robin; "The Woody Woodpecker Song" from Wet Blanket Policy – Music and Lyrics by Ramey Idriss and George Tibbles
**Best Sound Recording**: **The Snake Pit – Thomas T. Moulton**; Johnny Belinda – Nathan Levinson; Moonrise – Daniel J. Bloomberg	**Best Art Direction (Black-and-White)**: **Hamlet – Art Direction: Roger K. Furse; Set Decoration: Carmen Dillon**; Johnny Belinda – Art Direction: Robert M. Haas; Set Decoration: William O. Wallace
**Best Art Direction (Color)**: **The Red Shoes – Art Direction: Hein Heckroth; Set Decoration: Arthur Lawson**; Joan of Arc – Art Direction: Richard Day; Set Decoration: Casey Roberts and Joseph Kish	**Best Cinematography (Black-and-White)**: **The Naked City – William Daniels**; A Foreign Affair – Charles Lang; I Remember Mama – Nicholas Musuraca; Johnny Belinda – Ted D. McCord; Portrait of Jennie – Joseph August
**Best Cinematography (Color)**: **Joan of Arc – Joseph Valentine, William V. Skall, and Winton C. Hoch**; Green Grass of Wyoming – Charles G. Clarke; The Loves of Carmen – William Snyder; The Three Musketeers – Robert Planck	**Best Costume Design (Black-and-White)**: **Hamlet – Roger K. Furse**; B.F.'s Daughter – Irene Lentz
**Best Costume Design (Color)**: **Joan of Arc – Dorothy Jeakins and Barbara Karinska**; The Emperor Waltz – Edith Head and Gile Steele	**Best Film Editing**: **The Naked City – Paul Weatherwax**; Joan of Arc – Frank Sullivan; Johnny Belinda – David Weisbart; Red River – Christian Nyby; The Red Shoes – Reginald Mills
**Best Special Effects**: **Portrait of Jennie – Special Visual Effects: Paul Eagler, Joseph McMillan Johnson, Russell Shearman and Clarence Slifer; Special Audible Effects: Charles L. Freeman and James G. Stewart**; Deep Waters – Special Visual Effects: Ralph Hammeras, Fred Sersen and Edward Snyder; Special Audible Effects: Roger Heman Sr.

=== Special Foreign Language Film Award ===
- To Monsieur Vincent (France) - voted by the Academy Board of Governors as the most outstanding foreign language film released in the United States during 1948.

=== Special awards ===
- To Ivan Jandl, for the outstanding juvenile performance of 1948, as Karel Malik in The Search.
- To Sid Grauman, master showman, who raised the standard of exhibition of motion pictures.
- To Adolph Zukor, a man who has been called the father of the feature film in America, for his services to the industry over a period of forty years.
- To Walter Wanger for distinguished service to the industry in adding to its moral stature in the world community by his production of the picture Joan of Arc.
- To Jean Hersholt - in recognition of his service to the Academy during four terms as president.

=== Irving G. Thalberg Memorial Award ===
- Jerry Wald

== Presenters and performers ==
=== Presenters ===
- Ethel Barrymore (Presenter: Best Motion Picture)
- Ann Blyth (Presenter: Best Sound Recording)
- Frank Borzage (Presenter: Best Director)
- Ronald Colman (Presenter: Best Actress)
- Wendell Corey (Presenter: Best Film Editing)
- Jeanne Crain (Presenter: Short Subject Awards)
- Arlene Dahl (Presenter: Best Art Direction)
- Glenn Ford (Presenter: Best Special Effects)
- Ava Gardner (Presenter: Documentary Awards)
- Kathryn Grayson (Presenter: Music Awards)
- Edmund Gwenn (Presenter: Best Supporting Actress)
- Jean Hersholt (Presenter: Honorary Awards)
- Celeste Holm (Presenter: Best Supporting Actor)
- Louis Jourdan (Presenter: Best Foreign Film)
- Deborah Kerr (Presenter: Writing Awards)
- George Murphy (Presenter: Scientific & Technical Awards)
- Robert Ryan (Presenter: Best Cinematography)
- Elizabeth Taylor (Presenter: Best Costume Design)
- Loretta Young (Presenter: Best Actor)

=== Performers ===
- Harry Babbitt and Gloria Wood ("The Woody Woodpecker Song")
- Doris Day ("It's Magic" from Romance on the High Seas)
- Gordon MacRae ("For Every Man There's a Woman" from Casbah)
- Jane Russell ("Buttons and Bows" from The Paleface)
- Jo Stafford ("This Is the Moment" from That Lady in Ermine)

== Multiple nominations and awards ==
Films with multiple nominations
Nominations	Film
12	Johnny Belinda
7	Hamlet
7	Joan of Arc
6	The Snake Pit
5	I Remember Mama
5	The Red Shoes
4	The Search
4	The Treasure of the Sierra Madre
3	The Naked City
2	The Emperor Waltz
2	A Foreign Affair
2	Portrait of Jennie
2	Red River
2	Romance on the High Seas
2	When My Baby Smiles at Me

Films with multiple awards
Awards	Film
4	Hamlet
3	The Treasure of the Sierra Madre
2	Joan of Arc
2	The Naked City
2	The Red Shoes

== See also ==
- 6th Golden Globe Awards
- 1948 in film
- 1st Primetime Emmy Awards
- 2nd British Academy Film Awards
- 3rd Tony Awards
