= Johnny Belinda =

Johnny Belinda may refer to:

- Johnny Belinda (play), a 1940 Broadway play by Elmer Blaney Harris, including a list of adaptations
- Johnny Belinda (1948 film), a 1948 American drama film based on the play
- Johnny Belinda (1959 film), a 1959 Australian television play
- Johnny Belinda (1967 film), a 1967 television movie based on the play
- Johnny Belinda, a 1968 musical play by Mavor Moore and John Fenwick
- Johnny Belinda (1982 film), a 1982 film starring Rosanna Arquette
- "Johnny Belinda", the opening track of the 1987 self-titled album by San Francisco band Voice Farm
- "Johnny Belinda", a track on Active Child's 2011 debut album You Are All I See
