= Golden Globe Award for Best English-Language Foreign Film =

Film award category

Golden Globe for Best English-Language Foreign Film
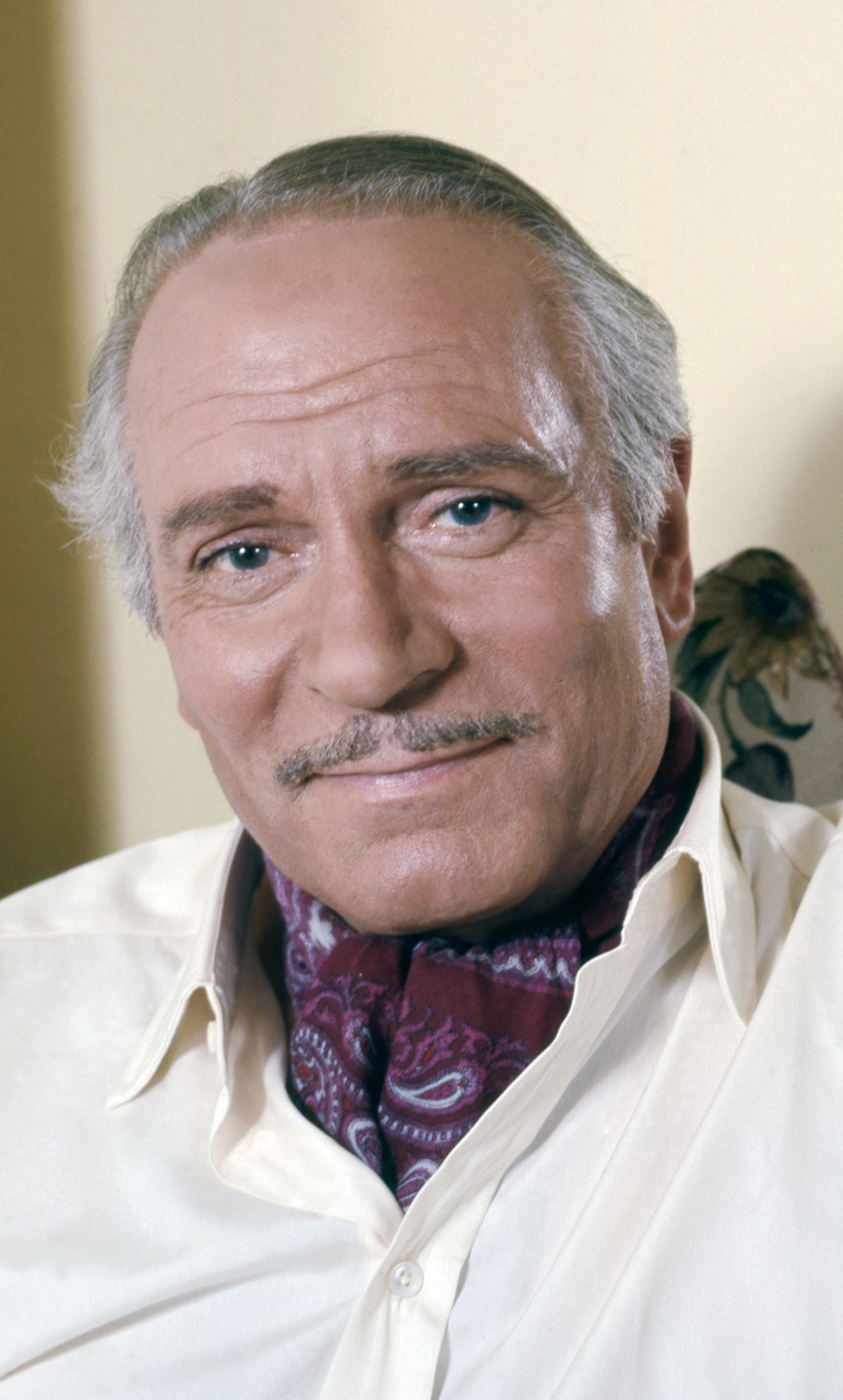
- Laurence Olivier, director and producer of 1948's Hamlet, the inaugural recipient.
- Awarded for: Best film in English from outside of the United States
- Location: United States
- Presented by: Hollywood Foreign Press Association
- Website: goldenglobes.com

The Golden Globe Award for Best English-Language Foreign Film was a Golden Globe Award created in 1948 and discontinued after 1973.

The award was split from Best Foreign Film, which was dedicated to films not in the English language; as the organisation behind the Golden Globes, the Hollywood Foreign Press Association (Hollywood Foreign Correspondents Association when the award was first created) is based in the United States, the Best English-Language Foreign Film category was dedicated to films in English from any other country, whether they had English as an official language or not. As with other "Best Film" Golden Globe Awards, the film itself is considered the winner, with neither directors nor producers being the recipients.

Originally awarded once to 1948's Hamlet at the 6th Golden Globe Awards, the award was re-established in 1955 and awarded infrequently until the 30th Golden Globe Awards where it was won by 1972's Young Winston, after which it was discontinued. All of the winners have been British films, with the exception of 1967's The Fox, which was a Canadian production; the 1968 winner, Romeo and Juliet, was a co-production between the United Kingdom and Italy.

The Award is mostly remembered on the jubilee anniversary celebrations of when the awarded films were released. It is also invariably mentioned prominently in the obituaries of a producer, a director, or an actor who was associated with the film.

== Winners ==
- 1948 – Hamlet
- 1955 – Richard III
- 1957 – Woman in a Dressing Gown
- 1958 – A Night to Remember
- 1960 – The Trials of Oscar Wilde
- 1964 – Girl with Green Eyes
- 1965 – Darling
- 1966 – Alfie
- 1967 – The Fox
- 1968 – Romeo and Juliet
- 1969 – Oh! What a Lovely War

=== 1970s ===
Year	English title	Original title	Country	Director
1970	Women in Love		United Kingdom	Ken Russell
1970	Act of the Heart		Canada	Paul Almond
1970	Bloomfield		United Kingdom	Richard Harris Uri Zohar
1970	The Virgin and the Gypsy		United Kingdom	Christopher Miles
1970	The Walking Major	Aru heishi no kake	Japan	Keith Larsen Koji Senno Nobuaki Shirai
1971	Sunday Bloody Sunday		United Kingdom	John Schlesinger
1971	The African Elephant		United Kingdom	Simon Trevor
1971	Friends		United Kingdom	Lewis Gilbert
1971	The Go-Between		United Kingdom	Joseph Losey
1971	The Raging Moon		United Kingdom	Bryan Forbes
1971	The Red Tent	La tenda rossa	Italy	Mikhail Kalatozov
1972	Young Winston		United Kingdom	Richard Attenborough
1972	Images		United Kingdom	Robert Altman
1972	Living Free		United Kingdom	Jack Couffer
1972	The Ruling Class		United Kingdom	Peter Medak
1972	Zee and Co.		United Kingdom	Brian Hutton

== Bibliography ==
- Harper, Sue; Porter, Vincent (2003). British Cinema of the 1950s: The Decline of Deference. Oxford University Press. ISBN 9780198159346.
