= 1948 Academy Awards =

1948 Academy Awards may refer to:

- 20th Academy Awards, the Academy Awards ceremony that took place in 1948
- 21st Academy Awards, the 1949 ceremony honoring the best in film for 1948
