= 1949 Academy Awards =

1949 Academy Awards may refer to:

- 21st Academy Awards, the Academy Awards ceremony that took place in 1949
- 22nd Academy Awards, the 1950 ceremony honoring the best in film for 1949
