= Carnival Lady =

1933 film

- Directed by: Howard Higgin
- Written by: Harold Tarshis; Wellyn Totman
- Produced by: Ken Goldsmith
- Starring: Boots Mallory; Allen Vincent; Donald Kerr
- Cinematography: Edward A. Kull
- Edited by: Louis Sackin
- Production company: Goldsmith Productions
- Distributed by: William Steiner Distribution
- Release date: November 11, 1933
- Running time: 64 minutes
- Country: United States
- Language: English

Carnival Lady is a 1933 American drama film directed by Howard Higgin and starring Boots Mallory, Allen Vincent and Donald Kerr.

The film's sets were designed by the art director Lewis J. Rachmil.

== Cast ==
- Boots Mallory as Penny Lee
- Allen Vincent as Tom Warren
- Donald Kerr as Dick
- Rollo Lloyd as Harry
- Jason Robards Sr. as Jim Ryan
- Gertrude Astor as Zandra, Fortune Teller
- Anita Faye as Trixie
- Richard Hayes as P.T. 'Porky' Owens
- Earl McDonald as Carl
- Kit Guard as Gorilla Watson
- Angelo Rossitto as Dwarf (uncredited)

== Bibliography ==
- Michael R. Pitts. Poverty Row Studios, 1929–1940: An Illustrated History of 55 Independent Film Companies, with a Filmography for Each. McFarland & Company, 2005.
