= 1948 New York Film Critics Circle Awards =

14th New York Film Critics Circle Awards

14th New York Film Critics Circle Awards

January 21, 1949
(announced December 28, 1948)

The Treasure
of the Sierra Madre

The 14th New York Film Critics Circle Awards, honored the best filmmaking of 1948.

== Winners ==
- Best Film:
  - The Treasure of the Sierra Madre
- Best Actor:
  - Laurence Olivier - Hamlet
- Best Actress:
  - Olivia de Havilland - The Snake Pit
- Best Director:
  - John Huston - The Treasure of the Sierra Madre
- Best Foreign Language Film:
  - Paisan (Paisà) • Italy
