= I Have Lived =

1933 film

- Directed by: Richard Thorpe
- Written by: Winifred Dunn; Louis E. Heifetz
- Produced by: George R. Batcheller
- Starring: Alan Dinehart; Anita Page; Allen Vincent
- Cinematography: M.A. Anderson
- Production company: Chesterfield Pictures
- Distributed by: Chesterfield Pictures
- Release date: June 15, 1933
- Running time: 65 minutes
- Country: United States
- Language: English

I Have Lived is a 1933 American drama film directed by Richard Thorpe and starring Alan Dinehart, Anita Page and Allen Vincent.

== Plot ==
A playwright discovers an actress to star in his latest play, unaware of her secret background.

== Cast ==
- Alan Dinehart as Thomas Langley
- Anita Page as Jean St. Clair
- Allen Vincent as Warren White
- Gertrude Astor as Harriet Naisson
- Maude Truax as Mrs. Genevieve 'Mousie' Reynolds
- Matthew Betz as Blackie
- Eddie Boland as Sidney Cook
- Florence Dudley as First Actress
- Gladys Blake as Second Actress
- Dell Henderson as J.W.
- Harry C. Bradley as Small Town Man
- Edward Keane as Leading Man

== Bibliography ==
- Michael R. Pitts. Poverty Row Studios, 1929–1940: An Illustrated History of 55 Independent Film Companies, with a Filmography for Each. McFarland & Company, 2005.
