= 2nd British Academy Film Awards =

1949 film awards ceremony

- Date: 29 May 1949
- Site: Odeon Theatre, Leicester Square, London

Highlights
- Best Film: Hamlet
- Best British Film: The Fallen Idol
- Most awards: Hamlet, The Fallen Idol (1)
- Most nominations: Hamlet, The Fallen Idol (2)

The 2nd British Academy Film Awards, known retroactively as the British Academy Film Awards, were given by the British Academy of Film and Television Arts (BAFTA) (known then as the British Film Academy) on 29 May 1949 at the Odeon Leicester Square, and honoured the best films of 1948. The awards for 1947 were presented at the same ceremony.

As with the awards for films from 1947, films from 1948 were eligible for the categories Best Film from any Source, British or Foreign and Best British Picture; these were won by Hamlet and The Fallen Idol, respectively. Additionally three new award categories were created: Best Documentary Picture, a "Special Award for work lying outside the feature and documentary fields", and the "United Nations Award for the best documentary or feature film illustrating one of the basic principles of the United Nation's [sic] Charter".

At the event, the Academy of Motion Picture Arts and Sciences also presented awards to British filmmakers for their work on Hamlet and The Red Shoes, in categories that they had won at the 21st Academy Awards.

== Winners and nominees ==
British films The Fallen Idol and Hamlet received the awards for Best British Film and Best Film from any Source, respectively, and were additionally nominated in both categories; Louisiana Story received the award for Best Documentary; Atomic Physics received the Special Award for Film; and the United Nations Award was handed out to Atomic Physics, Hungry Minds and screenplay The Winslow Boy.

Winners are listed first and highlighted in boldface; the nominees are listed below alphabetically and not in boldface.

| Best British Picture | Best Film from any Source |
|---|---|
| **The Fallen Idol**; Hamlet; Oliver Twist; Once a Jolly Swagman; The Red Shoes; Scott of the Antarctic; The Small Voice | **Hamlet**; Crossfire; The Fallen Idol; Four Steps in the Clouds; Monsieur Vincent; The Naked City; Paisan |
| Best Documentary Picture | Special Award for Film |
| **Louisiana Story**; Farrebique; Is Everybody Listening?; Shadow of the Ruhr; Those Blasted Kids; Three Dawns to Sydney | **Atomic Physics**; Bear that Got a Peacock's Tail; The Cat Concerto (Note: The 2011 and 2023 versions of the BAFTA website list The Cat's Concerto [sic] as a nominee for the 1949 Special Award. However, in the 1949 event brochure that is displayed on the BAFTA website, it is not listed under "Films Nominated For Awards".); Divided World; Gandhi's Funeral (Paramount British Newsreel); Norman McLaren Abstract Reel; Rubens; Your Children's Sleep |

=== United Nations Award ===
The category is described as being for "the best film embodying one or more of the principles of the United Nations Charter in 1949". No winner was awarded. (Note: Some versions of the user interface on the BAFTA website represent this only by omitting a gold "winner" icon, but the 2023 version of BAFTA's website explicitly states "No winner awarded this year".)

- Atomic Physics
- Hungry Minds
- The Winslow Boy

== See also ==
- 6th Golden Globe Awards
- 21st Academy Awards
