= National Board of Review Awards 1948 =

Annual US film awards ceremony

20th National Board of Review Awards

December 21, 1948

The 20th National Board of Review Awards were announced on December 21, 1948.

== Top ten films ==
1. Paisan
2. Day of Wrath
3. The Search
4. The Treasure of the Sierra Madre
5. Louisiana Story
6. Hamlet
7. The Snake Pit
8. Johnny Belinda
9. Joan of Arc
10. The Red Shoes

== Winners ==
- Best Film: Paisan
- Best Actor: Walter Huston (The Treasure of the Sierra Madre)
- Best Actress: Olivia de Havilland (The Snake Pit)
- Best Director: Roberto Rossellini (Paisan)
- Best Screenplay: John Huston (The Treasure of the Sierra Madre)
