= Allen Vincent =

American actor and screenwriter (1903–1979)

- Born: Allen Leffingwell Vincent; August 28, 1903; Spokane, Washington, U.S.
- Died: November 30, 1979 (aged 76); Canoga Park, California, U.S.
- Occupations: Actor, screenwriter

Allen Leffingwell Vincent (August 28, 1903 – November 30, 1979) was an American actor and Academy Award-nominated screenwriter. He started as a stage actor in New York City before moving to acting in motion pictures in the late 1920s, then transitioning to screenwriting in the early 1940s. His last credit is as a co-screenwriter for the 1952 film The Girl in White, which starred June Allyson and Arthur Kennedy.

== Early years ==
Vincent was born in Spokane, Washington, the youngest of the two children of William David and Mary Eva (née Allen) Vincent. His father served as the president and vice chair of Spokane's Old National Bank and Union Trust Company and following the death of his first wife married Neen Hawley McVey in 1910. Vincent was raised in the Episcopal church, being baptized on November 1, 1903, and confirmed on March 17, 1918, in Spokane's former All Saints Episcopal Cathedral. From 1920 to 1923 Vincent was a student at Dartmouth College in Hanover, New Hampshire.

== Career ==
After leaving Dartmouth, Vincent started his career as a stage actor, with his first role in Vanity Fair with Doris Keane in New York City in 1921, followed by serving as an understudy to Noël Coward in The Vortex. His first credited film role came in 1929's Mother's Boy starring Morton Downey. He would appear in more than 25 films in the next decade, with his most notable role in 1933's Mystery of the Wax Museum, where he played lead actress Fay Wray's love interest. His last known acting appearance happened in 1939 in the noir film Missing Daughters.

Due to the development of a hearing impairment, starting in 1941, he transitioned to screenwriting and editing, his first credit being for The Face Behind the Mask, a noir crime film starring Peter Lorre about a fire-scarred watchmaker who turns to a life of crime to survive. The film initially had poor reviews, but since that time has received increasing praise from more contemporary critics like Leonard Maltin and Dennis Schwartz. His greatest success as screenwriter came with Johnny Belinda, the 1948 film starring Jane Wyman. The screenplay he wrote with Irma von Cube was nominated for a 1949 Academy Award, but lost to John Huston for The Treasure of the Sierra Madre.

== Death ==
Vincent died on November 30, 1979 at Canoga Terrace Convalescent Hospital in Canoga Park, California.

== Filmography ==
=== Acting ===
Year	Title	Role	Notes
1929	Mother's Boy	Dinslow	
1930	The Still Alarm		Short Film
1932	This Reckless Age	Phillip (Pig) Van Dyke	
1932	Street of Women	Clarke Upton	
1932	Thrill of Youth	Jack Thayer	
1932	Crooner	Ralph – Band Member	
1932	Two Against the World	Bob Hamilton	
1932	No More Orchids	Dick	
1933	Mystery of the Wax Museum	Ralph Burton	
1933	Broadway Bad	Bob North	
1933	Daring Daughters	Edgar Barrett	
1933	I Have Lived	Warren White	
1933	Carnival Lady	Tom Warren	
1934	Hi, Nellie!	Nick Grassi	
1934	Success at Any Price	Geoffrey Halliburton	
1935	Old Man Rhythm	College Boy	Uncredited
1935	The Return of Peter Grimm	Frederik	
1935	Bad Boy	Bob Carey	
1935	It's a Bet	Norman	
1936	Chatterbox	Mr. Harrison	
1936	Sutter's Gold	Juan Bautista Alvarado Jr.	
1936	Easy Money	Eddie Adams	
1937	A Family Affair	William Booth "Bill" Martin	
1938	Ladies in Distress	Spade	
1938	Army Girl	Capt. Bradley	
1939	Missing Daughters	Slinky	Uncredited

=== Screenwriting ===
- The Face Behind the Mask (1941)
- Song of Love (1947)
- Johnny Belinda (1948)
- The Schumann Story (1950)
- The Girl in White (1952)
