= Hamlet (1948 film) =

1948 film by Laurence Olivier

- Theatrical release poster
- Directed by: Laurence Olivier
- Screenplay by: Laurence Olivier (uncredited)
- Based on: Hamlet; 1599 play by William Shakespeare
- Produced by: Laurence Olivier
- Starring: Laurence Olivier
- Cinematography: Desmond Dickinson
- Edited by: Helga Cranston
- Music by: William Walton
- Production company: Two Cities
- Distributed by: Rank Film Distributors Ltd.
- Release date: 4 May 1948
- Running time: 155 minutes
- Country: United Kingdom
- Language: English
- Budget: £527,530
- Box office: $3,250,000 (US rentals) or £1,352,200

Hamlet is a 1948 British film adaptation of the play of the same name by William Shakespeare. It was adapted, directed by and stars Laurence Olivier and was his second film as director, as well as the second of the three Shakespeare films he directed (the 1936 As You Like It had starred Olivier, but had been directed by Paul Czinner).

Hamlet was the first British film to win the Academy Award for Best Picture. It is also the first sound film of the play in English. Olivier's Hamlet is the Shakespeare film that has received the most prestigious accolades, winning Academy Awards for Best Picture and Best Actor (for Olivier) and the Golden Lion at the 9th Venice International Film Festival. However, it proved controversial among Shakespearean purists, who felt that Olivier had made too many alterations and excisions to the four-hour play by cutting one-and-a-half-hours' worth of content. Milton Shulman wrote in The Evening Standard: "To some it will be one of the greatest films ever made, to others a deep disappointment. Laurence Olivier leaves no doubt that he is one of our greatest living actors... his liberties with the text, however, are sure to disturb many."

== Plot ==
On the battlements of Elsinore, in a flash-forward, the dead body of Hamlet is borne in state upon the shoulders of noble lords with Horatio in attendance mourning the dead Hamlet. The flash-forward dissolves and in the same location at a separate time, Francisco, a sentry, is relieved of his watch by another sentry, Bernardo, who, with yet another sentry, Marcellus, has twice previously seen the Ghost of King Hamlet. Marcellus then arrives with the sceptical Horatio, Prince Hamlet's friend. Suddenly, all three see the Ghost, and Horatio demands that the Ghost speak. The Ghost vanishes then, without a word.

Inside the Great Hall of the castle, the court is celebrating the marriage of Gertrude and King Claudius; old King Hamlet has died apparently of an accidental snakebite, and his wife, Gertrude, has, within a month of the tragedy, married the late King's brother. Prince Hamlet sits alone, refusing to join in the celebration, despite the protests of the new King. When the court has left the Great Hall, Hamlet fumes over the hasty marriage, muttering to himself the words "and yet, within a month!"

Soon, Horatio and the sentries enter telling Hamlet of the ghostly apparition of his father. Hamlet proceeds to investigate, and upon arriving on the battlements, sees the Ghost. Noting that the Ghost beckons him forward, Hamlet follows it up onto a tower, wherein it reveals its identity as the Ghost of Hamlet's father. He tells Hamlet that he was murdered, who did it, and how it was done. Claudius poured poison into the late King Hamlet's ear, thereby killing him. Hamlet does not at first accept this as the truth, and then prepares to feign madness, so as to test Claudius' conscience, without jumping to conclusions.

This feigned insanity attracts the attention of Polonius who is completely convinced that Hamlet has gone mad. Polonius pushes this point with the King, claiming that it is derived from Hamlet's love for Ophelia, Polonius's daughter. Claudius, however, is not fully convinced, and has Polonius set up a meeting between Hamlet and Ophelia. Hamlet's "madness" is constant even in this exchange, and Claudius is convinced.

Hamlet then hires a group of wandering stage performers, requesting that they enact the play The Murder of Gonzago for the king. However, Hamlet makes a few alterations to the play, so as to make it mirror the circumstances of the late King's murder. Claudius, unable to endure the play, calls out for light, and retires to his room. Hamlet is now convinced of Claudius' treachery. He finds Claudius alone, and has ample opportunity to kill the villain. However, at this time, Claudius is praying, and Hamlet does not seek to send him to heaven, so, he waits, and bides his time.

He instead confronts Gertrude about the matter of his father's death and Claudius' treachery. During this confrontation, he hears a voice from the arras, and, believing that it was Claudius eavesdropping, plunges his dagger into the curtains. On discovering that he has in fact, killed the eavesdropping Polonius instead, Hamlet is only mildly upset, and he continues to confront his mother. He then sees the ghostly apparition of his father, and proceeds to converse with it. Gertrude, who cannot see the Ghost, becomes convinced that Hamlet is mad.

Hamlet is deported to England by Claudius, who has given orders for him to be killed once he reaches there. Fortunately, Hamlet's ship is attacked by pirates, and he is returned to Denmark. In his absence, however, Ophelia goes mad over Hamlet's rejection and the idea that her own sweetheart has killed her father, and she drowns, supposedly committing suicide. Laertes, Ophelia's brother, is driven to avenge her death, as well as his father's.

Claudius and Laertes learn of Hamlet's return and prepare to have him killed. However, they plan to make it look like an accident. Claudius orders Laertes to challenge Hamlet to a duel, wherein Laertes will be given a poisoned blade that will kill with a bare touch. In case Laertes is unable to hit Hamlet, Claudius also prepares a poisoned drink.

Hamlet meets Laertes' challenge and engages him in a duel. Hamlet wins the first two rounds, and Gertrude drinks from the cup, unaware that it is poisoned. Whilst in-between bouts, Laertes rushes Hamlet and strikes him on the arm, fatally poisoning him. Hamlet, not knowing this, continues to duel. Hamlet eventually disarms Laertes and switches blades with him. Hamlet then strikes Laertes in the wrist, fatally wounding him. Gertrude then submits to the poison and dies, warning Hamlet not to drink from the cup.

Laertes, dying, confesses the whole plot to Hamlet, who flies at Claudius in a fit of rage, fatally stabbing and slashing him, then dies himself. Horatio, horrified by all this, orders that Hamlet be given a decent funeral, and the young prince's body is taken away while the Danish court kneels and the cannons of Elsinore fire off a peal of ordnance in respect.

== Cast ==
=== The Royal Court of Denmark ===
- Basil Sydney as King Claudius. Claudius is the brother, and murderer, of the late King Hamlet, and he marries his brother's widow only two months after the King's death. An English actor, Sydney had a long and prolific career on both stage and screen. In 1923, at the age of 29, he played Hamlet in a modern-dress stage production. He subsequently appeared with Olivier in The Devil's Disciple.
- Eileen Herlie as Queen Gertrude. Gertrude, now married to Claudius, does not suspect foul play, and she fears for the sanity of her son. A Scottish-American actress, Herlie was born in Scotland and worked in the UK on film and stage productions until the mid-1950s, when she moved permanently to the U.S., where she worked mainly on stage and TV. (Her role as Gertrude was secured by arrangement with Sir Alexander Korda, to whom she was under contract.) She had previously played Gertrude on stage in 1945 to the Hamlet of Peter Glenville. She would repeat the part in the 1964 Broadway production starring Richard Burton as Hamlet.
- Laurence Olivier as Prince Hamlet. Hamlet is the conflicted son of the late King, who is now suspicious of his father's death. Olivier, considered by many to be the greatest actor of the 20th century, had played this role twice on stage in 1937, at The Old Vic theatre and later at Elsinore Castle, the actual setting of the play. His 1948 film performance of the role was the only one of his to win him an Academy Award for Best Actor, despite three prior nominations, and five subsequent ones. Olivier, however, did receive several Honorary Oscars, the first in 1947 for Henry V.
- Norman Wooland as Horatio, his friend. Horatio is Hamlet's level-headed fellow student from the University of Wittenberg. Wooland was an English actor, born in Germany, who subsequently had a long career in British and international films. He later played another companion to Olivier's character in Richard III.
- Felix Aylmer as Polonius, Lord Chamberlain. Polonius is suspicious of Hamlet, and he is convinced that Hamlet's supposed insanity stems from the young prince's love for his daughter, Ophelia. Aylmer was an actor and author who had a long career on stage and screen. He was a long-serving President of the actors' union Equity and a champion of screen acting, which he felt was undervalued. He had previously worked with Olivier on his Henry V as well as on As You Like It, which starred Olivier.
- Terence Morgan as Laertes, his Son. Laertes arrives in Denmark to discover his father killed by Hamlet, and Ophelia, his sister, first driven mad and then to her own death. He vows vengeance against Hamlet. Morgan was an English actor, who was discovered by Olivier in 1945 at the age of 23 and joined The Old Vic company in 1948. He had a prolific career as one of the most highly-paid stars of British films throughout the 1950s.
- Jean Simmons as Ophelia. Ophelia is driven mad by her father Polonius' death, as well as by Hamlet's rejection. Simmons' performance in this film earned her a nomination for Best Supporting Actress at the 1949 Oscars. An English actress, she had a subsequent career as a major Hollywood star. She appeared with Olivier again in Spartacus.
- King Hamlet. Hamlet's father, Claudius' older brother, and Gertrude's first husband, who appears in Shakespeare's play as the Ghost of Hamlet's Father. This character has no screen credit. The part was played- and voiced – by Laurence Olivier himself. Olivier is recognisable as the king in the flashback sequence showing the sleeping King Hamlet being poisoned by his brother Claudius. Where Hamlet and the Ghost appear together in the same shot an unidentified stand-in plays the Ghost.

=== Men at Arms ===
- John Laurie as Francisco. Francisco is a weary sentry, who is relieved by Bernardo at the beginning of the film. A Scottish actor, Laurie appeared in all three Olivier-directed Shakespeare films, as well as the 1936 film As You Like It, which starred Olivier.
- Esmond Knight as Bernardo [sometimes spelled Barnardo]. Bernardo is a sentry who is sent to relieve Francisco and sees the apparition of King Hamlet. He and Marcellus have seen it twice before, but they've found it difficult to convince Horatio until he sees it himself. A Welsh actor, Knight appeared in all three of Olivier's Shakespeare films, as well as Olivier's The Prince and the Showgirl.
- Anthony Quayle as Marcellus. Marcellus is another sentry. He and Bernardo have already seen the Ghost twice before and see it again. (Quayle is replaced in certain shots by another, uncredited, performer.) An English actor and stage director, Quayle spent several years as artistic director of the Shakespeare Memorial Theatre in Stratford-upon-Avon. He became a star of British cinema from the mid-1950s to the mid-1960s.

[All of the above characters reappear at the end of the film, where they are three of the 'four captains' who 'bear Hamlet's body, like a soldier, to the stage'. They are accompanied by a fourth, unidentified, soldier and by Horatio.]

- Niall MacGinnis as Sea Captain. The 'Sea Captain' (a character invented for the film) is the captain of the pirate ship on which Hamlet is stranded after he sets out for England. The captain's lines, though, are from the original play, where they are spoken by a sailor. An Irish actor with a long career in British and international films, MacGinnis had previously appeared in Olivier's Henry V.
- Christopher Lee, an English actor who later became famous as a star of Hammer horror films, has an uncredited role as a guard with no spoken lines.

=== The Play within the Play ===
- Harcourt Williams as First Player. The First Player is enlisted by Hamlet to alter the company's play to mirror Hamlet's suspicions about Claudius. An English actor and stage director, Williams had previously appeared in Olivier's Henry V.
- Patrick Troughton as Player King. The Player King enacts a mimed role that echoes Claudius' treachery. An English actor, best known for his role as the second incarnation of the Doctor in Doctor Who, he subsequently appeared in Olivier's Richard III.
- Tony Tarver as Player Queen. The Player Queen is the Player King's wife. In Olivier's film she is a satire of Gertrude, intended to catch the conscience of Claudius. Tarver seems to have made no other film appearances.

=== Servants to the Court ===
- Peter Cushing as Osric. Osric is a foppish courtier who referees the duel between Hamlet and Laertes. (In later film versions of the play, such as the 1969 one with Nicol Williamson, Osric would be made more openly 'swishy'.) An English actor, Cushing joined the Old Vic company in 1948, and he later became famous as a star of Hammer horror films and Star Wars (1977).
- Stanley Holloway as Gravedigger. (The Second Gravedigger of the play is omitted.) The Gravedigger is digging Ophelia's grave when Hamlet and Horatio come across him. An English actor, Holloway replaced Irish actor F. J. McCormick, who died prematurely before he could film his scenes.
- Russell Thorndike as Priest. The Priest leads the funeral service for Ophelia. An English actor and novelist (the Doctor Syn series) and younger brother of Sybil Thorndike, he appeared in all three of Olivier's Shakespeare films.

== Production ==
=== Casting and filming ===
Eileen Herlie, who plays Hamlet's mother, was 29 years old when the movie was filmed in 1947. Olivier, who plays her son, was 40.

Olivier played the voice of the Ghost by recording the dialogue as an amplified whisper and playing it back at a reduced speed, giving it a deep, haunting otherworldly quality. However, for many years it was falsely assumed, even in film reference books, that John Gielgud had recorded the voice of the Ghost. (Gielgud played the role of the Ghost in three later productions – the 1964 stage, Electronovision and LP Album versions of Richard Burton's Hamlet, the 1970 telecast of the Hallmark Hall of Fame production starring Richard Chamberlain, and a 1992 BBC radio production starring Kenneth Branagh.)

Felix Barker, Olivier's first biographer, described how the actor-director created the sound effects for the three appearances of the Ghost:

To produce the eerie noise which preceded the appearance of the Ghost Olivier...went to enormous trouble. He made as many as fourteen separate sound tracks. On one he had recorded fifty women shrieking; on another the groans of as many men; a third consisted of a dozen violinists scraping their bows across the strings on a single screeching note. These various tracks had then to be blended in different volumes and intensity until they produced a noise which seemed to him to resemble – on what authority is uncertain – 'the lid of hell being opened'. Supernatural horror was further increased by the pulsing heart-beat which heralded its every entrance. This sound, Olivier remembered, had been used by Jean-Louis Barrault in a stage production in Paris; he made it doubly effective on the screen by bringing the camera in and out of focus to synchronize with the pulsing. Before he would use it, however, he wrote to ask Barrault's permission and insisted on paying for the idea. Because no copyright is possible Olivier is particularly scrupulous about borrowing other people's production tricks or another actor's ideas.

=== Cinematography ===
The cinematography by Desmond Dickinson makes use of the deep focus photography previously popularised in films directed by William Wyler and Orson Welles.

=== Music ===
The music was composed by William Walton and, alongside his score for Olivier's 1944 film Henry V, has become his most celebrated film work.

== Reception ==
=== Box office ===
The film was popular at the British box office.

Producer's receipts were £187,900 in the UK and £1,164,400 overseas. It made a reported profit of £779,700.

=== Critical reception ===
The film's opening with Olivier's voiceover of his own interpretation of the play, was criticised as reductive: "This is the tragedy of a man who could not make up his mind."

Olivier excised the "political" elements of the play (entirely cutting Fortinbras, Rosencrantz and Guildenstern) in favour of an intensely psychological performance, partly to save time. Olivier stated that "one great whacking cut had to be made", and the cut he chose to make was the omission of Rosencrantz and Guildenstern. This was not much criticised at first, but later critics did take more notice of it, especially after shorter productions of Hamlet that did not leave out these characters were presented on television. John Gielgud took much the same approach years later by leaving out Rosencrantz, Guildenstern, and Fortinbras from his 1951 radio production of the play, broadcast on the program Theatre Guild on the Air. Gielgud also followed the lead of Olivier's film version by giving the final lines of the play to Horatio instead of Fortinbras.

Olivier heightened the Oedipal overtones of the play by having Hamlet kiss his mother lovingly on the lips several times during the film. Film scholar Jack Jorgens has commented that "Hamlet's scenes with the Queen in her low-cut gowns are virtually love scenes." In contrast, Jean Simmons' Ophelia is destroyed by Hamlet's treatment of her in the nunnery scene.

According to J. Lawrence Guntner, the style of the film owes much to German Expressionism and to film noir: The cavernous sets featuring narrow winding stairwells correspond to the labyrinths of Hamlet's psyche. In Time in 1948, critic James Agee praised the film, "It can be said of Olivier's version — purely for the sake of argument — that it contains no single unquestionably great performance, but a complete roll call of fine ones: that it is worked out with intelligence, sensitivity, thoroughness and beauty; that it has everything which high ambition, deep sobriety and exquisite skill can give it ... In its subtlety, variety, vividness and control, Olivier's performance is one of the most beautiful ever put on film." British critic Leslie Halliwell was less enthusiastic, "Olivier's central performance is, alas, one of his least interesting, and only people unfamiliar with Shakespeare could have given him an award for it. He is too old, too stiff, too careful with his words to suggest either vacillation or hypocrisy. We don't feel that this Hamlet needs to be urged to make up his mind, rather that he will never do it under any circumstances. When he finally does stab the king, we receive it as an Olivier stage trick rather than a development of character."

On review aggregator Rotten Tomatoes, the film holds a score of 96% based on 49 reviews, with an average rating of 8.6/10. The website's critics consensus reads, "A well-executed labor of love from star and director Laurence Olivier, Hamlet not only proved that Shakespeare could be successfully adapted to the big screen, it paved the way for further cinematic interpretations."

=== Awards and honours ===
The film version of Hamlet was the only film in which the leading actor had directed himself to an Oscar-winning performance, until 1998, when Roberto Benigni directed himself to an Oscar win in Life Is Beautiful. Olivier is also the only actor to win an Oscar for a Shakespearean role. Hamlet was the only film to have won both the Golden Lion and the Academy Award for Best Picture until The Shape of Water in 2017, which was followed by Nomadland three years later. It is also the first non-American film to win the Best Picture Academy Award.

Award	Category	Recipient	Result	Ref.
Academy Awards	Best Picture	J. Arthur Rank-Two Cities Films	Won	
Academy Awards	Best Director	Laurence Olivier	Nominated	
Academy Awards	Best Actor	Laurence Olivier	Won	
Academy Awards	Best Supporting Actress	Jean Simmons	Nominated	
Academy Awards	Best Art Direction-Set Decoration – Black-and-White	Roger K. Furse and Carmen Dillon	Won	
Academy Awards	Best Costume Design – Black-and-White	Roger K. Furse	Won	
Academy Awards	Best Score of a Dramatic or Comedy Picture	William Walton	Nominated	
Bambi Awards	Best Actress – International	Jean Simmons (also for The Woman in the Hall)	Won	
Bodil Awards	Best European Film		Won	
British Academy Film Awards	Best British Picture		Nominated	
British Academy Film Awards	Best Film from any Source		Won	
Cinema Writers Circle Awards	Best Foreign Film		Won	
Golden Globe Awards	Best Foreign Film – English-Language		Won	
Golden Globe Awards	Best Actor in a Leading Role	Laurence Olivier	Won	
National Board of Review Awards	Top Ten Films		6th Place	
New York Film Critics Circle Awards	Best Film		Nominated	
New York Film Critics Circle Awards	Best Director	Laurence Olivier	Nominated	
New York Film Critics Circle Awards	Best Actor	Laurence Olivier	Won	
Picturegoer Awards	Best Actor	Laurence Olivier	Won	
Venice International Film Festival	Grand International Prize of Venice	Laurence Olivier	Won	
Venice International Film Festival	Best Actress	Jean Simmons	Won	
Venice International Film Festival	Best Cinematography	Desmond Dickinson	Won	

== Influence ==
In the past, the 1948 film was considered the definitive cinematic rendition of Hamlet. Over the years, however, it has lost some of its status, especially in competition with the unabridged 1996 adaptation, which many critics now consider superior, as well as the 1994 animated film The Lion King which was also based on Hamlet. The film has also been compared to Olivier's other Shakespearean adaptations, Henry V and Richard III. Some critics argue that Olivier overemphasised Hamlet's Oedipal fixation on his mother, and that due to the omission of Rosencrantz and Guildenstern, two of the more important supporting characters in the play, the film lacks some of the play's best comedic moments. The duo's inclusion in later adaptations, such as the 1969 Nicol Williamson – Tony Richardson Hamlet and the 1990 Mel Gibson/Franco Zeffirelli version, both of which are shorter than Olivier's, counters Olivier's rationale that the play needed such drastic cuts to work on screen. Kenneth Branagh's 1996 film version of the complete Hamlet included everything that Olivier had omitted. It is worth noting, however, that the parts of Rosencrantz and Guildenstern (and Osric) are reduced in the Richardson and Zeffirelli versions, and that Branagh's version is almost 90 minutes longer than Olivier's.

Noted film critic Pauline Kael asserted that

even if you feel that certain scenes should be done differently, when has the rest of the play been done so well? Whatever the omissions, the mutilations, the mistakes, this is very likely the most exciting and most alive production of Hamlet you will ever see on the screen. It's never dull, and if characters such as Fortinbras and Rosencrantz and Guildenstern have been sacrificed, it's remarkable how little they are missed.

James Agee in Time wrote in 1948: "A man who can do what Laurence Olivier is doing for Shakespeare is certainly among the more valuable men of his time."

== Television debut ==
Hamlet was the second of Olivier's Shakespeare films to be telecast on American television – the first was Richard III, which was given an afternoon rather than a prime-time showing by NBC on 11 March 1956, the same day that it premiered in cinemas in the U.S. ABC gave the Olivier Hamlet a prime time showing in December 1956, but like many theatrical films shown on television during that era, it was split into two 90-minute halves and telecast over a period of two weeks rather than being shown on one evening.

== Home media ==
In North America, Olivier's Hamlet has been released on DVD as part of The Criterion Collection, which has released his film versions of Henry V and Richard III on DVD. The film has been released on Blu-ray Disc in the UK; however this disc is Region B locked and will not work in most American players. The Criterion Collection later rereleased Henry V and Richard III on Blu-ray with more special features beyond the trailer and essay that the original DVDs featured, while The Criterion Collection has not regained the rights to release Hamlet on Blu-ray with better picture and audio quality along with any new special features that could accompany such a release.

== See also ==
- BFI Top 100 British films
