= Frederick Fox (designer) =

American designer (1910–1991)

Frederick Fox (July 10, 1910, New York City – September 11, 1991, Englewood, New Jersey) was an American designer for both stage and screen. He designed mainly sets but also lights and costumes on occasion for close to 100 productions staged on Broadway. He was also known for his interior designs of restaurants.

== Life and career ==
Born in New York City, Frederick Fox was educated at two boarding schools in his childhood: Storm King School and Phillips Exeter Academy; graduating from the latter institution in 1928. He then studied at Yale University where he graduated in 1932, and then at the National Academy of Design where he earned at artist diploma in 1933. He began his career as a set designer in summer stock theatre in Ivoryton, Connecticut in the 1930s prior to beginning a prolific career as a designer of mainly sets but also lights and costumes on Broadway.

Fox began his career on Broadway designing the sets for the 1937 play Farewell Summer. He worked as a designer for close to 100 stage works on Broadway; including Johnny Belinda (1940), Junior Miss (1941), The Doughgirls (1942), The Two Mrs. Carrolls (1943), Anna Lucasta (1944), Dear Ruth (1944), Make Mine Manhattan (1948), Light Up the Sky (1948), and The Seven Year Itch (1952) among many others. In 1951 he won a Donaldson Award for his sets for Darkness at Noon.

In addition to his work designing sets for the stage, Fox designed the interiors to several well known restaurants and consulted on designs used at the Honolulu International Airport and the Ted Stevens Anchorage International Airport. On television he was the art director for Max Liebman Spectaculars (1954), Satins and Spurs (1954), the 1954 live televised broadcast of Lady in the Dark, and the 1955 television special Babes in Toyland starring Barbara Cook. He also designed sets for Admiral Broadway Revue (1949) and Your Show of Shows (1950–1956).

Fox died at the age 81 in Englewood, New Jersey.
