= The Face Behind the Mask (1941 film) =

American film noir crime by Robert Florey

- Theatrical release poster
- Directed by: Robert Florey
- Screenplay by: Allen Vincent; Paul Jarrico
- Story by: Arthur Levinson
- Based on: Interim radio play by Thomas Edward O'Connell
- Produced by: Irving Briskin
- Starring: Peter Lorre; Evelyn Keyes; Don Beddoe
- Cinematography: Franz Planer
- Edited by: Charles Nelson
- Music by: Morris Stoloff
- Color process: Black and white
- Production company: Columbia Pictures
- Distributed by: Columbia Pictures
- Release date: January 16, 1941
- Running time: 68 minutes
- Country: United States
- Language: English

The Face Behind the Mask is a 1941 American film noir directed by Robert Florey and starring Peter Lorre, Evelyn Keyes and Don Beddoe. The screenplay was adapted by Paul Jarrico, Arthur Levinson, and Allen Vincent from the play Interim, written by Thomas Edward O'Connell (1915–1961).

== Plot ==
Janos Szabo (Peter Lorre) is a hopeful new Hungarian immigrant who, on his first day in New York City, is trapped in a hotel fire that leaves his face hideously scarred. He is refused employment due to his appearance and, though possessing tremendous skill as a watchmaker, is unable to find any work.

In extreme poverty, and despite believing that dishonesty can never bring happiness, he resorts to safecracking to obtain food, medicine, and a warm bed for his only friend, Dinky (George E. Stone). Eventually, he becomes the leader of a gang of thieves and raises money to commission and wear a realistic latex mask of his own face.

Janos then falls in love with Helen (Evelyn Keyes), a blind woman who perceives only the good in him, and encourages him to leave his life of crime behind him. Unfortunately, his gang come to believe that he has betrayed them to the police, and attempt to kill him by a car bomb, an attempt on his life that he survives, but which kills Helen.

In retaliation, Janos disguises himself as the pilot of the private plane in which the gang plans to fly out of the country. He lands the plane in the Arizona desert and lets out the fuel, suicidally stranding both the gang and himself without food or water, dooming them all to a slow death. At the film's end, Janos's body and those of his enemies are discovered by the police.

Based on the radio play by Thomas Edward O'Connell, The Face Behind the Mask was not a film that Lorre held in high esteem. His co-star Don Beddoe, who plays the police officer who befriends Janos in the film, once said, "I don't think Peter was very much impressed with The Face Behind the Mask. His other successes, such as M, made him pretty blasé about this particular venture."

== Cast ==
- Peter Lorre as Janos "Johnny" Szabo
- Evelyn Keyes as Helen Williams
- Don Beddoe as Lt. Jim O'Hara
- George E. Stone as Dinky
- John Tyrrell as Watts
- Stanley Brown as Harry
- Cy Schindell as Benson (as Al Seymour)
- James Seay as Jeff Jeffries
- Warren Ashe as Johnson, Reporter
- Charles C. Wilson as Chief O'Brien (as Charles Wilson)
- George McKay as Terry Finnegan

== Production ==
The Face Behind the Mask was directed by French-American director Robert Florey, and written by Paul Jarrico, and Allen Vincent. The film is based on the radio play The Interim by Thomas Edward O'Connell. Florey previously made contributions to Universal Pictures' 1931 film Frankenstein before James Whale was brought on as director, and he had directed Murders in the Rue Morgue. The film's script was specifically written with Peter Lorre in mind for the film's lead role, with parallels to Lorre's own life, as co-writer Jarrico recalled "The script was 'tailored', as I recall, in a sense Lorre had already been cast." Lorre was cast in the film's lead role of Janos "Johnny" Szabo as the first of a two-picture deal that he was contracted to make for Columbia Pictures. Evelyn Keyes, who had played Suellen O'Hara in Victor Fleming's Gone with the Wind, was cast as Janos' love interest Helen Williams. Actors Don Beddoe, George E. Stone, John Tyrrell, and Cy Schindell were cast in secondary roles for the film. Tyrell and Schindell were both regulars at Columbia Pictures and were well known for starring in the studio's Three Stooges short films.

Principal photography began on November 6, 1940, lasting for 20 days.

== Release ==
=== Theatrical release ===
The Face Behind the Mask premiered on January 16, 1941, in the United States before going into general release nationwide. It opened in London on May 26, 1941, followed by a release in Mexico on July 4, 1941, and in Montreal, Canada on October 4, 1941. In occupied France, the film was screened in the Free Zone on October 16, 1942, and it later reached Austrian audiences on January 1, 1946. The film had its German television premiere on September 27, 1977.

By 1958, the movie was included in Columbia Pictures’ Son of Shock television package, which circulated the film alongside other horror and crime titles from the studio's library. While it remained largely unavailable on home video for many years, the film received a region-free Blu-ray release in mid-2021 through Imprint Records (Viavision). This edition included special features such as an audio commentary by film historian Alan K. Rode, offering contemporary audiences insight into Peter Lorre's performance and the film's production.

== Reception ==
The Face Behind the Mask was poorly received during its initial release. In its 1941 review of the film, The New York Times was critical of the film, writing "Despite a certain pretentiousness toward things psychological, The Face Behind the Mask may safely be set down as just another bald melodramatic exercise in which the talents of Peter Lorre again are stymied by hackneyed dialogue and conventional plot manipulations."

Later reviews of the film have been more positive. Blockbuster Inc.'s Guide to Movies and Videos rated the film three out of four stars, praising the film's direction, premise, and performances. Leonard Maltin awarded the film three out of a possible four stars, calling the film "Extremely well done on slim budget". Dennis Schwartz from Ozus' World Movie Reviews gave the film a "B+" on an A+ to F scale, calling it "a horror story in that it offers a vision of the American Dream turning ugly and wrong." TV Guide rated the film two out of four stars, calling it "A stylish film about human suffering".

== Sources ==
=== Books ===
- Anon. (September 1, 1994). Blockbuster Video guide to movies and videos, 1995. Dell Publishing. ISBN 978-0-440-21766-4.
- Ascheid, Antje; Baer, Hester; Guenther-Pal, Alison (2003). Light Motives: German Popular Film in Perspective. Wayne State University Press. ISBN 0-8143-3045-2.
- Johnson, Tom (July 5, 2006). Censored Screams: The British Ban on Hollywood Horror in the Thirties. McFarland. ISBN 978-0-7864-2731-4.
- Maltin, Leonard; Green, Spencer; Edelman, Rob (January 2010). Leonard Maltin's Classic Movie Guide. Plume. ISBN 978-0-452-29577-3.
- Gregory William Mank (March 8, 2010). Bela Lugosi and Boris Karloff: The Expanded Story of a Haunting Collaboration, with a Complete Filmography of Their Films Together. McFarland. ISBN 978-0-7864-5472-3.
- Pitts, Michael (January 10, 2014). Columbia Pictures Horror, Science Fiction and Fantasy Films, 1928-1982. McFarland. ISBN 978-0-7864-5766-3.
- Seely, Peter; Pieper, Gail (April 27, 2007). Stoogeology: Essays on the Three Stooges. McFarland. ISBN 978-0-7864-2920-2.
- Thomson, David (May 6, 2014). The New Biographical Dictionary of Film: Sixth Edition. Knopf Doubleday Publishing Group. ISBN 978-1-101-87470-7.
- Youngkin, Stephen (September 30, 2005). The Lost One: A Life of Peter Lorre. University Press of Kentucky. ISBN 0-8131-2360-7.

=== Newspapers ===
- Thomas, Bob (July 12, 2008). "'Gone With the Wind' actress dies at 91". Intelligencer Journal. Lancaster, Pennsylvania. p. B3.

=== Websites ===
- "Catalog - The Face Behind the Mask". AFI.com. American Film Institute.
- T.M.P. (February 7, 1941). "At the Rialto". Associated Press. The New York Times.
- Schwartz, Dennis (February 4, 2008). "FACE BEHIND THE MASK, THE". DennisSchwartzReviews.com. Dennis Schwartz Reviews.
- "The Face Behind The Mask - Movie Reviews and Movie Ratings". TVGuide.com. TV Guide. Archived from the original on November 6, 2019.
