= Snow Capers =

1948 film by Arthur Cohen

Snow Capers is a 1948 short documentary film about winter sports in the Rocky Mountains directed by Arthur Cohen. It was nominated for an Oscar for Short Subjects, Two-Reel in the 21st Academy Awards.
