= Toward Independence =

1948 film

- Directed by: George L. George
- Production company: United States Army Signal Corps
- Distributed by: U.S Army
- Release date: 1948
- Running time: 30 minutes
- Country: United States
- Language: English

Toward Independence is a 1948 American short documentary film directed by George L. George, about the rehabilitation of veterans with spinal cord injuries.

== Accolades ==
In 1949, the film won an Oscar for Documentary Short Subject at 21st Academy Awards. Army Surgeon General Raymond W. Bliss received the award. The Academy Film Archive preserved Toward Independence in 2005.

== Sources ==
- Med_Corps, United States Army (1968). Army Medical Specialist Corps. Army Medical Specialist.
