= Johnny Belinda (1948 film) =

1948 American film

- Theatrical release poster
- Directed by: Jean Negulesco
- Screenplay by: Allen Vincent; Irma von Cube
- Based on: Johnny Belinda; 1940 play by Elmer Blaney Harris
- Produced by: Jerry Wald
- Starring: Jane Wyman; Lew Ayres; Charles Bickford; Agnes Moorehead; Stephen McNally
- Cinematography: Ted McCord
- Edited by: David Weisbart
- Music by: Max Steiner
- Distributed by: Warner Bros. Pictures
- Release date: September 14, 1948
- Running time: 102 minutes
- Country: United States
- Languages: English; American Sign
- Budget: $1,631,000
- Box office: $4.1 million (US/ Canada rentals) $6,987,000 (worldwide)

Johnny Belinda is a 1948 American drama film, directed by Jean Negulesco, based on the 1940 Broadway stage hit of the same name by Elmer Blaney Harris. The screenplay was written by Allen Vincent and Irma von Cube.

The story is based on an incident that occurred near Harris's summer residence in Fortune Bridge, Bay Fortune, Prince Edward Island. The title character is based on the real-life Lydia Dingwell (1852–1931), of Dingwells Mills, Prince Edward Island. The film dramatizes the consequences of spreading lies and rumors and the horror of rape; the latter subject had previously been prohibited by the Motion Picture Production Code. Johnny Belinda is widely considered to be the first Hollywood film for which the restriction was relaxed since its implementation in 1934, and as such was controversial at the time of its initial release.

The film stars Jane Wyman, Lew Ayres, Charles Bickford, Agnes Moorehead, Stephen McNally, and Jan Sterling. Wyman's performance earned her the Academy Award for Best Actress; she described it in 1968 as her "most creative" role and reported, "I studied for six months in a school for the deaf, and did the whole movie with my ears sealed in wax to blot out every noise but percussion sounds. I still remember the sign language."

It was filmed on location in Fort Bragg, California.

== Plot ==
Belinda MacDonald is a deaf-mute young woman living on Nova Scotia on the east coast of Canada. She is befriended by Dr. Robert Richardson, a physician who recently moved to town. The doctor realizes that, although she cannot hear or speak, Belinda is very intelligent. She lives on a farm with her father, Black MacDonald, and her aunt, Aggie MacDonald. The family raises cattle and sheep and makes a living grinding wheat into flour at their small mill. Her father and aunt call Belinda "Dummy" and resent her because her mother died giving birth to her. Dr. Richardson teaches Belinda American Sign Language, and she learns to read. Over time, his affection for her grows.

Dr. Richardson's secretary, Stella, is attracted to him, but the doctor does not reciprocate her feelings. After Stella figures out that he is attracted to Belinda, she starts to resent both of them.

One of the family's customers, Laughlin "Locky" McCormick, meets Belinda when he stops by the MacDonald farm. Locky is dating Stella at the time. He gets drunk, goes to the farm where Belinda is alone, and rapes her. This results in her pregnancy. Belinda gives birth to a boy, whom she names Johnny. The people in town shun the MacDonald family and Dr. Richardson, as they gossip that he must be Johnny's father. Dr. Richardson tells Black that he is willing to marry Belinda in order to quiet town gossip. Black rejects this idea, as he believes that Dr. Richardson does not truly love Belinda. Boycotted by locals, the doctor leaves the community and takes a position in a Toronto hospital. He writes to Belinda suggesting he will return for her and Johnny.

Locky goes to the MacDonald farm under the pretense of purchasing ground barley but really wants to get a look at baby Johnny. He boasts about the infant, saying, "spittin' image of his father," revealing to Black that he is the father of the child. Black follows Locky and threatens to expose him to the town. They have a fight on a seaside cliff, and Locky throws Black off the cliff into the sea, killing him. Town gossip calls it an accident and does not suspect Locky. They celebrate his wedding to Stella.

Belinda and her aunt Aggie try to operate the farm but struggle to pay the bills. Farmers boycott their flour mill. The town, at the urging of Locky, declares Belinda unfit to care for the child and awards him to Locky and Stella. They come to take Johnny. Belinda makes Stella realize that she is a smart and competent mother who will never give up her baby. Stella tells Locky that the mother should keep Johnny, but he demands the baby, telling his wife that it is his son. When he goes to retrieve the boy, Belinda kills him with a shotgun. She is arrested and goes on trial for murder. At the trial, Dr. Richardson testifies that she was protecting her property and family. The court dismisses this as the doctor's love for her and is ready to sentence Belinda to execution, but Stella blurts out that Locky had confessed the truth about the rape to her on the day he was killed. Belinda is set free, and she, Johnny, Dr. Richardson, and Aggie leave together.

== Main cast and characters ==
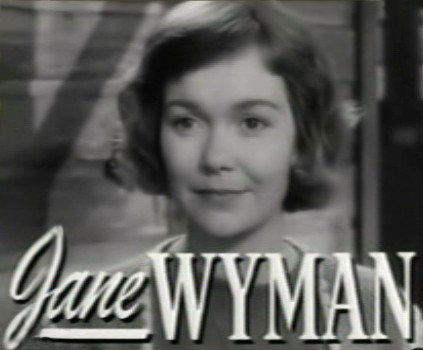
Jane Wyman
as Belinda MacDonald

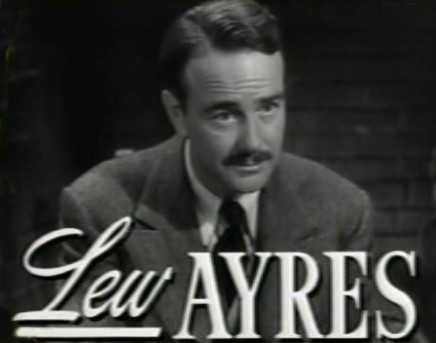
Lew Ayres
as Dr. Robert Richardson

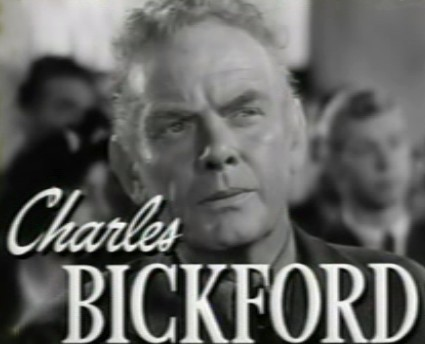
Charles Bickford
as Black MacDonald

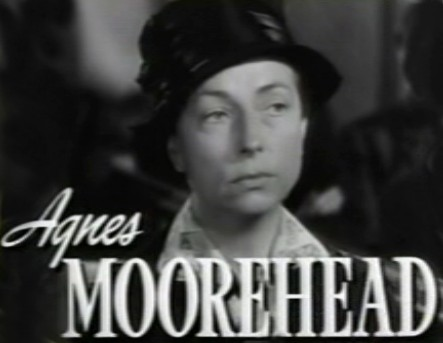
Agnes Moorehead
as Aggie MacDonald

== Other cast members ==
- Stephen McNally as Laughlin "Locky" McCormick
- Jan Sterling as Stella McCormick
- Rosalind Ivan as Mrs. Poggety
- Dan Seymour as Pacquet
- Mabel Paige as Mrs. Lutz
- Alan Napier as Defense Attorney
- Barbara Bates as Gracie Anderson
- Monte Blue as Ben
- James Craven as Interpreter
- Franklyn Farnum as Man on Jury
- Al Ferguson as Man Reciting Lord's Prayer
- Frank Hagney as Man Reciting Lord's Prayer
- Creighton Hale as Bailiff
- Jonathan Hale as Dr. Horace M. Gray
- Lew Harvey as Man Reciting Lord's Prayer
- Holmes Herbert as The Judge
- Douglas Kennedy as Mountie
- Colin Kenny as Man Reciting Lord's Prayer
- Snub Pollard as Man on Jury
- Richard Walsh as Fergus McQuiggen
- Ian Wolfe as Rector
- Ida Moore as Mrs. McKee
- Frederick Worlock as Prosecutor
- Charles Horvath as Church Attendant
- Blayney Lewis as Dan'l
- Alice MacKenzie as Farm Woman
- Larry McGrath as Man Reciting Lord's Prayer
- Ray Montgomery as Tim Moore
- Jeff Richards as Floyd McQuiggen
- Joan Winfield as Mrs. Tim Moore

== Reception ==
=== Box office ===
The film was a huge financial success, earning $4,266,000 domestically and $2,721,000 foreign.

The film was the second most popular movie at the British box office in 1948.

=== Critical reaction ===
Bosley Crowther of The New York Times wrote that while some of the scenes "were pretty lurid, especially towards the end," that "the best of the film is absorbing, and Miss Wyman, all the way through, plays her role in a manner which commands compassion and respect." William Brogdon of Variety called it "somber, tender, [and] moving," with Wyman's performance "a personal success." John McCarten of The New Yorker thought the screenplay was "far superior" to the script of the original play, and that the actors were "all convincing, particularly Jane Wyman, who is cast as the badgered heroine." The Monthly Film Bulletin called it "a memorable film in which Jane Wyman's performance as Belinda is outstanding." "A powerful dramatic entertainment," wrote Harrison's Reports. "The direction, acting, and photography are of a superior quality, but the outstanding thing about the picture is the exceptionally fine performance by Jane Wyman, an acting job that will undoubtedly make her a foremost contender for the Academy Award."

On review aggregator Rotten Tomatoes, 100% of critics have given the film a positive review based on 10 out of 11 surveyed critics giving the film a positive review.

=== Accolades ===
Award	Category	Recipient	Result
Academy Awards	Best Picture	Jerry Wald (for Warner Bros. Pictures)	Nominated
Academy Awards	Best Director	Jean Negulesco	Nominated
Academy Awards	Best Actor	Lew Ayres	Nominated
Academy Awards	Best Actress	Jane Wyman	Won
Academy Awards	Best Supporting Actor	Charles Bickford	Nominated
Academy Awards	Best Supporting Actress	Agnes Moorehead	Nominated
Academy Awards	Best Screenplay	Irma von Cube and Allen Vincent	Nominated
Academy Awards	Best Art Direction-Set Decoration – Black-and-White	Robert M. Haas and William O. Wallace	Nominated
Academy Awards	Best Cinematography – Black-and-White	Ted McCord	Nominated
Academy Awards	Best Film Editing	David Weisbart	Nominated
Academy Awards	Best Score of a Dramatic or Comedy Picture	Max Steiner	Nominated
Academy Awards	Best Sound Recording	Nathan Levinson	Nominated
Golden Globe Awards	Best Picture		Won (Note: Tied with The Treasure of the Sierra Madre.)
Golden Globe Awards	Best Actress in a Leading Role	Jane Wyman	Won
National Board of Review Awards	Top Ten Films		8th Place
Photoplay Awards	Gold Medal Actress	Jane Wyman	Won
Picturegoer Awards	Best Actress	Jane Wyman	Won
Venice International Film Festival	Golden Lion	Jean Negulesco	Nominated
Writers Guild of America Awards	Best Written American Drama	Irma von Cube and Allen Vincent	Nominated

The film is recognized by American Film Institute in these lists:

- 2005: AFI's 100 Years of Film Scores – Nominated

== Later versions ==
The film was remade first as a 1967 television movie starring Mia Farrow as Belinda, Ian Bannen as her doctor, and David Carradine as the rapist, and in 1982 as another TV remake with Rosanna Arquette as Belinda and Richard Thomas as the VISTA worker. Also, live versions aired on the US network NBC on October 13, 1958, as part of the Hallmark Hall of Fame series and on Australian television in 1959 as part of the Shell Presents series.

== See also ==
- List of films featuring the deaf and hard of hearing
