= Operation Vittles (film) =

1948 film

- Production company: United States Air Force
- Release date: 1948
- Country: United States
- Language: English

Operation Vittles is a 1948 American short documentary film about the Berlin Airlift. It was nominated for an Academy Award for Best Documentary Short. The film was preserved by the Academy Film Archive, in conjunction with the UCLA Film and Television Archive, in 2013.
