= 6th Golden Globe Awards =

Film award ceremony in 1949

- Date: March 16, 1949

Highlights
- Best Picture: Johnny Belinda; The Treasure of the Sierra Madre
- Most awards: The Treasure of the Sierra Madre; The Search (3)

The 6th Golden Globe Awards, honoring the best in film for 1948 films, were held on March 16, 1949.

== Winners ==
=== Best Picture (tie) ===
- Johnny Belinda directed by Jean Negulesco and The Treasure of the Sierra Madre directed by John Huston

=== Best Actor in a Leading Role ===
- Laurence Olivier – Hamlet

=== Best Actress in a Leading Role ===
- Jane Wyman – Johnny Belinda

=== Best Performance by an Actor in a Supporting Role in a Motion Picture ===
- Walter Huston – The Treasure of the Sierra Madre

=== Best Performance by an Actress in a Supporting Role in a Motion Picture ===
- Ellen Corby – I Remember Mama

=== Best Director – Motion Picture ===
- John Huston – The Treasure of the Sierra Madre

=== Best Screenplay – Motion Picture ===
- The Search written by Richard Schweizer

=== Best Music, Original Score – Motion Picture ===
- The Red Shoes composed by Brian Easdale

=== Cinematography ===
- La perla photographed by Gabriel Figueroa

=== Special Award – Best Juvenile Actor ===
- Ivan Jandl in The Search

=== Promoting International Understanding ===
- The Search directed by Fred Zinnemann

== See also ==
- Hollywood Foreign Press Association
- 2nd British Academy Film Awards
- 21st Academy Awards
- 1948 in film
