= The Treasure of the Sierra Madre (film) =

1948 film

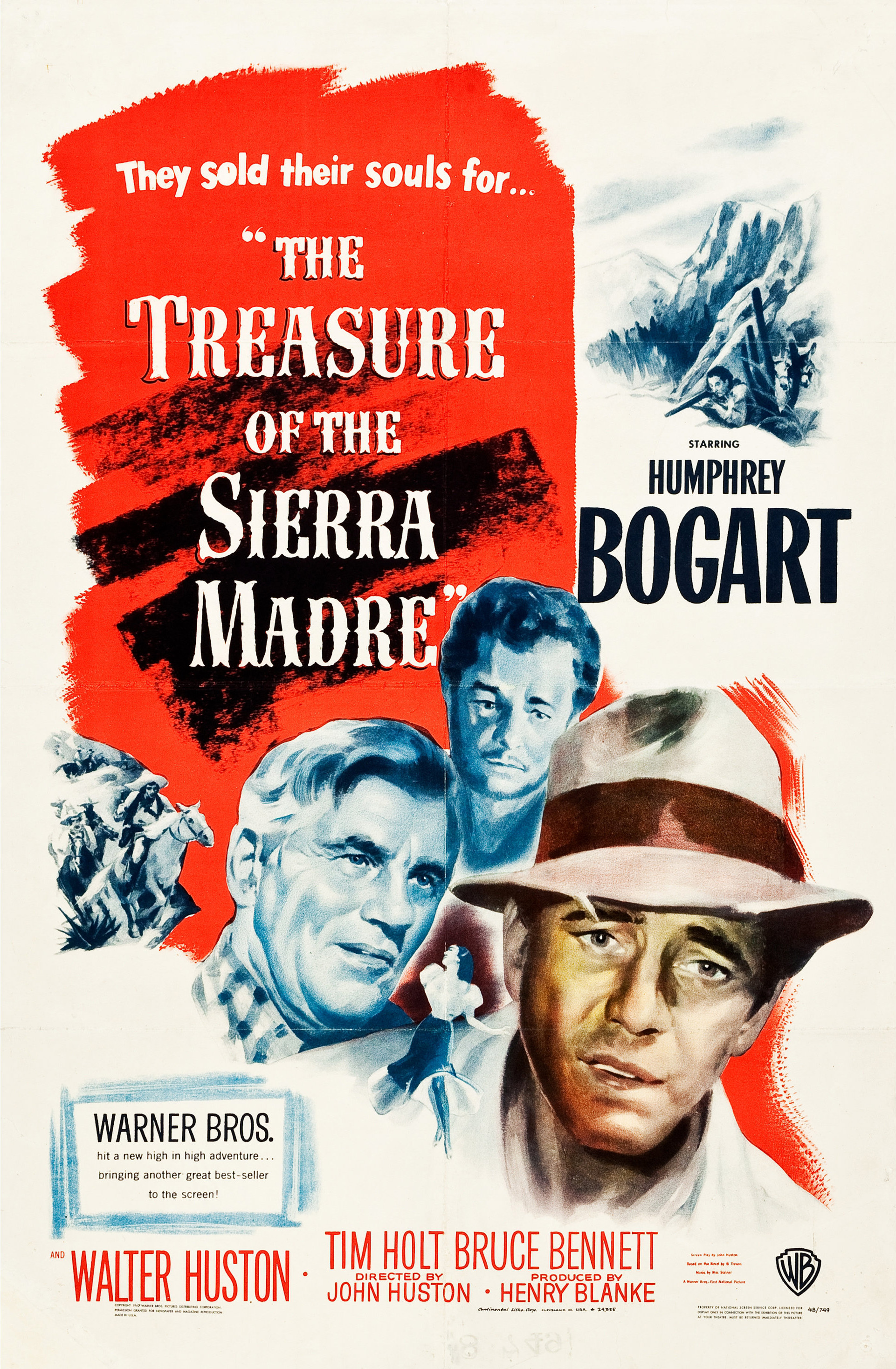
- Theatrical release poster
- Directed by: John Huston
- Screenplay by: John Huston
- Based on: The Treasure of the Sierra Madre; 1927 novel by B. Traven
- Produced by: Henry Blanke
- Starring: Humphrey Bogart; Walter Huston; Tim Holt; Bruce Bennett
- Cinematography: Ted D. McCord
- Edited by: Owen Marks
- Music by: Max Steiner
- Production company: Warner Bros.-First National
- Distributed by: Warner Bros. Pictures
- Release dates: January 14, 1948 (Los Angeles, California); January 15, 1948 (limited); January 24, 1948 (United States)
- Running time: 126 minutes
- Country: United States
- Language: English
- Budget: $2.5 million
- Box office: $4.1 million

The Treasure of the Sierra Madre is a 1948 American neo-western film written and directed by John Huston, and starring Humphrey Bogart, with Walter Huston, Tim Holt, and Bruce Bennett in supporting roles. Based on B. Traven's 1927 novel of the same name, the film follows two downtrodden men who join forces with a grizzled old prospector in searching for gold in Mexico.

John Huston developed an interest in adapting Traven's novel in 1935. Development of the film began in 1941, shortly after the release of The Maltese Falcon, but was delayed by American entry into World War II and Huston's Army service. The Treasure of the Sierra Madre was one of the early Hollywood productions to be shot on location outside the United States, with extensive location shooting in Mexico, as well as back in the United States.

Distributed by Warner Bros. Pictures, the film premiered in Los Angeles on 14 January 1948. It was both a critical and commercial success, winning three Academy Awards – Best Director and Best Screenplay for John Huston, and Best Supporting Actor for Walter Huston – the first time a father and son both won Oscars for the same film. It also won the BAFTA Award for Best Film and the Golden Globe Award for Best Picture.

The film continues to be highly regarded by critics and audiences, sometimes referred to as Huston's magnum opus and one of the greatest films of all time. In 1990, the film was selected for preservation in the United States National Film Registry by the Library of Congress as being "culturally, historically, or aesthetically significant".

== Plot ==
In 1925, in the Mexican town of Tampico, labor contractor Pat McCormick recruits Fred C. Dobbs and Bob Curtin, two broke American drifters, as roughnecks to help construct oil derricks for $8 per day (equivalent to $147 in 2025). When the project is completed and the men return to Tampico, McCormick skips out without paying them.

All but penniless, the pair encounter an old man named Howard in a flophouse. A loquacious ex-miner, he talks to them about gold prospecting and the perils of striking it rich. Dobbs and Curtin run into McCormick at a cantina and collect their back wages after a bar fight. When Dobbs hits a small jackpot in the lottery, he, Curtin and Howard have enough money to buy supplies to go prospecting in the interior.

Departing Tampico by train, the trio helps repulse a bandit attack led by their leader, Gold Hat. North of Durango, they head into the remote Sierra Madre mountains, where Howard proves to be the hardiest and most knowledgeable of them. After several days of arduous travel, he spots gold that the others had missed.

The men toil under harsh conditions, eventually amassing a fortune through placer mining. As the gold piles up, Dobbs becomes increasingly distrustful of the other two. The men agree to divide their diggings immediately and hide their shares.

On a supply trip to Durango, Curtin is spotted making purchases by a curious Texan named Cody. Cody trails Curtin back to the encampment. When he confronts the three men, they lie about what they are doing, but he is not fooled. He boldly proposes to join their outfit and share only in any future takings. Howard, Curtin and Dobbs discuss it and vote to kill him. Just as they announce their verdict, pistols in hand, Gold Hat and his bandits arrive, claiming to be federales. After a tense standoff, a gunfight ensues and Cody is killed. A troop of genuine federales suddenly appears and pursues Gold Hat and his gang. The three prospectors examine Cody's personal effects. A loving letter from his wife reveals that he was trying to provide for his family. Moved, Howard and Curtin agree to give part of their share to Cody's family, but Dobbs declines to follow suit.

Howard is called away to assist local indios with a seriously ill little boy. When the child recovers the next day the villagers insist that Howard return with them to be honored. Howard leaves his goods with Dobbs and Curtin and says he will meet them later. Dobbs and Curtin constantly argue until one night Dobbs shoots Curtin and takes all the gold. Curtin survives, crawling away and hiding during the night.

Finding Curtin gone, Dobbs flees but is ambushed at a waterhole by Gold Hat and his men and killed. The bandits mistake the bags of gold dust for sand and dump them, taking only the burros and supplies. A strong wind scatters the gold. Curtin is discovered by natives and taken to Howard's village, where he recovers.

Gold Hat's gang tries to sell the stolen burros in town, but a child recognizes the brands on them and reports them to the authorities. The bandits are captured and summarily executed by the Federales.

Howard and Curtin return to Durango in a dust storm hoping to reclaim their gold, only to find empty bags. At first shaken by the loss, they then grasp the immense irony of their circumstances, and burst into laughter. Howard decides to return to the village to accept an offer of a permanent home and a position of honor, and Curtin agrees to sell their recovered property and return to the U.S., where he will seek out Cody's widow.

== Cast ==
- Humphrey Bogart as Fred C. Dobbs
- Walter Huston as Howard
- Tim Holt as Bob Curtin
- Bruce Bennett as James Cody
- Barton MacLane as Pat McCormick
- Alfonso Bedoya as 'Gold Hat'
- Arturo Soto Rangel as 'El Presidente'
- Manuel Dondé as 'El Jefe'
- José Torvay as Pablo
- Margarito Luna as Pancho

Uncredited actors in minor roles include Robert Blake as a boy who sells a winning lottery ticket to Dobbs, Jack Holt (Tim's father) and Clifton Young as flophouse bums, Julian Rivero as a barber, Jay Silverheels as an Indio guide at the pier, and Pat Flaherty as a barfly. John Huston makes a cameo appearance, his first acting role in a film, as the white-clad American, whom Dobbs asks for money three times.

== Production ==
=== Development ===
Director John Huston first read the novel by B. Traven in 1935 and thought the material would make a great movie with his father in the main role. Based on a 19th-century ballad by a German poet, Traven's book reminded Huston of his adventures in the Mexican cavalry. After a smashing success with his directorial debut The Maltese Falcon, Huston started to work on the project. The studio had George Raft, Edward G. Robinson, and John Garfield in mind for the three main roles, but then World War II intervened. Vincent Sherman was set to direct a version of the story, with Robert Rossen as screenwriter, during the World War II years until his script fell afoul of the 1930 Motion Picture Production Code for being derogatory toward Mexicans.

=== Casting ===
By the time Huston came back from making several documentaries for the war effort, Humphrey Bogart had become Warner Brothers' biggest star. When Bogart first got wind that Huston might be making a film of the novel, he immediately started badgering Huston for a part. Bogart was given the main role of Fred C. Dobbs. Before filming, Bogart encountered a critic while leaving a New York nightclub. "Wait till you see me in my next picture", he said. "I play the worst shit you ever saw".

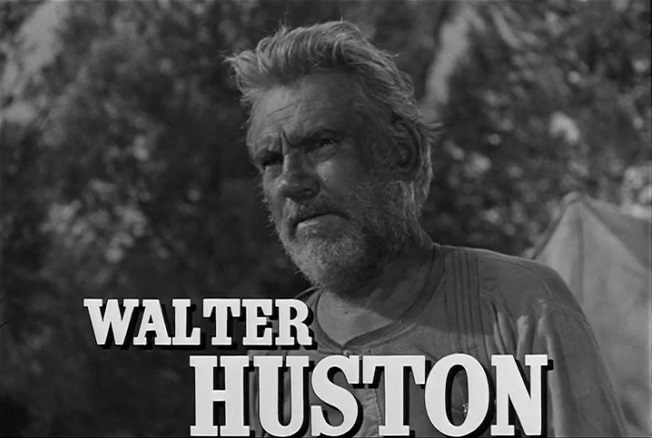
Walter Huston as Howard

Traven initially disagreed with Huston's decision to cast his father Walter Huston as Howard, preferring Lewis Stone, but eventually came to agree with Huston. Walter Huston also questioned his son's choice. He still saw himself as a leading man and was not keen on being cast in a supporting role. His son was able to persuade him to accept. John Huston rated his father's performance as the finest piece of acting in any of his films. On seeing Walter Huston's performance, Bogart famously said "One Huston is bad enough, but two are murder".

Huston originally wanted to cast Ronald Reagan as James Cody. Jack L. Warner instead insisted on casting Reagan in another film. Bruce Bennett was cast in the role. A few notable uncredited actors appear in the film:

- In an opening cameo, John Huston is pestered for money by Bogart's character. Robert Blake also appears as a young boy selling lottery tickets.
- A photograph included in the documentary accompanying the DVD release shows Ann Sheridan in streetwalker costume, with Bogart and Huston on the set, apparently taken as a good-luck gesture from Sheridan to Huston. Many film-history sources credit Sheridan for a part, though the American Film Institute notes she has not been definitively identified within the film.
- Co-star Tim Holt's father, Jack Holt, a star of silent and early sound Westerns and action films, makes a one-line appearance at the beginning of the film as one of the men down on their luck.

=== Filming ===
The Treasure of the Sierra Madre was one of the early Hollywood films to be filmed on location outside the U.S., but many scenes were filmed back in the studio and elsewhere in the U.S. Filming took five and a half months. Most of the location shooting in Mexico took place in Tampico, Tamaulipas, and at Jungapeo – a remote mountainous area in Michoacán where many of the wilderness scenes were shot. Other scenes were shot in Durango and the actual mountains of the Sierra Madre Occidental in Sonora.

Back in the United States, sets were constructed at the Warner Bros. studio backlot in Burbank (specifically Stages 1 and 6), including a detailed recreation of Tampico.

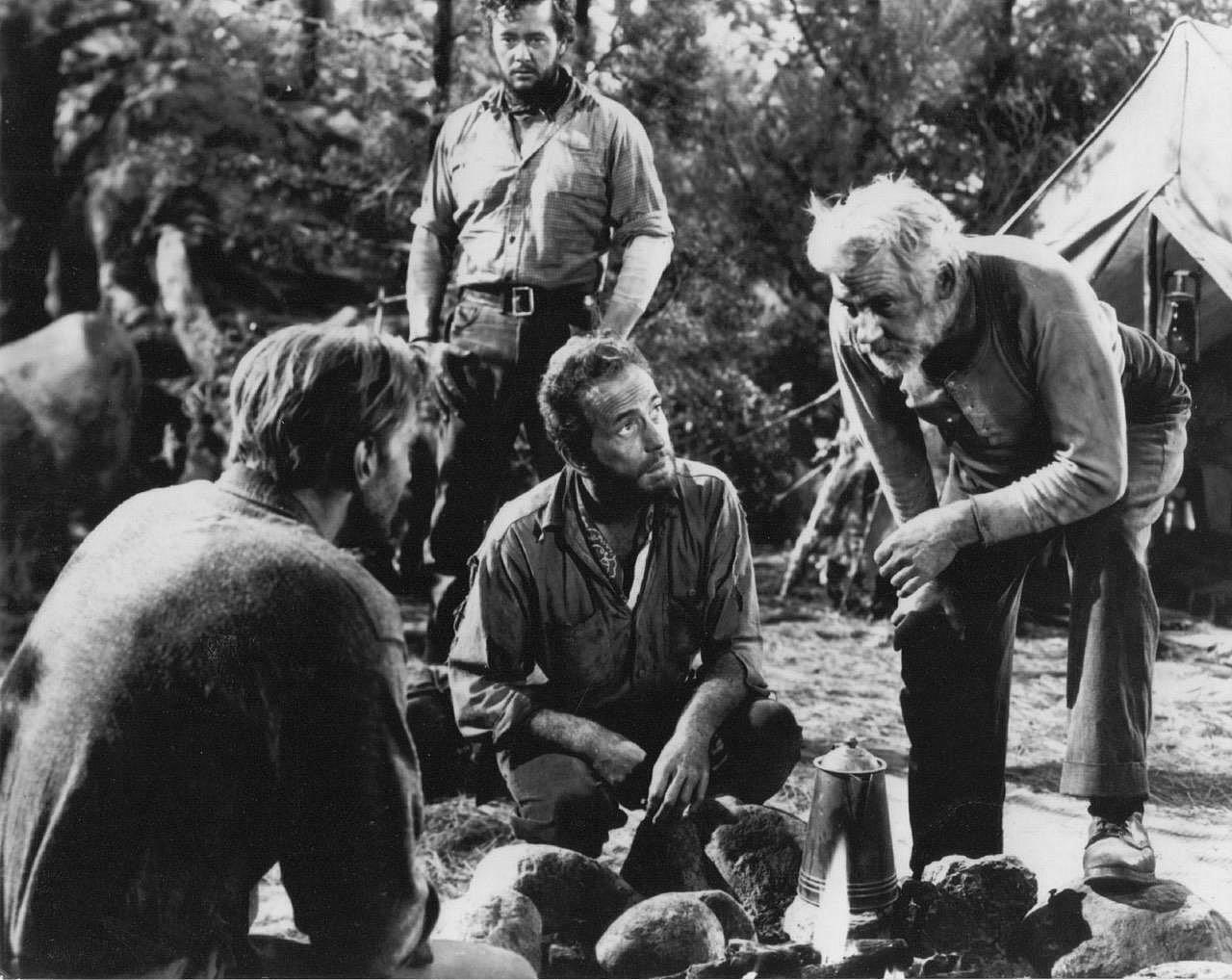
Bruce Bennett, Tim Holt, Humphrey Bogart and Walter Huston

The first scene in the film with Bogart and Holt was the first to be shot. The opening scenes, filmed in longshot on the Plaza de la Libertad in Tampico, show contemporary (1940s) cars and buses, even though the story opens in 1925, as shown by the lottery number's poster.

Just as Huston was starting to shoot scenes in Tampico, the local government inexplicably closed the production. The cast and crew were at a complete loss to understand because Tampico's residents and government had so far been generous. One reason was that a local newspaper had printed a false story accusing the film of being unflattering to Mexico.

Huston soon found out why the newspaper skewered his production. When you wanted to do anything in Tampico, it was customary to bribe the editor of the newspaper, which the crew had failed to do. Fortunately, two of Huston's associates, Diego Rivera and Miguel Covarrubias, went to the president of Mexico. The libelous accusations were dropped, and a few weeks later, the editor of the newspaper was caught in flagrante and shot dead by a jealous husband.

Most of the Mexican extras were paid 10 pesos per day, the equivalent of $2, a considerable amount for an impoverished region at the time.

There were scenes in which Walter Huston had to speak fluent Spanish, a language he did not know. John Huston hired a Mexican to record the lines and then the elder Huston memorized them so well that many thought he knew the language. As with most of the Mexican actors selected from the local population, Alfonso Bedoya's heavily accented pronunciation of English proved a bit of a problem ("horseback" sounded like "whore's back"). Bogart knew only two Spanish words, "Dos Equis", a Mexican beer.

The fight scene in the cantina took five days to shoot. During the shooting of the entire film, John Huston pulled pranks on Bennett, Bedoya (along with Bogart), and Bogart. While most of the film was shot in Mexico, Jack L. Warner had the unit return to Hollywood when the budget started to exceed $3 million. According to production notes recorded by the American Film Institute, the production spent eight weeks shooting in Mexico and ten days filming in the US near Kernville, California. The campfire scenes and Kelly's Rainbow Mines scenes were shot in Kernville.

Though the dailies impressed Warner Bros., Jack L. Warner nearly went berserk with the weekly expenditures. After viewing one scene, Warner threw up his hands and shouted to producer Henry Blanke "Yeah, they're looking for gold all right—mine!" During another screening of dailies, Warner watched Dobbs stumble in the desert in search of water. Warner jumped up in the middle of the scene and shouted to a gaggle of executives "If that s.o.b. doesn't find water soon, I'll go broke!".

Warner had reason to be upset. John Huston and Blanke led him to believe that the film would be an easy picture to make and that they would be in and out of Mexico in a matter of weeks. Warner was notorious for not actually reading scripts and had assumed the film was a B-movie Western. As the full extent of Huston's plans became apparent, Warner became quite angry. He was especially unhappy with the way the film ended, arguing that audiences would not accept it. The initial box-office take was unimpressive, but the film was a huge critical success and more than earned back its original investment of $3 million in its many rereleases.

As production dragged, Bogart, an avid yachtsman, was getting increasingly anxious about missing the Honolulu Race in which he usually took part. Despite assurances from the studio that his work would be done by then, he pestered Huston about finishing in time. Eventually, Huston grabbed Bogart by the nose and twisted hard. Bogart never again asked him to confirm when shooting was expected to finish.

The windstorm in the final scene was created by jet engines borrowed from the Mexican Air Force.

=== John Huston's screenplay ===
Mexican bandit leader "Gold Hat" (portrayed by Alfonso Bedoya) tries to convince Fred C. Dobbs (Humphrey Bogart) that he and his men are Federales.

John Huston's adaptation of Traven's novel was altered to meet Hays Code regulations, which severely limited profanity in film. The original line from the novel was:

"Badges, to god-damned hell with badges! We have no badges. In fact, we don't need badges. I don't have to show you any stinking badges, you god-damned cabrón and chinga tu madre!"

The dialogue as written for the film is:

Gold Hat: "We are Federales...you know, the mounted police."
Dobbs: "If you're the police, where are your badges?"
Gold Hat: "Badges? We ain't got no badges. We don't need no badges! I don't have to show you any stinkin' badges!"

Gold Hat's response as written by Huston and delivered by Bedoya has become famous, and it often is misquoted as "We don't need no stinking badges!" In 2005, the quotation was chosen as No. 36 on the American Film Institute list AFI's 100 Years...100 Movie Quotes.

=== Themes ===
The film often is described as a story about the corrupting influence of greed. Film critic Roger Ebert expanded upon this idea, writing "The movie has never really been about gold but about character." Reviewers have also noted the importance of greed and gold and of nature and its desolateness as an influence on the actions of the men. However, the film's ability to comment on human nature generally has been doubted as Dobbs is evidently flawed from the outset.

== Reception ==
Trailer (1947)

=== Box office ===
According to Variety the film earned $2.3 million in the U.S. in 1948. According to Warner Bros. records, it earned $2,746,000 domestically and $1,349,000 foreign.

=== Critical reviews ===
In The Nation in 1948, critic James Agee wrote: "Treasure of Sierra Madre ... is one of the best things Hollywood has done since it learned to talk; and the movie can take a place, without blushing, among the best ever made ... it is a magnificent and unconventional piece of screen entertainment." British critic Leslie Halliwell gave it two of four stars: "Well-acted but partly miscast action fable on the oldest theme in the world ... " Pauline Kael lauded the film: "One of the strongest of all American films ... The picture is emotionally memorable ... it has a powerful cumulative effect; when it's over you know you've seen something." In his Movie Guide, Leonard Maltin gave the film four of four stars: "Excellent adaptation of B. Traven's tale of gold, greed, and human nature at its worst ... Roger Ebert, writing in 2003: "The Treasure of the Sierra Madre (1948) is a story in the Joseph Conrad tradition, using adventure not as an end in itself, but as a test of its characters. It tells this story with gusto and Huston's love of male camaraderie, and it occasionally breaks into laughter--some funny, some bitterly ironic." Film historian Lee Pfeiffer writing in 2006 stated, "A triumph for director/writer John Huston ... Bogart gives the greatest performance of his career ... His is matched by Walter Huston's ... Oscar-winning performance as a crusty old miner—one of the most immortal acting accomplishments of the American cinema."

On Rotten Tomatoes, the film is one of the few that have an approval rating of 100%, based on 51 reviews, and an average rating of 9.5/10. The website's critical consensus reads "Remade but never duplicated, this darkly humorous morality tale represents John Huston at his finest." The Treasure Of The Sierra Madre is now considered to be among the best films of all time, with some critics calling it Huston's magnum opus.

== Awards and honors ==
At the 21st Academy Awards, The Treasure of The Sierra Madre received four nominations, and won three awards: Best Supporting Actor for Walter Huston, and Best Director and Best Writing, Screenplay for John Huston, his only Oscars. There has been controversy since the 1949 ceremony because of the Academy's choice not to nominate Bogart for the Academy Award for Best Actor, a choice that modern critics and Academy members have since condemned. Bogart's performance has been named the best of his career. British actor Daniel Day-Lewis said that his second Oscar-winning performance as vicious oil baron Daniel Plainview in There Will Be Blood was heavily inspired by Bogart's portrayal of Fred C. Dobbs.

Award	Category	Recipient	Result
Academy Awards	Best Picture	Henry Blanke (for Warner Bros.)	Nominated
Academy Awards	Best Director	John Huston	Won
Academy Awards	Best Supporting Actor	Walter Huston	Won
Academy Awards	Best Screenplay	John Huston	Won
British Academy Film Awards	Best Film from any Source		Nominated
Golden Globe Awards	Best Picture		Won (Note: Tied with Johnny Belinda.)
Golden Globe Awards	Best Supporting Actor	Walter Huston	Won
Golden Globe Awards	Best Director	John Huston	Won
National Board of Review Awards	Top Ten Films		4th Place
National Board of Review Awards	Best Supporting Actor	Walter Huston	Won
National Board of Review Awards	Best Screenplay	John Huston	Won
National Film Preservation Board	National Film Registry		Inducted
New York Film Critics Circle Awards	Best Film		Won
New York Film Critics Circle Awards	Best Director	John Huston	Won
New York Film Critics Circle Awards	Best Actor	Walter Huston	Nominated
Online Film & Television Association Awards	Hall of Fame – Motion Picture		Won
Venice International Film Festival	Grand International Prize of Venice	John Huston	Nominated
Venice International Film Festival	Best Original Music	Max Steiner	Won
Writers Guild of America Awards	Best Written American Drama	John Huston	Nominated
Writers Guild of America Awards	Best Written American Western	John Huston	Won

In 1990, the film was selected for preservation in the United States National Film Registry by the Library of Congress as "culturally, historically, or aesthetically significant". The film was among the first 50 films to be selected.

Critic Leonard Maltin listed The Treasure of the Sierra Madre as one of the "100 Must-See Films of the 20th Century." In 2016, the Directors Guild of America called it the 57th best-directed movie of all time.

Director Stanley Kubrick listed The Treasure of the Sierra Madre as his fourth favorite film of all time in a 1963 edition of Cinema magazine. Director Sam Raimi ranked it as his favorite film of all time in an interview with Rotten Tomatoes, and director Paul Thomas Anderson watched it at night before bed while writing There Will Be Blood. Director Spike Lee listed it as one of the "87 Films Every Aspiring Director Should See".

Breaking Bad creator Vince Gilligan has cited the film as one of his personal favorites and has said that Dobbs was a key influence in creating the character of Walter White. A key scene from the film was emulated in "Buyout", the sixth episode of the series' fifth season.

American Film Institute recognition

- AFI's 100 Years... 100 Movies – No. 30
- AFI's 100 Years... 100 Thrills – No. 67
- AFI's 100 Years... 100 Heroes & Villains:
  - Fred C. Dobbs – Nominated Villain
- AFI's 100 Years... 100 Movie Quotes:
  - "Badges? We ain't got no badges! We don't need no badges! I don't have to show you any stinking badges!" – No. 36
- AFI's 100 Years... 100 Movies (10th Anniversary Edition) – No. 38

In 2006, Writers Guild of America West ranked the John Huston's screenplay 46th in WGA’s list of 101 Greatest Screenplays.

== In popular culture ==
The Stone Roses song "Fools Gold" was inspired by the film. Songwriter Ian Brown said "Three geezers who are skint and they put their money together to get equipment to go looking for gold...Then they all betray each other...That's what the song is about."

The Mexican bandit's line, "Badges? We ain't got no badges. We don't need no badges! I don't have to show you any stinkin' badges!", has been humorously misquoted in various comedy movies and TV shows over the decades since the original film:

- The quote originally appeared in the Monkees episode, (it’s A Nice Place to Visit Episode 33 1967) where Micky Dolenz, dressed as a Mexican bandit, says "we don't need no stinking badges".
- Blazing Saddles released in 1974, refers to the film with the original Monkees' misquoted line "We don't need no stinkin' badges!"
- UHF parodies the same line as: "I don't need no stinkin' badgers!".
- The quote is also misquoted in Sledgehammer as "We don't need no sticking badges", referring to ID badges that stick on people's shirts.
- In Troop Beverly Hills, the Wilderness Girls reject getting awards patches with this (misquoted) line from one of their Hispanic leaders; "We don't need no stinking patches".
- City Slickers 2 also refers to the line – '"Man, what a gold rush. I found the gold. It's mine, I tell you. It's all my gold." ""We don't have to show him no stinking badges. I found the gold! '"
- It also appears in various forms in Gotcha! (1967), Wizards and Warriors (1985) TV series
- Another appearance is from The Office episode, (Blood Drive, Episode 18 Season 5) where Michael Scott, in a stereotypical Spanish accent, jokes " Relationships, We don't need no stinkin' relationships " to the other members of the Lonely Hearts Convention.
- In Spike Lee's 2020 movie Da 5 Bloods, The Bloods are held at gunpoint by a group of gunmen stating that they are Vietnamese officials, when Paul demands to see their badges, the head gunmen respond "We don't need no stinkin' official badges "

Fred C. Dobbs appears in the Looney Tunes short 8 Ball Bunny, delivering his signature phrase: "Say, pardon me, but could you help out a fellow American who's down on his luck?".

Fred C. Dobbs is referred to in various episodes of The Many Loves of Dobie Gillis.

The Fallout: New Vegas expansion pack Dead Money was inspired by the film. The expansion takes place in the Sierra Madre Casino, a pre-war casino which supposedly has a fortune in gold hidden in its vaults. It is stated that many wasteland prospectors died looking for the treasure. At the end of the expansion, the player finds the gold but is forced to leave almost all of it behind, as it is too heavy to carry while they escape.

== See also ==
- John Huston filmography
