= William O. Wallace =

American set decorator

- Born: August 9, 1906; Central Falls, Rhode Island, US
- Died: November 4, 1968 (aged 61–62); Los Angeles, California
- Other name: William G. Wallace
- Occupation: Set decorator
- Years active: 1941–1967

William O. Wallace (August 9, 1906 – November 4, 1968) was an American set decorator who worked throughout the 1940s and 1950s in multiple Hollywood productions. He was Oscar-nominated in 1948 for Jean Negulesco’s Johnny Belinda, and also worked on Young Man with a Horn (1950), Battle Cry (1955) and Nicholas Ray’s seminal Rebel Without a Cause in 1956. He moved into television in the late 1950s, and was chief set decorator on Maverick.
