= Robert M. Haas =

American art director (1889–1962)

- Born: January 3, 1889; Newark, New Jersey
- Died: December 17, 1962 (aged 73); Costa Mesa, California
- Occupation: Art director
- Years active: 1919-1950

Robert M. Haas (January 3, 1889 – December 17, 1962) was an American art director. He was nominated for two Academy Awards in the category Best Art Direction. He worked on over 120 films between 1919 and 1950. He was born in Newark, New Jersey and died in Costa Mesa, California.

== Selected filmography ==
Haas was nominated for two Academy Awards for Best Art Direction:

- Life with Father (1947)
- Johnny Belinda (1948)
