= Johnny Belinda (1967 film) =

- Based on: Johnny Belinda by Elmer Blaney Harris
- Written by: Allan Sloane
- Directed by: Paul Bogart
- Starring: Ian Bannen; David Carradine; Mia Farrow; Barry Sullivan; Ruth White; Jacques Aubuchon; Carol Ann Daniels
- Music by: Charles Fox
- Country of origin: United States
- Original language: English

Production
- Producer: David Susskind
- Editor: Jack Shultis
- Running time: 90 minutes
- Production company: Rediffusion

Original release
- Release: October 22, 1967

Johnny Belinda is a 1967 television film directed by Paul Bogart. It is based upon the play Johnny Belinda by Elmer Blaney Harris. The film was thought to be missing from UK TV archives, but was discovered being sold in the United States on DVD by Kaleidoscope's Ray Langstone and a copy now resides with Kaleidoscope.

== Plot ==
In the small town of Carcadie, Nova Scotia, 1903, a fisherman called Locky McCormick receives advice from Pacquet, the local shopkeeper: young Stella, the new doctor's maidservant, has received an inheritance and it would be a good idea to courtship her. Locky follows Paquet's advice.

Dr. Robert Richardson meets the MacDonald family: Black, the father, Aggie, his sister, and Belinda, who is a deaf-mute young woman. Her appearance is unkempt, almost wild. The family raises farm animals and grind local wheat into flour at their small mill. The doctor realizes that, although she cannot hear or speak, Belinda is very intelligent. Her father, her aunt, and the whole town call Belinda "dummy" and care little about her. Dr. Richardson befriends Belinda and teaches her sign language. She also learns to read, mathematics, how to read lips, and her appearance improves. Belinda's father and aunt realize she is a kind, loving young woman, and the family's relationship changes. Over time, the doctor's affection for her grows.

Meanwhile, Locky has noticed Belinda's beauty. One night when there is a dance in the town and he knows she is alone at home, he leaves the party surreptitiously, goes to Belinda's house, tries to seduce her and when she resist his advances, he rapes her.

When Dr. Richardson comes back from his trip, she finds her sad and unkempt; her family doesn't know why. Dr. Richardson brings her to a colleague who specializes in hearing, who tells him her deafness is irreversible but not hereditary; the baby she is expecting most probably will have a normal hearing.

Back in the town, the MacDonalds are saddened and angered, but it comes to Dr. Richardson explaining to Belinda what is happening to her. She refuses to reveal the father's identity, expressing it is unimportant, and welcomes her future child. Stella, who is about to marry Locky, leaves the doctor's service in anger, revealing him that the town's people believe he abused the poor dummy.

Belinda gives birth at home to a healthy baby boy, whom she names Johnny. Dr. Richardson tells Black that he is willing to marry Belinda, as he has grown into loving her. After Black agrees, Dr. Richardson proposes to her, and they kiss. He asks Belinda whether she understand what "marriage" means: she does.

Boycotted by the locals, the doctor goes away in search of a new home and a job position. He writes to Belinda saying he has found a small but pretty house for them and their son.

A stormy night, Locky goes to the MacDonald house to pay a debt. While Black is at the mill, he approaches at baby Johnny and talks lovingly at him, saying that he'll grow up to be as tall as his papa. Black hears that, realizes what Locky has done, and attacks him. In the fight, Locky kills Black. Then he makes things look as if an accident happened and flees.

Locky bribes Pacquet so in his capacity of member of the town's council the shopkeeper talks the town's people into signing a document that declares Belinda unfit to care for the child and award him to Locky and Stella. With that power, they go to take Johnny. Locky makes Stella to enter alone. She realizes that Belinda is a smart and competent mother, who will never give up her baby. Stella retreats and tells Locky that they have no right to take Johnny away. Locky tells his wife that he has the right because he is the father. When he goes to retrieve the boy, Locky pushes Belinda aside easily, but before he can unlock the door of the room where the baby is, Belinda kills him with her father's shotgun.

Belinda is arrested and goes on trial for murder. At the trial, it is discussed whether she knows the difference between right and wrong, and whether killing someone is wrong, to which she says (through an interpreter) that she knows, sealing her fate. Dr. Richardson demands that the reasons for her behavior be taken into consideration, but his efforts are dismissed. When called to the bench, he is asked whether he is Johnny's father, what he denies. The letter in which he called Johnny his son makes everyone believe that he is lying, and the prosecutor claims that Belinda killed Locky because he had found out that the doctor was the baby's father. At that point, Stella blurts out that her husband had confessed to be the baby's father, and with that it is understood that not only he was Belinda's abuser, but he had attempted maliciously to take away the baby from his mother. The judge dismisses the case as self-defense. Belinda is set free, and she, Johnny, Dr. Richardson and aunt Aggie leave together.

== Cast ==
- Ian Bannen as Dr. Jack Richardson
- David Carradine as Locky
- Mia Farrow as Belinda MacDonald
- Barry Sullivan as Black MacDonald
- Ruth White as Aggie MacDonald
- Jacques Aubuchon as Pacquet
- Carol Ann Daniels as Stella
