= Johnny Belinda (play) =

1940 play by Elmer Blaney Harris

Johnny Belinda is a 1940 play by Elmer Blaney Harris, dealing with the then shocking subjects of rape, murder, bastardy, abuse of a deaf-mute, bigotry and gossip in a small community. It ran for 321 performances on Broadway from September 18, 1940 to June 21, 1941, and has been repeatedly adapted for film, radio, television, and as a musical. The sets for the original production were designed by Frederick Fox.

== Plot summary ==
Set in Souris East, Prince Edward Island, and Charlottetown at the end of the 19th century, the isolated deaf-mute Belinda lives with her father and aunt in the remote farming and fishing community northwest of Nova Scotia.

Belinda is universally referred to as 'the Dummy' until the newly arrived doctor sees her potential and begins teaching her sign language. As her personality emerges from the silence her appearance also changes. She is raped by a local lad and gives birth to a son she names Johnny Belinda. The community assumes the child is the doctor's and shuns him and her family in moral outrage.

Matters come to a head when the biological father attempts to take his infant son from Belinda by force, and she kills him. At the ensuing trial all but the doctor are prepared to condemn Belinda for murder until the truth unexpectedly emerges: that she was acting in self-defense. She is set free with her baby and the doctor's good name is restored.

== Adaptations ==
- Johnny Belinda (1948 film)
- Johnny Belinda CBC Radio play, 1950
- Johnny Belinda NBC Television, 1958
- Johnny Belinda "ITV Play of the Week," 1958
- Johnny Belinda (1959 film), an Australian television play
- Johnny Belinda (1967 film), television movie
- Johnny Belinda, musical play by Mavor Moore and John Fenwick, Charlottetown Festival, 1968
- Belinda, CBC Television adaptation of the musical, telecast March 9, 1977
- Johnny Belinda, 1982 film starring Rosanna Arquette
