= Bob Hope =

American entertainer (1903–2003)

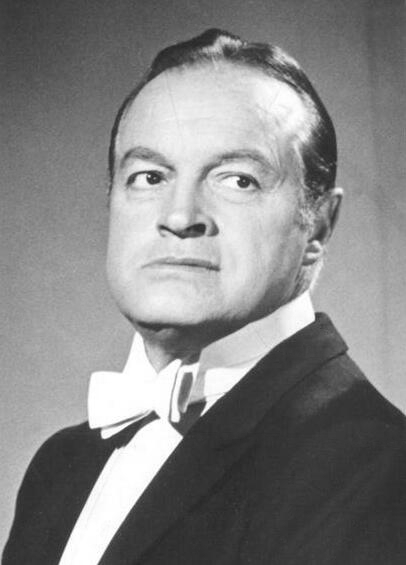
- Hope in 1969
- Born: Leslie Townes Hope; May 29, 1903; Eltham, London, England
- Died: July 27, 2003 (aged 100); Los Angeles, California, U.S.
- Resting place: Bob Hope Memorial Garden, Mission San Fernando Rey de España
- Other names: Lester Hope; Les Hope; Packy East
- Citizenship: United Kingdom (until 1920); United States (from 1920)
- Occupations: Comedian; vaudevillian; actor; singer; dancer; producer
- Years active: 1915–1998
- Spouses: Grace Louise Troxell (m. 1933; div. 1934); Dolores Hope (m. 1934)
- Children: 4
- Relatives: Jack Hope (brother)
- Awards: Full list
- Boxing career
- Height: 5 ft 10 in (178 cm)
- Weight: Super featherweight (128 lb)
- Reach: 72 in (183 cm)

Boxing record
- Wins: 5
- Losses: 1 (see Bob Hope boxing record)
- No contests: 1
- Musical career
- Genres: Traditional pop; easy listening; comedy
- Instrument: Vocals
- Website: bobhope.com

Lester Townes "Bob" Hope (né Leslie Townes Hope; May 29, 1903 – July 27, 2003) was a British-born American comedian, actor, musician, entertainer and producer with a career that spanned nearly 80 years and achievements in vaudeville, network radio, television, and USO Tours. He appeared in more than 70 short and feature films, starring in 54, including a series of seven Road to ... musical comedy films with Bing Crosby as his partner. He reached his 100th birthday 59 days before he died in 2003.

Hope hosted the Academy Awards ceremony a record 19 times. He also appeared in many stage productions and television roles and wrote 14 books. The song "Thanks for the Memory" was his signature tune. He was praised for his comedic timing, specializing in one-liners and rapid-fire delivery of jokes that were often self-deprecating. Between 1941 and 1991, he made 57 tours for the United Service Organizations (USO), entertaining military personnel around the world. In 1997, Congress passed a bill that made him an honorary veteran of the Armed Forces.

Hope was born in the Eltham district of southeast London. He arrived in the United States with his family at the age of four, and grew up near Cleveland, Ohio. He became a boxer in the late 1910s, but moved into show business in the early 1920s, initially as a comedian and dancer on the vaudeville circuit before acting on Broadway. He began appearing on radio and in films in his 30s, starting in 1934.

== Early years ==
Leslie Townes Hope was born on May 29, 1903, in Eltham, County of London (now part of the Royal Borough of Greenwich), in a terraced house at 44 Craigton Road in Well Hall, where there is now a British Film Institute 'Centenary of British Cinema' commemorative plaque in his memory. He was the fifth of seven sons of William Henry Hope, a stonemason from Weston-super-Mare, Somerset, and Welsh mother Avis (née Townes), a light opera singer from Barry, Vale of Glamorgan, who later worked as a cleaner. William and Avis married in April 1891 and lived at 12 Greenwood Street in Barry before moving to Whitehall, Bristol, and then to St George, Bristol. The family emigrated to the United States aboard the SS Philadelphia, passing through Ellis Island, New York on March 30, 1908, before moving on to Cleveland.

From age 12, Hope earned pocket money by singing, dancing, and performing comedy on the street. He entered numerous dancing and amateur talent contests as Lester Hope, and won a prize in 1915 for his impersonation of Charlie Chaplin. For a time, he attended the Boys' Industrial School in Lancaster, Ohio, and as an adult donated sizable sums of money to the institution. He had a brief career as a boxer in 1919, fighting under the name Packy East. He had three wins and one loss, and he participated in a few staged charity bouts later in life. In December 1920, 17-year-old Hope and his brothers became US citizens when their British parents became naturalised Americans. He legally changed his name from Leslie to Lester. Bob attended Fairmount Junior High and then East High in Cleveland but left before graduating.

In 1921, while working as a lineman for a power company, Hope was assisting his brother Jim in clearing trees when a tree fell, striking his face; his injuries required reconstructive surgery, which contributed to his later distinctive appearance. In his teens, he worked as a butcher's assistant, then briefly at Cleveland's Chandler Motor Car Company in his early 20s.

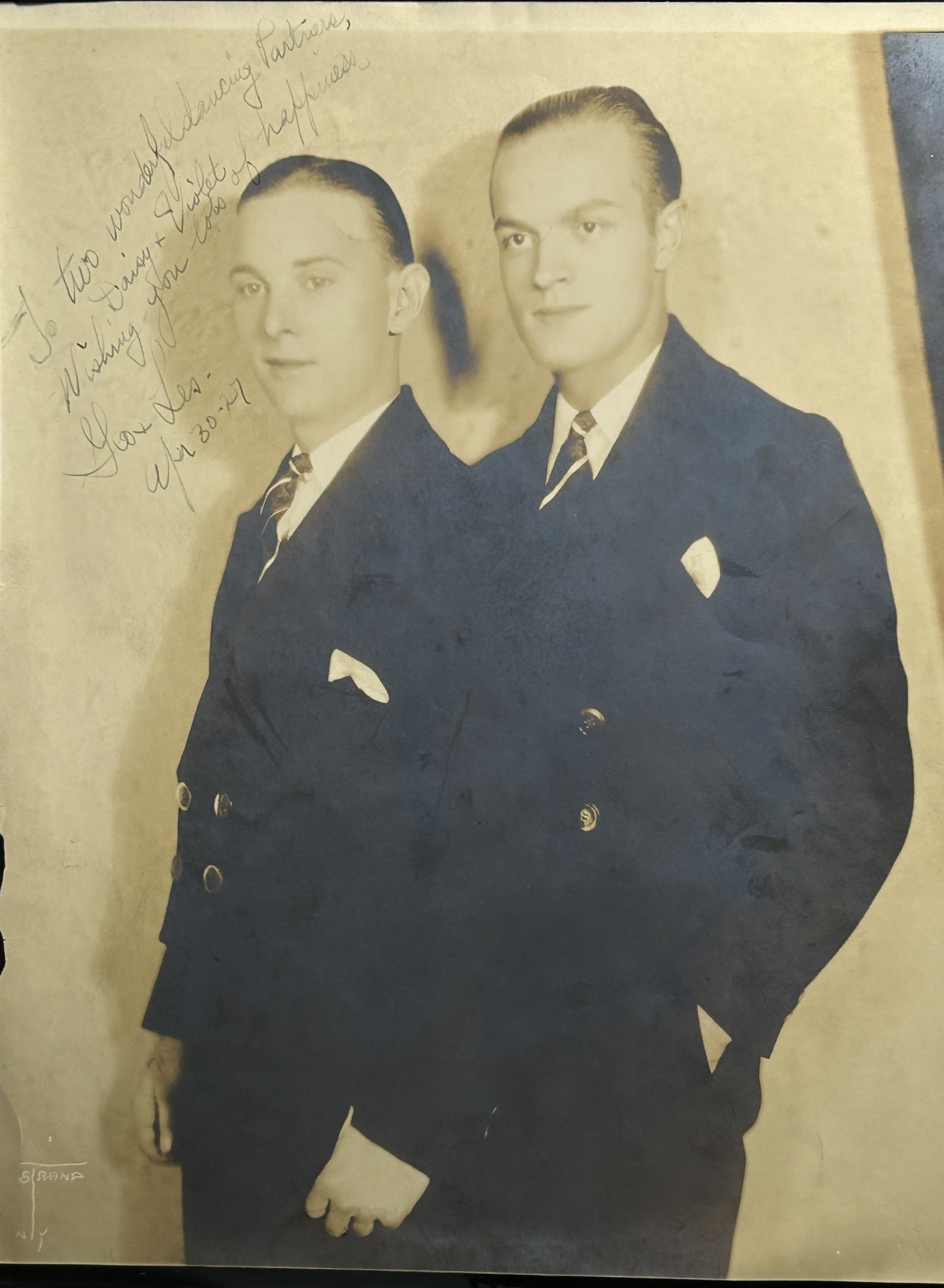
Byrne & Hope inscribed photo for the Hilton Twins

Hope and his girlfriend later signed up for dancing lessons, encouraged after they performed in a three-day engagement at a club. Hope then formed a partnership with Lloyd Durbin, a friend from the dancing school. Silent film comedian Fatty Arbuckle saw them perform in 1925 and found them work with a touring troupe called Hurley's Jolly Follies. Within a year, Hope had formed an act called the "Dancemedians" with George Byrne and the Hilton Sisters, conjoined twins who performed a tap-dancing routine on the vaudeville circuit. Hope and Byrne also had an act as Siamese twins; they sang and danced while wearing blackface until friends advised Hope that he was funnier by himself.

In 1929, Hope informally changed his first name to "Bob". In one version of the story, he named himself after racecar driver Bob Burman. In another, he said that he chose the name because he wanted a name with a "friendly 'Hiya, fellas!' sound" to it. In a 1942 legal document, his legal name appears as Lester Townes Hope. After five years on the vaudeville circuit, Hope was "surprised and humbled" when he failed a 1930 screen test for the RKO-Pathé short-subject studio at Culver City, California.

== Career ==
=== 1927–1937: Early theatre and film roles ===
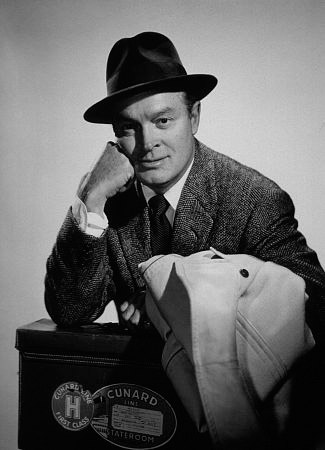
Bob Hope

In the early days, Hope's career included appearances on stage in vaudeville shows and Broadway productions. Hope's first Broadway appearances, in 1927's The Sidewalks of New York and 1928's Ups-a-Daisy, were minor walk-on parts. He returned to Broadway in 1933 to star as Huckleberry Haines in the Jerome Kern and Dorothy Fields musical Roberta. Stints in the musicals Say When, the 1936 Ziegfeld Follies with Fanny Brice, and Red, Hot and Blue with Ethel Merman and Jimmy Durante followed.

He began performing on the radio in 1934 mostly with NBC radio, and switched to television when that medium became popular in the 1950s. He started hosting regular TV specials in 1954, and hosted the Academy Awards 19 times from 1939 through 1977. Overlapping with this was his movie career, spanning 1934 to 1972, and his USO tours, which he conducted from 1941 to 1991.

Hope signed a contract with Educational Pictures of New York for six short comedies. The first was a comedy, Going Spanish (1934). He was not happy with it, and told newspaper columnist Walter Winchell, "When they catch [bank robber] Dillinger, they're going to make him sit through it twice." Educational Pictures took umbrage at the remark and canceled Hope's contract after only the one film. He soon signed with the Vitaphone short-subject studio in Brooklyn, New York, making musical and comedy shorts during the day and performing in Broadway shows in the evenings.

=== 1938–1949: Hollywood contract and stardom ===
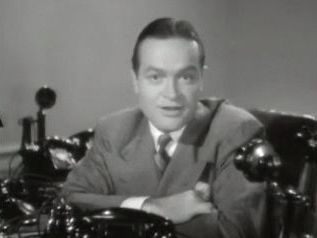
Bob Hope in The Ghost Breakers trailer (1940)

Hope moved to Hollywood when Paramount Pictures signed him for the 1938 film The Big Broadcast of 1938, also starring W. C. Fields. The song "Thanks for the Memory", which later became his trademark, was introduced in the film as a duet with Shirley Ross, accompanied by Shep Fields and his orchestra. The sentimental, fluid nature of the music allowed Hope's writers—he depended heavily upon joke writers throughout his career—to later create variations of the song to fit specific circumstances, such as bidding farewell to troops while on tour or mentioning the names of towns in which he was performing.

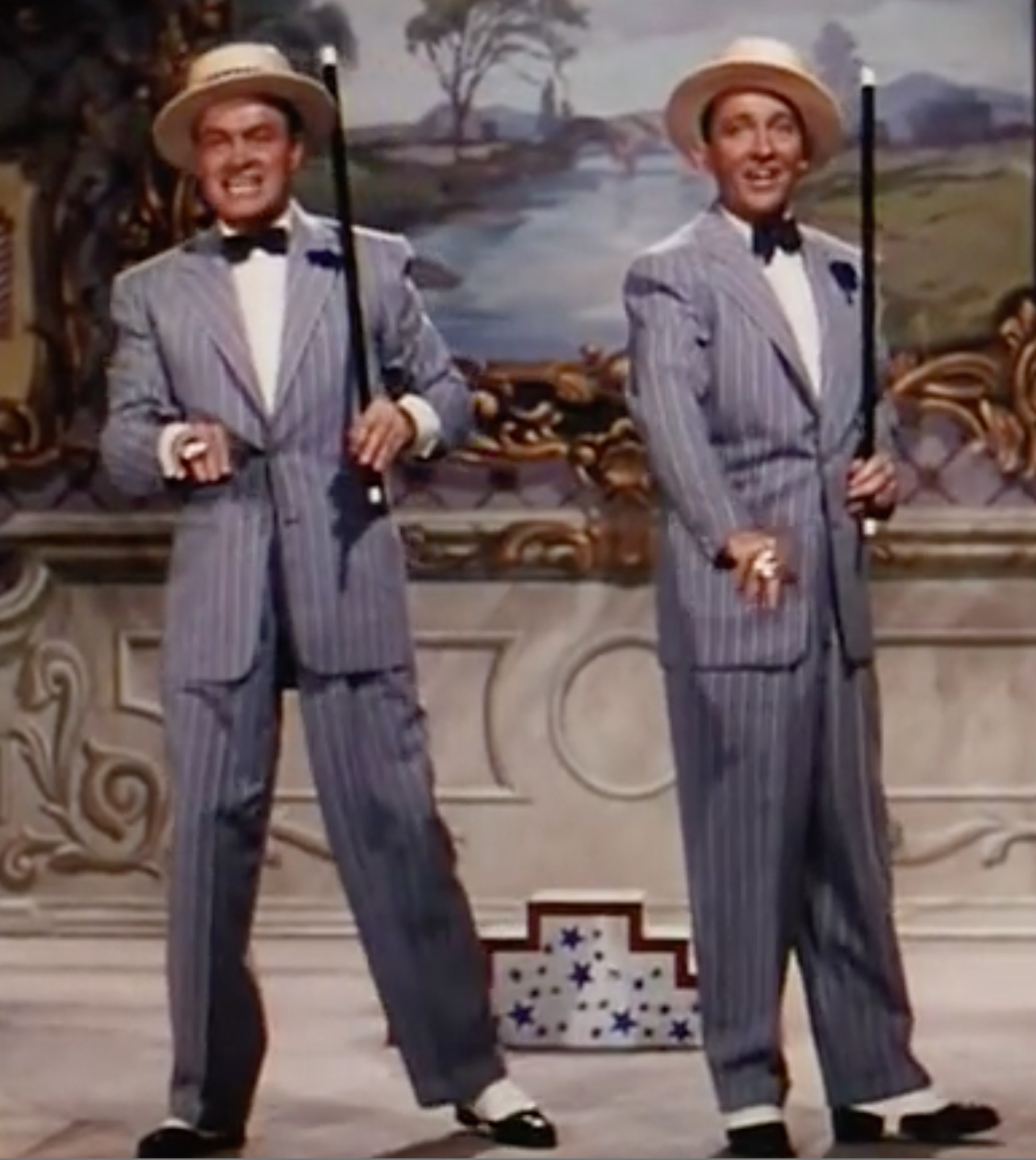
Hope and Bing Crosby sing and dance during the number "Chicago Style" in Road to Bali (1952)

As a film star, Hope was best known for such comedies as My Favorite Brunette and the highly successful "Road" movies in which he starred with Bing Crosby and Dorothy Lamour. The series consists of seven films made between 1940 and 1962: Road to Singapore (1940), Road to Zanzibar (1941), Road to Morocco (1942), Road to Utopia (1946), Road to Rio (1947), Road to Bali (1952), and The Road to Hong Kong (1962). At the outset, Paramount executives were amazed at how relaxed and compatible Hope and Crosby were as a team. What the executives didn't know was that Hope and Crosby had already worked together (on the vaudeville stage in 1932), and that working so easily in the "Road" pictures was just an extension of their old stage act.

Hope had seen Lamour performing as a nightclub singer in New York, and invited her to work on his United Service Organizations (USO) tours of military facilities. Lamour sometimes arrived for filming prepared with her lines, only to be baffled by completely rewritten scripts or ad-libbed dialogue between Hope and Crosby. Hope and Lamour were lifelong friends, and she remains the actress most associated with his film career although he made movies with dozens of leading ladies, including Katharine Hepburn, Paulette Goddard, Hedy Lamarr, Lucille Ball, Rosemary Clooney, Jane Russell, and Elke Sommer.

Hope and Crosby teamed not only for the "Road" pictures, but for many stage, radio, and television appearances and many brief movie appearances together over the decades until Crosby died in 1977. Although the two invested together in oil leases and other business ventures, worked together frequently, and lived near each other, they rarely saw each other socially. After the release of Road to Singapore (1940), Hope's screen career took off, and he had a long and successful run. After an 11-year hiatus from the "Road" genre, he and Crosby reteamed for The Road to Hong Kong (1962), starring the 28-year-old Joan Collins in place of Lamour, whom Crosby thought was too old for the part. They had planned one more movie together in 1977, The Road to the Fountain of Youth, but filming was postponed when Crosby was injured in a fall, and the production was canceled when he suddenly died of heart failure that October.

Hope starred in 54 theatrical features between 1938 and 1972, as well as cameos and short films. Most of his later movies failed to match the success of his 1940s efforts. He was disappointed with his appearance in Cancel My Reservation (1972), his last starring film; critics and filmgoers panned the movie. Though his career as a film star effectively ended in 1972, he did make a few cameo film appearances into the 1980s.

Jerry Colonna and Hope, as caricatured by Sam Berman for NBC's 1947 promotional book

Hope's career in broadcasting began on radio in 1934. His first regular series for NBC Radio was the Woodbury Soap Hour in 1937, on a 26-week contract. Serving as the master of ceremonies for these Rippling Rhythm Revue radio broadcasts, Hope collaborated with the big band leader Shep Fields during this period of transition from vaudeville to radio. A year later, The Pepsodent Show Starring Bob Hope began, and Hope signed a ten-year contract with the show's sponsor, Lever Brothers. He hired eight writers and paid them out of his salary of $2,500 a week. The original staff included Mel Shavelson, Norman Panama, Jack Rose, Sherwood Schwartz, and Schwartz's brother Al. The writing staff eventually grew to 15. The show became the top radio program in the country. Regulars on the series included Jerry Colonna and Barbara Jo Allen as spinster Vera Vague. Hope continued his lucrative career in radio into the 1950s, when radio's popularity began being overshadowed by the upstart television medium.

=== 1950–1979: Television specials ===
Hope did many specials for the NBC television network in the following decades, beginning in April 1950. He was one of the first people to use cue cards. The shows often were sponsored by Frigidaire (early 1950s), General Motors (1955–61), Chrysler (1963–73), and Texaco (1975–85). Hope's Christmas specials were popular favorites and often featured a performance of "Silver Bells"—from his 1951 film The Lemon Drop Kid—done as a duet with an often much younger female guest star such as Barbara Mandrell, Olivia Newton-John, Barbara Eden, and Brooke Shields, or with his wife Dolores, a former singer with whom he dueted on two specials.

On April 26, 1970, CBS released the Raquel Welch television special Raquel!; in it Hope appears as a guest. Hope's 1970 Christmas special for NBC—filmed in Vietnam in front of military audiences at the height of the war—is on the list of the highest-rated broadcasts in US history. It was seen by more than 60 percent of the US households watching television. Likely the most unusual of his television specials was Joys!, a parody of murder mystery narratives, where the audience discovers at the end of the broadcast that Johnny Carson was the villain.

Beginning in early 1950, Hope licensed rights to publish a celebrity comic book titled The Adventures of Bob Hope to National Periodical Publications, alias DC Comics. The comic, originally featuring publicity stills of Hope on the cover, was entirely made up of fictional stories, eventually including fictitious relatives, a high school taught by movie monsters, and a superhero called Super-Hip. It was published intermittently and continued publication through issue No. 109 in 1969. Writers included Arnold Drake, and illustrators included Bob Oksner and (for the last four issues) Neal Adams. Hope reprised his role as Huck Haines in a 1958 production of Roberta at The Muny Theater in Forest Park in St. Louis, Missouri. Additionally, Hope rescued the Eltham Little Theatre in England from closure by providing funds to buy the property. He continued his interest and support, and regularly visited the facility when in London. The theater was renamed in his honor in 1982.

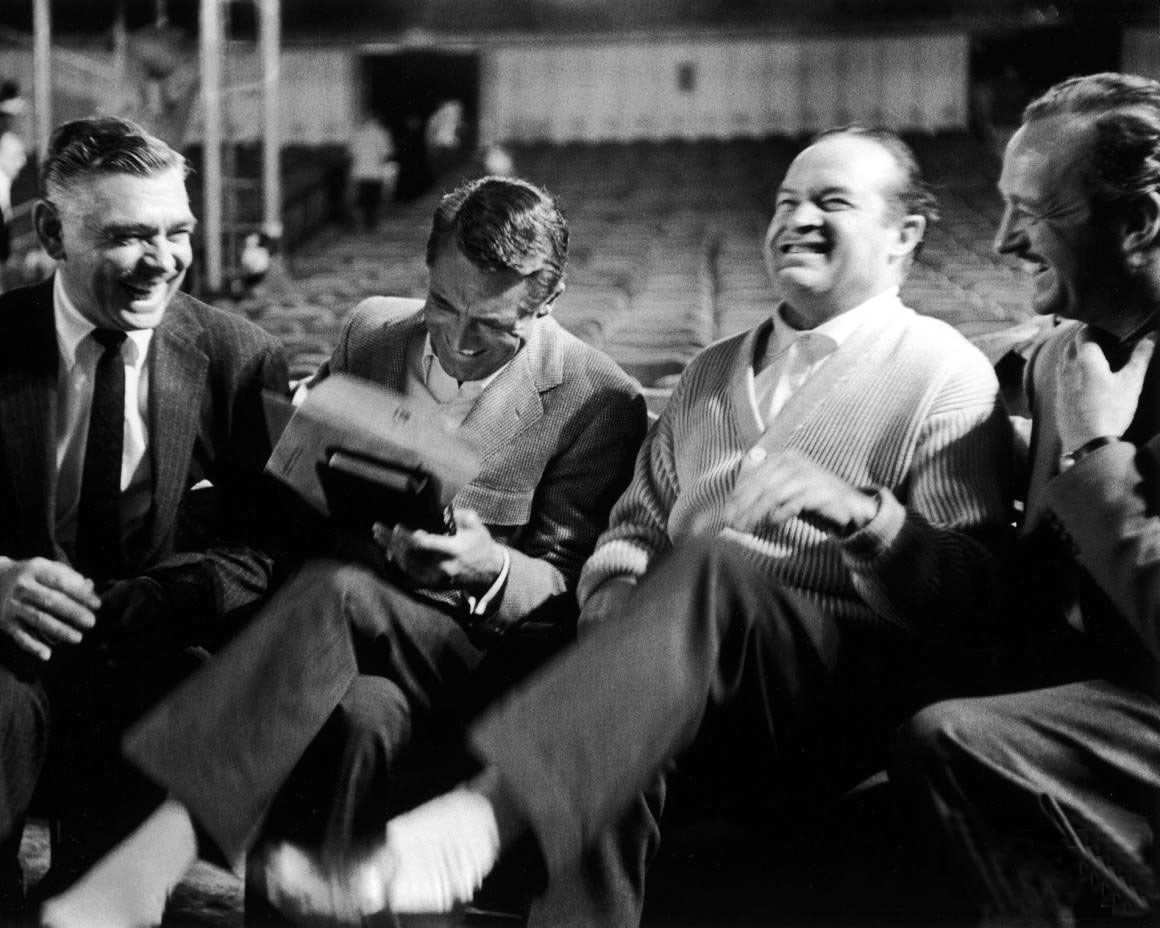
With Clark Gable, Cary Grant, and David Niven in the 1950s

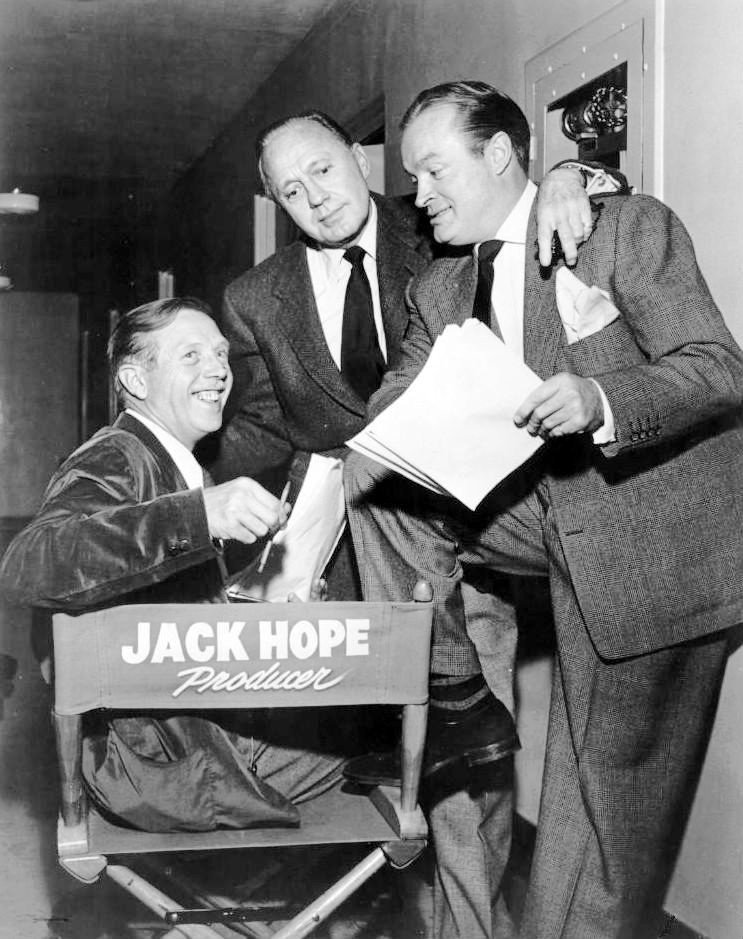
Hope (right) with his brother Jack (seated), who produced his early 1950s show, with comedian Jack Benny

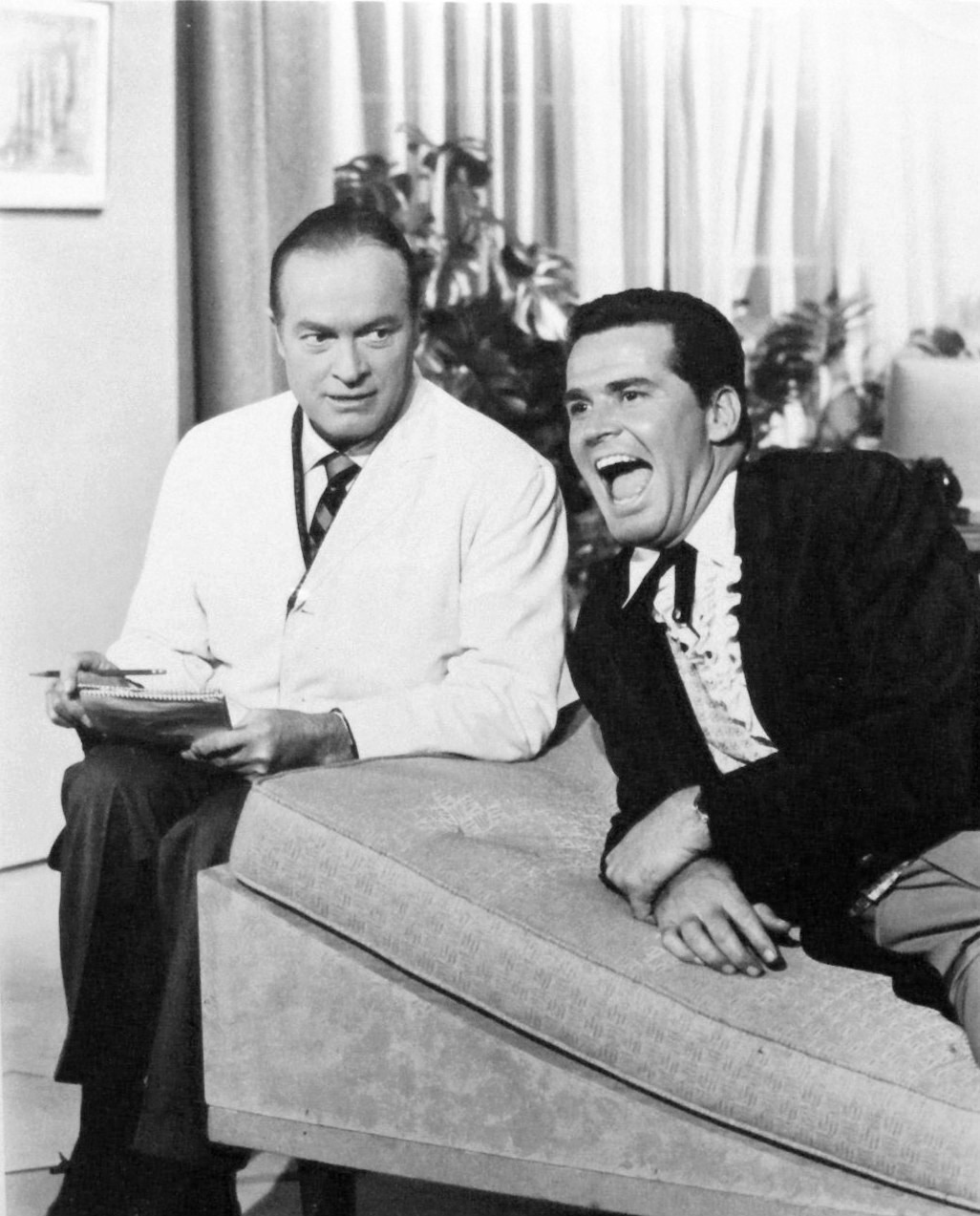
Hope with James Garner (1961)

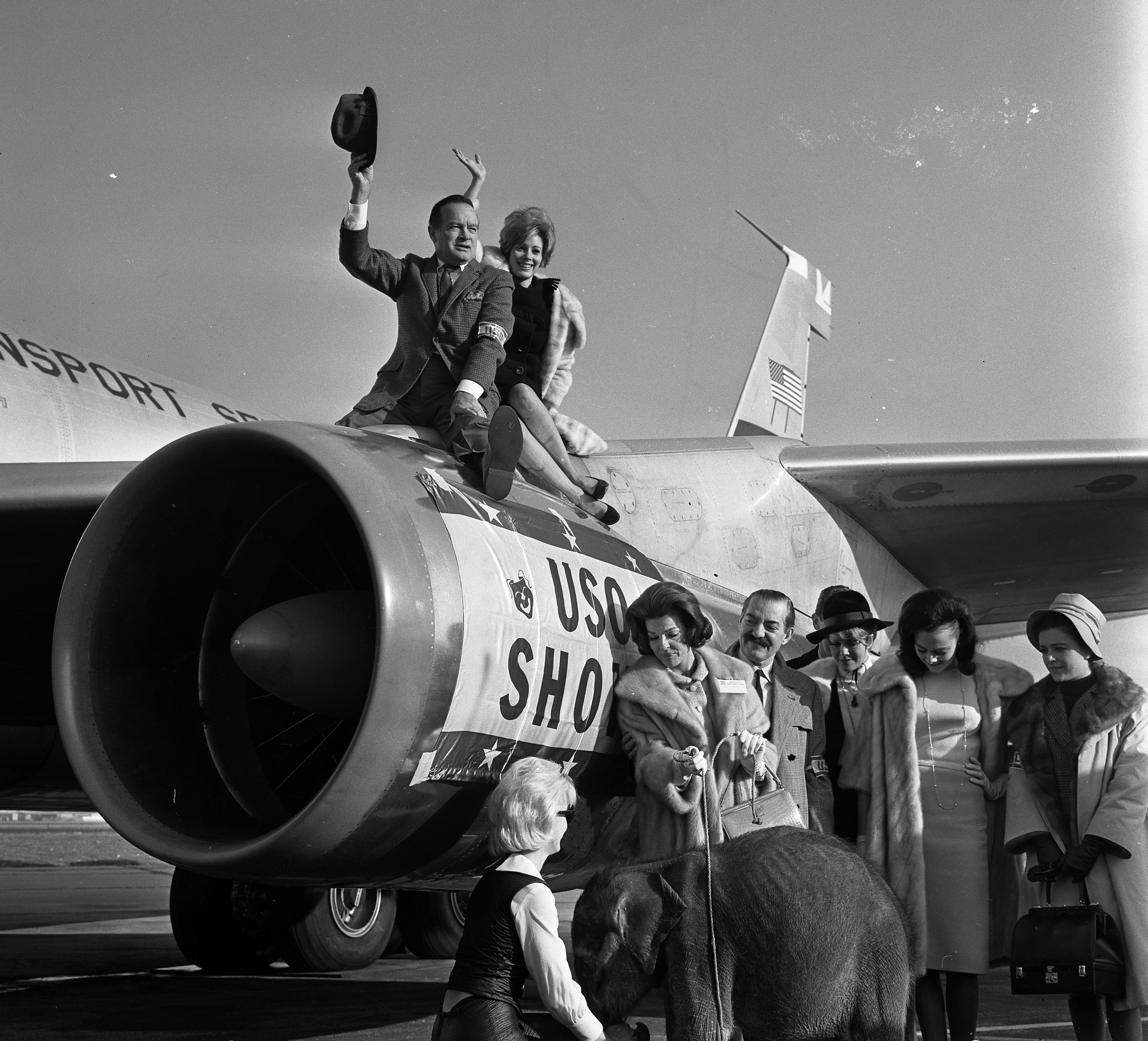
With Jill St. John and entourage at LAX in 1964

=== 1980–1996: Later appearances ===
Hope made a guest appearance on The Golden Girls, season 4, episode 17 (aired February 25, 1989) called "You Gotta Have Hope" in which Rose is convinced Bob Hope is her father. In 1992, Hope made a guest appearance as himself on the animated Fox series The Simpsons in the episode "Lisa the Beauty Queen" (season 4, episode 4). His 90th birthday television celebration in May 1993, Bob Hope: The First 90 Years, won an Emmy Award for Outstanding Variety, Music Or Comedy Special. Toward the end of his career, worsening vision problems rendered him unable to read his cue cards. In October 1996, he announced he was ending his 60-year contract with NBC, joking that he "decided to become a free agent". His final television special, Laughing with the Presidents, was broadcast in November 1996, with host Tony Danza helping him present a personal retrospective of presidents of the United States known to Hope, a frequent White House visitor over the years. The special, though different from his usual specials, received high praise from Variety, as well as other reviews. Following a brief appearance at the 50th Primetime Emmy Awards in 1997, Hope made his last TV appearance in a 1997 commercial about the introduction of Big Kmart, directed by Penny Marshall.

Hope continued an active entertainment career past his 90th birthday, concentrating on his television specials and USO tours. Although he retired from starring in feature films after Cancel My Reservation, he made several cameos in films and co-starred with Don Ameche in the television film A Masterpiece of Murder (1986). A television special created for his 80th birthday in 1983 at the Kennedy Center in Washington, D.C., featured President Ronald Reagan, actress Lucille Ball, comedian-actor-writer George Burns, and many others. In 1985 he was presented with the Life Achievement Award at the Kennedy Center Honors, and in 1998 he was appointed an honorary Knight Commander of the Most Excellent Order of the British Empire (KBE) by Queen Elizabeth II. Upon accepting the appointment, Hope quipped, "I'm speechless. 70 years of ad lib material and I'm speechless."

== Other ventures ==
=== Academy Awards host ===
Hope was host of the Academy Awards ceremony 19 times between 1940 and 1977. His supposedly feigned desire for an Oscar became part of his act. While introducing the 1968 telecast, he quipped, "Welcome to the Academy Awards, or, as it's known at my house, Passover." Although he was never nominated for an Oscar, the Academy of Motion Picture Arts and Sciences honored him with four honorary awards, and in 1960 presented him with the Jean Hersholt Humanitarian Award, given each year as part of the Oscars ceremony.

=== USO involvement ===
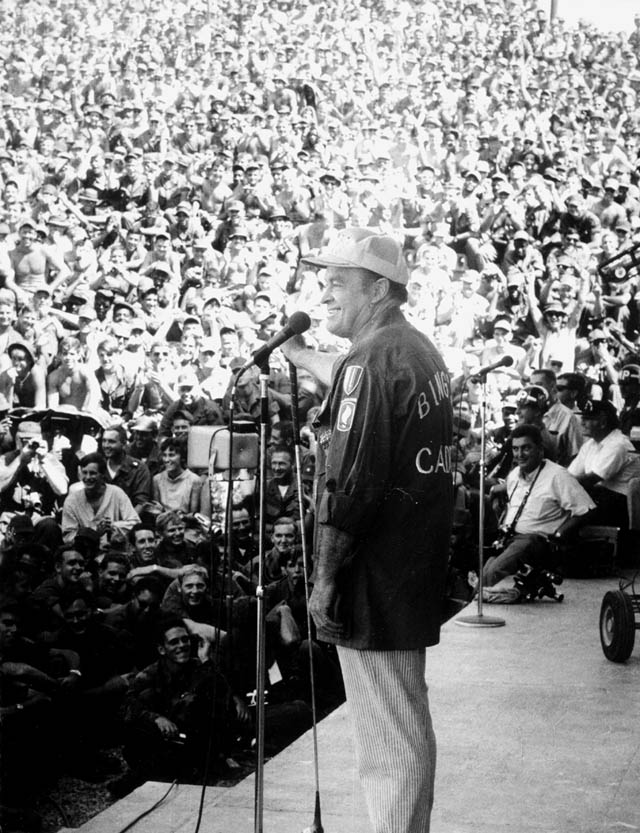
Hope at a USO show

While aboard RMS Queen Mary when World War II began in September 1939, Hope volunteered to perform a special show for the passengers, during which he sang "Thanks for the Memory" with rewritten lyrics. He performed his first USO show on May 6, 1941, at March Field in California, and continued to travel and entertain troops for the rest of World War II, later during the Korean War, the Vietnam War, the third phase of the Lebanon Civil War, the latter years of the Iran–Iraq War, and the Persian Gulf War. His USO career lasted a half-century during which he headlined 57 times.

He had a deep respect for the men and women who served in the armed forces, and this was reflected in his willingness to go anywhere to entertain them. However, during the highly controversial Vietnam War, Hope had trouble convincing some performers to join him on tour, but he was accompanied on at least one USO tour by Ann-Margret. Anti-war sentiment was high, and his pro-troop stance made him a target of criticism from some quarters. Some shows were drowned out by boos; others were listened to in silence.

The tours were funded by the U.S. Department of Defense, Hope's television sponsors, and by NBC, the network that broadcast the television specials created after each tour from footage shot on location. However, the footage and shows were owned by Hope's own production company, which made them very lucrative ventures for him, as outlined by writer Richard Zoglin in his 2014 biography Hope: Entertainer of the Century.

Hope sometimes recruited his own family members for USO travel. His wife, Dolores, sang from atop an armored vehicle during the Desert Storm tour, and granddaughter Miranda appeared alongside him on an aircraft carrier in the Indian Ocean. Of Hope's USO shows in World War II, novelist John Steinbeck, who then was working as a war correspondent, wrote in 1943:

When the time for recognition of service to the nation in wartime comes to be considered, Bob Hope should be high on the list. This man drives himself and is driven. It is impossible to see how he can do so much, can cover so much ground, can work so hard, and can be so effective. He works month after month at a pace that would kill most people.

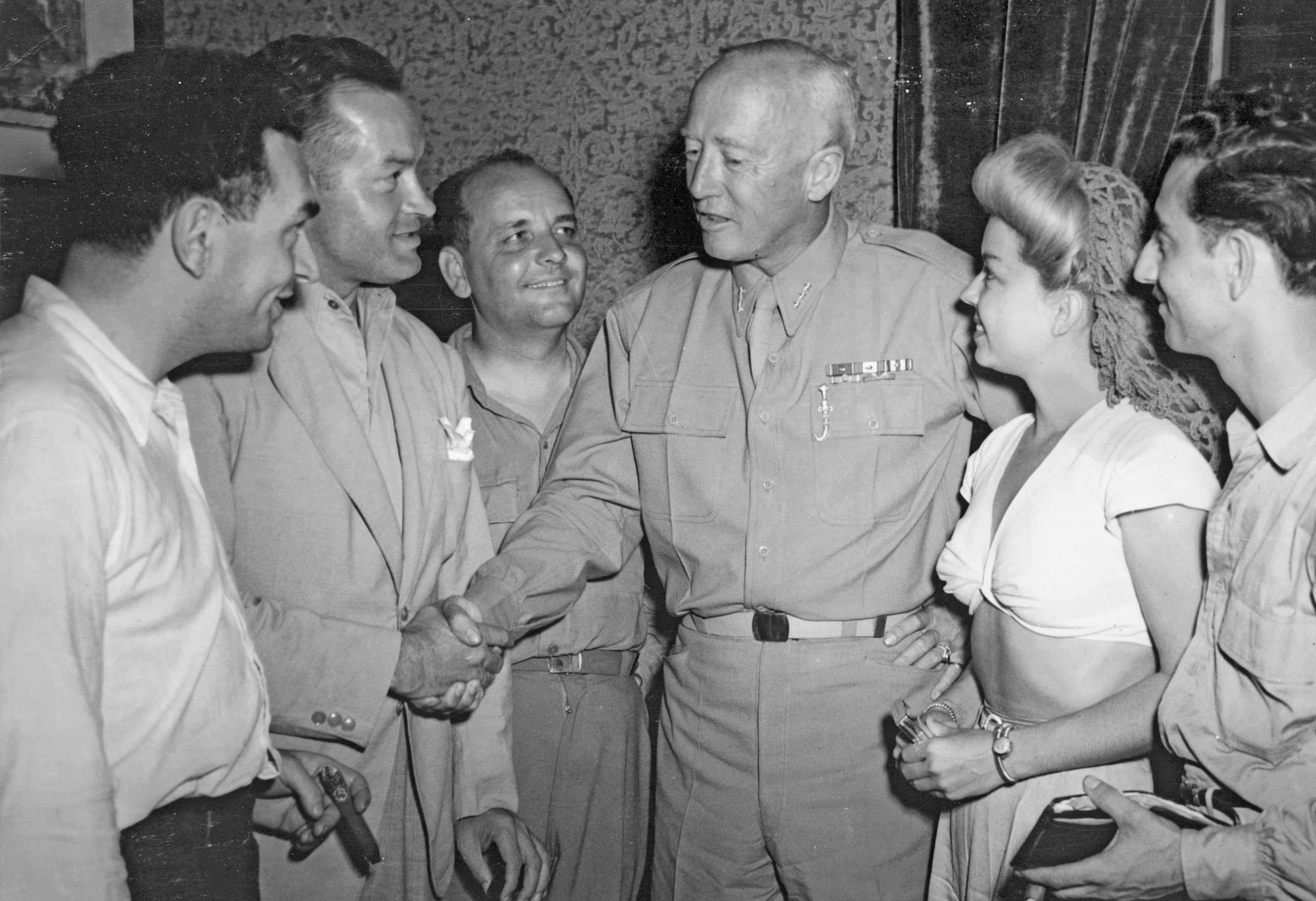
(Left to Right) Writer Hal Block, Hope, writer/actor Barney Dean, General George Patton, singer Frances Langford, and musician Tony Romano in Sicily on August 21, 1943

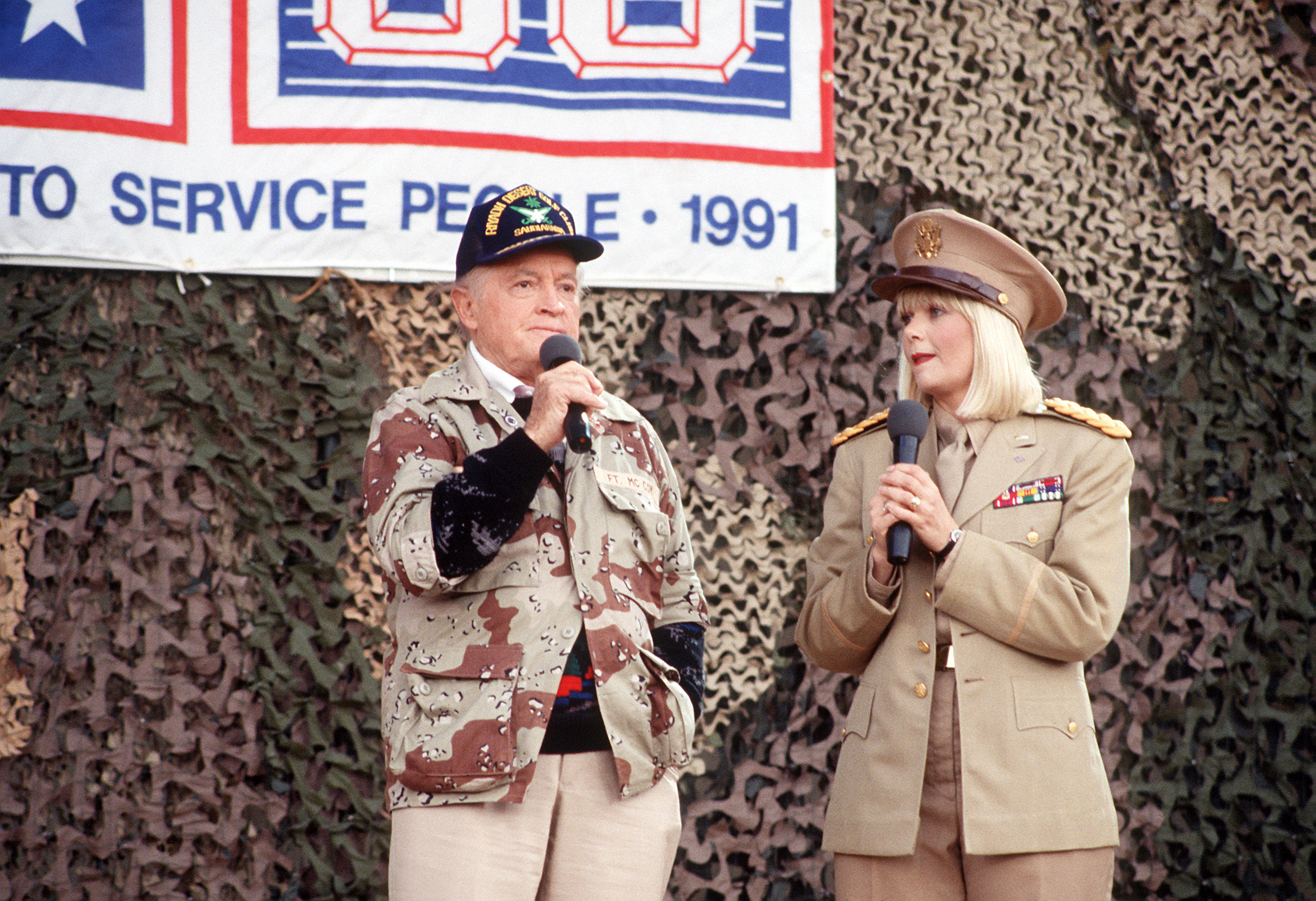
Hope and actress Ann Jillian perform in the USO Christmas Tour during Operation Desert Shield, 1990

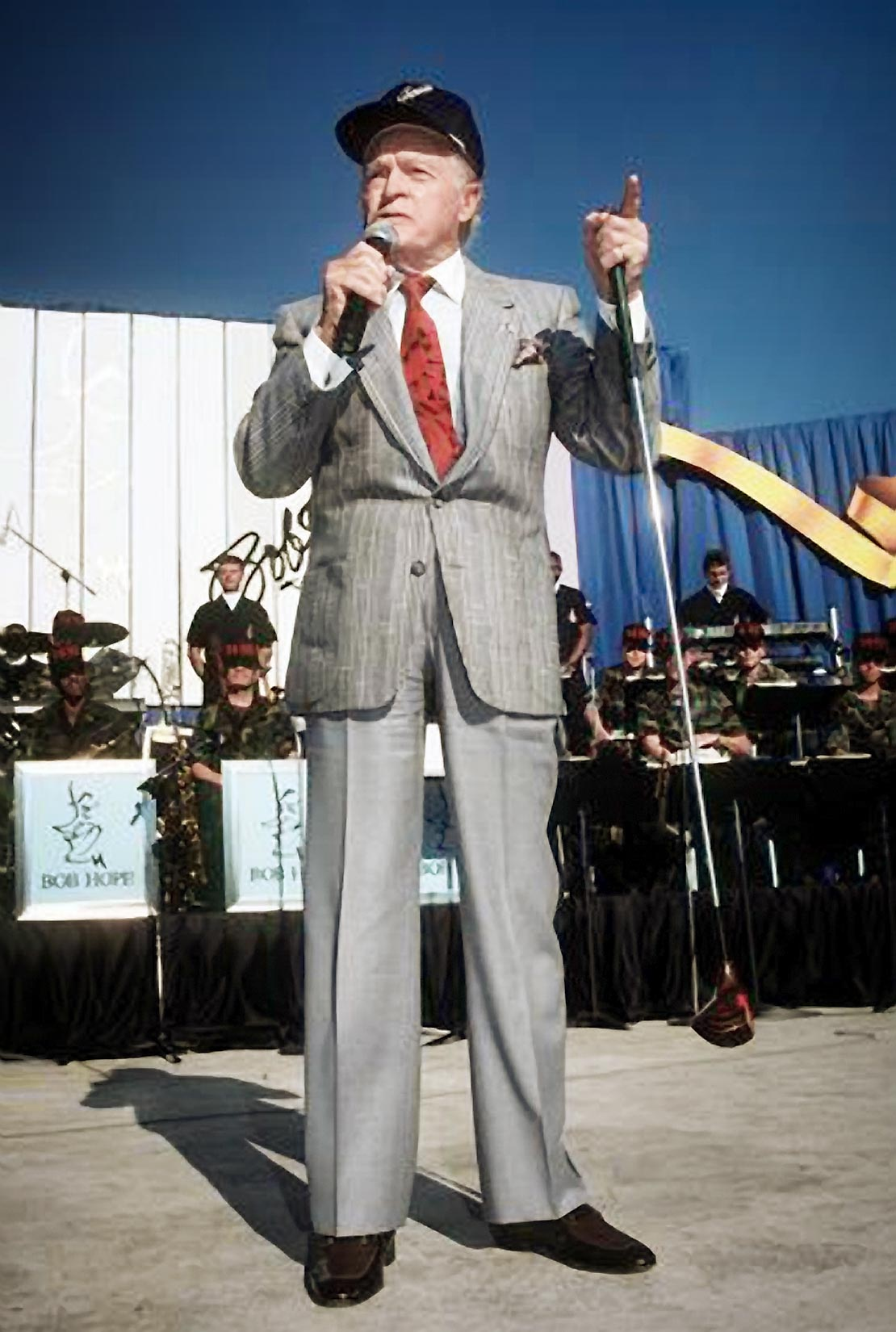
Hope at Lackland Air Force Base in Texas in 1990

Along with his best friend Bing Crosby, Hope was offered a commission in the United States Navy as lieutenant commander during World War II, but FDR intervened, believing it would be better for troop morale if they kept doing what they were doing by playing for all branches of military service.

For his service to his nation through the USO, he was awarded the Sylvanus Thayer Award by the United States Military Academy at West Point in 1968, the first entertainer to receive the award. A 1997 act of Congress signed by President Bill Clinton named Hope an "Honorary Veteran". He remarked, "I've been given many awards in my lifetime, but to be numbered among the men and women I admire most is the greatest honor I have ever received." In an homage to Hope, comedian/TV host Stephen Colbert carried a golf club on stage during the week of USO performances he taped for his TV show The Colbert Report during the 2009 season.

Dear Bob...: Bob Hope's Wartime Correspondence with the G.I.s of World War II, written by Martha Bolton (first woman staff writer for Bob Hope) and Linda Hope (his elder daughter), is a collection of some of his letter to the troops.

=== Sports car racing ===
During a short stint in 1960, Hope became a part owner of the Riverside International Raceway in Moreno Valley, California, along with Los Angeles Rams co-owner Fred Levy Jr. and oil tycoon Ed Pauley for $800,000 (adjusted to $7.0 million in 2020). Les Richter was made president of the raceway.

=== Land development ===
Hope owned thousands of acres of Southern California, and was involved in numerous land developments.

He settled in Palm Springs, California, in 1946, and began to acquire and develop land throughout the area. In 1948, he was named "Honorary Mayor" of the community.

He also owned an East Coast race track. the "Atlantic City Race Course," with Frank Sinatra and others, at its start in 1946.

== Influence ==
In an interview on NPR, Terry Gross said, "Woody Allen and Conan O'Brien are two of the people who have referred to Bob Hope as influences. And I think influences in part on their own personas as not being this suave, handsome, macho guy." Hope biographer Zoglin agreed saying, "Woody continually said, this was the guy who influenced me more than anyone else. And that character - that kind of scared character, the guy talk - nervous, talking his way through, you know, bad times and scary times. That was Woody Allen's character in Sleeper (1973) and Love and Death (1975). He always said that he and Diane Keaton in those films were basically like Hope and Crosby".

Conan O'Brien also cited Hope as an influence saying, "I loved Woody Allen. And Woody Allen says, oh, I love Bob Hope, he really influenced me. And I thought, what are you talking about? How did Bob Hope influence you in any way?...Then I went back and I started looking at seeing some of the movies. And you see it, you see that that the character that Woody Allen does is a character that I think was really, to a large extent invented by Bob Hope."

== Artistry and legacy ==
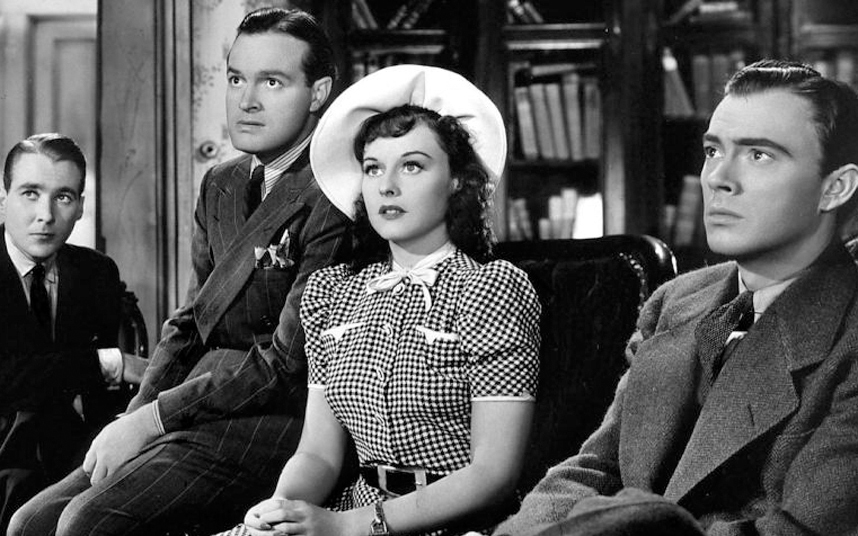
Douglass Montgomery, Bob Hope, Paulette Goddard and John Beal in The Cat and the Canary (1939)

Hope helped establish modern American comedy. He was widely praised for his comedic timing and his specialization in the use of one-liners and rapid-fire delivery of jokes. He was known for his style of self-deprecating jokes, first building himself up and then tearing himself down. He performed hundreds of times per year. Such early films as The Cat and the Canary (1939) and The Paleface (1948) were financially successful and praised by critics, and by the mid-1940s, with his radio program getting good ratings as well, he was one of the most popular entertainers in the United States. When Paramount threatened to stop production of the "Road" pictures in 1945, they received 75,000 letters of protest.

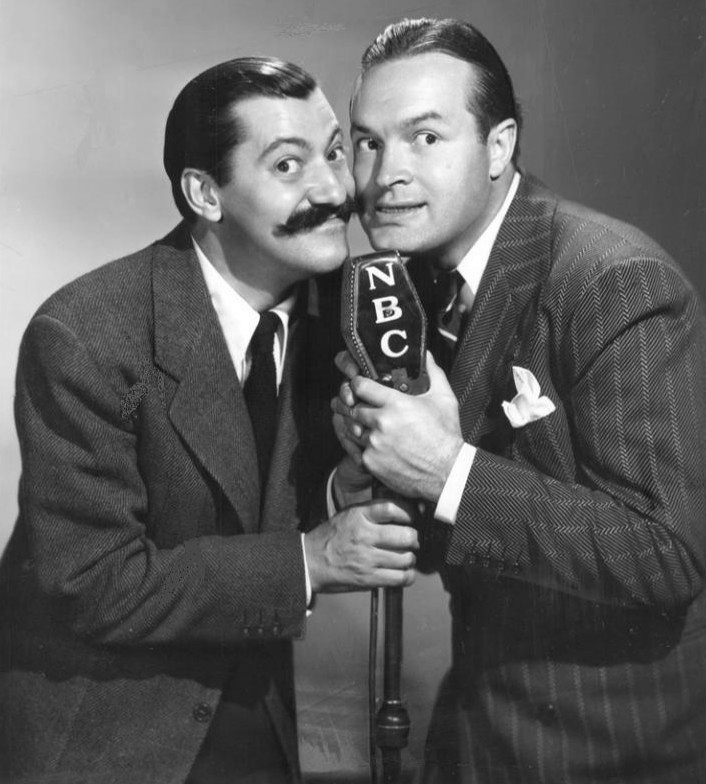
Hope and his comic sidekick, Jerry Colonna, sporting his trademark handlebar mustache in 1940

Hope had no faith in his skills as a dramatic actor, and his performances of that type were not as well received. He had been well known in radio until the late 1940s; however, as his ratings began to slip in the 1950s, he switched to television and became an early pioneer of that medium. He published several books, notably dictating to ghostwriters about his wartime experiences.

Although Hope made an effort to keep his material up to date, he never adapted his comic persona or his routines to any great degree. As Hollywood began to transition to the "New Hollywood" era in the 1960s, he reacted negatively, such as when he hosted the 40th Academy Awards in 1968 and voiced his contempt by mocking the show's delay because of the assassination of Martin Luther King Jr. and condescendingly greeted attending younger actors on stage—such as Dustin Hoffman, who was 30 at the time—as children. By the 1970s, his popularity was beginning to wane with military personnel and with the movie-going public in general. However, he continued doing USO tours into the 1980s and continued to appear on television into the 1990s. Former First Lady Nancy Reagan, a close friend and frequent host to him at the White House, called Hope "America's most honored citizen and our favorite clown".

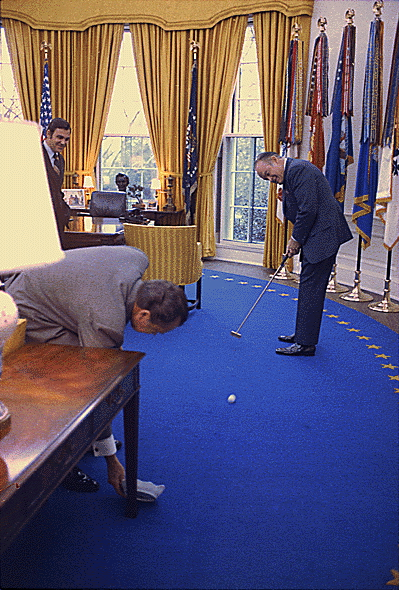
Hope, a golf fan, putting a golf ball into an ashtray held by President Richard Nixon in the Oval Office in 1973

Hope was well known as an avid golfer, playing in as many as 150 charity tournaments a year. Introduced to the game in the 1930s while performing in Winnipeg, Canada, he eventually played to a four handicap. His love for the game—and the humor he could find in it—made him a sought-after foursome member. He once remarked that President Dwight D. Eisenhower gave up golf for painting: "Fewer strokes, you know." He also was quoted as saying, "It's wonderful how you can start out with three strangers in the morning, play 18 holes, and by the time the day is over you have three solid enemies."

A golf club became an integral prop for Hope during the standup segments of his television specials and USO shows. In 1978 he putted against the then-two-year-old Tiger Woods in a television appearance with the actor Jimmy Stewart on The Mike Douglas Show.

The Bob Hope Classic, founded in 1960, made history in 1995 when Hope teed up for the opening round in a foursome that included presidents Gerald Ford, George H. W. Bush, and Bill Clinton, the only time three U.S. presidents played in the same golf foursome. The event, now known as the CareerBuilder Challenge, was one of the few PGA Tour tournaments that took place over five rounds, until the 2012 tournament when it was cut back to the conventional four.

Hope had a heavy interest in sports beyond golf and his brief fling as a professional boxer in his youth. In 1946, he bought a small stake in the Cleveland Indians professional baseball team and held it for most of the rest of his life. He appeared on the June 3, 1963, cover of Sports Illustrated magazine wearing an Indians uniform, and sang a special version of "Thanks for the Memories" after the Indians' last game at Cleveland Stadium on October 3, 1993. He also bought a share with Bing Crosby of the Los Angeles Rams football team in 1947, but sold it in 1962. He frequently used his television specials to promote the annual AP College Football All-America Team. The players would come onstage one by one and introduce themselves, then Hope, often dressed in a football uniform, would give a one-liner about the player or his school.

== Acting credits and accolades ==
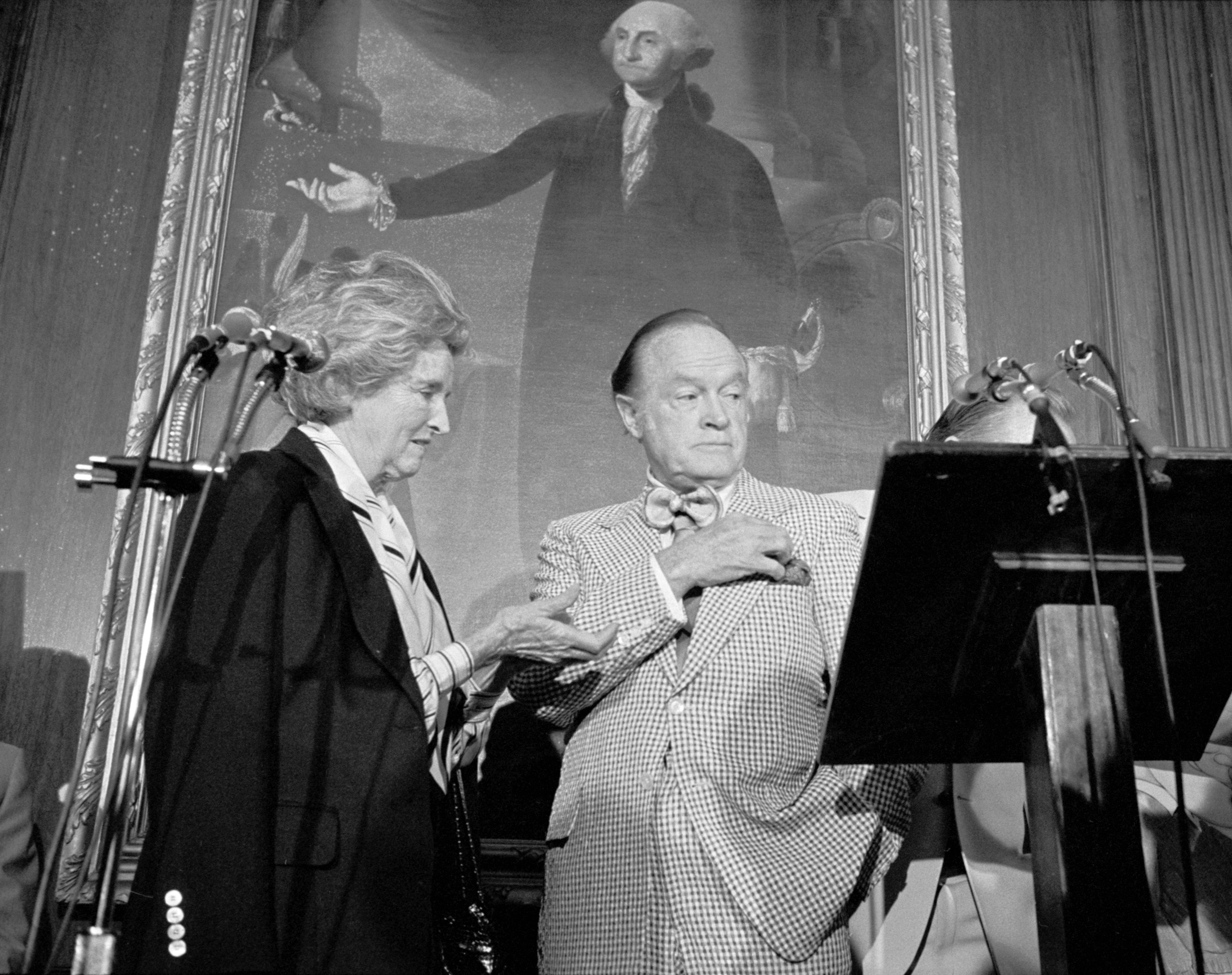
Hope and his wife Dolores on Capitol Hill as he received an award in 1978

Hope was awarded more than 2,000 honors and awards, including 54 honorary university doctorates. In 1963 President John F. Kennedy awarded him the Congressional Gold Medal for service to his country. President Lyndon Johnson bestowed the Presidential Medal of Freedom in 1969 for his service to the armed forces through the USO. In 1982 he received the S. Roger Horchow Award for Greatest Public Service by a Private Citizen, an honor given annually by Jefferson Awards. He was presented with the National Medal of Arts in 1995 and received the Ronald Reagan Freedom Award in 1997. On June 10, 1980, he became the 64th—and only civilian—recipient of the United States Air Force Order of the Sword which recognizes individuals who have made significant contributions to the enlisted corps.

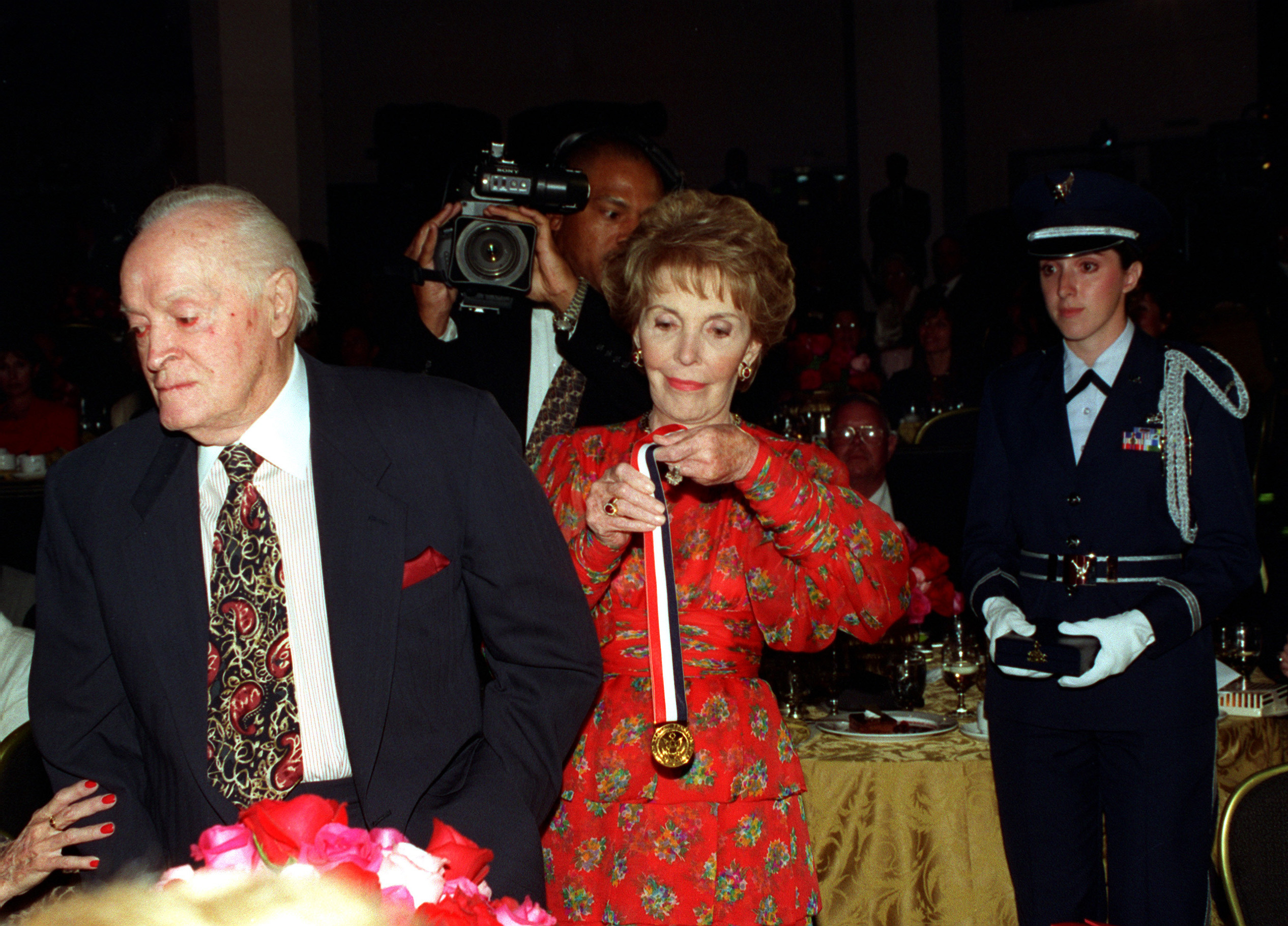
Nancy Reagan prepares to present Hope (then aged 94) with the Ronald Reagan Freedom Award, July 1997

Several buildings and facilities were renamed for Hope, including the historic Fox California Theatre in downtown Stockton, California, and the Bob Hope Airport in Burbank, California. There is a Bob Hope Gallery at the Library of Congress. In memory of his mother, Avis Townes Hope, Bob and Dolores Hope gave the Basilica of the National Shrine of the Immaculate Conception in Washington, D.C., a chapel called the Chapel of Our Lady of Hope. USNS Bob Hope (T-AKR-300) of the U.S. Military Sealift Command was named for the performer in 1997. It is one of very few U.S. naval ships that were named after living people. The Air Force named a C-17 Globemaster III transport aircraft the Spirit of Bob Hope.

In 1965, he was awarded an honorary Doctor of Humane Letters (L.H.D.) degree from Whittier College.

In 1978, Hope was invited to dot the "i" in the Ohio State University Marching Band's "Script Ohio" formation, an honor only given to non-band members on 14 occasions from 1936 through 2016. Woody Allen wrote and narrated a documentary honoring him, My Favorite Comedian, shown at Lincoln Center. In Hope's hometown of Cleveland, the refurbished Lorain-Carnegie Bridge was renamed the Hope Memorial Bridge in 1983, though differing claims have been made as to whether the bridge honors Hope himself, his entire family, or his stonemason father who helped in the bridge's construction. Also, East 14th Street near Playhouse Square in Cleveland's theater district was renamed Memory Lane-Bob Hope Way in 2003 in honor of the entertainer's 100th birthday.

In 1992, Hope was honored with the "Lombardi Award of Excellence" from the Vince Lombardi Cancer Foundation. The award was created to honor the football coach's legacy, and is awarded annually to an individual who exemplifies his spirit. He was also inducted into Omicron Delta Kappa, the National Leadership Honor Society, in 1992 at Ferris State University. On May 28, 2003, President George W. Bush established the Bob Hope American Patriot Award.

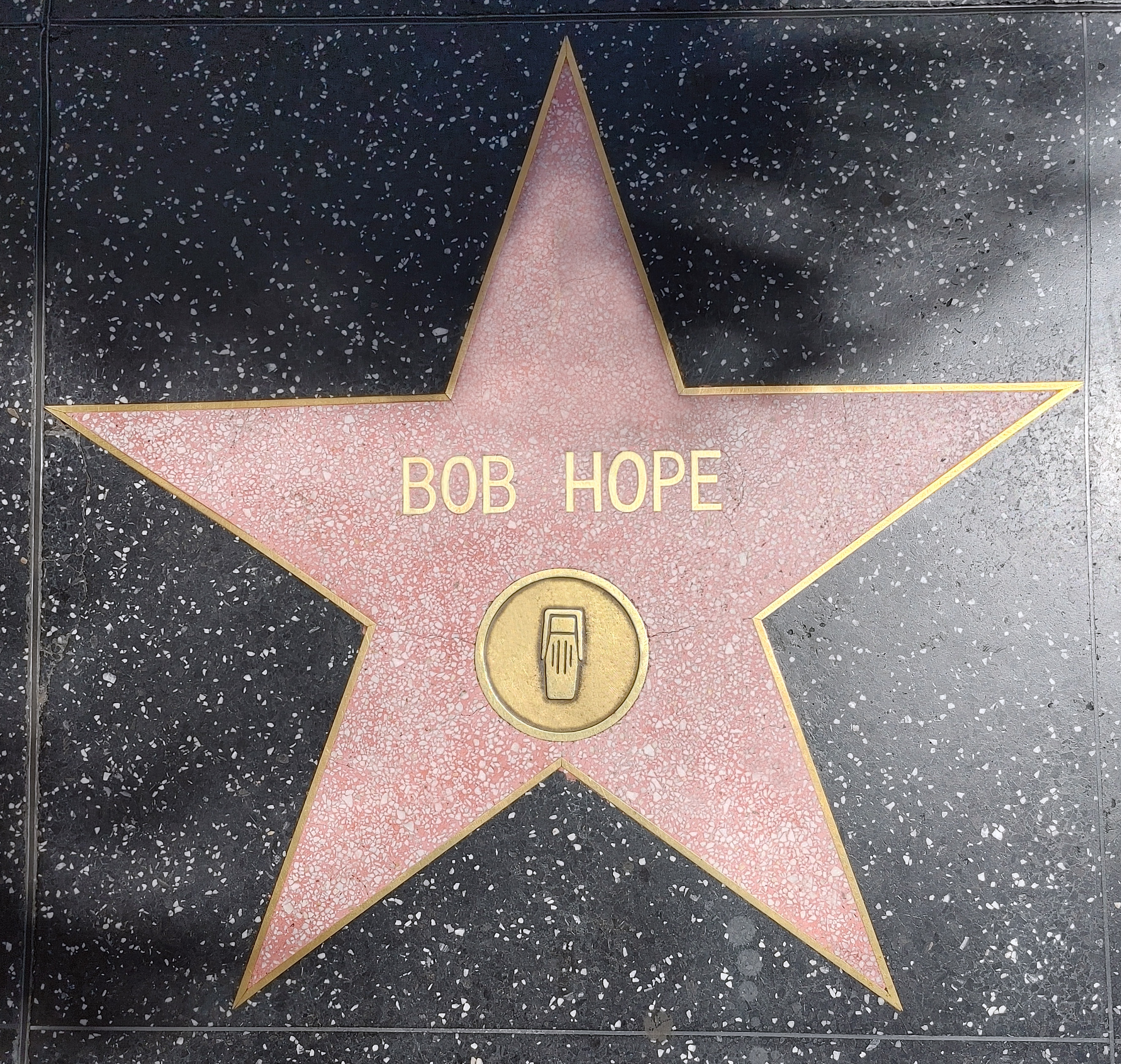
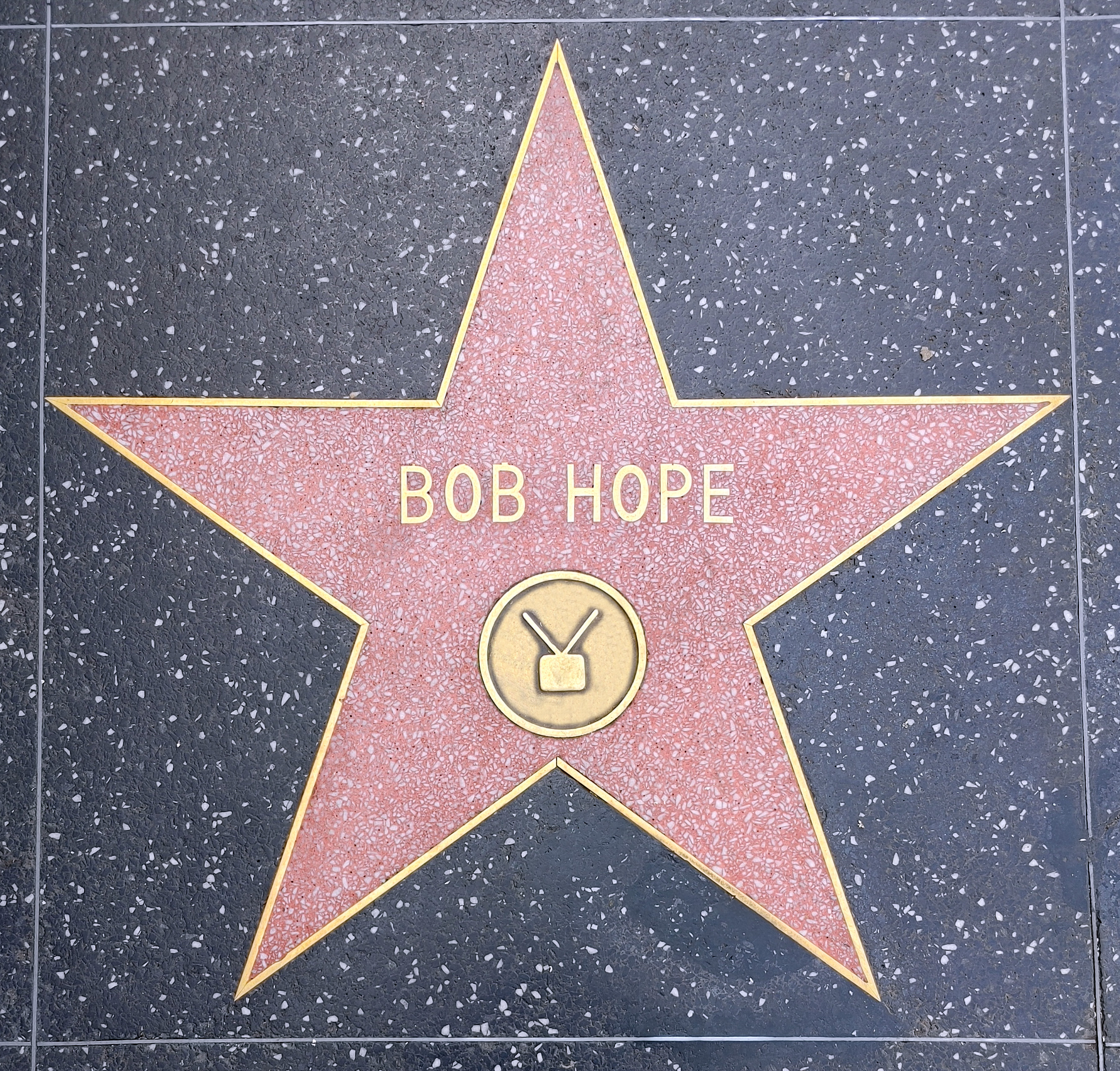
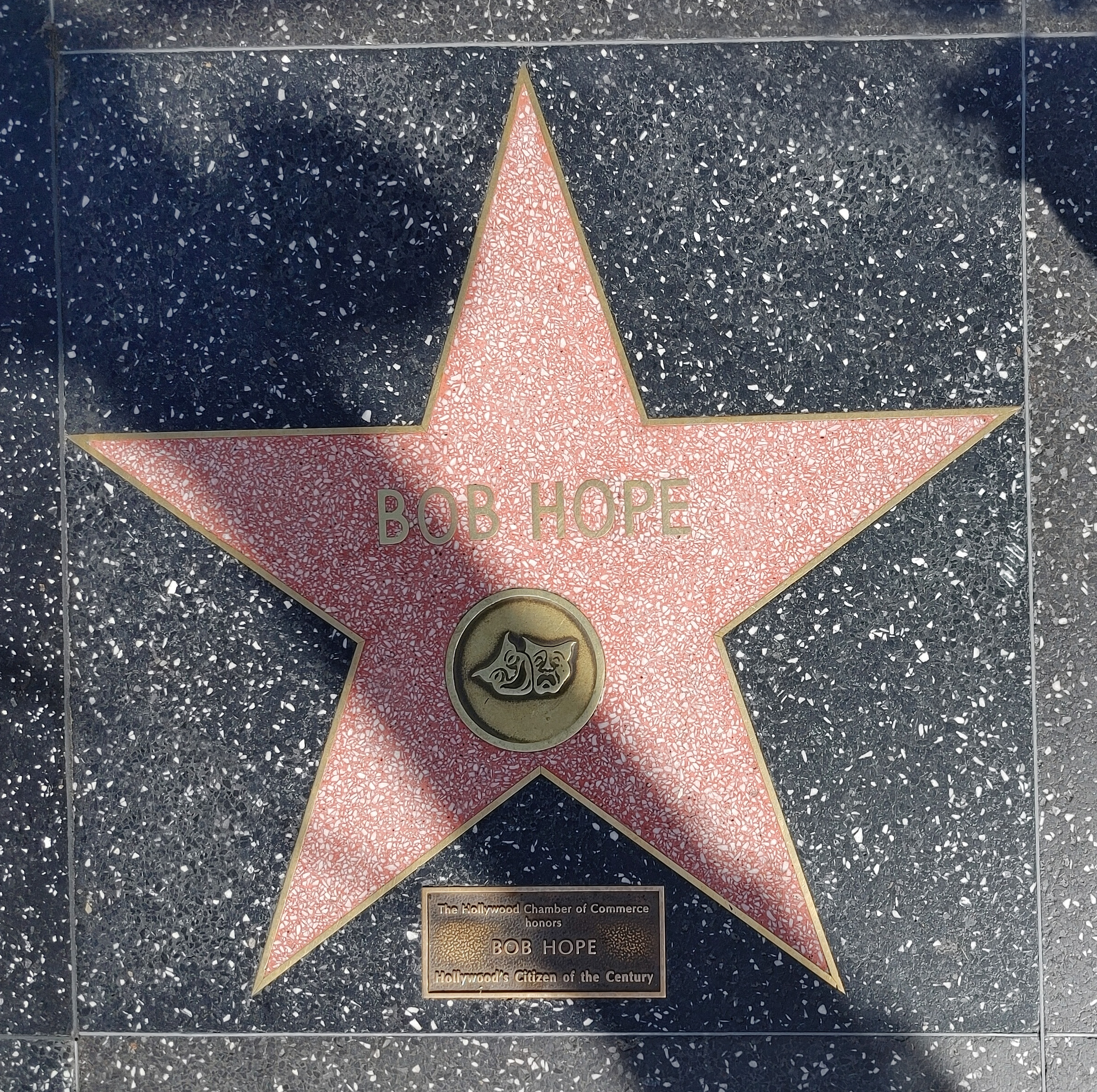
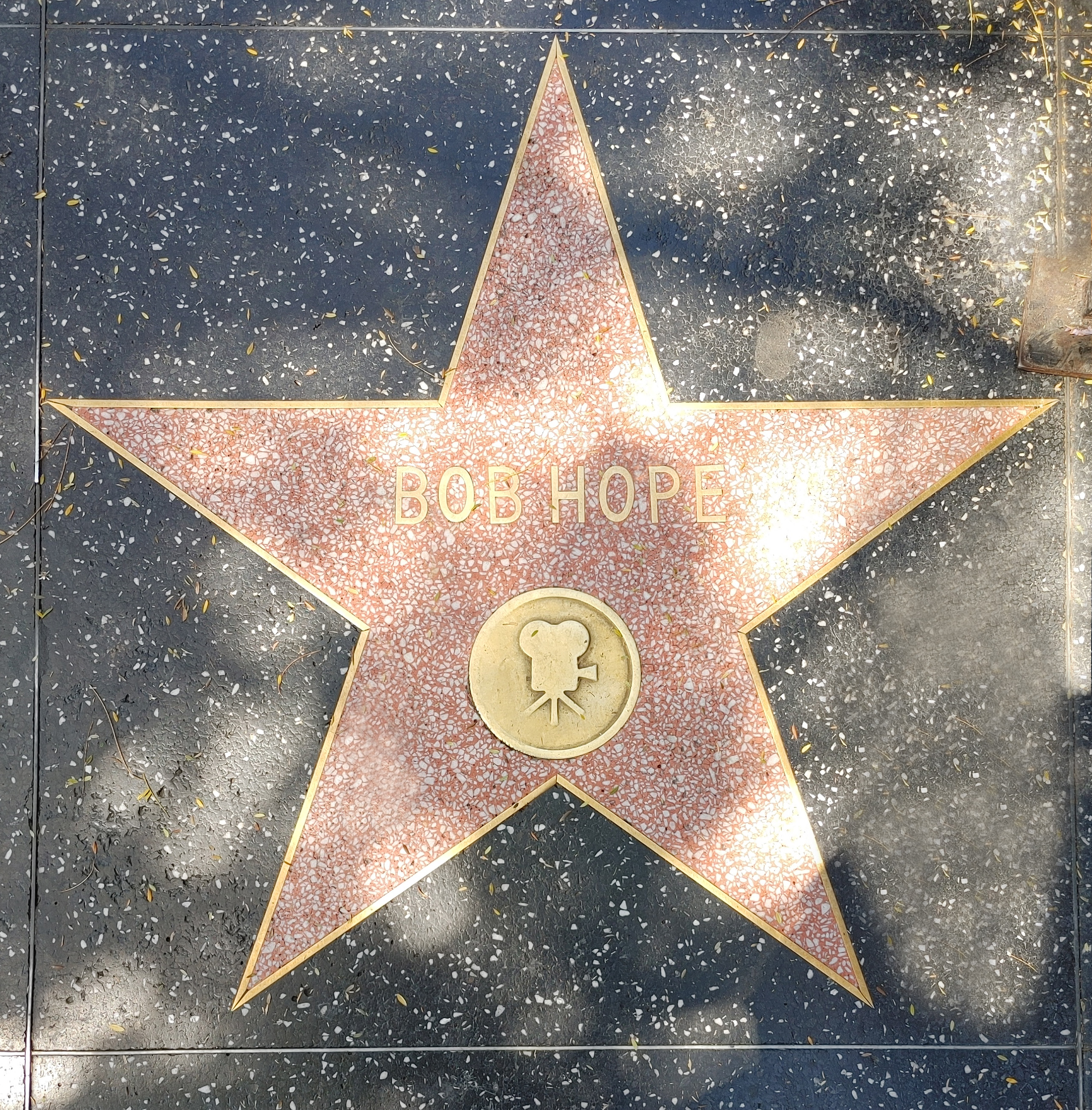
Bob Hope's four stars for Radio broadcasting, Television, Live performance, and Motion pictures on Hollywood Walk of Fame in Los Angeles

Academy Awards Although he was never nominated for a competitive Oscar, Hope was given five honorary awards by the Academy of Motion Picture Arts and Sciences:

- 13th Academy Awards (1940): Special Award in recognition of his unselfish services to the motion picture industry
- 17th Academy Awards (1944): Special Award for his many services to the academy
- 25th Academy Awards (1952): Honorary Award for his contribution to the laughter of the world, his service to the motion picture industry, and his devotion to the American premise
- 32nd Academy Awards (1959): Jean Hersholt Humanitarian Award
- 38th Academy Awards (1965): Honorary Award: first Academy Gold Medal for unique and distinguished service to the industry and the academy

== Personal life ==
=== Marriage and relationships ===
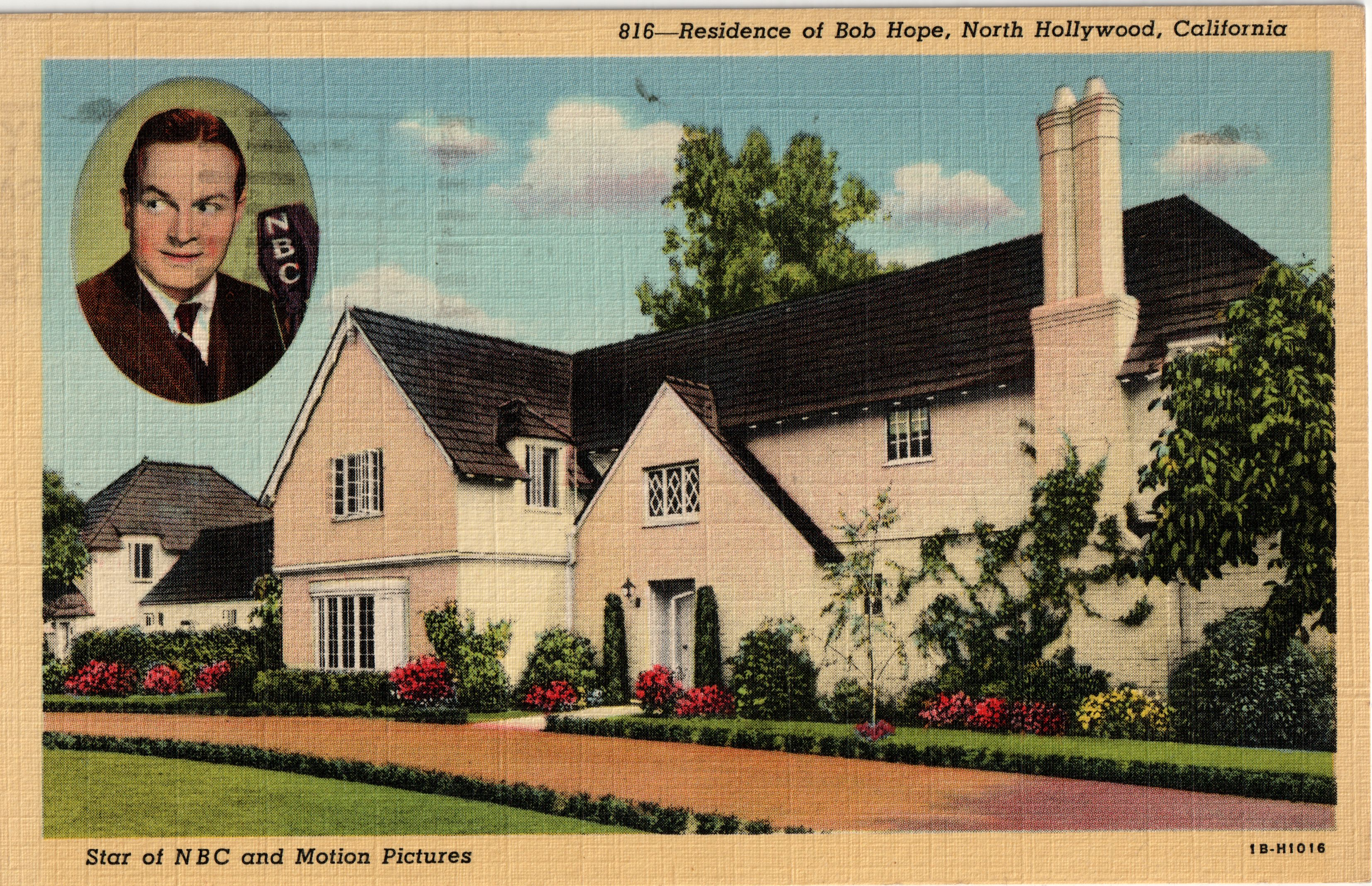
Residence of Bob Hope, North Hollywood, California

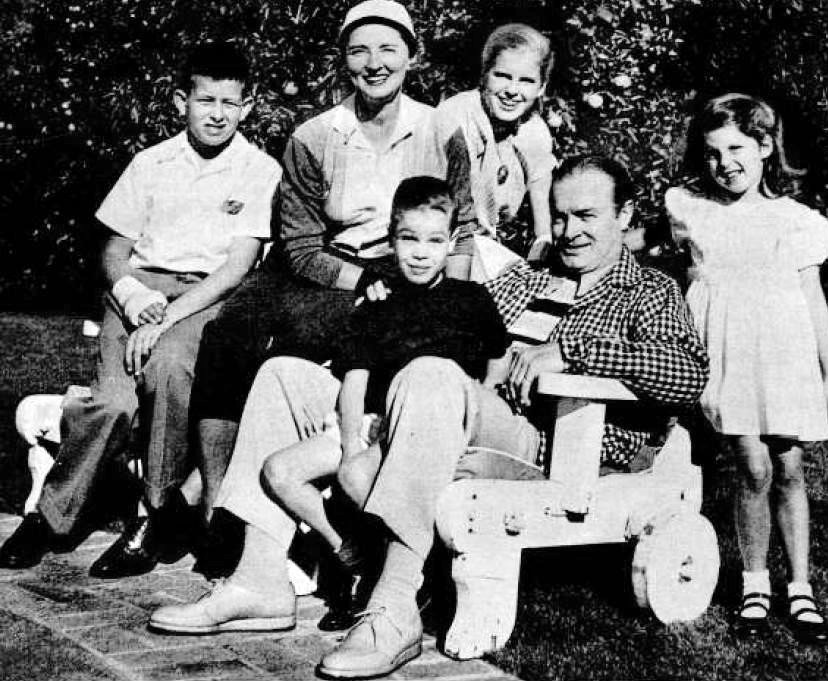
The Hope family; Back, from left: Tony, Dolores, and Linda; Front, from left: Kelly, Bob, and Nora

Hope was briefly married to vaudeville partner Grace Louise Troxell (1912–1992), a secretary from Chicago, Illinois. They were married on January 25, 1933, in Erie, Pennsylvania. They divorced in November 1934.

The couple had shared headliner status with Joe Howard at the Palace Theatre in April 1931, performing "Keep Smiling" and the "Antics of 1931". They worked together at the RKO Albee, performing the "Antics of 1933" along with Ann Gillens and Johnny Peters in June of that year. The following month, singer Dolores Reade joined Hope's vaudeville troupe and was performing with him at Loew's Metropolitan Theater. She was described as a "former Ziegfeld beauty and one of society's favorite nightclub entertainers, having appeared at many private social functions at New York, Palm Beach, and Southampton".

His marriage to Reade was fraught with ambiguities. As Richard Zoglin wrote in his 2014 biography Hope: Entertainer of the Century,

Bob and Dolores always claimed that they married in February 1934 in Erie, Pennsylvania. But at that time, he was secretly married to his vaudeville partner Louise Troxell, after three years together on and off. I found divorce papers for Bob and Louise dated November 1934, so either Bob Hope was a bigamist, or he lied about marrying Dolores in February that year. He had actually married Louise in January 1933 in Erie when they were traveling on the vaudeville circuit. When he claimed he had married Dolores in Erie he was miles away in New York, on Broadway. More intriguing, there is no record anywhere of his marriage to Dolores, if it happened. And there are no wedding photos, either. But he never forgot Louise and quietly sent her money in her later years.

Dolores had been one of Hope's co-stars on Broadway in Roberta. The couple adopted four children: Linda (in 1939), Anthony "Tony" (1940–2004), Kelly (1946), and Eleanora "Nora" (1946). Bob and Dolores were also the legal guardians of Tracey, the youngest daughter of famous New York City bar owner Bernard "Toots" Shor and his wife, Marion "Baby" Shor. In 1935, the couple lived in Manhattan. In 1937, they moved to 10346 Moorpark Street in the Toluca Lake neighborhood of Los Angeles, where they would reside until their respective deaths.

Hope had a reputation as a womanizer and continued to see other women throughout his marriage. Zoglin wrote that Hope had several "affairs with chorus girls, beauty queens, singers and showbiz wannabes". Women who have claimed to have been romantically linked to Hope include Barbara Payton, Marilyn Maxwell, and Rosemarie Frankland.

=== Politics and beliefs ===
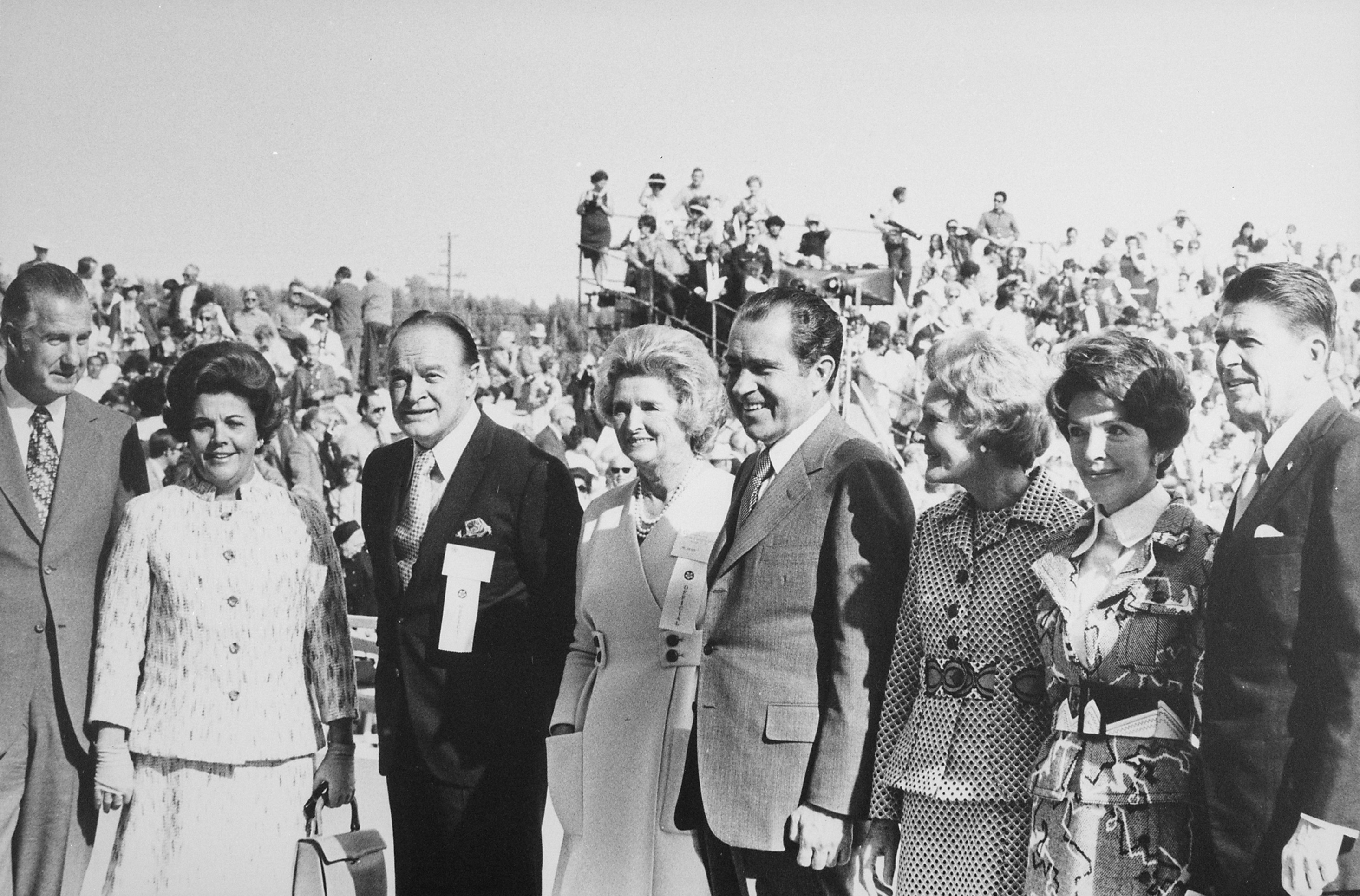
From left to right: Spiro and Judy Agnew, Bob and Dolores Hope, Richard and Pat Nixon, Nancy and Ronald Reagan during a campaign stop for the Nixon-Agnew ticket in California, 1971

Hope had extensive relationships with US Presidents from Franklin D. Roosevelt to Bill Clinton and often made topical political jokes in his comedic material. He hosted the White House Correspondents Dinner three times in 1944, 1953, and 1976. Hope was supportive politically of Republican Presidents such as Richard Nixon and Ronald Reagan.

Hope's biographer Richard Zoglin in an interview with NPR stated that "Bob Hope was the establishment. Bob Hope was friends with Nixon. Bob Hope was speaking in favor of the Vietnam War. Bob Hope was expressing that kind of backward, suburban, WASP view of minorities, homosexuals, the women's movement." Hope's beliefs and attitudes on social issues are a part of the plot of the 2020 film Misbehaviour, which follows the Women's Liberation protests at the Miss World 1970 competition that Hope hosted; Greg Kinnear plays Hope.

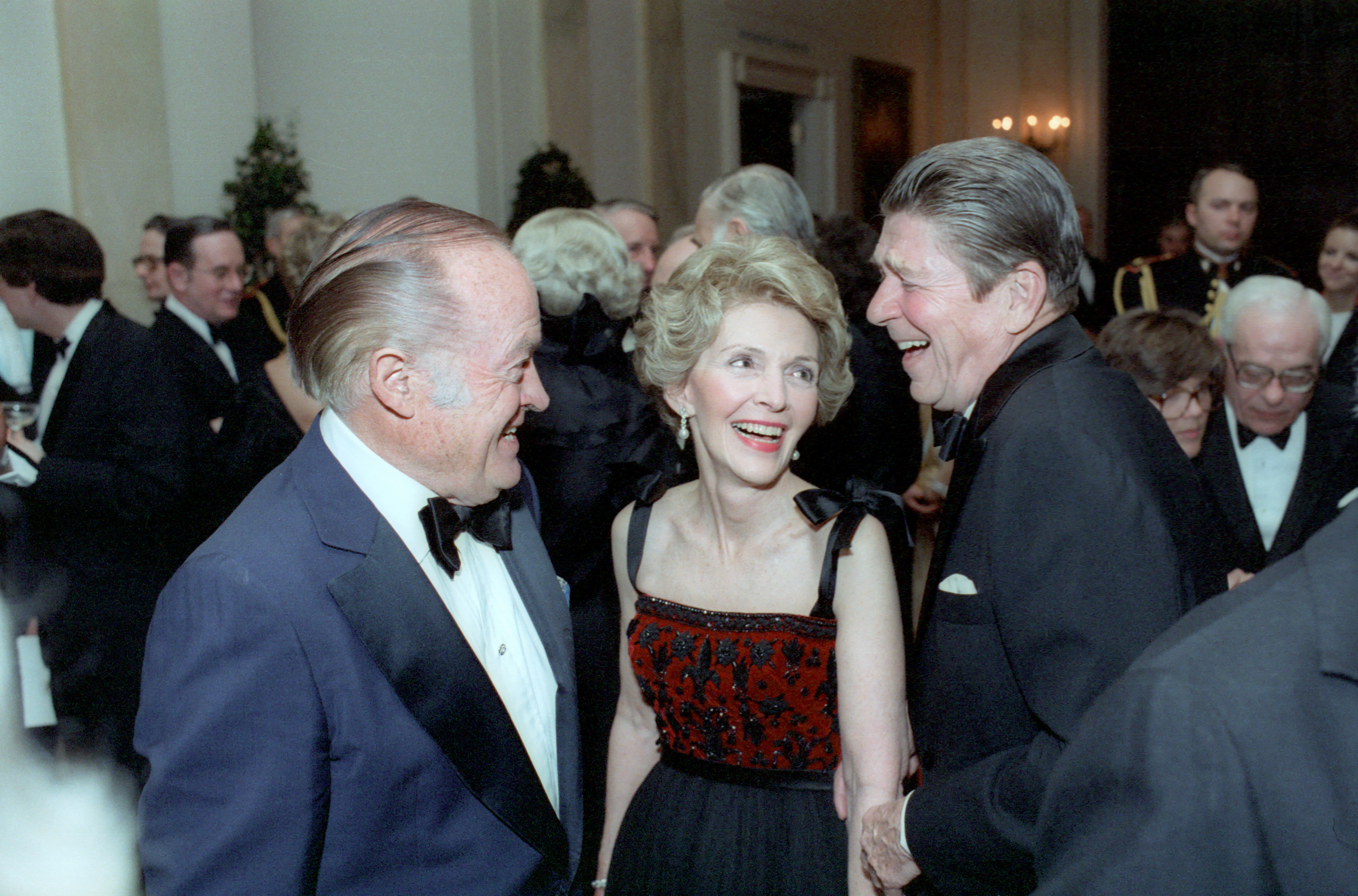
Hope (left) with Nancy Reagan and President Ronald Reagan in 1981

After the shootings of president Ronald Reagan and Pope John Paul II in 1981, Hope advocated for gun control. Hope told Tom Shales of The Washington Post, "I'm for gun registration. I don't think any jerk that's coked up or anything should be allowed to walk in a store and buy a gun and turn around and shoot 19 people, you know? ... And what the hell, hunters can have their guns, they're registered. I've got a gun in each house for a warning thing; that can be registered ... They gotta tell me what's wrong with having them registered. That's all I wanna hear." When Hope shared these views during an ABC Radio interview, he quickly realized the repercussions. Vice President George H. W. Bush, who was visiting West Point the same day Hope taped a special there, had declined to meet with him. Additionally, at a luncheon in Washington that same week, Hope had planned to sit with Nancy Reagan, but she canceled at the last minute.

Hope's views on the gay community also evolved. At the height of Anita Bryant's campaign to reverse the progress of gay rights and anti-discrimination legislation in Florida in 1977, he, as well as many other comedians, ridiculed her in their routines, but also expressed his disagreement with Bryant: "We're all entitled to our own sexual habits [and] I believe what these people do behind closed doors is their business ... Most of us today are aware of Anita Bryant's stand [but] I still think jobs should be based on talent, not whether a person is homosexual or heterosexual." However, Texaco and Chrysler, sponsors for many of his TV specials, asked him to refrain from making further jokes about the subject. In February 1986, he joined Elizabeth Taylor, to cohost a benefit for American Foundation for AIDS Research and the Arizona AIDS Fund Trust in Scottsdale, AZ. Though expressing these supportive views, he occasionally used epithets and told jokes at the expense of the community yet showed remorse when called on it. During a performance at Liberty Weekend in 1986, Hope remarked, "I just heard that the Statue of Liberty has AIDS, but she doesn't know if she got it from the mouth of the Hudson or the Staten Island Ferry." Two months later, Hope took responsibility for telling the joke and apologized, explaining that he overheard the joke and thought it was funny. When Hope used the word "fag" on a 1988 Tonight Show appearance, GLAAD asked for a statement apologizing for the slur. He agreed to tape a public service announcement opposing "bigotry" on their behalf.

=== Philanthropy ===
Hope, who suffered from vision problems for much of his adult life, served as an active honorary chairman on the board of Fight for Sight, a nonprofit organization in the United States which funds medical research in vision and ophthalmology. He hosted its Lights On telecast in 1960 and donated $100,000 ($1.04M in 2024) to establish the Bob Hope Fight for Sight Fund. Hope recruited numerous top celebrities for the annual "Lights On" fundraiser. As an example, he hosted boxing champion Joe Frazier, actress Yvonne De Carlo, and singer-actor Sergio Franchi as headliners for the April 25, 1971, show at Philharmonic Hall in Milwaukee.

=== Estate ===
Hope settled into a home custom built for him in 1939 on an 87,000-square-foot (8,083 m^{2}) lot in the Toluca Lake section of Burbank in the San Fernando Valley. It was put on the market in late 2012.

The Hope Residence is a 23,366-square-foot (2,171 m^{2}) modernist home in Palm Springs, built to resemble a volcano, that was designed in 1973 by John Lautner. The home is located above the city, with panoramic views of the Coachella Valley and the San Jacinto Mountains. It was put on the market for the first time in February 2013 with an asking price of $50 million, and sold to investor Ron Burkle for just $13 million in November 2016.

=== Advanced age and death ===
At the age of 93, seven years before his death, Hope converted to Catholicism, his wife's faith.

In July 1997 at age 94, he attended the funeral of James Stewart, where many pointed out his frail appearance. At the age of 95, Hope made an appearance at the 50th anniversary of the Primetime Emmy Awards with Milton Berle and Sid Caesar. Contemporaries Fay Wray and Gloria Stuart were also present. Two years later, he was present at the opening of the Bob Hope Gallery of American Entertainment at the Library of Congress. The Library of Congress has presented two major exhibitions about Hope's life: "Hope for America: Performers, Politics and Pop Culture" and "Bob Hope and American Variety". He last made an appearance at the Hope Classic in 2000, where he hugged Swedish golfer Jesper Parnevik.

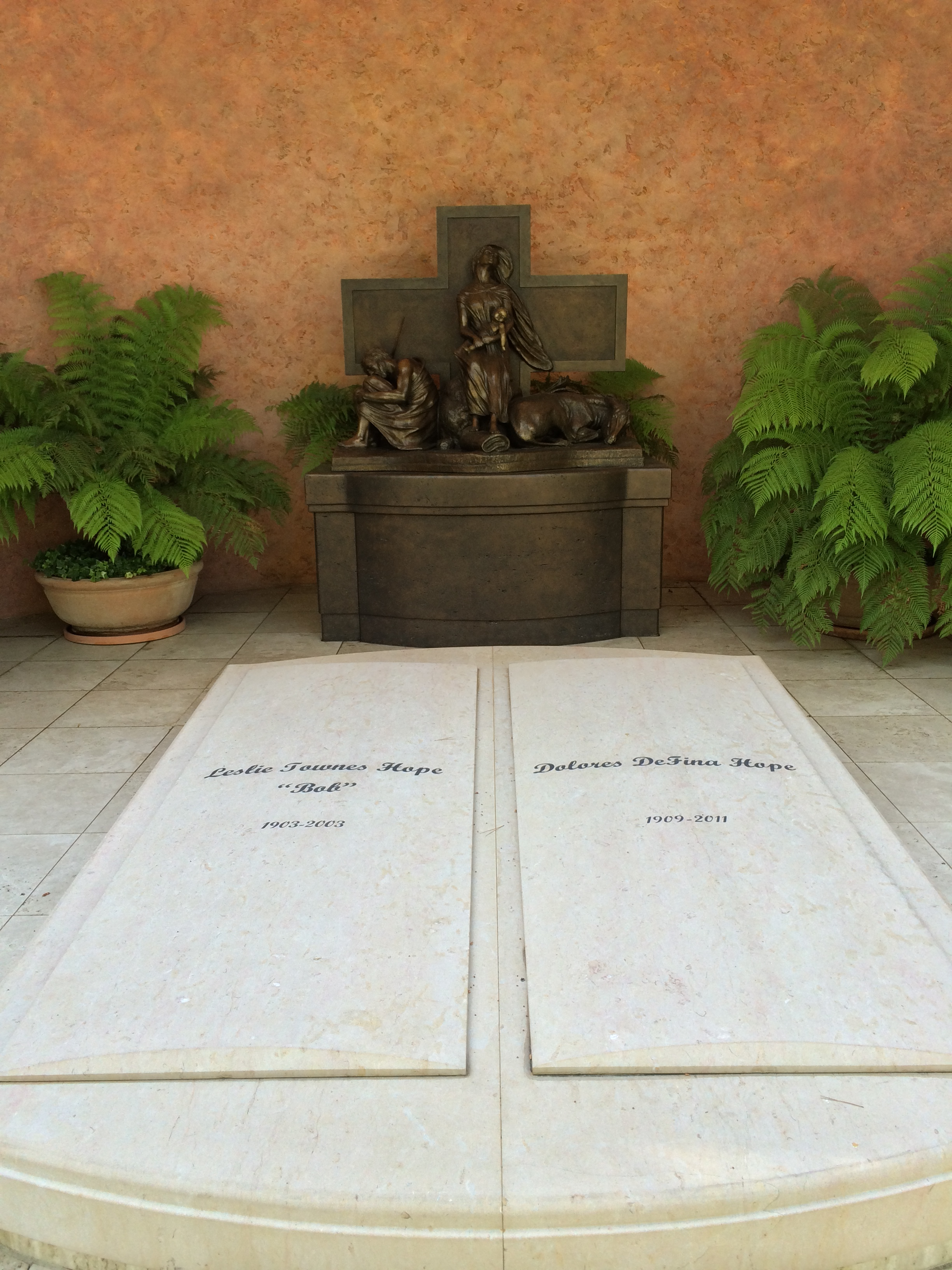
Graves of Bob and Dolores Hope, on the grounds of the Mission San Fernando Rey de España

In 1998, five years before his death, a prepared obituary written by the Associated Press was inadvertently released, resulting in Hope's death being announced on the floor of the U.S. House of Representatives. However, aside from increasing frailty, Hope remained in relatively good health until late in his old age. In June 2000 at age 97, he spent nearly a week in a California hospital being treated for gastrointestinal bleeding. In August 2001 at age 98, he spent close to two weeks in a hospital recovering from pneumonia.

Hope celebrated his 100th birthday on May 29, 2003. To mark this event, the intersection of Hollywood and Vine in Los Angeles was named "Bob Hope Square" and his centennial was declared "Bob Hope Day" in 35 states. Even at 100, Hope maintained his self-deprecating sense of humor, quipping, "I'm so old, they've canceled my blood type."

On July 27, 2003, Hope died of pneumonia at his home in Toluca Lake, California. His grandson Zach Hope told Soledad O'Brien in an interview that, when asked at the end of his life where he wished to be buried, he said, "Surprise me". His remains were temporarily placed in a mausoleum vault at the San Fernando Mission Cemetery before the construction of the Bob Hope Memorial Garden at the San Fernando Mission, located next door to the cemetery, in Los Angeles. Dolores died in 2011, aged 102. After his death, newspaper cartoonists worldwide paid tribute to his work for the USO, and some featured drawings of Bing Crosby, who had died in 1977, welcoming Hope to Heaven.

== Discography ==
Singles

Year	Single	US Pop Chart
1936	"De-Lovely" (eponym of 2004 film biography of Cole Porter)	--
1938	"Thanks for the Memory" (Oscar for Best Original Song) (Bob Hope and Shirley Ross)	--
1939	"Two Sleepy People" (B-side) (Bob Hope and Shirley Ross)	15
1945	"(We're Off on the) Road to Morocco" (Bing Crosby and Bob Hope)	21
1948	"Buttons and Bows" (Oscar for Best Original Song)	--
1950	"Blind Date" (Margaret Whiting and Bob Hope)	16
1951	"Silver Bells (Christmas song)	--

== See also ==
- Bob Hope bibliography
- Bob Hope television specials
