= Bob Hope boxing record =

Boxing record of the actor and comedian

British-born American actor and comedian Bob Hope had a brief boxing career (in 1919) under the name Packy East (named after the popular boxer Packey McFarland). His best result was making it to the finals of the Ohio novice championship in 1919. Hope participated in a few staged bouts later in life.

== Boxing record ==
Result	Record	Opponent	Method	Date	Round	Time	Event	Location	Notes
N/A		(United States) Mike Carrigan (Wisniewski)	result unavailable	1919				Moose Hall, Cleveland, Ohio	
Win	1–0–0	(United States) Unknown	KO	1919	1		Ohio State Boxing Amateurs (Tournament)	Moose Hall, Cleveland, Ohio	Opening match (Lightweight Division) Hope fought as Packy East. Source: New York Herald Tribune, July 10, 1938.
Win	2–0–0	(United States) Joe E. Morgan	Default (Hope's opponent failed to show for bout.)	July 1, 1919			Ohio State Boxing Amateurs (Tournament)	Moose Hall, Cleveland, Ohio	Semi-Finals (Lightweight Division) Hope fought as Packy East.
Win	3–0–0	(United States) Aldo Sperati		July 3, 1919			Ohio State Boxing Amateurs (Tournament)	Moose Hall, Cleveland, Ohio	Semi-Finals (Lightweight Division) Hope fought as Packy East.
Win	4–0–0	(United States) Shorty Sedwich	KO	July 4, 1919	1		Ohio State Boxing Amateurs (Tournament)	Moose Hall, Cleveland, Ohio	Semi-Finals (Lightweight Division) Hope fought as Packy East.
Loss	4–1–0	(United States) Happy Walsh	KO	1919			Ohio State Boxing Amateurs (Tournament)	Moose Hall, Cleveland, Ohio	Finals (Lightweight Division) Hope fought as Packy East. Source: The Plain Dealer, August 17, 1984.
Win	5–1–0	(United States) Jack Dempsey	KO	April 10, 1948	1	0:14	Charity match for the US Airforce	Madison Square Garden, New York	Clearly a "rigged" bout. Former heavyweight champ Dempsey is "KO'd" in 14 seconds.
No contest	5–1–0–1	(United States) Rocky Marciano	No contest	1968	1		"Salute To The USO"	Madison Square Garden, New York	Charity match. Bing Crosby was referee. 19,000 fans attended. (RING Magazine, May 1968, page 33)
N/A	5–1–0–1	(United States) Sugar Ray Robinson	Result Unknown	April 21, 1972			Sugar Ray Youth Foundation	North Hollywood, Los Angeles, California	Charity match for the Sugar Ray (Robinson) Youth Foundation
