= Richard Zoglin =

American journalist and author

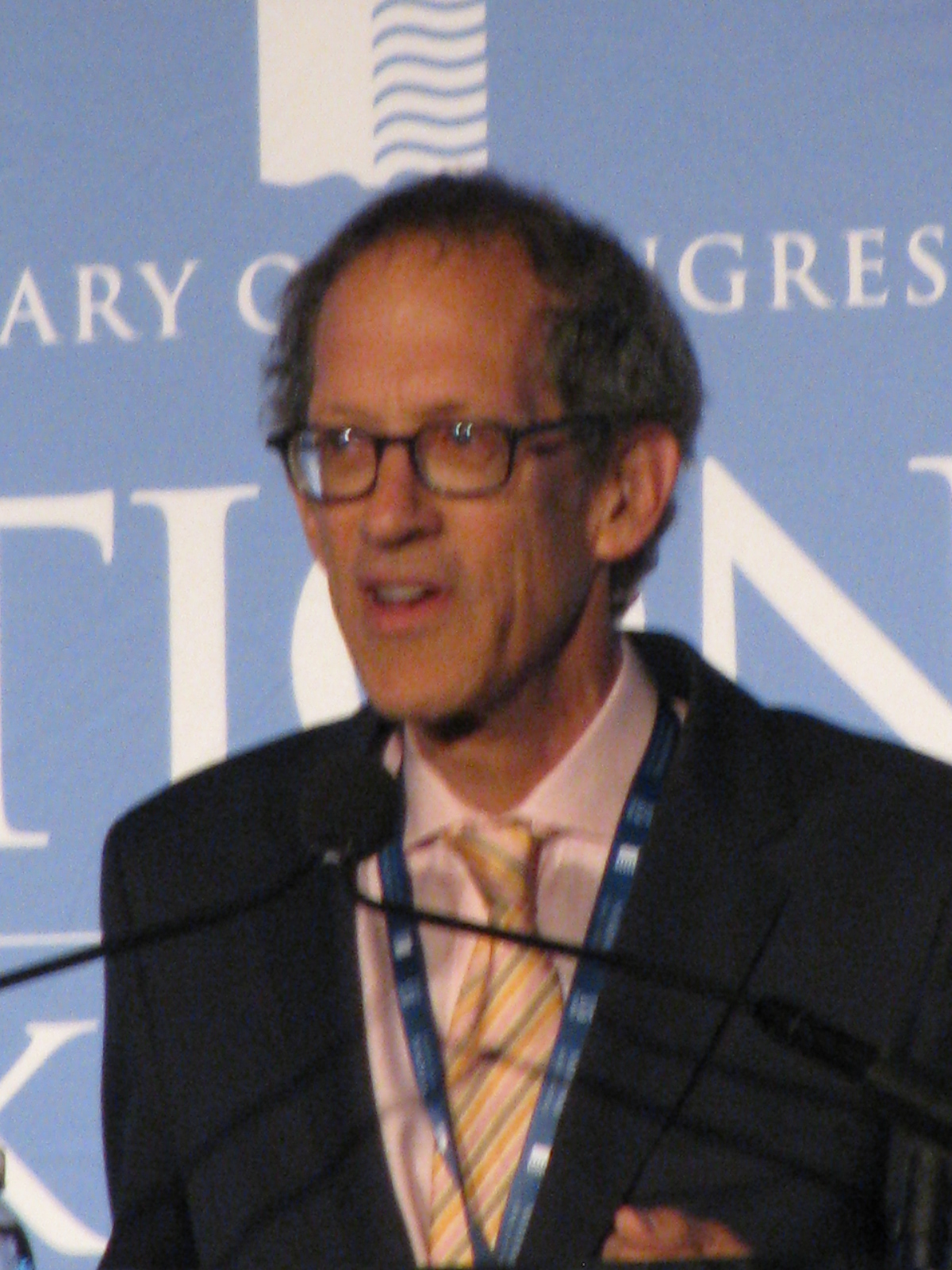
- Born: August 8, 1948 (age 78)
- Education: University of California, Berkeley
- Occupations: Journalist, author
- Spouse: Charla Krupp (m. 1992; died 2012)
- Writing career
- Genre: non-fiction
- Notable awards: Samuel Johnson Prize
- Website: richardzoglin.com

Richard Zoglin (born August 8, 1948) is an American journalist and author.

== Career ==
Zoglin wrote about entertainment for Time for over 20 years. He is the author of Hope: Entertainer of the Century, a 2014 biography of comedian Bob Hope.

In 2008, he published Comedy at the Edge: How Stand-up in the 1970s Changed America, describing Lenny Bruce and the influence of the generation of stand-ups who followed him and elaborated on his style.

== Education ==
Zoglin obtained a bachelor's degree from the University of California, Berkeley, where he later received his master's degree in journalism.

== Personal life ==
Zoglin was married to Charla Krupp on August 1, 1992, until her death from breast cancer on January 23, 2012. Charla Zoglin was an entertainment editor for Glamour. Zoglin's father was the head of Zoglin Brothers Builders in Kansas City.

== Works ==
- Comedy at the Edge: How Stand-up in the 1970s Changed America. Bloomsbury USA. February 3, 2009. ISBN 978-1-58234-625-0.
- Hope: Entertainer of the Century. Simon & Schuster. November 4, 2014. ISBN 978-1-4391-4858-7.
- Elvis in Vegas: How the King Reinvented the Las Vegas Show
