= 1968 Republican Party vice presidential candidate selection =

1968 Republican vice presidential nomination
- August 8, 1968
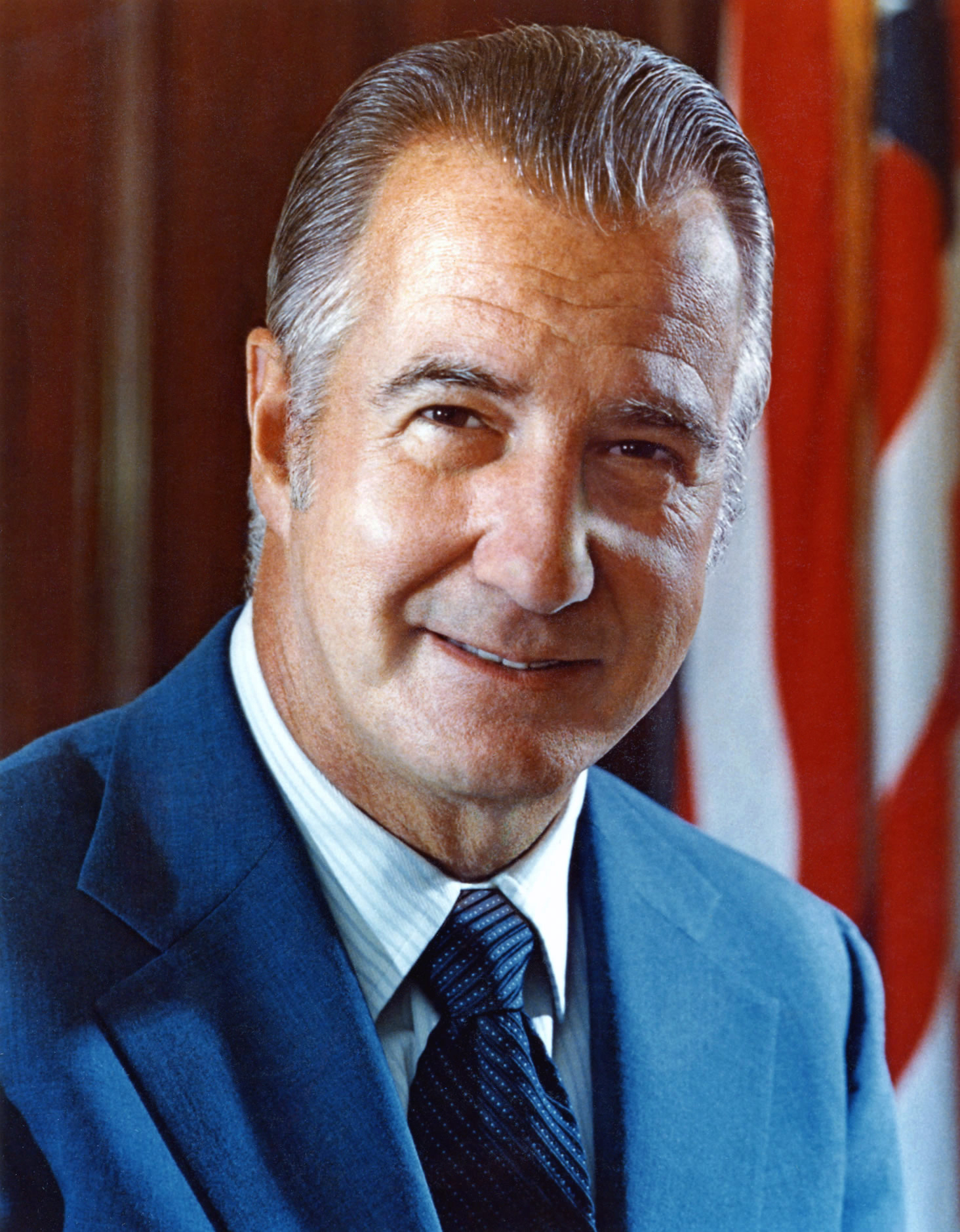
Nominee	Spiro Agnew
Home state	Maryland
Previous Vice Presidential nominee
William E. Miller
Vice Presidential nominee
Spiro Agnew

This article lists those who were potential candidates for the Republican nomination for Vice President of the United States in the 1968 election. After winning the Republican presidential nomination at the 1968 Republican National Convention, former Vice President Richard Nixon convened a series of meetings with close advisers and party leaders such as Strom Thurmond in order to choose his running mate. Nixon ultimately asked the convention to nominate Maryland Governor Spiro Agnew as his running mate. By a large margin, Agnew won the vice presidential nomination on the first ballot over Michigan Governor George W. Romney, who was supported by a faction of liberal Republicans. Nixon chose Agnew because he wanted a centrist who was broadly acceptable to the party, had experience with domestic issues, and appealed to Southern voters (to counter the third party candidacy of former Alabama Governor George Wallace). The Nixon–Agnew ticket defeated the Humphrey–Muskie ticket, and also won re-election in 1972, defeating the McGovern–Shriver ticket. However, Agnew was forced to resign as vice president in 1973 due to a controversy regarding his personal taxes.

Despite being his running mate in 1960, Henry Cabot Lodge Jr. was not considered as a potential running mate for Nixon in 1968.

== Potential running mates ==
=== Finalists ===
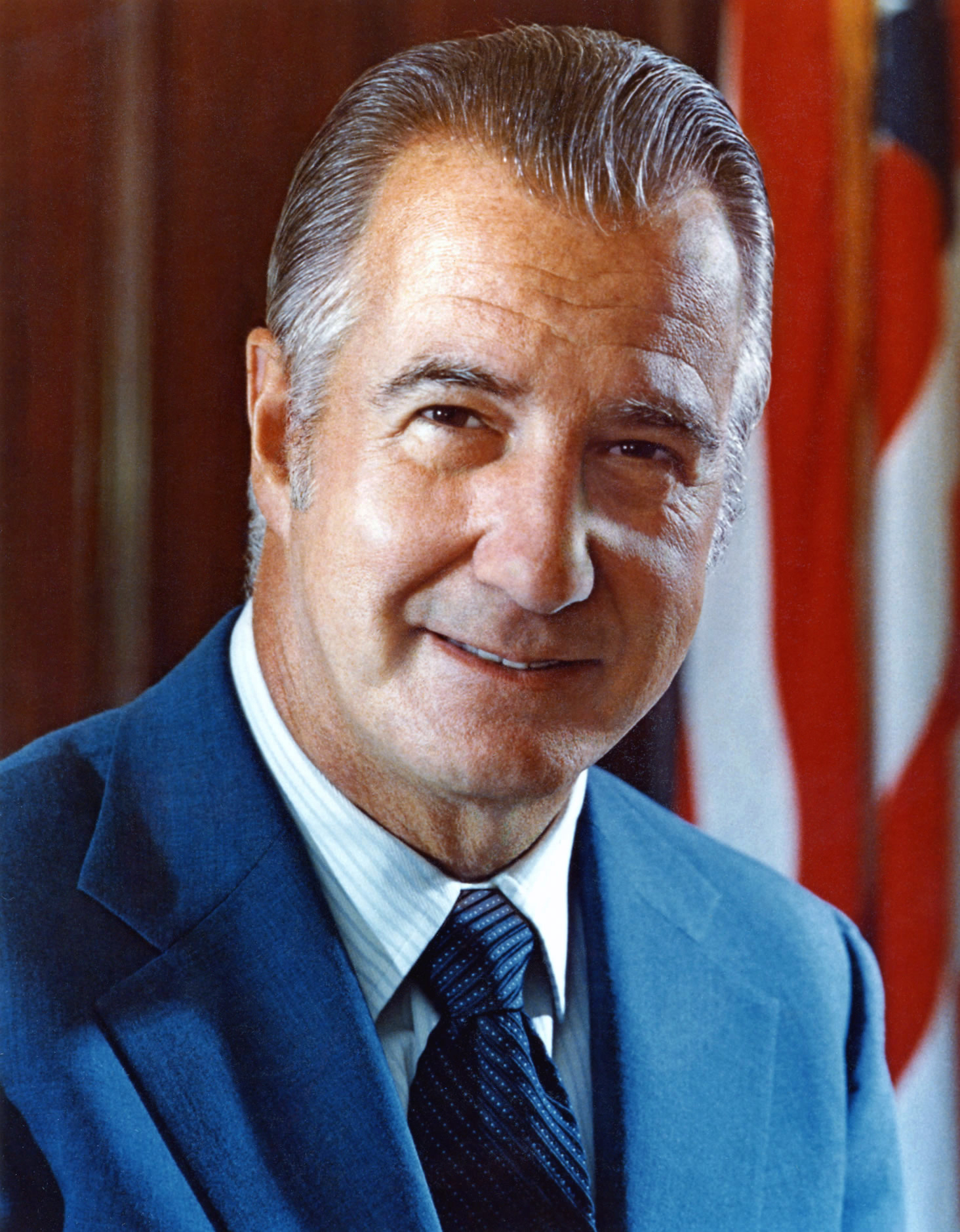
Governor
Spiro Agnew
of Maryland
(1967–1969)

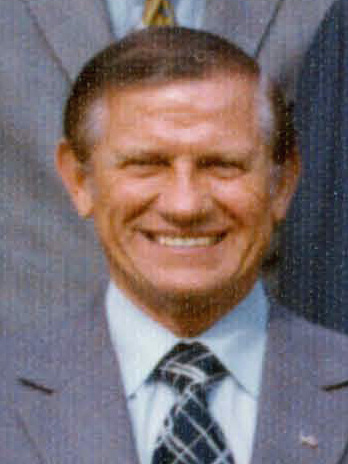
Governor
John A. Volpe
of Massachusetts
(1961–1963; 1965–1969)

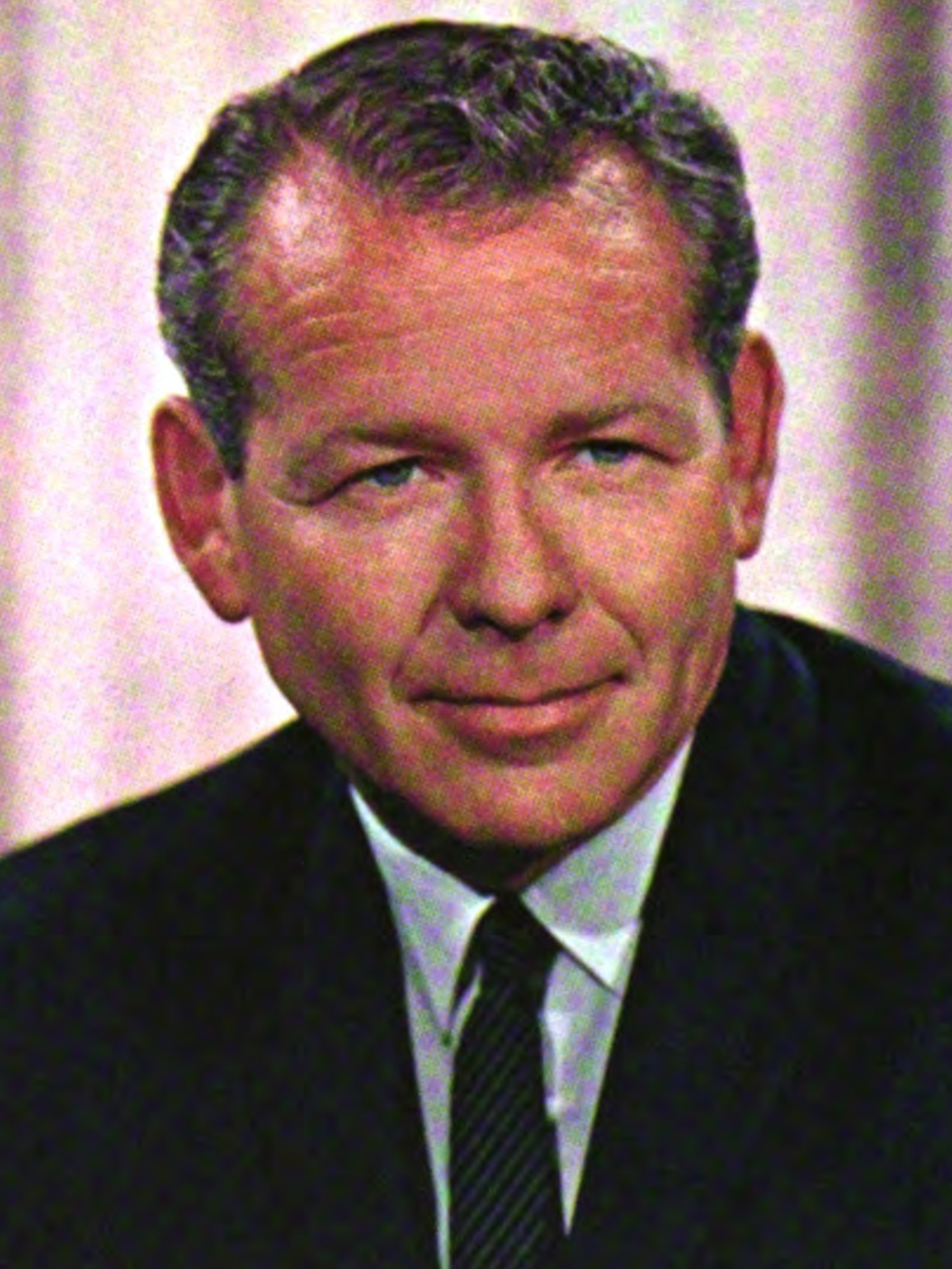
Lieutenant Governor
Robert Finch
of California
(1967–1969)

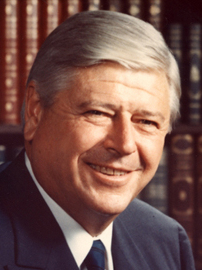
Representative
Rogers Morton
from Maryland
(1963–1971)

=== Potential ===
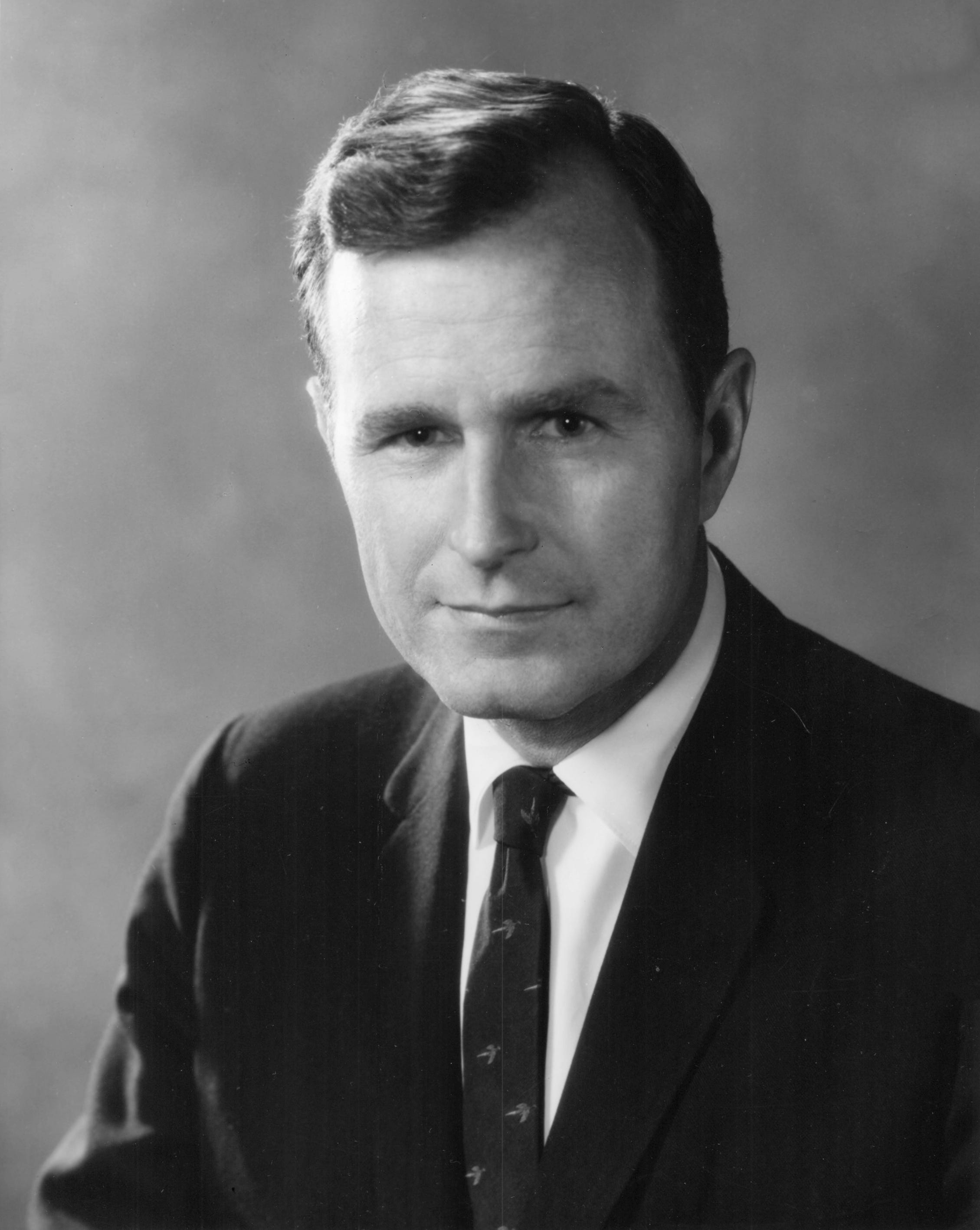
Representative
George H. W. Bush
from Texas
(1967–1971)

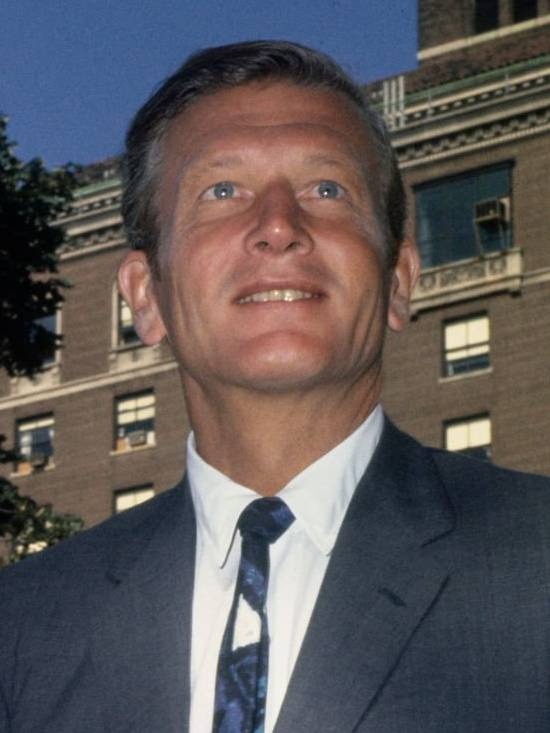
Mayor
John Lindsay
from New York
(1966–1973)

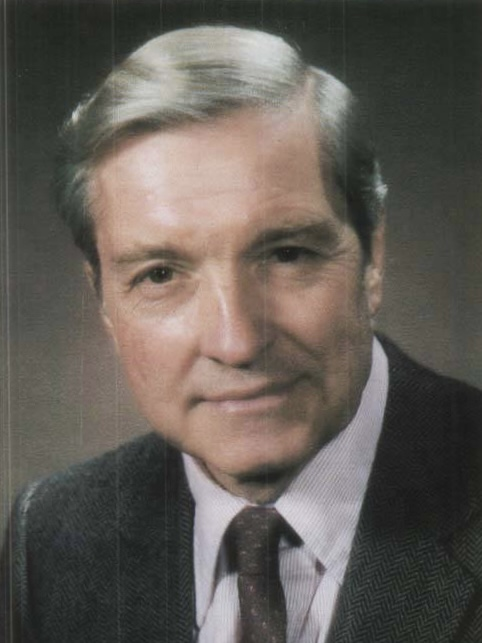
Senator
Charles H. Percy
from Illinois
(1967–1985)

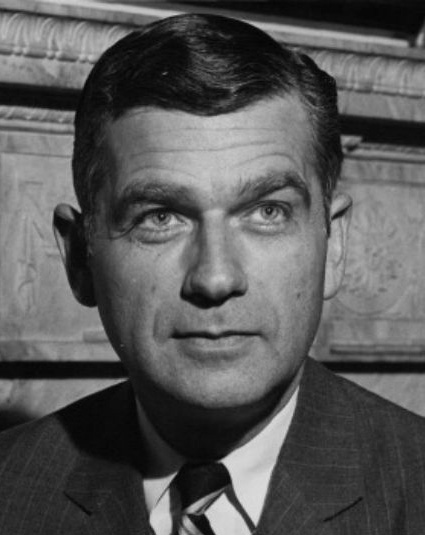
Senator
Mark Hatfield
from Oregon
(1967–1997)

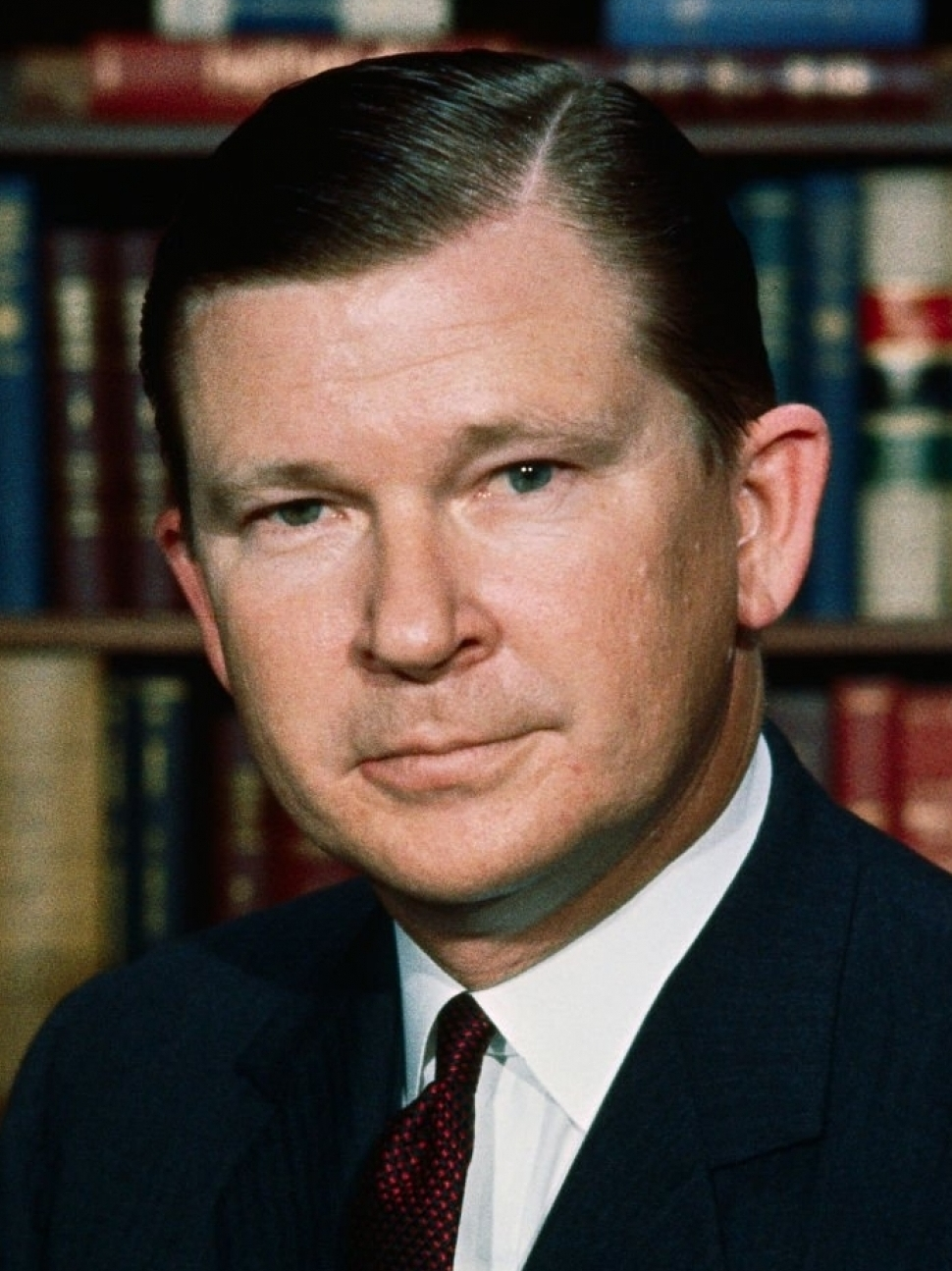
Senator
John Tower
from Texas
(1961–1985)

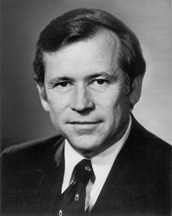
Senator
Howard Baker
from Tennessee
(1967–1985)

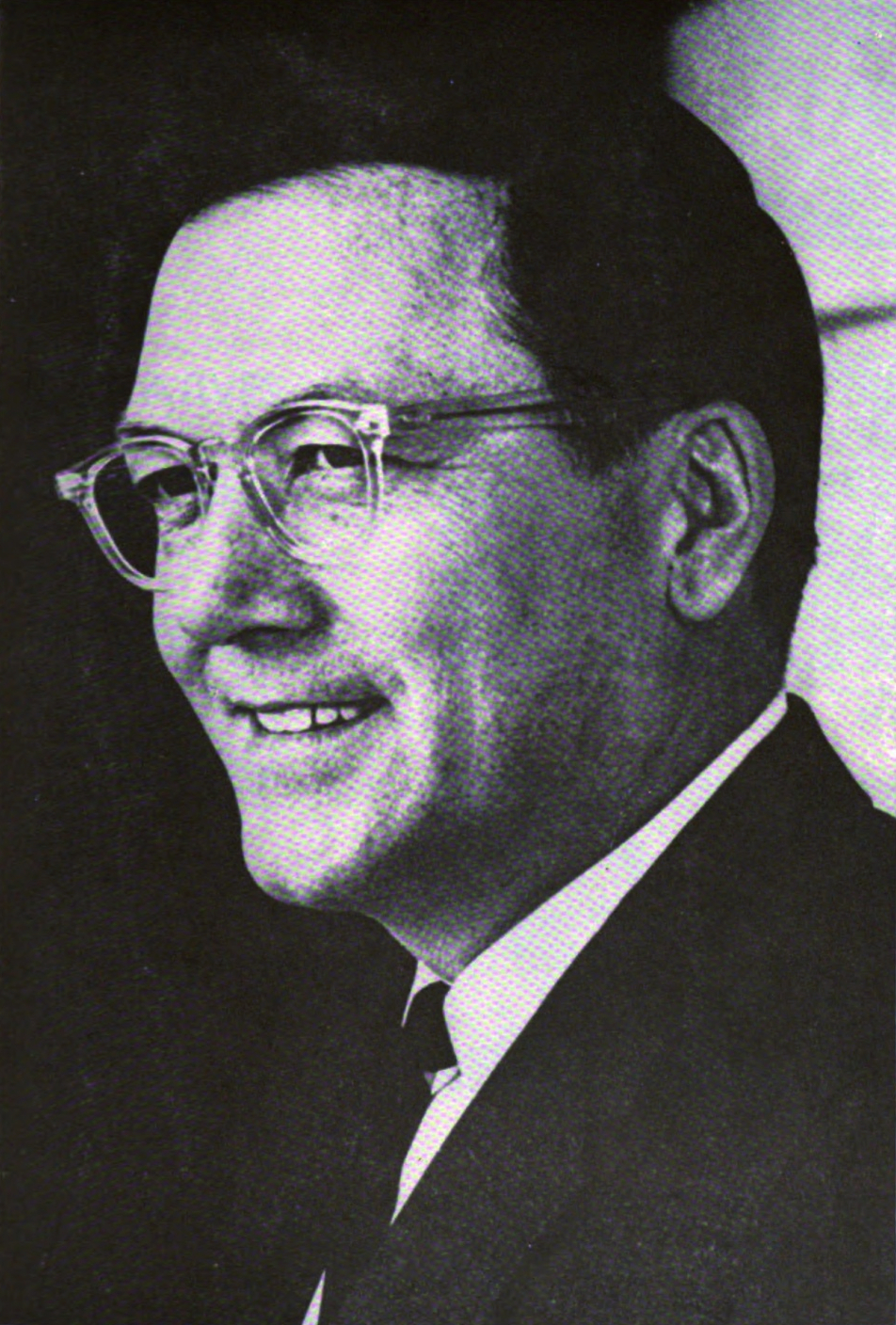
Senator
Robert P. Griffin
from Michigan
(1966–1979)

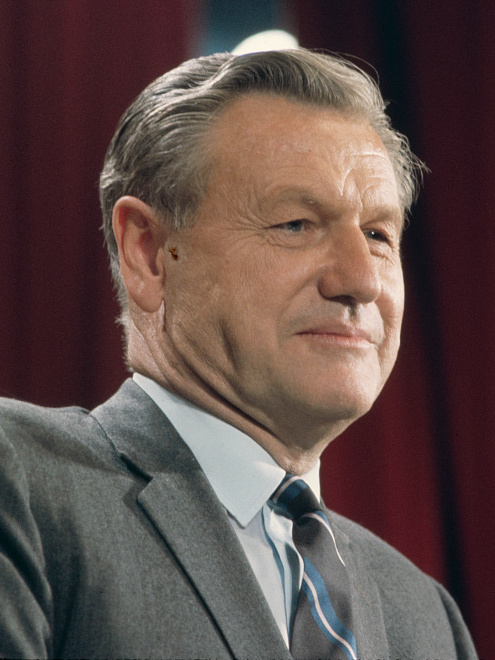
Governor
Nelson Rockefeller
of New York
(1959–1973)

=== Declined to be considered ===
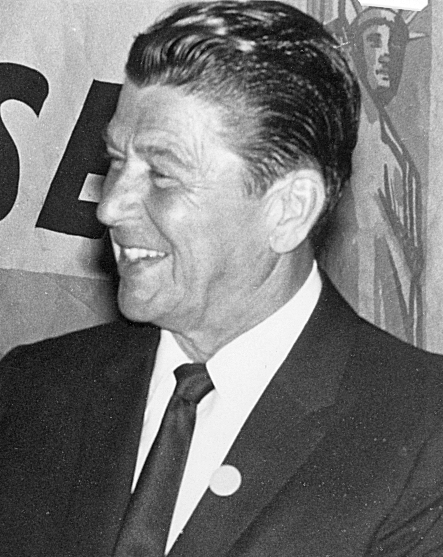
Governor
Ronald Reagan
of California
(1967–1975)

== See also ==
- 1968 Republican National Convention
- Republican Party presidential primaries, 1968
