= Andrew Castro =

American soldier and Purple Heart recipient

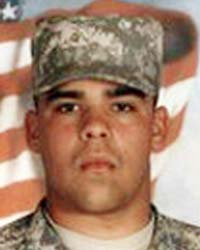
- Official portrait of Specialist Andrew J. Castro
- Born: January 11, 1990; Los Angeles, U.S.
- Died: August 28, 2010 (aged 20); Babur, Afghanistan
- Burial place: Pierce Brothers Valley Oaks Memorial Park, Westlake Village, CA
- Education: Westlake High School (California)
- Military career
- Allegiance: United States
- Branch: United States Army
- Service years: 2008–2010
- Rank: Army Intelligence Specialist
- Nickname: A.J.
- Units: 2nd Brigade Special Troops Battalion, 2nd Brigade Combat Team, 101st Airborne Division
- Conflicts: War in Afghanistan
- Awards: Bronze Star Medal; Purple Heart

Andrew Jordan "A.J." Castro (January 11, 1990 – August 28, 2010) was an American Army Intelligence Specialist who was killed in action in Babur, Afghanistan while serving during Operation Enduring Freedom. Castro was posthumously awarded the Purple Heart and Bronze Star Medal.

== Early life and education ==
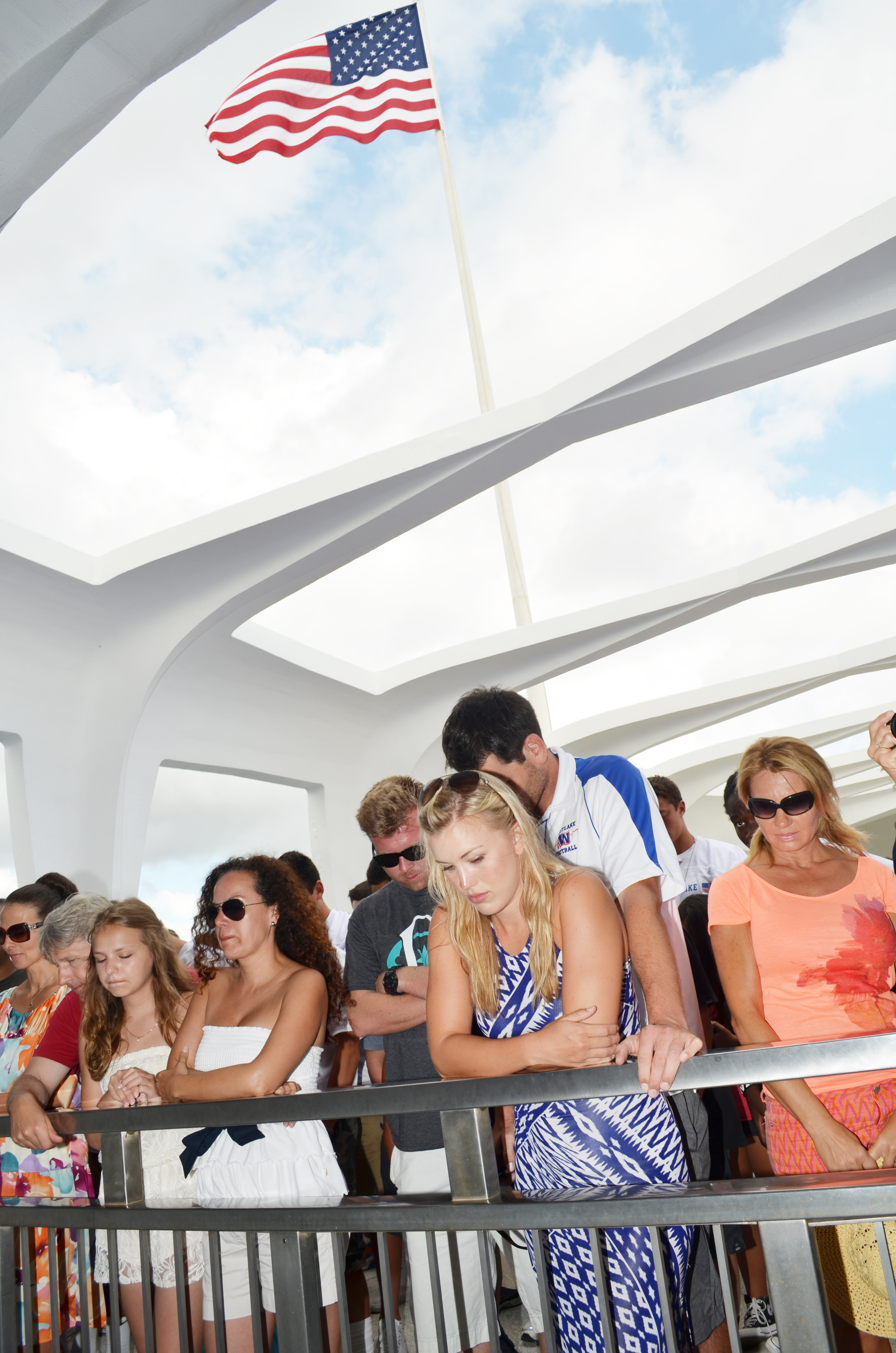
Members with California's Westlake High School Football Team take a moment of silence to honor Fallen Warriors, including Castro, during a memorial held at the USS Arizona Memorial Aug. 21

Castro was born to Hector Castro and Carmen Roman in 1990. Castro grew up in Westlake Village, California. From an early age, he displayed an interest in the military, visiting Army surplus stores and collecting camouflage gear.

While in high school, Castro was an active member of Westlake High School (California)'s football team playing linebacker. In 2006, the team, including Castro, embraced the Band of Brothers theme from the HBO miniseries on World War II. Coach Jim Benkert invited World War II veteran Ed “Doc” Pepping, a member of the 101st Airborne, to meet the players. He graduated in 2008.

His brother Ryan has served as a sergeant with the U.S. Army at Fort Sam Houston in San Antonio, Texas.

== United States Army ==
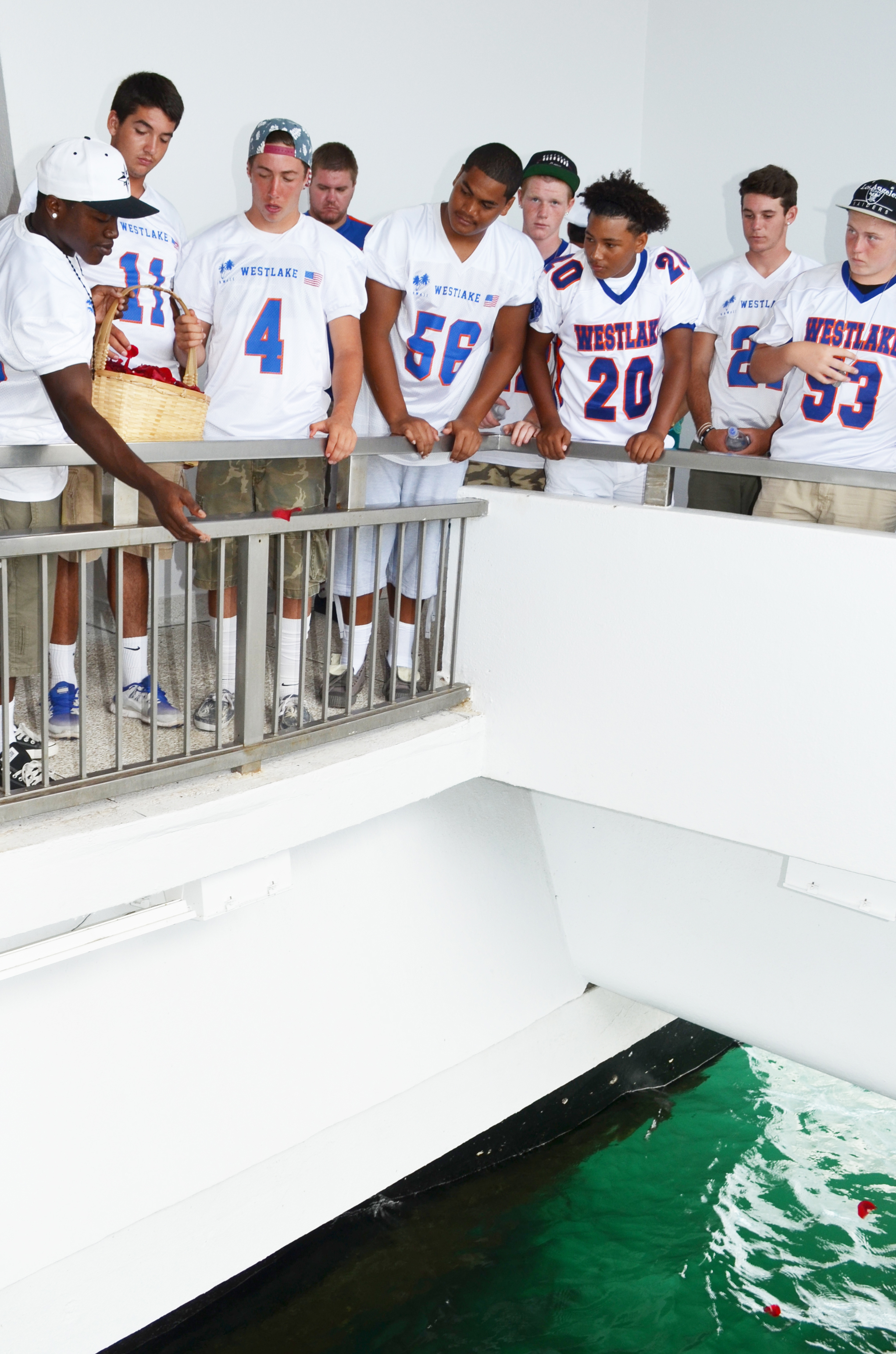
Westlake High School football players drop flower petals in the water in honor of Toner and Castro

After graduating, Castro entered the United States Army in June 2008, joining the 2nd Brigade Special Troops Battalion, 2nd Brigade Combat Team, 101st Airborne Division. He was stationed at Fort Campbell, Kentucky in February 2009. He specialized in human intelligence collection.

Castro chose to reenlist to join his platoon in Afghanistan, despite having the option to complete his service in the United States. Castro underwent training in Pashto, one of the languages spoken in Afghanistan, and his role included gathering intelligence by engaging with local Afghan communities.

=== Death ===
On August 28, 2010, three weeks after arriving in Afghanistan, Castro was killed by a land mine in the village of Babur while running toward fellow soldiers who were trapped and being attacked by the Taliban. He died alongside Sgt. Patrick K. Durham.

=== Awards and decorations ===
Castro was posthumously awarded the Bronze Star and Purple Heart. Other awards and Army decorations include: Meritorious Unit Citation; National Defense Service Medal; Global War on Terrorism Service Medal; Army Service Ribbon and Weapons Qualification: M249, expert.

Castro is included in the Military Intelligence Corps (United States Army) Memorial Wall.

=== Burial and tributes ===
Castro's casket returned to Dover Air Force Base. He was buried on September 10, 2010, at Pierce Brothers Valley Oaks Memorial Park in Westlake Village. He was 20 years old when he died.

In his memory, the Westlake High School football team wore his jersey number 45 and the emblem of the 101st Airborne Division on their helmets. Westlake High honored A.J. Castro during halftime of the football season opener. Oak Park High School (California) also honored Castro.

The California Governor Arnold Schwarzenegger issued a statement on Castro's death. Governor Schwarzenegger ordered Capitol flags flown at half-staff.

In 2011, Gary Sinise and his Lt. Dan Band performed a concert in Agoura Hills to honor Castro. The event raised over $100,000 for the Gary Sinise Foundation to support military personnel and their families.
