= List of awards and nominations received by Gary Sinise =

Gary Sinise awards and nominations
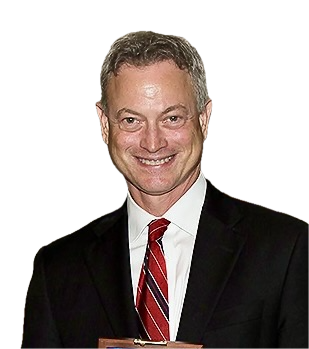
- Sinise in 2015
Award	Wins	Nominations
Academy Awards	0	1
Golden Globe Awards	1	3
Screen Actors Guild Awards	3	5
Primetime Emmy Awards	1	2
Tony Awards	1	5

Gary Sinise is an actor of the stage and screen, as well as a supporter of the U.S. military families, veterans, and active duty members.

Over his career he has earned various awards for his performances in film, television and theatre. This includes a Golden Globe Award, three Screen Actors Guild Awards, a Primetime Emmy Award and a Tony Award. He was nominated for the Academy Award for his role in Forrest Gump (1994).

Sinise first starred in the film adaptation of John Steinbeck's classic novel Of Mice and Men which he also directed and produced. He is perhaps most known for his role as Lieutenant Dan Taylor in the Robert Zemeckis film Forrest Gump (1994) opposite Tom Hanks, for which he was nominated for the Academy Award for Best Supporting Actor. He continued acting opposite Hanks in Ron Howard's Apollo 13 (1995), and Frank Darabont's The Green Mile (1999). He earned Primetime Emmy Award nominations for his performances as Harry S. Truman in Truman (1995), and the title role in the television film George Wallace. On stage he has earned four Tony Award nominations including for his performances in The Grapes of Wrath and One Flew Over the Cuckoo's Nest. He earned the Tony Award's Regional Theatre Award alongside the Steppenwolf Theatre Company.

Sinise is known as a supporter of various veterans' organizations and founded the Lt. Dan Band (named after his character in Forrest Gump), which plays at military bases around the world. For his humanitarian work and work with veterans he has earned numerous awards including the Presidential Citizens Medal by President George W. Bush in 2008, The Kennedy Center Award for the Human Spirit in 2018, the American Spirit Award from The National WWII Museum and The Congressional Medal of Honor Society Patriot Award in 2020.

== Major associations ==
=== Academy Awards ===
Year	Category	Nominated work	Result	Ref.
1995	Best Supporting Actor	Forrest Gump	Nominated	

=== Golden Globe Awards ===
Year	Category	Nominated work	Result	Ref.
1995	Best Supporting Actor – Motion Picture	Forrest Gump	Nominated	
1996	Best Actor – Miniseries or Television Film	Truman	Won	
1998	Best Actor – Miniseries or Television Film	George Wallace	Nominated	

=== Primetime Emmy Awards ===
Year	Category	Nominated work	Result	Ref.
1996	Outstanding Lead Actor in a Miniseries or a Movie	Truman	Nominated	
1998	Outstanding Lead Actor in a Miniseries or a Movie	George Wallace	Won	

=== Screen Actors Guild Awards ===
Year	Category	Nominated work	Result	Ref.
1995	Outstanding Actor in a Supporting Role	Forrest Gump	Nominated	
1995	Outstanding Actor in a Miniseries or Television Movie	The Stand	Nominated	
1996	Outstanding Cast in a Motion Picture	Apollo 13	Won	
1996	Outstanding Actor in a Miniseries or Television Movie	Truman	Won	
1998	Outstanding Actor in a Miniseries or Television Movie	George Wallace	Won	

=== Tony Awards ===
Year	Category	Nominated work	Result	Ref.
1985	Regional Theatre Award	The Steppenwolf Theatre Company	Won	
1990	Best Featured Actor in a Play	The Grapes of Wrath	Nominated	
1996	Best Play	Buried Child	Nominated	
1996	Best Direction of a Play	Buried Child	Nominated	
2001	Best Actor in a Play	One Flew Over the Cuckoo's Nest	Nominated	

== Humanitarian awards ==
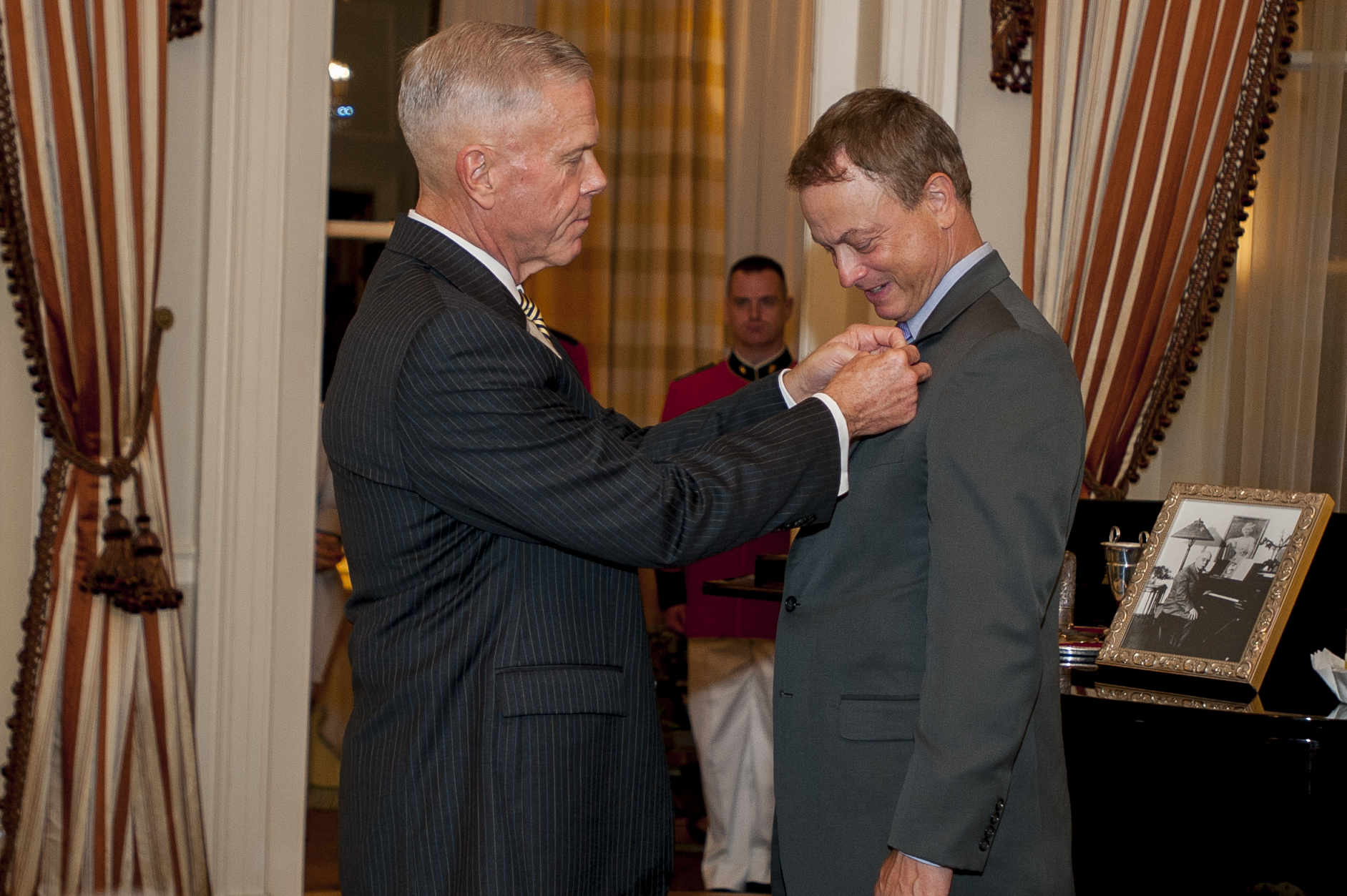
Sinise (right) becomes Honorary Marine - with Gen James F. Amos (left), Commandant of the Marine Corps (2013)

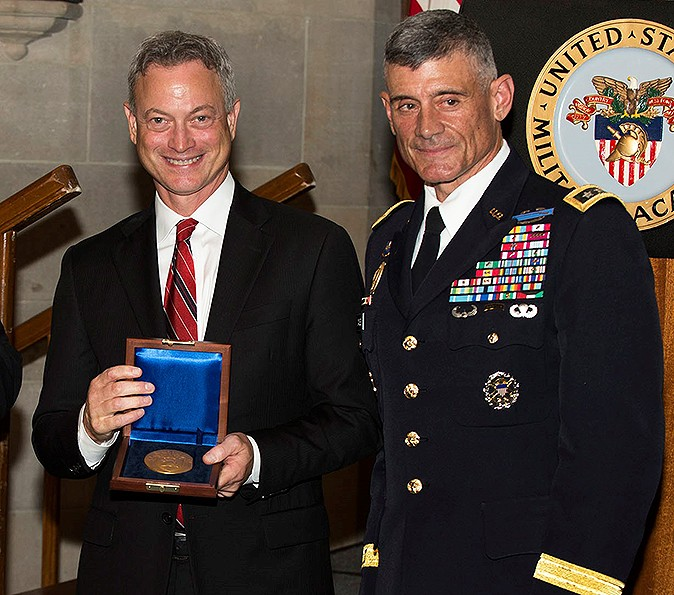
Sinise receives the 2015 Sylvanus Thayer Award from West Point superintendent LtGen Robert L. Caslen, Jr.

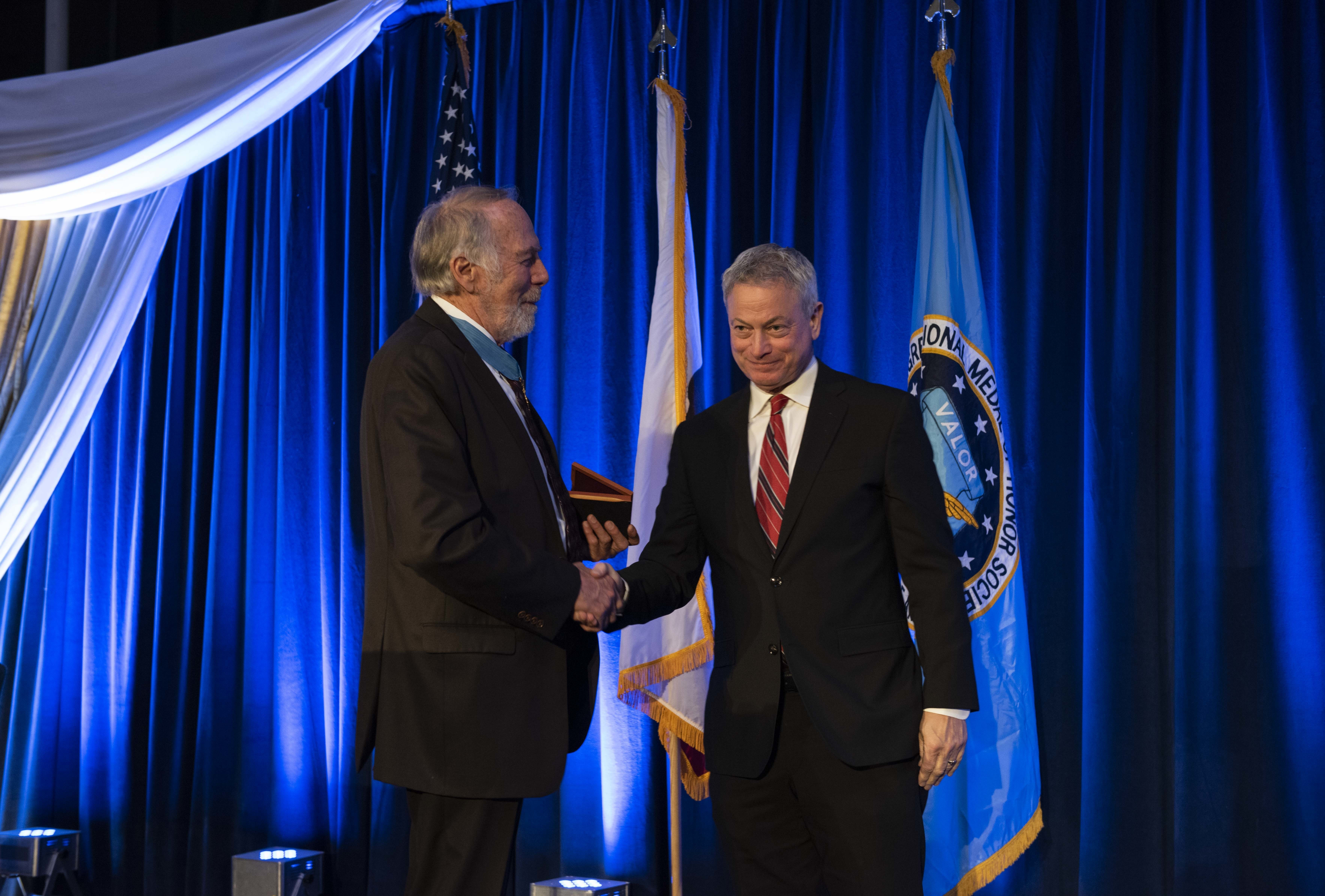
Sinise receives the Congressional Medal of Honor Society’s Patriot Award at the Ronald Reagan Presidential Library (2020)

Over the years, Sinise has received numerous honors for his humanitarian work and his work on behalf of military veterans and families.

- 2007 - American G.I. Spirit Award from the U.S. Department of Defense
- 2007 - The Bob Hope Award for Excellence in Entertainment from the Medal of Honor Society
- 2008 - Presidential Citizens Medal by President George W. Bush.
- 2008 - Ellis Island Medal of Honor from the National Ethnic Coalition
- 2008 - Honorary doctorate of fine arts from Cal State Stanislaus
- 2009 - Spirit of the USO Award from the USO
- 2012 - Boy Scouts of America Leader of the Year
- 2012 - Honorary chief petty officer by the United States Navy,
- 2012 - Spirit of Hope Award from U.S. Department of Defense
- 2013 - Civic Statesmanship Award by the U.S. Association of Former Members of Congress
- 2013 - Honorary Marine by the United States Marine Corps
- 2014 - Dwight D. Eisenhower Award from the National Defense Industrial Association (NDIA)
- 2015 - Sylvanus Thayer Award from West Point alumni association
- 2016 - Honorary battalion chief by the FDNY
- 2017 - James Cardinal Gibbons Medal from The Catholic University of America
- 2018 - Citizen Artist Human Spirit Award from The Kennedy Center
- 2018 - American Spirit Award from The National WWII Museum
- 2018 - Grand marshal, Tournament of Roses Parade
- 2019 - The Eisenhower Award from Business Executives for National Security (BENS)
- 2019 - Marine Corps League honorary membership
- 2020 - Honorary graduate of the United States Naval Academy
- 2020 - The Patriot Award from The Congressional Medal of Honor Society (CMOHS)

== Theatre awards ==
=== Drama Desk Awards ===
Year	Category	Nominated work	Result	Ref.
1983	Outstanding Director of a Play	True West	Nominated	
1986	Outstanding Director of a Play	Orphans	Nominated	
1990	Outstanding Actor in a Play	One Flew Over the Cuckoo's Nest	Nominated	

=== Obie Awards ===
Year	Category	Nominated work	Result	Ref.
1983	Outstanding Direction of a Play	True West	Won	

=== Outer Critics Circle Awards ===
Year	Category	Nominated work	Result	Ref.
1990	Outstanding Actor in a Play	The Grapes of Wrath	Nominated	

== Miscellaneous awards ==
=== Chicago Film Critics Association ===
Year	Category	Nominated work	Result	Ref.
1994	Best Supporting Actor	Forrest Gump	Nominated	

=== Dallas-Fort Worth Film Critics ===
Year	Category	Nominated work	Result	Ref.
1994	Best Supporting Actor	Forrest Gump	Nominated	

=== National Board of Review ===
Year	Category	Nominated work	Result	Ref.
1994	Best Supporting Actor	Forrest Gump	Won	

=== Saturn Awards ===
Year	Category	Nominated work	Result	Ref.
1994	Best Supporting Actor	Forrest Gump	Won	

=== Satellite Awards ===
Year	Category	Nominated work	Result	Ref.
1994	Best Actor – Miniseries or Television Film	Forrest Gump	Won	

=== CableACE Awards ===
Year	Category	Nominated work	Result	Ref.
1997	Best Actor in a Miniseries or Movie	George Wallace	Won	

=== Location Managers Guild Awards ===
Year	Category	Nominated work	Result	Ref.
2020	Humanitarian Award	Gary Sinise Foundation	Won	
