= Rademacher (disambiguation) =

Rademacher is a German surname.

Rademacher may also refer to:

- House of Rademacher, German noble family
- Rademacher (band)
- Rademacher complexity, a statistical measure
- Rademacher distribution, a probability distribution in statistics
- Rademacher system, a statistical system of functions
- Rademacher's theorem, a statistical theorem in measure theory
