= Rademacher =

Rademacher is an occupational surname of German origin, which means "wheelmaker", associated with the House of Rademacher, German noble family. It may refer to:

== People ==
- Arthur Rademacher (1889–1981), Australian football player
- Autumn Rademacher (born 1975), American basketball coach
- Bill Rademacher (1942–2018), American football player
- Debbie Rademacher (born 1966), American soccer player
- Erich Rademacher (1901–1979), German swimmer
- Franz Rademacher (1906–1973), German diplomat
- Hans Rademacher (1892–1969), German-born American mathematician
- Ingo Rademacher (born 1971), Australian actor
- Isaac Rademacher (born 1977), American soldier
- Joachim Rademacher (1906–1970), German water polo player
- Joseph Rademacher (bishop) (1840–1900), American bishop
- Joseph Rademacher (soldier) (born 1985), American soldier
- Mark Rademacher (1963–1983), American soldier
- Pete Rademacher (1928–2020), American boxer
- Rudolf Rademacher (1913–1953), German pilot
