= Variation of the field =

Heraldic term

In heraldry, variations of the field are any of a number of ways that a field (or a charge) may be covered with a pattern, rather than a flat tincture or a simple division of the field.

== Patterning with ordinaries and subordinaries ==
The diminutives of the ordinaries are frequently employed to vary the field.

Any of these patterns may be counterchanged by the addition of a division line; for example, barry argent and azure, counterchanged per fess or checquy Or and gules, counterchanged per chevron.

=== Barry, paly, bendy, pily, chevronny ===
A shield barry of ten argent and gules

When the field is patterned with an even number of horizontal (fesswise) stripes, this is described as barry e.g. of six or eight, usually of a colour and metal specified, e.g. barry of six argent and gules (this implies that the chiefmost piece is argent). (Note: More rarely, a barry field can be of two colours or two metals. The arms of the Kingdom of Hawai'i show a very unusual example of barry of three different tinctures, and there are even more exceptional examples of barry of a single tincture, as in the arms of Kempten on the Zurich roll. The arms of Eyfelsberg zum Weyr provide a perhaps unique example of barry of four different tinctures that do not repeat.) With ten or more pieces, the field is described as barruly. A field with narrow piles throughout, issuing from either the dexter or sinister side of the shield, is barry pily.

A shield paly argent and gules

When the field is patterned with an even number of vertical stripes (pallets), the field is described as paly.

A shield bendy azure and argent

A shield bendy sinister sable and argent

A shield Chevronny Or and gules

When the field is patterned with a series of diagonal stripes (bendlets), running from top-left to bottom-right, the field is described as bendy. In the opposite fashion (top-right to bottom-left) it is bendy sinister (of skarpes, the diminutive in England of the bend sinister); of chevronels, chevronny. An unusual example of bendy is one in which a metal alternates with two colours.

In modern practice the number of pieces is nearly always even. A shield of thirteen vertical stripes, alternating argent and gules, would not be paly of thirteen, argent and gules, but argent, six pallets gules. (Note: This is the lower portion of the shield on the Great Seal of the United States. The incorrect blazon is usually used anyway, to preserve the reference to the thirteen original colonies, and this form is occasionally imitated allusively.) One unusual design is described in part as bendy of three though, as each third is again divided, the effect is of a six-part division.

If no number of pieces is specified, it may be left up to the heraldic artist, but is still represented with an even number.

An instance of a fess... paly Sable, Argent, Bleu celeste and Or occurs in the arms of the 158th Quartermaster Battalion of the United States Army, although this is atypical terminology and it could be argued that the fess should be blazoned as per pale, in dexter per pale sable and argent, and in sinister per pale bleu celeste and or.

In the modern arms of the Count of Schwarzburg, the quarters are divided by a cross bendy of three tinctures.

When the shield is divided by lines both palewise and bendwise, with the pieces coloured alternately like a chess board, this is paly-bendy; if the diagonal lines are reversed, paly-bendy sinister. If horizontal rather than vertical lines are used, it is barry-bendy; and similarly, when reversed, barry-bendy sinister.

A field which seems to be composed of a number of triangular pieces is barry bendy and bendy sinister.

=== Chequy ===
Chequy or and azure, the famous mediaeval arms of de Warenne, Earl of Surrey, today quartered by the Duke of Norfolk. Effectively a field azure semée of chequers or with the first chequer placed in the dexter chief

When divided by palewise and fesswise lines into a chequered pattern, the field is chequy. The coat of arms of Croatia Chequy gules and argent is a well known example of the red and white chequy. The arms of a Bleichröder, banker to Bismarck, show chequy fimbriated (the chequers being divided by thin lines). The arms of the 85th Air Division (Defense) of the United States Air Force show a checky grid on part of the field, though this is to be distinguished from chequy. The number of chequers is generally indeterminate, though the fess in the arms of Robert Stewart, Lord of Lorn, they are blazoned as being "of four tracts" (in four horizontal rows); and in arms of Toledo, fifteen chequers are specified. The number of vertical rows can also be specified. When a bend or bend sinister, or one of their diminutives, is chequy, the chequers follow the direction of the bend unless otherwise specified. James Parker cites the French term equipolle to mean chequy of nine, though mentions that this is identical to a cross quarter-pierced (strangely, this is blazoned as a Latin square chequy of nine in the arms of the Statistical Society of Canada). He also gives the arms of Prospect as an unusual example of chequy, Chequy in perspective argent and sable; which must be distinguished from cubes as a charge. Chequy is not "fanciable"; that is, the lines of chequy cannot be modified by lines of partition.

=== Lozengy, fusilly, masculy and rustré ===
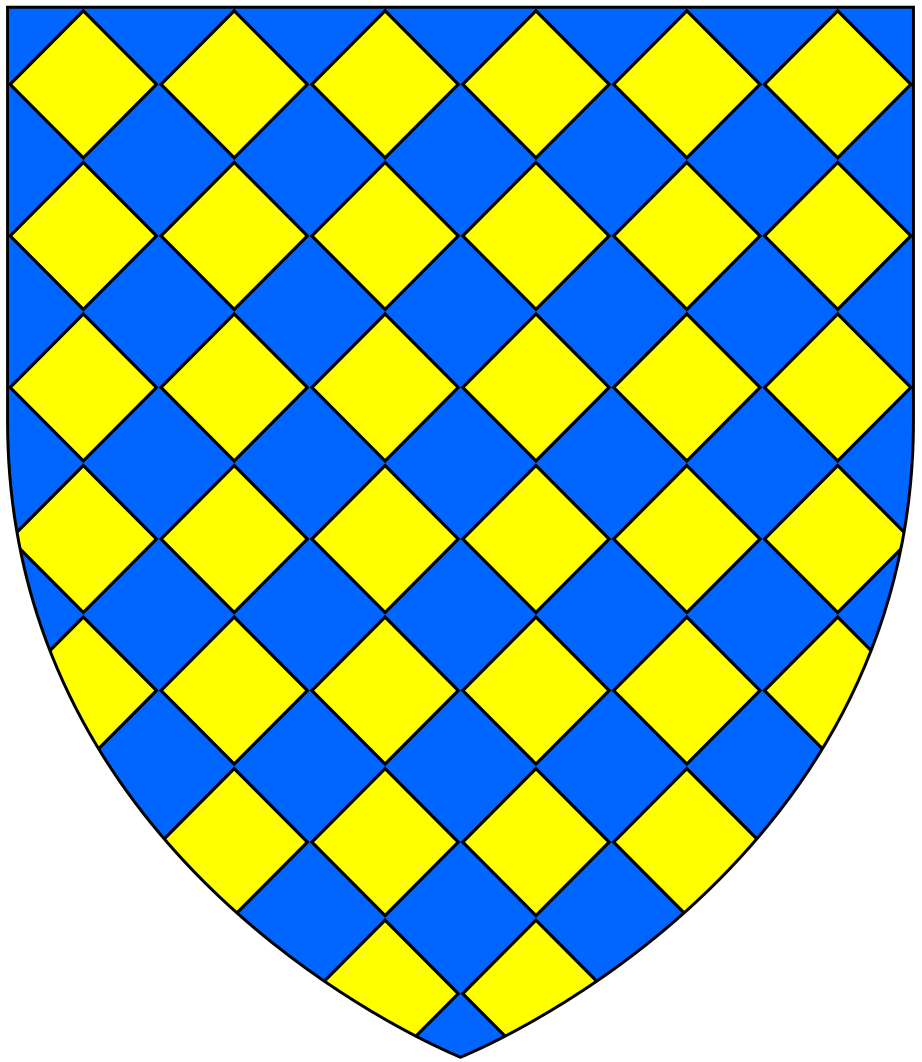
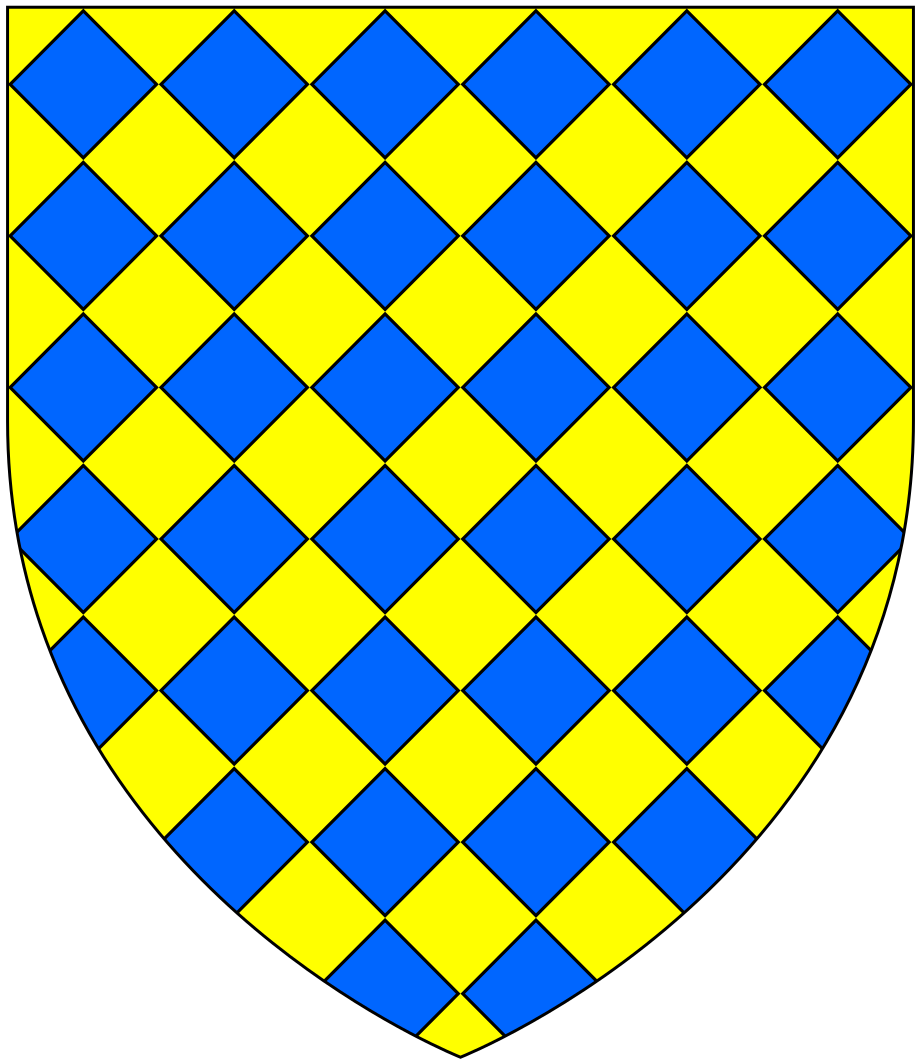
Left: Lozengy azure and or (effectively a field azure semée with lozenges or); right: Lozengy or and azure (effectively a field or semée with lozenges azure)

When the shield is divided by both bendwise and bendwise-sinister lines, creating a field of lozenges coloured like a chessboard, the result is lozengy. (Note: Generally lozengy is depicted with the lozenges narrower in width than would be bendy bendy-sinister, which at least in theory would be a different field.) A field lozengy must be distinguished from an ordinary such as a bend which is blazoned of one tincture and called lozengy; this means that the ordinary is entirely composed of lozenges, touching at their obtuse corners. Such arrangement is better blazoned as lozenges bendwise. (Note: The royal arms of Bavaria have occasionally been blazoned as lozengy fesswise; that is, with the narrower axis of the component lozenges vertically rather than horizontally oriented. Similarly, Landkreis Erding adopted arms with a chief bendy lozengy, and the arms of the Crofts of Dalton-in-Furness, Lancashire, England are Bendy lozengy argent and sable.) In paly bendy, the bendwise lines are supposed to be less acute than in plain lozengy.

Part of the field of the arms of the 544th Intelligence, Surveillance and Reconnaissance Group of the United States Air Force is lozengy in perspective.

A field fusilly can be very difficult to distinguish from a field lozengy; (Note: In early days no clear distinction was made between lozenges and fusils) the fusil is supposed to be proportionately narrower than the lozenge, and the bendwise and bendwise-sinister lines are therefore more steeply sloped.

A field masculy is composed entirely of mascles; that is, lozenges pierced with a lozenge shape – this creates a solid fretwork surface and is to be distinguished from a field fretty.

An extremely rare, possibly unique example of a field rustré - counterchanged rustres - occurs in Canadian heraldry in the arms of R.C. Purdy Chocolates Ltd.

=== Gyronny ===
Gyronny of eight or and sable, arms of Campbell

A shield that is divided quarterly and per saltire, forming eight triangular pieces, is gyronny. This is technically a field covered with gyrons, a rare charge in the form of a wedge, shown individually in the well-known arms of Mortimer. Possibly the best-known example is in the arms of the Scottish family of Campbell: Gyronny of eight or and sable, borne most notably by the Duke of Argyll, Chief of the Clan Campbell. The first tincture in the blazon is that of the triangle in dexter chief. (Note: There are apparently very rare examples in which gyronny is of more than two tinctures, such as the arms of Origo of Milan: Gyronny, sable, argent, vert, sable, argent, vert, sable, vert.) Gyronny can also have a different number of pieces than eight; for example, Sir William Stokker, Lord Mayor of London, had a field gyronny of six; there may be gyronny of ten or twelve, and the arms of Clackson provide an example of gyronny of sixteen. (Note: There cannot be gyronny of four, as that would be either per saltire or quarterly; or three, as that would be tierced in pairle or tierced in pairle reversed.) While the gyrons of gyronny almost invariably meet in the fess point, the exact centre of the shield, the arms of the University of Zululand are an unusual example of gyronny meeting in the nombril point, a point on the shield midway between the fess point and the base point. Gyronny can be modified by most of the lines of partition, with exceptions such as dancetty and angled. The canting arms of Maugiron show gyronny of six, clearly deemed mal-gironné ('badly gyronny').

=== Variations of lines ===
Any of the division lines composing the variations of the field above may be blazoned with most of the different line shapes; e.g. paly nebuly of six, or and sable. One very common use of this is barry wavy azure and argent; this is often used to represent either water or a body of water in general, or the sea in particular, though there are other if less commonly used methods of representing the sea, including in a more naturalistic manner.

== Semé ==
Medieval coat of arms of France: Azure semy-de-lis or

When the field (or a charge) is described as semé or semy (occasionally semee) of a sub-ordinary or other charge, it is depicted as being scattered (literally 'seeded') with many copies of that charge. Semé is regarded as part of the field and thus within the opening section of the blazon describing the field before the first comma. Thus: Azure semy-de-lis or not Azure, semy-de-lis or. A charge on top would be blazoned: Azure semy-de-lis or, a bend argent.

To avoid confusion with a simple use of a large number of the same charge (e.g. Azure, fifteen fleurs-de-lis or), the charges semé are ideally depicted cut off at the edge of the field, though in olden depictions this is often not the case. An example of this can be found in the modern Coat of arms of Denmark, which now features three lions among nine hearts, but the ancient arms depicted three leopards on a semy of hearts, the number of which varied and was not fixed at nine until 1819. There are also some exceptions to this, as in the case of some bordures blazoned semé, which are usually depicted with a discrete number (often eight) of the charge. Thus for example the arms of Jesus College, Cambridge, which despite a blazon of seme are invariably depicted with either eight or ten crowns golde on its bordure. A large number (usually eight) of any one charge arranged as if upon an invisible bordure is said to be in orle, an orle being a diminutive band within the bordure.

Most small charges can be depicted as semé, e.g. semé of roses, semé of estoiles, and so forth. In English heraldry, several types of small charges have special terms to refer to their state as semé:

- semé of cross-crosslets: crusily
- semé of fleurs-de-lis: semé-de-lis or semy-de-lis
- semé of bezants: bezanté
- semé of plates (roundels argent): platé
- semé of torteaux (roundels gules): tortelly
- semé of billets: billeté/billetté/billetty
- semé of annulets: annulletty
- semé of sparks: étincellé
- semé of gouttes ('drops', of liquid): goutté / gutté, with variants:
  - gutté-de-sang (blood, gules)
  - gutté-de-poix (pitch/bitumen, sable)
  - gutté-d'eau (water, argent)
  - gutté-de-larmes (tears, azure)
  - gutté-d'olives or d'huile (olive oil, vert)

When a field semé is of a metal, the charges strewn on it must be of a colour, and vice versa, so as not to offend the rule of tincture.

In Cornish heraldry, the arms granted 1764 to a Hockin family are Per fesse wavy gules and azure a lion passant gardant or, beneath his feet a musket lying horizontally proper; and semé of fleur de lys confusedly dispersed of the third [emphasis added], alluding to an incident in which the marksmanship of a Cornish young man, Thomas Hockin, caused a boatload of French coastal raiders to scatter and flee back to their ship.

The 1995–2002 arms of Rogaška Slatina, Slovenia, show Vert, semee of disks or decreasing in size from base to chief.

The heraldic furs of the ermine family appear to be semé of the "ermine spots", but they are not counted as such except when the tinctures of the spots and the field cannot be described as one of the four furs ermine, ermines, erminois, or pean. (Note: For an example of Vert semee of ermine spots argent, see the coat of Wrexham County Borough Council.)

== Masoned ==
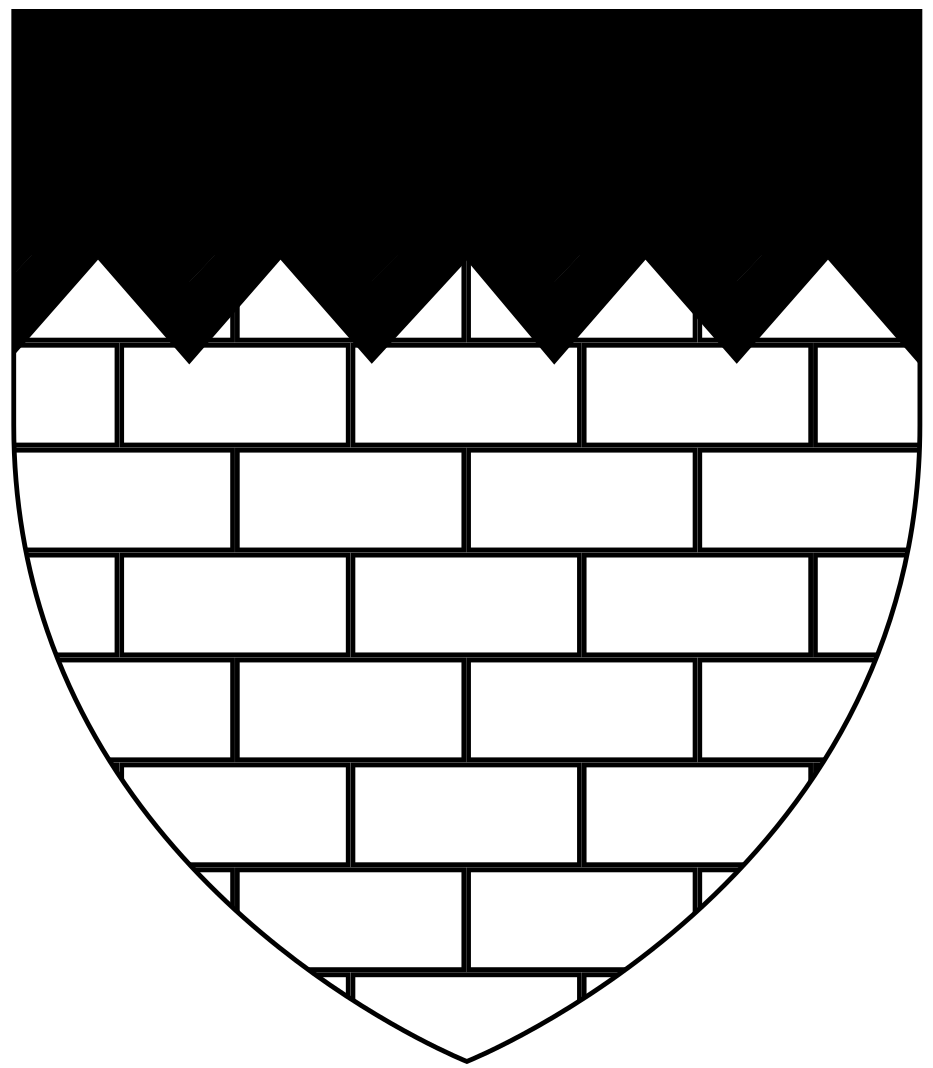
Argent masonry sable, a chief indented of the second. Arms of Reynell of Devon, England

A field or ordinary masoned shows a pattern like that of a brick or ashlar stone wall. This can be proper or of a named tincture. The tincture relates to the mortar between the stones or bricks: a wall of red bricks with white mortar is thus blazoned gules masoned argent.

== Honeycomb ==
The town of Viļāni, Latvia, has part of its field honeycombed. Another example of this is in the arms of Fusagasugá, Cundinamarca, Colombia.

== Folds ==
The arms of the Special Troops Battalion of the 2nd Brigade, 1st Cavalry Division of the United States Army has the unique field Per pale sable and gules with stylized folds sanguine, the sinister half of the field symbolizing a warrior's cape.

== Pappellony ==
Gules papellony or. Arms of Baron de Châteaubriant (ancient)

A field pappellony (French: papillon, 'butterfly') shows a pattern like the wings of a butterfly, though this is categorised as a fur. The number of rows of pappellony are sometimes defined, such as seven in the arms of the Aleberici Family of Bologna. The ancient arms of the French Barons de Châteaubriant were Gules papellony or. The Italian term squamoso and the French écaillé, meaning 'scaly', are similar.

== Pied at random ==
Used in some South African coats, this means patterned like the piebald markings of various domesticated animals. There are other examples of South African heraldry that are more elaborately blazoned.

== Tapissé of wheat ==
Arms of Melfort, Saskatchewan, with the compartment tapissé of wheat.

A field tapissé of wheat is entirely covered (literally "carpeted") by an interlocking stylised pattern looking like a wheat field.

== Diapering ==
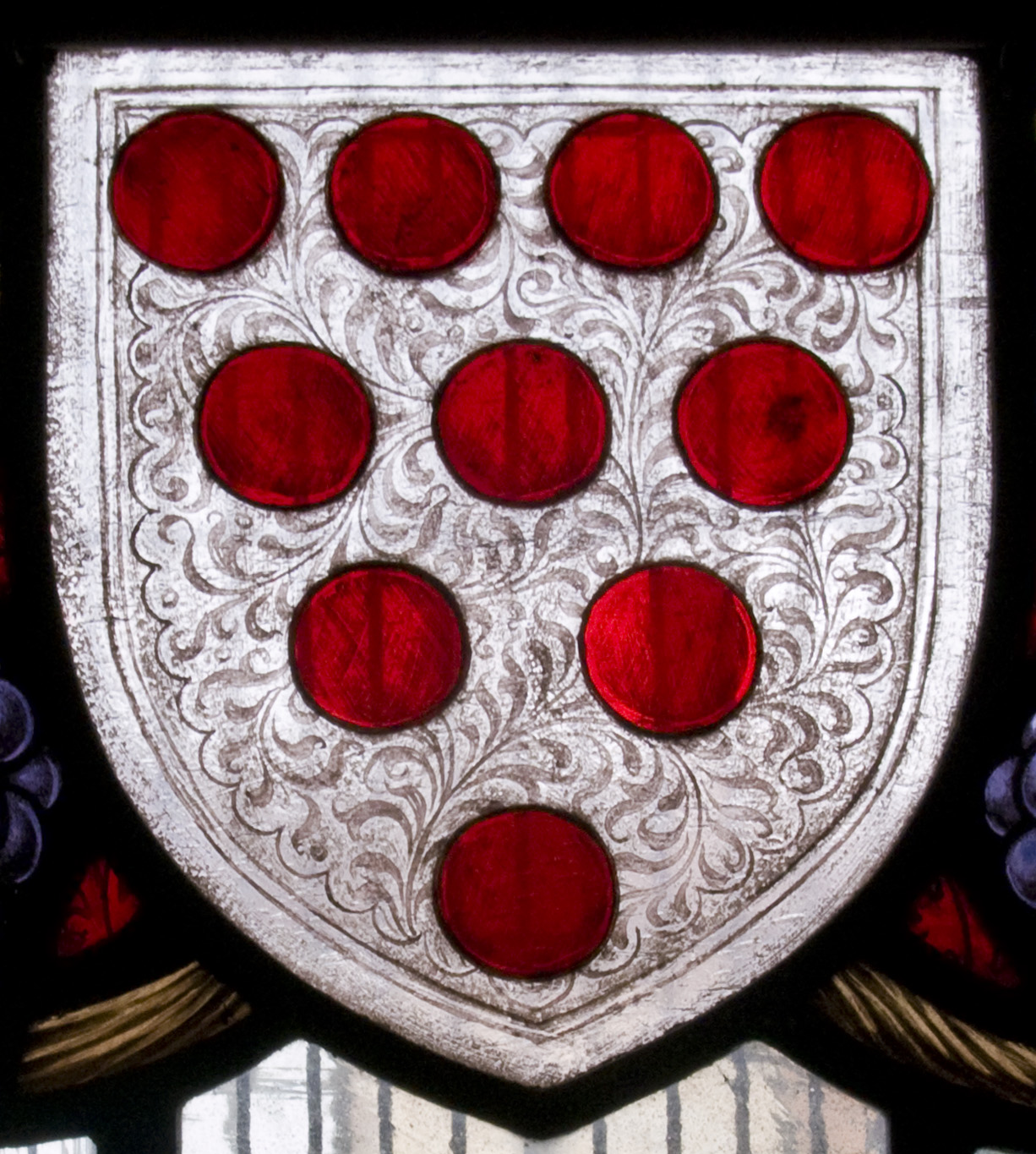
Diapering of the field of the shield of the Diocese of Worcester: Argent, ten torteaux four three two and one

In English heraldry, diapering, or covering areas of flat colour with a tracery design, is not considered a variation of the field; it is not specified in blazon, being a decision of the individual artist. A coat depicted with diapering is considered the same as a coat drawn from the same blazon but depicted without diapering.

In French heraldry, diapering is sometimes explicitly blazoned.

== Fretty and trellisé ==
A field fretty is composed of bendlets and bendlets-sinister or scarps, interleaved over one another to give the impression of a trellis. Although almost invariably the bendlets and scarpes are of the same tincture, there is an example in which they are of two different metals. It is rare for the number of pieces of the fretty to be specified, though this is sometimes done in French blazon. The bendlets and bendlets sinister are very rarely anything other than straight, as in the arms of David Robert Wooten, in which they are raguly. Objects can be placed in the position of the bendlets and bendlets sinister and described as fretty of, as in the arms of the Muine Bheag Town Commissioners: Party per fess or fretty of blackthorn branches leaved proper and ermine, a fess wavy azure. Square fretty is similarly composed of barrulets and pallets.

Trellisé appears in the arms of Luc-Normand Tellier, where it consists of bendlets, bendlets sinister, and barrulets interlaced. These are not, strictly speaking, variations of the field, since they are depicted as being on the field rather than in it.

== Blazoning of French adjectives ==
Variations of the field present a particular problem concerning consistent spelling of adjectival endings in English blazons. Heraldry developed at a time when, subsequent to the Norman Conquest, English clerks wrote in Anglo-Norman French; consequently, many terms in English heraldry, as a distinct style of the craft, are of French origin, as is the practice of most adjectives being placed after nouns rather than, as is standard in English, before. A problem arises as to acceptable spellings of French words used in English blazons, especially in the case of adjectival endings, determined in normal French usage by gender and number. It is considered by some heraldic authorities as pedantry to adopt strictly correct French linguistic usage for English blazons. E.g. Cussans (1869):

... for to describe two hands as appaumées, because the word main is feminine in French, savours somewhat of pedantry. A person may be a good armorist, and a tolerable French scholar, and still be uncertain whether an Escallop-shell, covered with bezants, should be blazoned as bezanté or bezantée.

Cussans adopted the convention of spelling all French adjectives in the masculine singular, without regard to the gender and number of the nouns they qualify; however, as he admitted, the more common convention was to spell all French adjectives in the feminine singular form, for example: a chief undée and a saltire undée, even though the French nouns chef and sautoir are in fact masculine.

== Bibliography ==
- Burke, Bernard (1884). The General Armory of England, Scotland, Ireland, and Wales: Comprising a registry of armorial bearings from the earliest to the present time. London: Harrison & Sons. p. 245. OCLC 600067620 – via Internet Archive.
- Cussans, John E. (1869). Handbook of Heraldry (2nd ed.). London: Chatto and Windus. OCLC 889852354 – via Internet Archive.
- Fox-Davies, Arthur Charles (1909). A Complete Guide to Heraldry. London / Edinburgh: T. C. & E. C. Jack – via Internet Archive.
- Parker, James; Gough, Henry (1894). A Glossary of Terms Used in Heraldry. London: James Parker. LCCN 77094021. OCLC 926917439 – via Internet Archive.
- Woodward, John; Burnett, George (1892) [1884]. A Treatise on Heraldry, British and Foreign: With English and French Glossaries. Edinburgh: W. & A. B. Johnson. LCCN 02020303 – via Internet Archive.
