= Joseph Rademacher =

Joseph Rademacher may refer to:

- Joseph Rademacher (soldier) (born 1985), United States Army staff sergeant
- Joseph Rademacher (bishop) (1840–1900), American prelate of the Roman Catholic Church
