= Norman Powell (television executive) =

American television executive (1934–2021)

Norman S. Powell
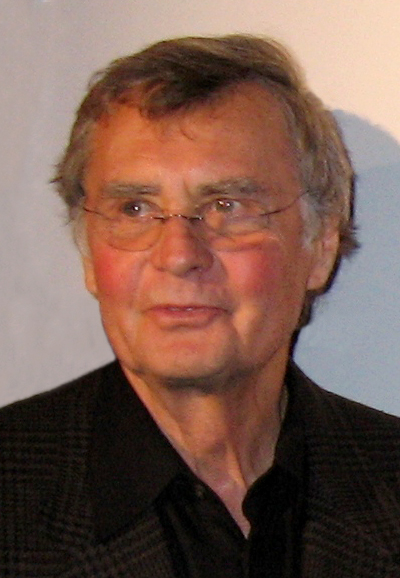
- Powell in 2009
- Born: Norman Scott Barnes; November 2, 1934; Los Angeles, California, U.S.
- Died: June 16, 2021 (aged 86)
- Occupation: Television producer
- Years active: 1958–2009
- Known for: Brothers at War
- Parent(s): Joan Blondell (mother); George Barnes (biological father); Dick Powell (adoptive father)

Norman Scott Powell (né Barnes; November 2, 1934 – June 16, 2021) was an American television executive.

== Biography ==
Norman Scott Barnes was born November 2, 1934, in Los Angeles. The son of actress Joan Blondell and cinematographer George Barnes, he was adopted by his mother's second husband, actor Dick Powell, in February 1938 under the name Norman Scott Powell. He had a sister, Ellen, from his mother's marriage to Dick Powell, and two siblings from Dick Powell's remarriage.

He attended Cornell University and was married to Ann Traub, with whom he had three children: Sandra, Scott, and Stephanie. After his divorce from Traub, he married Ellen Levine, with whom he had a son, Matthew.

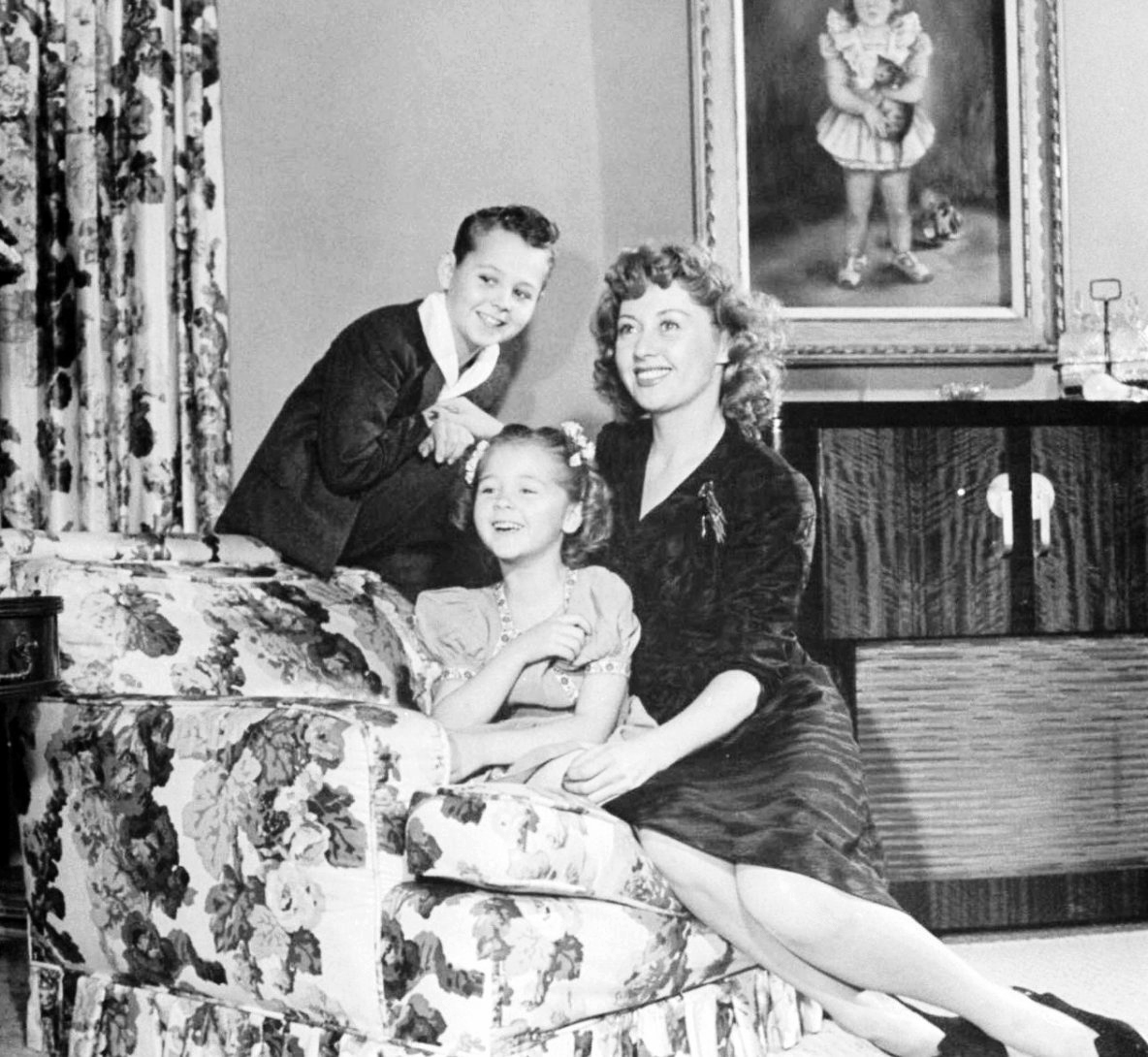
Powell with his mother, Joan Blondell, and his half-sister Ellen Powell (1944)

Powell produced shows such as Gunsmoke and The Big Valley. He produced episodes of the 2002–03 season of the TV series 24 and the 2006 season of The Unit. He produced the award-winning documentary Brothers at War with director/producer Jake Rademacher and executive producers Gary Sinise and David Scantling.

Powell died on June 16, 2021, from acute respiratory failure.

== Accolades ==
He was nominated for two Emmy Awards: Outstanding Drama Series for 24, and Outstanding Limited Series for Washington: Behind Closed Doors (1977). He was nominated for the Producers Guild of America Award for Producer of the Year in an Episodic Drama, for 24.
