= Kimo Williams =

J.Kimo Williams
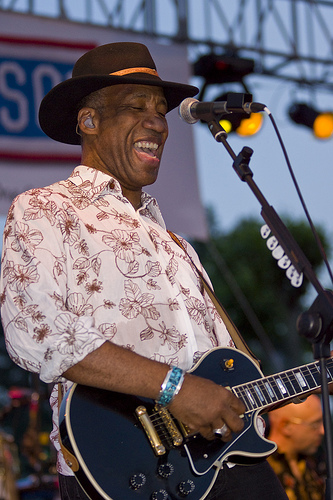
- Williams playing with the Lt. Dan Band on June 26, 2009

Background information
- Born: James Lafayette Williams; January 8, 1950 (age 76); Amityville, New York, United States
- Origin: Sunset Beach Hawaii, United States
- Genres: Musician, composer
- Formerly of: Lt. Dan Band
- Website: jkimowilliams.com

James "Kimo" Williams (born January 8, 1950) is an American composer, musician and professor who has performed with a number of ensembles including his ensemble Kimotion and the Lt. Dan Band, that he co-founded with film/TV actor Gary Sinise. While he is perhaps best known for his work with the Lt. Dan Band, Williams has worked on a number of other projects including: award-winning photography, releasing multiple CDs, writing several classical Symphonies and String Quartets. Cognizant of the opportunities he had, as well as those he did not due to a childhood in which he moved often, Williams speaks to students about his history, their future and their need to combat mediocrity.

== Background ==
James Kimo Williams was born in Amityville, New York, and spent much of his childhood divided between U.S. Air Force bases, and on his grandparents' sharecropper farm in North Carolina, where he picked tobacco, plowed fields and tended livestock on their rural farm.

In 1968, he moved to Hawaii to join his father (a career Air Force Sergeant) and attended Leilehua High School. A dedicated, but inexperienced guitar player, he also took up sports and was an all-star football performer with a scholarship invitation from Arizona State. The night before enlisting in the US Army on July 4, 1969, he attended his first major music concert: Jimi Hendrix playing at the Waikiki Bowl. He was so inspired by this concert and the music of Jimi Hendrix, that he dedicated himself to music and playing guitar.

After leaving Vietnam in 1970, Williams used his GI Benefit and attended the Berklee College of Music. While a student he founded The Paumalu Symphony, now known as Kimotion. After teaching at Berklee for one year, he graduated in 1976 with a BA in Composition.

In 1976 Williams met his music partner and future wife Carol, a fellow Berklee student and married two years later.

== Career ==
=== Military ===
After basic training, he was sent to Vietnam (the day after his 20th birthday), where he served with a unit of the 20th Combat Engineer Brigade in Lai Khe, building roads and clearing land in the jungle. One of Williams' earliest, and most often cited, musical opportunities was in Vietnam when an Army entertainment director heard him play and suggested that he perform for the troops in the field. The Soul Coordinators was born of this request and started Kimo Williams' long resume of performances, both with bands and on his own.

After completing his studies at Berklee College of Music marrying his wife in 1978, the couple together joined the Army Band program, spending a year with the 9th Infantry Division Band at Ft. Lewis, Washington. Kimo went on to attend Officer Candidate School and was commissioned a 2nd lieutenant in 1980. His first assignment brought him to Fort Sheridan, IL: close enough to Chicago that he and Carol could continue producing and performing with his large ensemble (now called “Kimotion”) and their small-group “Williams and Williams”, in local clubs and concert venues. They set up a music publishing company (One Omik Music), as well as launched their own record company (Little Beck Music). To record their music, they rehabbed an old storefront in Chicago, and built and operated a recording studio there.

In 1983 he earned his MA in Management from Webster University.

When he left the army in 1987 to pursue composing full-time he had risen to the rank of captain. He taught at Sherwood Conservatory of Music in Chicago, and in the Music Department at Columbia College Chicago.

He completed his military service in the Army Reserves by becoming the Bandmaster for the 85th Division Army Reserve Band, and retired from the Army Reserves as a Chief Warrant Officer in 1996.

=== Music composition and academia ===
In 1997, Williams wrote the music for the Steppenwolf Theatre production of A Streetcar Named Desire, leading to his partnership with Gary Sinise and, in 2003, the creation of the Lt. Dan Band (named for Sinise's character in film Forrest Gump). Also in 1997, he directed the Goodman Theatre's production of the August Wilson play, “Ma Rainey’s Black Bottom”. In 2008, Williams' Fanfare for Life was performed during the Alabama Symphony's annual musical tribute to Martin Luther King Jr.

His compositions include works for chamber ensembles and orchestras and have been performed by groups worldwide, including the Czech National Symphony Orchestra and the Chicago Sinfonietta. In October 2013 a commission by Williams for the string quartet ETHEL was premiered at the Brooklyn Academy of Music.

In 1996, he accepted a position in the Arts Entertainment and Media Management Department of Columbia College. He retired from that position in 2017 and moved to Shepherdstown West Virginia.

== Honors ==
Kimo Williams was named Chicagoan of the Year in 2006, and was recognized for a lifetime of work including the 1998 founding of the United States Vietnam Art Program.

In 1999, he received the Lancaster Symphony Orchestra's Composer Award, and has been the recipient of honors from the Detroit Symphony Orchestra and the Savannah Symphony Orchestra. Buffalo Soldiers, one of his most well-known works, was the result of a commission by The West Point Academy to celebrate their 2002 Bicentennial.

In 2007 he was named a Fulbright Program for his works in music, education and history.

He received the Vietnam Veterans of America Excellence in the Arts Award in 2014 at the VVA National Leadership Conference in Wichita.
