= James Cardinal Gibbons Medal =

- Awarded for: Distinguished and meritorious service to the Roman Catholic Church, the United States of America, or The Catholic University of America
- Country: United States
- Presented by: Catholic University of America Alumni Association
- First award: 1949

The James Cardinal Gibbons Medal is named in honor James Cardinal Gibbons, the founder and first chancellor of The Catholic University of America. It is intended to honor any person who, in the opinion of the university's Alumni Association's board of governors, has rendered distinguished and meritorious service to the Roman Catholic Church, the United States of America, or The Catholic University of America.

Winners include Bishop Fulton J. Sheen, Senator John F. Kennedy, Speaker John W. McCormack, Sargent Shriver, Nancy Reagan, Supreme Court Justice Antonin Scalia, Sister Helen Prejean, and Ronan Tynan.

The Gibbons Medal is conferred by the university president on behalf of the CUA Alumni Association during the alumni awards ceremony. John F. Kennedy was awarded the medal while still a senator, upon the nomination of Eddie Pryzbyla, a future winner himself.

== Winners ==
Year	Awardee	Background
2017	Gary Sinise	Actor, veterans advocate
2016	None awarded	
2015	Timothy Shriver	CEO of the Special Olympics
2014	None awarded	
2013	Sr. Mary Scullion, RSM	Activist, co-founder of Philadelphia's Project H.O.M.E.
2012	Kevin Ryan	President of Covenant House International
2011	None awarded	
2010	Sr. Alice Zachman, SSND	Human rights advocate in Guatemala
2009	Ronan Tynan	Irish singer, Paralympic athlete
2008	Kenneth Hackett	President of Catholic Relief Services
2007	None awarded	
2006	None awarded	
2005	Darrell Green	American football player, founder of the Darrell Green Youth Life Foundation
2004	Gen. Barry McCaffrey	United States Army general, national security consultant
2003	Sr. Helen Prejean, CSJ	
2002	Aaron Neville	Four time-Grammy Award-winning vocalist
2001	Cardinal Avery Dulles	Jesuit priest, theologian, and Catholic cardinal
2000	William H. Graham Sr.	Former Catholic University of America faculty member
1999	Kathryn J. DuFour	First female judge in the Maryland Circuit Courts and CUA benefactor
1998	Lindy Boggs	US Representative from Louisiana and United States Ambassador to the Holy See
1997	Henry Hyde	US Representative from Illinois
1997	Br. Patrick Ellis, FSC	De La Salle Christian Brother and president of the Catholic University of America
1996	Cardinal James Hickey	Former Archbishop of Washington, DC and chancellor of the Catholic University of America
1995	Robert P. Casey	Former Governor of Pennsylvania
1994	Antonin Scalia	Associate Justice of the Supreme Court of the United States
1994	Richard W. Galiher Sr.	Attorney and CUA benefactor
1993	Edward J. Pryzbyla	President, Edwards Enterprises, alumnus, benefactor
1992	George J. Quinn	Chairman, Alton Engineering, alumnus, benefactor
1991	William J. Byron	President, The Catholic University of America
1990	Eunice Kennedy Shriver	Executive Vice President, Joseph P. Kennedy, Jr. Foundation, Founding Chairwoman, Special Olympics International
1989	William D. Borders	Retired Archbishop of Baltimore
1988	Edward Bennett Williams	Attorney
1988	Admiral James D. Watkins	Former Chief of Naval Operations, former secretary of energy, former chairman of Reagan's HIV Task Force
1987	Philip M. Hannan	Archbishop of New Orleans, alumnus
1986	Nancy Reagan	Former First Lady of the United States of America
1985	Mildred Fay Jefferson	M.D., surgeon and pro-life leader
1985	Gilbert V. Hartke	Chairman Emeritus, The Catholic University of America Drama Department, alumnus
1984	Bruce Ritter	Founder, Covenant House
1983	None Awarded.	
1982	Raymond A. DuFour	president and chairman of the board, DuFour Enterprises, Inc., alumnus, benefactor
1981	John Tracy Ellis	Church historian, alumnus
1980	J. Peter Grace	Chief Executive Officer, W.R. Grace Co.
1980	William Cardinal Baum	Prefect, Sacred Congregation for Catholic Education in Rome, former chancellor of The Catholic University of America
1979	Terence Cardinal Cooke	Archbishop of New York, alumnus
1978	Clarence C. Walton	President, The Catholic University of America, alumnus
1977	Benjamin T. Rome	Chairman of the board, Hyman Construction Company, alumnus, benefactor
1976	Lawrence Cardinal Shehan	Archbishop of Baltimore
1975	John J. Sirica	Judge, U.S. District Court for the District of Columbia
1974	Michael Mansfield	U.S. Senator
1973	Helen Hayes	Actress
1972	Patrick Cardinal O'Boyle	Archbishop of Washington and chancellor of the university
1971	James Walsh	Superior General, Maryknoll Fathers
1970	Dr. Carroll Hochwalt	Former chairman, The Catholic University of America, Board of trustees
1969	Theodore M. Hesburgh, C.S.C.	President, University of Notre Dame, alumnus
1968	Danny Thomas	Entertainer
1967	James J. Norris	Assistant to the executive director, Catholic Relief Services
1966	Earl Warren	Chief Justice of the U.S. Supreme Court
1965	Sargent Shriver	Director, Peace Corps
1964	John A. McCone	Director, Central Intelligence Agency
1963	John W. McCormack	Speaker, U.S. House of Representatives
1962	Luke Edward Hart	Supreme Knight, Knights of Columbus
1961	Charles G. Fenwick	Director, Legal Affairs, Organization of American States
1960	Karl F. Herzfeld	Physicist
1959	General Alfred Gruenther	Past President, American Red Cross
1958	Thomas E. Murray	Consultant, Atomic Energy Commission
1957	Bryan J. McEntegart	Bishop of Brooklyn
1956	Ignatius Smith, O.P.	Dean, The Catholic University of America School of Philosophy
1956	John F. Kennedy	U.S. Senator (MA) (Later President of the United States of America)
1955	General Lawton Collins	Chief of Staff, U.S. Army
1954	J. Edgar Hoover	Director, Federal Bureau of Investigation
1953	Fulton J. Sheen	
1951	Fulton Oursler	Author, senior editor, Reader's Digest
1950	General Carlos Romulo	Secretary of Foreign Affairs, the Philippines
1949	Carlton J. H. Hayes	Professor, historian, publicist

== See also ==
- List of ecclesiastical decorations
