= None Less Than Heroes: The Honor Flight Story =

- Directed by: Ken Heckmann
- Written by: Marshall Riggan
- Narrated by: Gary Sinise
- Release date: November 1, 2011
- Running time: 43 minutes
- Country: United States
- Language: English

None Less Than Heroes: The Honor Flight Story is a 43-minute film about the sponsored flight of Iowa World War II veterans to Washington, D.C. in August 2010 to view the National World War II Memorial. This was only one of many such flights provided to veterans over a period of more than two years.

The documentary was written by Marshall Riggan, produced by Jeff Ballenger and Dean Nolen, produced and directed by Ken Heckman, with war footage from the National Archives, and narrated by actor Gary Sinise, it covers the August 15 through 18 trip to the Memorial, first showing them honored at a banquet hosted by Hy-Vee in Des Moines, Iowa, followed by their boarding a 747 Jumbo Jet, some in wheelchairs, others with oxygen tanks, then their arrival in D.C., greeted during their transport in buses from the airport by crowds waving flags and holding signs, their tour of the National World War II Memorial at the western end of the reflecting pool between the Washington Monument and the Lincoln Memorial, with stops at Arlington National Cemetery, the Vietnam War Memorial, the Korean War Memorial, the United States Marine Corps Pacific Memorial, and finally the return home.

Several interviews of veterans are interspersed during the film. Still and motion picture photography of war scenes are included.

The film was released on DVD in November 2011, with proceeds supposedly going to support "additional Honor Flights to Washington, D.C. for surviving World War II veterans."
