= Kathryn J. DuFour =

American judge

Kathryn J. DuFour (March 19, 1910 — February 4, 2005) was the first female judge in the Maryland Circuit Courts. The law library at The Catholic University of America is named in her honor.

== Early life and education ==
Born in Lawrence, Massachusetts, DuFour was a teenage actress, playing small roles for MGM and Fox Studios, until her mother forced her to stop acting and finish high school. After marrying a trial attorney and moving to Maryland, DuFour pursued law herself, graduating from the Washington College of Law at American University in 1935. After law school, she worked as a private attorney and for the Legal Aid Bureau and raised two children.

== Career ==
In 1950 she was elected to the Montgomery County Council. In 1953 she was appointed to the Maryland General Assembly by Governor Theodore McKeldin. In 1955 she was appointed as a judge in the Maryland Sixth Judicial Circuit Court. In 1967 she became the first female chief judge on the same circuit.
