= Gary Sinise =

American actor and activist (born 1955)

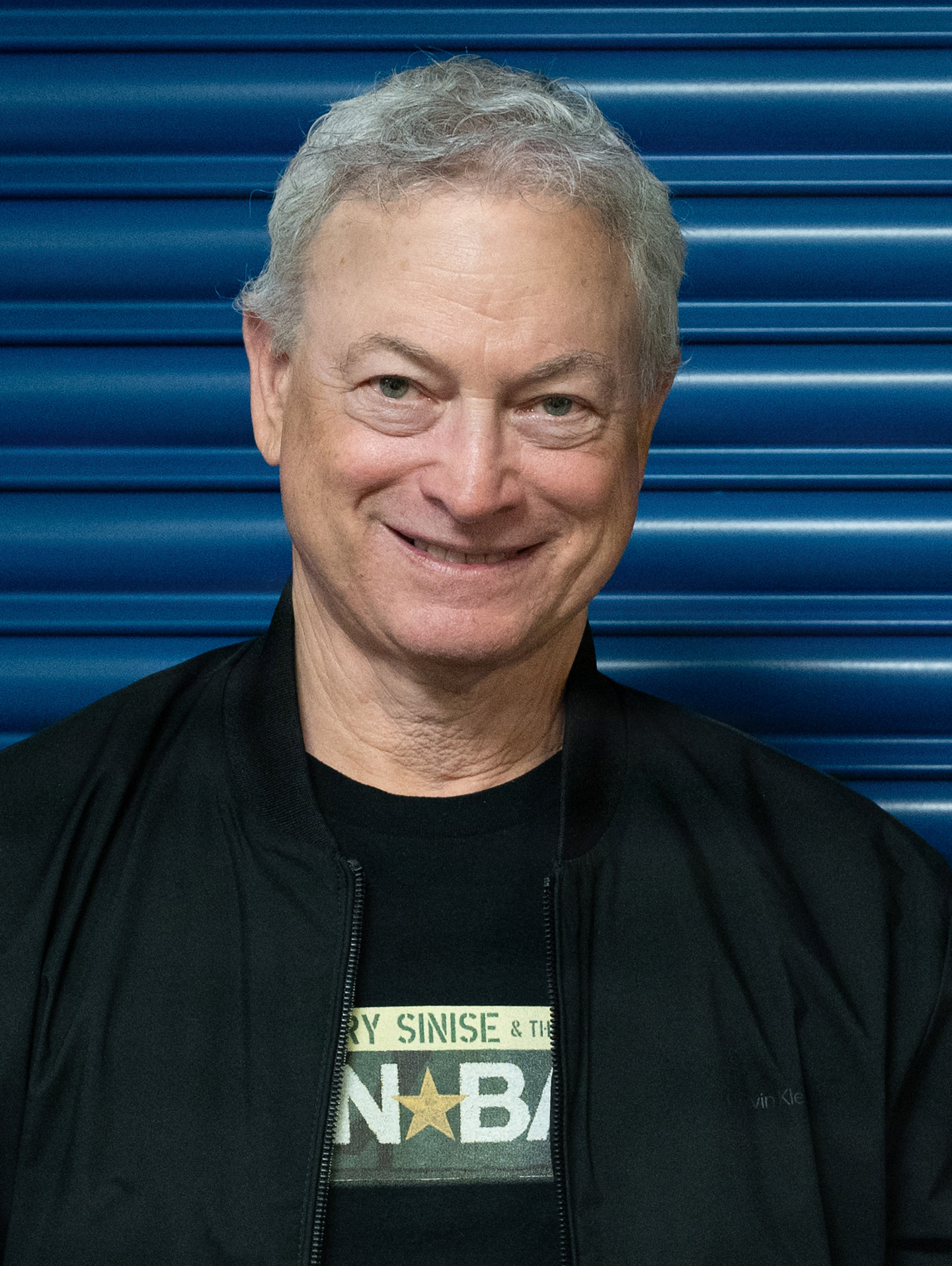
- Sinise in 2026
- Born: Gary Alan Sinise; March 17, 1955 (age 71); Blue Island, Illinois, U.S.
- Occupation: Actor
- Years active: 1973–2020
- Spouse: Moira Harris (m. 1981)
- Children: 3
- Awards: Full list

Gary Alan Sinise (/sɪˈniːs/; born March 17, 1955) is an American retired actor, director, musician, and activist. He has won a Tony Award, a Primetime Emmy Award, a Golden Globe Award, and three Actor Awards, and has been nominated for an Academy Award. He has received a star on the Hollywood Walk of Fame. Sinise has also received awards and honors for his extensive humanitarian work and involvement with charitable organizations, notably the Gary Sinise Foundation, of which he is the founder and chairman of the board of directors. He also founded the Lt. Dan Band (named after his character in Forrest Gump), which plays at U.S. military bases around the world.

Sinise's career began in 1974 at the age of nineteen with the Steppenwolf Theatre Company (which he co-founded). In 1983, he directed and starred in a production of Sam Shepard's True West for which he earned an Obie Award. Sinise directed Orphans by Lyle Kessler on Broadway in 1985. Also in 1985, he earned the Regional Theatre Tony Award alongside the Steppenwolf Theatre Company. Sinise also received Tony Award nominations for his performances in The Grapes of Wrath (1988) and One Flew Over the Cuckoo's Nest (2001).

Sinise and John Malkovich starred in the 1992 film adaptation of John Steinbeck's novel Of Mice and Men; Sinise also produced and directed the film. He received an Academy Award nomination for Best Supporting Actor for his portrayal of Lieutenant Dan Taylor in Forrest Gump (1994). He also appeared in Ron Howard's Apollo 13 (1995), Ransom (1996), Frank Darabont's The Green Mile (1999) and Impostor (2001).

On television, Sinise portrayed Harry S. Truman in Truman (1995), a portrayal that won him a Golden Globe Award and played the title role in George Wallace, for which he received a Primetime Emmy Award. Sinise is widely known for his leading role as Detective Mac Taylor in the long-running CBS series CSI: NY (2004–13). He also played Special Agent Jack Garrett in Criminal Minds: Beyond Borders (2016–17).

== Early life and education ==
Sinise was born in Blue Island, Illinois, the son of Robert L. Sinise (born 1931), a film editor, and Mylles (Alsip) Sinise. Sinise's great-grandfather, Vito Sinisi, emigrated to the United States from Ripacandida in the Italian region of Basilicata. Sinise received his secondary education in Illinois, briefly attending Glenbard West High School in Glen Ellyn, and later graduating from Highland Park High School in Highland Park.

He attended Illinois State University in Normal and has been a supportive alumnus of the university.

== Acting career ==
=== Early work (1974–1985) ===
In 1974, Sinise and two friends, Terry Kinney and Jeff Perry, founded the Steppenwolf Theatre Company in Chicago, Illinois. Since then, Steppenwolf has showcased the talents of notable actors such as Joan Allen, Kevin Anderson, Gary Cole, Ethan Hawke, Glenne Headly, John Malkovich, John Mahoney, Laurie Metcalf, Martha Plimpton, Jim True-Frost, and William Petersen. Sinise honed his acting and directing skills at Steppenwolf.

In 1982, Sinise's career began to take off when he directed and starred in Steppenwolf's production of True West. In 1983, he earned an Obie Award for his direction, and a year later appeared with John Malkovich in the PBS' American Playhouse production of the play. Sinise received a Joseph Jefferson Award for his direction of Lyle Kessler's play Orphans in 1985. In 1988, Sinise directed Miles from Home, a film starring Richard Gere, about two brothers' fight against the foreclosure of the family farm.

Sinise earned the Regional Theatre Tony Award alongside the Steppenwolf Theatre Company in 1985. He has received a total of four Tony Award nominations, including nominations for his performances in The Grapes of Wrath (1988) and One Flew Over the Cuckoo's Nest (2001).

=== Rise to prominence (1992–1994) ===
In 1992, Sinise starred in the film adaptation of John Steinbeck's classic novel Of Mice and Men, which he also directed and produced. Sinise played George Milton alongside John Malkovich, who played Lennie.

=== Breakthrough debuts (1994–2002) ===
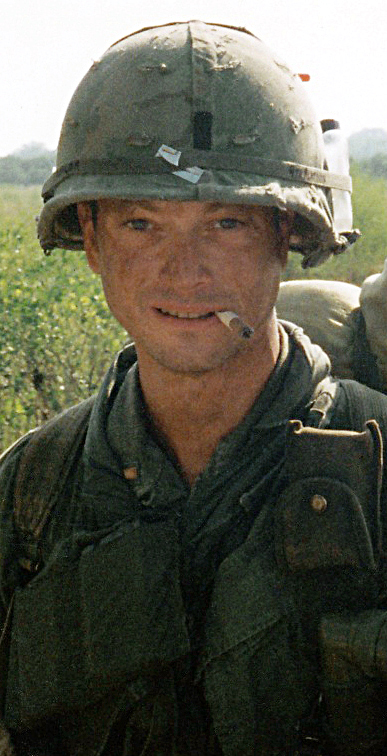
Sinise on the set of Forrest Gump, in 1993

Sinise's definitive breakthrough film role was Lieutenant Dan Taylor in Forrest Gump (1994). His performance earned him nominations for Academy Award for Best Supporting Actor, Golden Globe Best Supporting Actor – Motion Picture, Screen Actors Guild (SAG) Awards: Outstanding Performance by a Male Actor in a Supporting Role, and Chicago Film Critics Association: Best Supporting Actor.

Sinise portrayed Harry S. Truman in Truman (1995), a portrayal that won him a Golden Globe Award; and he played George Wallace in George Wallace (1997), for which he received a Primetime Emmy Award. He has also appeared in the Stephen King miniseries The Stand (1994), Ron Howard's Apollo 13 (1995), Ransom (1996), Snake Eyes (1998), Frank Darabont's The Green Mile (1999), Reindeer Games (2000), Mission to Mars (2000), and Impostor (2001). He narrated the audiobooks for John Steinbeck's Travels with Charley.

Sinise collaborated with fellow actor Tom Hanks three times, in Forrest Gump, Apollo 13, and The Green Mile.

=== Later acting (2002–2004) ===
Sinise reprised his role as Wallace in the television film Path to War (2002), about the Johnson administration's entry into the Vietnam War.

In late 2002, Sinise began appearing in Cadillac commercials, starting with the 2002–2003 Season's Best commercial. He was with the Break Through campaign from 2002 to 2006.

In 2004, Sinise began his first regular television series, in the crime drama CSI: NY, in which he plays Detective Mac Taylor. He was credited as a producer from season two onwards and wrote the storyline of an episode. Several episodes have allowed Sinise to demonstrate his musical prowess, including a season-two episode where Mac Taylor plays the bass guitar in a jazz club with musicians Kimo and Carol Williams and Danny Gottlieb, members of the Lt. Dan Band, which Sinise and Kimo Williams co-founded in 2003. The band is named for Sinise's character in Forrest Gump. The series ended in 2013.

=== Television (2003–2020) ===
Apart from his television and film work, Sinise appeared as the host of the Epcot ride Mission: SPACE at Walt Disney World, Orlando, Florida from 2003 to 2017, and as a model for Baume & Mercier watches.

Sinise was the narrator for the Discovery Channel's miniseries When We Left Earth in 2008. Sinise is the executive producer—along with David Scantling—of the Iraq War documentary Brothers at War. The film features an American military family and the experiences of three brothers: Jake Rademacher, Isaac Rademacher, and Joseph Rademacher.

In November 2009, Sinise narrated the highly acclaimed World War II in HD on the History Channel. Also in 2009, Sinise lent his voice talents in the Thomas Nelson audio Bible production known as The Word of Promise, playing the character of David. In 2010, he narrated the World War II documentary Missions That Changed the War on the Military Channel. In 2014, he narrated a Smithsonian Institution exhibit in the film Captain America: The Winter Soldier.

From 2016 to 2017, Sinise played Special Agent Jack Garrett in Criminal Minds: Beyond Borders.

On April 17, 2017, Sinise received a star on the Hollywood Walk of Fame for his work in the television industry. The star is located at 6664 Hollywood Boulevard.

On October 30, 2017, Sinise was selected as Grand Marshal of the Pasadena Tournament of Roses Parade, which took place on January 1, 2018.

Since his first appearance in 2000, Sinise has been a regular celebrity narrator at Disney's Candlelight Processional, appearing once at Disneyland in 2011 and fifteen times at Epcot (beginning in 2000, until most recently in 2025).

=== Retirement (2020) ===
He retired from acting in 2020 to focus full-time on his family following concurrent cancer diagnoses for his wife and his son, McCanna "Mac" Anthony Sinise, who died in January 2024.

== Later life ==
=== Activism ===
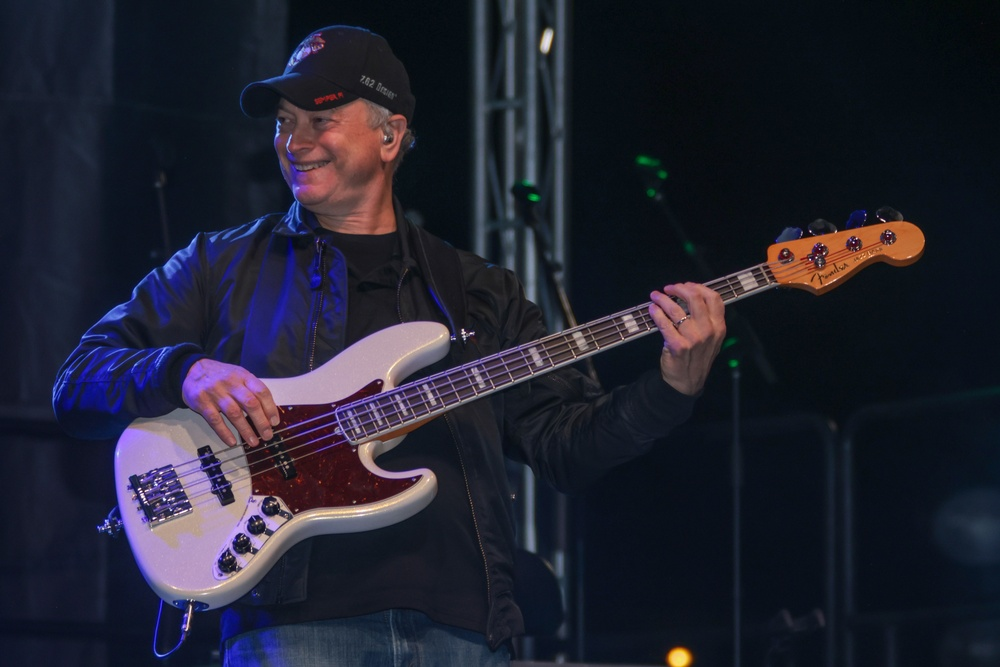
Sinise playing bass guitar in the Lt. Dan Band in 2024

Sinise co-founded Operation Iraqi Children. Sinise said, "Iraq is in the news every day, and most of it is bad. But there are some positive stories. And how our soldiers are rebuilding schools and helping kids is one of them."

Sinise was awarded the Presidential Citizens Medal by President George W. Bush for work he did supporting the U.S. military and humanitarian work supporting Iraqi children. He narrated Army and Army Reserve Army Strong recruitment ads in late 2008.

Sinise is a supporter of various veterans' organizations, both personally and through the Lt. Dan Band. He frequently performs on USO tours at military bases around the world and volunteered for the National Vietnam Veterans Arts Museum now called the National Veterans Art Museum. Since 2003, Gary Sinise has visited 174 military bases and 21 military hospitals around the world.

Sinise is also on the Advisory Council of Hope for the Warriors, a national nonprofit dedicated to providing a full cycle of nonmedical care to combat-wounded service members, their families, and families of the fallen from each military branch. Sinise narrates the audiobook of John Steinbeck's Of Mice and Men which was released on April 13, 2011. In December 2011, Sinise was the narrator at the Candelight Processional at Disneyland.

In August 2012, Sinise was honored at the United States Navy Memorial, by Master Chief Petty Officer of the Navy (MCPON) Rick West and was made an honorary U.S. Navy Chief Petty Officer for his efforts in helping veterans. On August 29, 2013, he was named an honorary Marine by the Commandant of the Marine Corps. In 2006, Sinise began co-hosting the National Memorial Day Concert on the Mall in Washington, D.C., with actor and Illinois native Joe Mantegna.

He serves as the national spokesperson for the American Veterans Disabled for Life Memorial and spends much of his time raising awareness for the memorial and other veterans' service organizations. In 2012, he was honored by the Joe Foss Institute for his dedication to veterans.

In 2013, he was awarded the third highest honor within the Department of the Army Civilian Awards, the Outstanding Civilian Service Award, for substantial contributions to the U.S. Army community through his work with the Gary Sinise Foundation. Each year the foundation raises over $30 million which it uses to benefit military veterans, including building smart homes for those who are disabled. He participated in Troopathon VI for 2013, as he has in the past, to help raise money for care packages for American troops.

He received the 2015 Sylvanus Thayer Award, awarded by the West Point Association of Graduates to a non-West Point graduate whose character, service, and achievements reflect the ideals prized by the U.S. Military Academy.

In 2019, a video went viral of Gary Sinise reacting to a video of active duty service men and women, veterans, first responders, their families, and Colin Powell, Tom Hanks, Robert De Niro, Ron Howard, Steve Buscemi, Jay Leno, Tim Allen, Rob Lowe, Judd Apatow and Robin Roberts giving thanks to Sinise for all his humanitarian work.

In 2020, the Location Managers Guild honored Sinise with its Humanitarian award at their annual awards ceremony in recognition of the work he does with the Gary Sinise Foundation. In accepting the award, Sinise read a quote from President Calvin Coolidge saying, "The nation which forgets its defenders will itself be forgotten".

On April 16, 2021, Sinise hosted the inauguration ceremony of the World War I memorial in Washington, D.C.

In 2026, Sinise co-hosted, with Mary McCormack, the 37th annual National Memorial Day Concert from the West Lawn of the U.S. Capitol on the U.S. Semiquincentennial.

== Personal life ==
Sinise married actress Moira Harris in 1981. She was diagnosed with breast cancer in 2018 and as of 2024 she is cancer-free. They have three children.

His son, McCanna "Mac" Anthony Sinise, was diagnosed in 2018 with chordoma, a rare cancer of the spine. He died on January 5, 2024, and was laid to rest on January 23, 2024, in a Catholic service. Mac was a musician who had worked for his father's charitable foundation, and before his death had completed work on an album Resurrection & Revival.

In 2003, Sinise was awarded an honorary Doctorate of Humane Letters by Amherst College. He was awarded an honorary Doctor of Fine Arts degree by California State University, Stanislaus in 2008.

Sinise is a devoted fan of the Chicago Cubs and the Chicago Bears. He is also a fan of the band Kansas.

=== Religious views ===
Sinise is a practicing Catholic. He converted to the faith on December 24, 2010, following his wife, Moira, who was raised Catholic and re-converted in 2000.

=== Political views ===
In 2004, Sinise founded Friends of Abe, a support and networking group for conservative members of Hollywood.

In May 2009, Nicolle Wallace, a former adviser to George W. Bush and John McCain, mentioned Sinise as a potential Republican presidential candidate in 2012. Sinise narrates the online virtual tour of the Ronald Reagan Presidential Library and spoke at the centennial celebration of Ronald Reagan's birth at the library in February 2011.

In September 2012, Sinise donated to Republican presidential nominee Mitt Romney.

Sinise's Republican-leaning views have been written into the character of Mac Taylor on CSI: NY. Taylor has a picture of Reagan displayed in his office and was once the subject of a joke by one of his colleagues about an eight-hour Reagan documentary he watched over and over again.

==== Views on Trump ====
Despite being a lifelong supporter of the Republican Party, Sinise refused to endorse or vote for Donald Trump in the 2016 presidential election, or in the 2024 election and also criticized Trump after the then-candidate questioned McCain's status as a war hero because he was captured as a prisoner of war.

== Awards and honors ==
=== Humanitarian awards ===
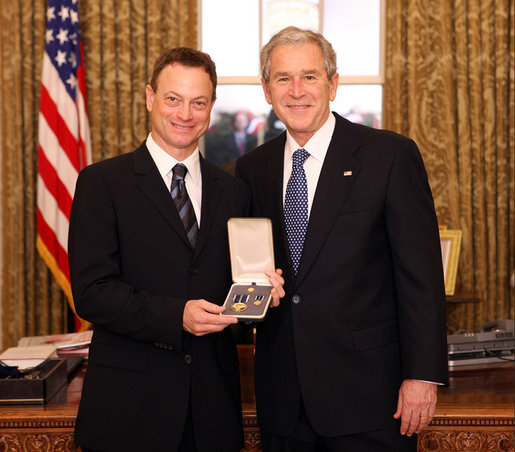
Sinise with President George W. Bush after receiving the Presidential Citizens Medal in 2008

Over the years, Sinise has received numerous honors for his humanitarian work and his work on behalf of military veterans and their families.

- 2007 – the Bob Hope Award for Excellence in Entertainment
- 2008 – the Presidential Citizens Medal by President George W. Bush.
- 2008 – Ellis Island Medal of Honor from the National Ethnic Coalition
- 2008 – Honorary Doctorate of Fine Arts from Cal State Stanislaus
- 2009 – Spirit of the USO Award from the USO
- 2012 – Boy Scouts of America Leader of the Year
- 2012 – United States Navy, Honorary Chief Petty Officer
- 2012 – Spirit of Hope Award from Department of Defense
- 2013 – Civic Statesmanship Award by the U.S. Association of Former Members of Congress
- 2013 – Honorary Marine by the United States Marine Corps
- 2015 – Sylvanus Thayer Award from the West Point Association of Graduates
- 2016 – Honorary Battalion Chief by the FDNY
- 2017 – James Cardinal Gibbons Medal from The Catholic University of America
- 2017 - George Catlett Marshall Medal Award from the Association of the United States Army (AUSA)
- 2018 – The Kennedy Center Award for the Human Spirit (Citizen Artist)
- 2018 – American Spirit Award from The National WWII Museum
- 2018 – Grand marshal of the Tournament of Roses Parade
- 2019 – The Eisenhower Award from Business Executives for National Security
- 2019 – Marine Corps League Honorary Membership
- 2020 – Honorary Graduate by the United States Naval Academy
- 2020 – The Congressional Medal of Honor Society Patriot Award

== Filmography ==
=== Film ===
Year	Title	Role	Notes
1978	A Wedding	Extra	Uncredited
1988	Miles from Home	—N/a	Director
1992	Of Mice and Men	George Milton	Also director and producer
1992	A Midnight Clear	Vance "Mother" Wilkins	
1992	The Witness	Young Soldier	Short film
1993	Jack the Bear	Norman Strick	
1994	Forrest Gump	Lieutenant Dan Taylor	Breakthrough role
1995	Apollo 13	Ken Mattingly	
1995	The Quick and the Dead	Marshal McKenzie	
1996	Ransom	Detective Jimmy Shaker	
1996	Albino Alligator	Milo	
1998	Snake Eyes	Commander Kevin Dunne	
1999	The Green Mile	Burt Hammersmith	
1999	It's the Rage	Morgan	
2000	Bruno	Dino Battaglia	
2000	Mission to Mars	Jim McConnell	
2000	Reindeer Games	Gabriel Mercer	
2001	Impostor	Spencer Olham	Also producer
2002	A Gentleman's Game	Foster Pearse	
2002	Made-Up	Duncan Tivey	
2003	The Human Stain	Nathan Zuckerman	
2003	Mission: SPACE	Capcom	Short film
2004	The Forgotten	Dr. Jack Munce	
2004	The Big Bounce	Ray Ritchie	
2005	Magnificent Desolation: Walking on the Moon 3D	Gene Cernan	Voice
2006	Open Season	Shaw	Voice
2009	Beyond All Boundaries	Ernie Pyle	Voice; short film
2011	None Less Than Heroes: The Honor Flight Story	Narrator	Documentary
2011	Lt. Dan Band: For The Common Good	Himself	Documentary
2014	Captain America: The Winter Soldier	Smithsonian Narrator	Voice
2016	Beyond Glory	Military Voice	Voice
2019	Sgt. Will Gardner	Larry	
2020	I Still Believe	Tom Camp	
2020	Joe Bell	Sheriff Westin	

=== Television ===
Year(s)	Title	Role	Notes
1980	Knots Landing	Lee Maddox	Episode: "Small Surprises"
1984	Family Secrets	Motorcyclist	Television film
1984	True West	Austin	American Playhouse broadcast of play
1986–87	Crime Story	Howie Dressler	2 episodes
1989	The Final Days	Richard Ben-Veniste	Television film
1989	Hunter	Lord Rutherford	Episode: "Lullabye"
1989	My Name Is Bill W.	Ebby	Hallmark Hall of Fame television film
1991	The Grapes of Wrath	Tom Joad	American Playhouse broadcast of play
1994	The Stand	Stu Redman	Miniseries; 4 episodes
1995	Truman	Harry S. Truman	Television film
1995	Frasier	Sid	Episode: "The Club"; voice only
1997	George Wallace	George C. Wallace	Television film
1999	That Championship Season	Tom Daley	Television film
2002	Path to War	George Wallace	Television film, uncredited
2003	Fallen Angel	Terry McQuinn	Television film
2004–05	CSI: Miami	Detective Mac Taylor	Episodes: "MIA/NYC NonStop", "Felony Flight"
2004–13	CSI: NY	Detective Mac Taylor	Lead role, also producer
2008	When We Left Earth	Narrator	Documentary miniseries; 6 episodes
2009	WWII in HD	Narrator	Documentary miniseries; 10 episodes
2010–12	Missions That Changed the War	Narrator	14 episodes
2013	CSI: Crime Scene Investigation	Detective Mac Taylor	Episode: "In Vino Veritas"
2015	Criminal Minds	Agent Jack Garrett	Episode: "Beyond Borders"
2016–17	Criminal Minds: Beyond Borders	Agent Jack Garrett	Lead role, also producer
2020	13 Reasons Why	Dr. Robert Ellman	Lead role (Season 4); 10 episodes.

=== Theater ===
Year	Title	Role	Notes
1984	True West	Austin	Cherry Lane Theatre, Broadway
1984	Balm in Gilead	Dopey	Circle Repertory Theatre
1985	The Caretaker	Mick	Steppenwolf Theatre Company
1986	The Caretaker	Mick	Circle in the Square Theatre
1990	The Grapes of Wrath	Tom Joad	Cort Theatre, Broadway
1997	A Streetcar Named Desire	Stanley Kowalski	Steppenwolf Theatre Company
2000	One Flew Over the Cuckoo's Nest	Randle McMurphy	Steppenwolf Theatre Company
2001	One Flew Over the Cuckoo's Nest	Randle McMurphy	Royale Theatre, Broadway

=== Video game ===
Year	Title	Voice
2008	CSI: NY	Detective Mac Taylor

=== Music video ===
Year	Title	Artist
2026	Gary	Stephen Wilson Jr.

== Bibliography ==
- Sinise, Gary; Brotherton, Marcus (2019). Grateful American: A Journey from Self to Service. Nashville: Thomas Nelson. ISBN 978-1-40020-812-8.
