= Brothers at War =

- Theatrical release poster
- Directed by: Jake Rademacher
- Produced by: Norman S. Powell; Jake Rademacher; Gary Sinise (Executive Producer); David Scantling (Executive Producer)
- Starring: Jake Rademacher; CPT Isaac Rademacher; SGT Joseph Rademacher
- Cinematography: Marc Miller; Conor Colwell
- Edited by: Robert DeMaio
- Music by: Lee Holdridge
- Distributed by: Samuel Goldwyn Films; Summit Entertainment
- Release date: March 13, 2009
- Running time: 112 minutes
- Country: United States
- Language: English

Brothers at War is a 2009 documentary film directed by Jake Rademacher and produced by Rademacher and Norman S. Powell. The film follows several US soldiers in the Iraq War. The film's executive producers are Gary Sinise and David Scantling. Brothers at War won the Best Documentary Feature Award at the 2008 GI Film Festival. The film features an original score by Lee Holdridge and an original song--"Brothers in Arms"—by John Ondrasik of Five for Fighting.

== Synopsis ==
Filmmaker Jake Rademacher sets out to understand the motivation, sacrifice and experience of his two younger brothers, Isaac and Joe, serving in Iraq. The film depicts the toll the life-threatening work and separation take on the parents, siblings, wives and children of the soldiers. As the film develops, however, it becomes clear that an underlying motivation for Jake is to prove himself to his brothers, and to himself. Jake thought of joining the military as a youth, but was never a candidate for selection. A year behind him, Isaac was studious, athletic and an Eagle Scout, and was offered an acceptance at West Point. Joe is many years younger than the two older boys, and enlisted. In Iraq Joe performs overwatch duties as a sniper. Though not under his command, Joe ended up serving in the 82nd Airborne Division, the same unit in which Isaac serves as an officer.

The film follows Jake as he arrives in Iraq at Isaac's unit. Jake is a bit of a distraction to Isaac, who assigns him an embed position with one of his units. Jake has to adjust to life in a combat zone, and goes out with reconnaissance troops on the Syrian border and visits sniper "hide sites" in the Sunni Triangle. After a month of fairly safe postings in country Jake comes home. There he realizes what he has collected fails to tell the story he is looking for. He returns to Iraq, where he is embedded with an Iraqi unit whose US military advisors have encountered embeds before and distrust him, calling him 'Johnny Press'. It is with this unit that Rademacher comes under fire, encounters casualties, and develops an appreciation for the commitment and loss. Returning home the second time, Jake has a much better understanding with his two brothers.

== Cast ==
- Mahmoud Hamid Ali as himself
- Edward Allier as himself
- Zach Corke as himself
- Danelle Fields as herself
- Ben Fisher as himself
- Kevin Keniston as himself
- Frank McCann as himself
- Brandon 'Mongo' Phillips as himself
- Claus Rademacher as himself
- Isaac Rademacher as himself
- Jake Rademacher as himself
- Jenny Rademacher as herself
- Joseph Rademacher as himself
- Robert Smallwood as himself
- Kevin Turner as himself
