= Isaac Rademacher =

Recipient of the Bronze Star (born 1977)

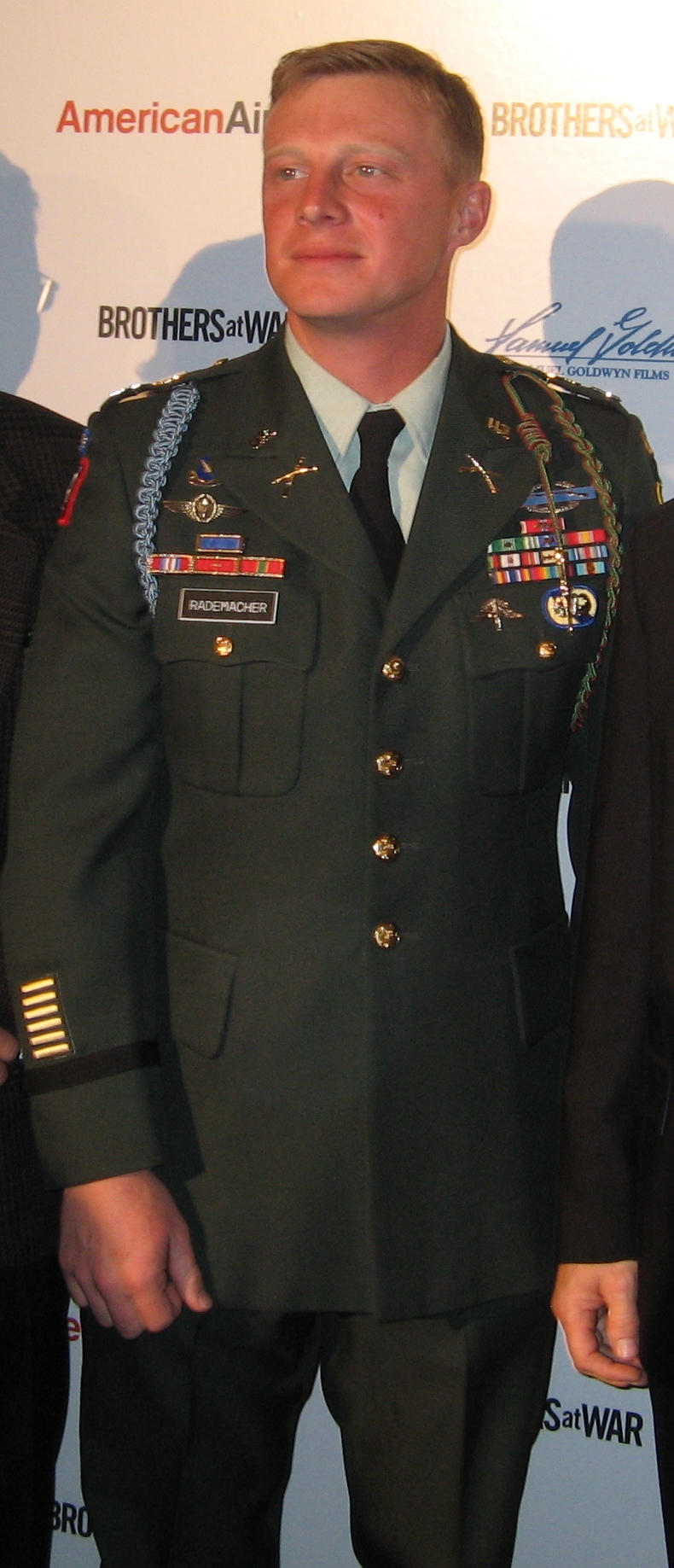
- Isaac Rademacher in 2009
- Born: March 10, 1977 (age 49)
- Military career
- Allegiance: United States
- Branch: United States Army
- Service years: 1996–present
- Rank: Lt. Colonel
- Unit: 82nd Airborne Division
- Conflicts: Operation Iraqi Freedom; Operation Enduring Freedom
- Awards: Combat Infantryman Badge; Bronze Star (3 Oak Leaf Clusters); Army Commendation Medal (1 Oak Leaf Cluster)
- Other work: Brothers at War

Isaac Rademacher (born March 10, 1977) is a United States Army Lieutenant Colonel and a 2000 graduate of the United States Military Academy at West Point, New York. Rademacher grew up in Decatur, Illinois.

Isaac Rademacher was featured in the documentary Brothers at War, which was directed and produced by his brother, Jake.

== Military experience ==
Isaac Rademacher reported to the United States Military Academy at West Point in the summer of 1996 and graduated in the Class of 2000. Among his honors was the General John Pershing Award for graduating at the top of his class in military tactics and studies. The day after graduation, Isaac married the former Jennifer Eilen, a fellow West Point classmate. Isaac was commissioned in the Infantry and attended the Infantry officer basic course at Fort Benning, Georgia, while his wife attended the Ordnance officer basic course in Aberdeen, Maryland.

Upon completion of the officer basic course, Isaac attended and graduated the Army Ranger school in the spring of 2001.

Isaac and Jennifer Rademacher were assigned to the 82nd Airborne Division at Fort Bragg. Isaac in the 1-504th Parachute Infantry Regiment and Jennifer in the 782nd Main Support Battalion. Isaac served as an Airborne Infantry Platoon Leader for two years and spent the last six months with his platoon in Operation Enduring Freedom in Afghanistan in 2002–2003. Upon his return, Jennifer deployed to Kuwait in early 2003 in order to support the start of the war in Iraq.

Following Jennifer's return in the summer of 2003, he deployed to Fallujah, Iraq as the Battalion S-5, responsible for the civil-military operations within his battalion's area of responsibility. Isaac returned in February 2004 in time for the birth of his daughter, Hunter, in April. In the fall of 2004, Rademacher deployed to northwestern Iraq with the F Company, 51st Infantry Regiment – the XVIII Airborne Corps Long Range Surveillance Company. One of his brothers Jake joined him on this deployment in the summer of 2005 as part of the filming of Brothers at War.

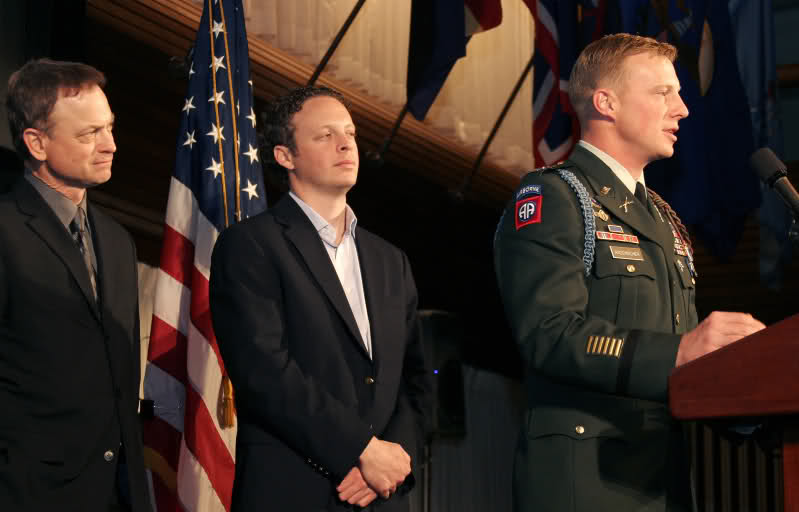
Rademacher at the premier of Brothers At War

Returning home in the fall of 2005 from his Operation Iraqi Freedom tour, Rademacher attended the Infantry Captain's Career Course in Fort Benning. Upon completion, he returned to Fort Bragg and assumed command of the Long Range Surveillance Company. After a year of training, he deployed in the summer of 2007 as the commander of the Long Range Surveillance Company to Northern Iraq for a fifteen-month deployment.

Rademacher has completed three combat tours in Iraq in support of Operation Iraqi Freedom and one combat tour in Afghanistan in support of Operation Enduring Freedom. He has completed Ranger School and earned Airborne and HALO Military Freefall wings.

== Awards and decorations ==

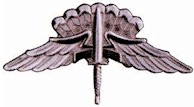
