= 2nd Brigade Special Troops Battalion =

Special Troops Battalion, 2nd Brigade, 1st Cavalry Division
- Insignia
- Country: US
- Part of: 2nd Brigade, 1st Cavalry Division, III Armored Corps, FORSCOM
- Installation: Fort Hood, TX
- Nickname: "Spartans"
- Motto: "Perstatum Fortitudo Bellatoris"
- Colors: Black and gold
- Website: http://www.hood.army.mil/1stcavdiv/units/2bct/bstb/

Commanders
- Lieutenant Colonel: Archie S. Herndon, Jr.
- Command Sergeant-Major (CSM): Roderick K. Jones

The 2nd Brigade Special Troops Battalion is a battalion stationed at Fort Hood.

== Insignia ==
A gold color metal and enamel device 1 1/8 inches (2.9 cm) in height overall consisting of a shield blazoned: Per pale Sable and Gules with stylized folds Sanguine; in the first three lightning flashes conjoined and radiating from base point Or; in the second a stylized demi-Spartan shield of the like garnished Tenné and Bronze; overall a sword in pale Argent (Silver Gray) with hilt and handguard Azure (Teal); a bordure of the fourth two bars enhanced of the first. Attached around the sides and bottom of the shield is a Black tripartite scroll inscribed with "PERSTATUM FORTITUDO BELLATORIS" in Gold.

Symbolism: Gold (Yellow) recalls the Cavalry lineage of the unit. Gold is also emblematic of excellence and high achievement. The two horizontal black bars allude to wrought iron, inherent with Armor and the unit's numerical designation "2nd." The Spartan sword or Xiphos represents the unit's courage, vigilance and preparedness to stand and fight at a moment's notice. The blue of the hilt is for loyalty. The Spartan shield signifies the unit's ability to receive and organize multiple attachments for combat and remain constantly ready to support global military operations. Red symbolizes valor, sacrifice and is the color of the Spartan warrior's cape. The Spartan army was one of the toughest on record and served as the standard for valor. The lightning flashes highlight the organization's inherent ability to support tactical missions with Intelligence, Signal and Military Police capabilities. The contrast of black and gold underscores the night and day, around the clock mission of the Special Troops Battalion.

Background: The distinctive unit insignia was approved on 4 October 2005.

== Unit history ==
Special Troops Battalion, 2nd Brigade, 1st Cavalry Division, "Spartans", commanded by LTC Kenneth Crawford and CSM Michael Cooke, was activated on 8 July 2005 in response to the US Army's UA / UE concept of fielding its vision of "The Objective Force". The battalion is composed of a headquarters company (old HHC, 91 EN) (with an organic MP platoon, NBC recon platoon, and support platoon), a Military Intelligence company (old B Co, 312 MI), a Signal company (old B Co, 13SIG), and an Engineer company thereby making it the primary support node for Blackjack Brigade. The Spartan battalion is capable of receiving multiple combat, combat support, and combat service support modules in support of full spectrum and support operations worldwide.

On 4 Sep., 2BSTB deployed to New Orleans, LA. in response to Hurricane Katrina. The primary mission of this deployment was to render aide to displaced civilians, provide a patrolling force to deter rioting and criminal activity, and assist local law officials and government organizations to safeguard and protect the neighborhood of Algiers within the greater New Orleans area.

== Deployment ==
The unit has been deployed to Iraq and Afghanistan in support of 2d ABCT, 1st Cavalry Division.
