= Gary Sinise Foundation =

American veterans' support charity

- Founder: Gary Sinise
- Type: Nonprofit 501(c)(3) Corporation
- Headquarters: Franklin, Tennessee, U.S.
- Website: www.garysinisefoundation.org

The Gary Sinise Foundation is a charity and veterans service organization that offers a variety of programs, services and events for wounded veterans of the military. It operates as a nonprofit 501(c)(3) organization. Among its programs is the construction of specially adapted smart homes for severely wounded veterans that are provided mortgage-free. Since 2011 the Gary Sinise Foundation has raised over $400 million for wounded veterans, first responders, and their families.

The organization was founded in 2011 by actor Gary Sinise. The foundation serves all branches of the military at U.S. installations domestically and abroad.

As of April 2024, the Gary Sinise Foundation has built 94 specially adapted smart homes for severely wounded heroes, served more than 1,000,000 meals to serving servicemen across the country, and organised around 500 support concerts for serving servicemen sponsored by the foundation.

As of 2026, the foundation has built 104 homes, served 1,439,622 appreciation meals and held 622 Lt. Dan Band concerts.

The organization also sponsors educational trips and outreach for students and veterans.

== History ==
Having grown up in a family of veterans, Sinise has been involved with supporting military veterans going back as early as the 1970s. After the September 11, 2001 terrorist attacks, Sinise became more actively involved in supporting the military.

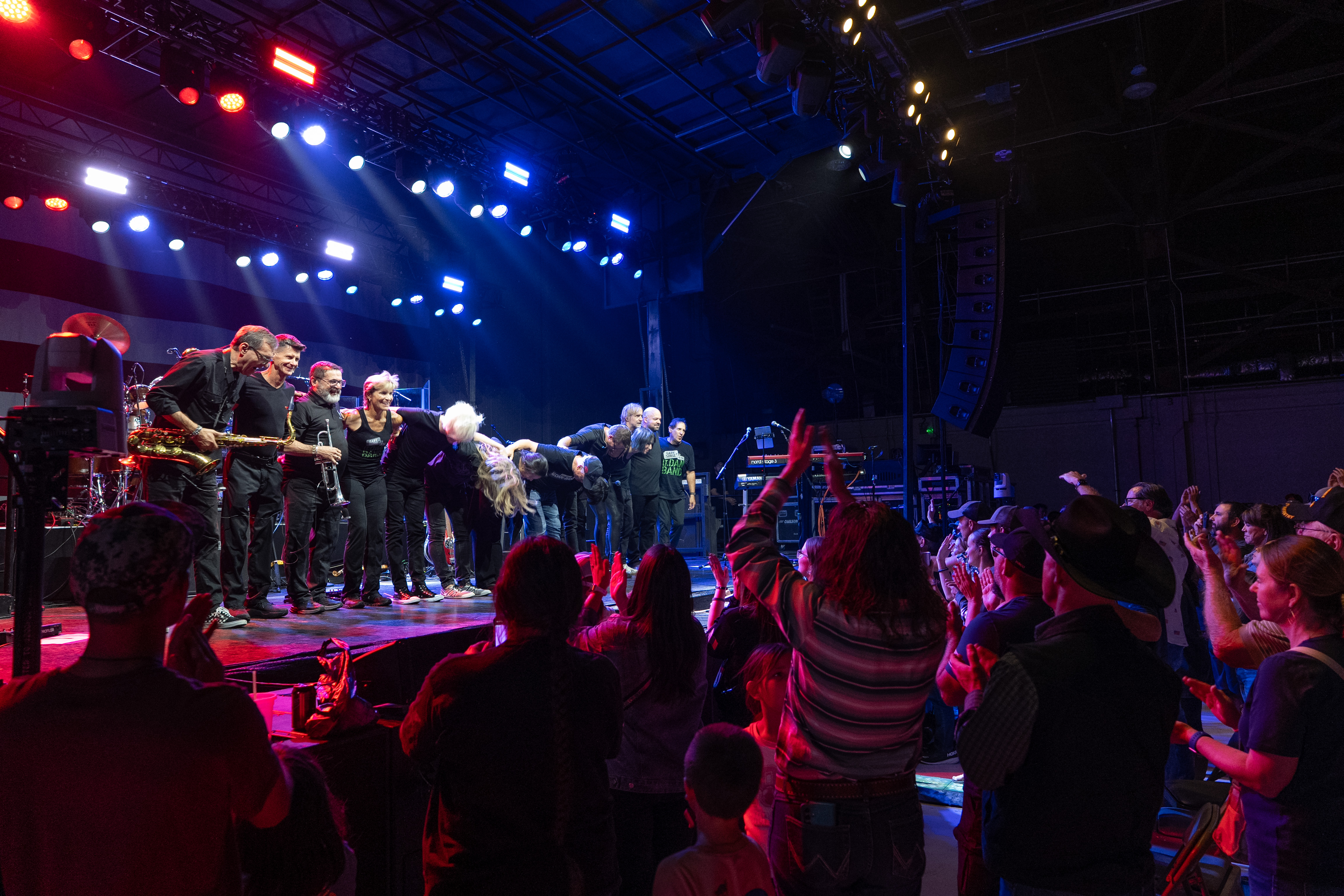
Gary Sinise & the Lieutenant Dan Band at Kingsley Field Air National Guard Base in 2025

In 2004, Sinise started the Gary Sinise & the Lieutenant Dan Band a cover band that has played over 500 shows around the world, visiting active-duty soldiers including Iraq and Afghanistan. The band has also performed for members of the military and their families to entertain troops and raise money for disabled veterans.

Since 2018, the foundation has been working together with Walt Disney World to offer an annual Snowball Express healing retreat for families of fallen U.S. military heroes. In 2023, the program was expanded with an additional week, and in 2024 there were more than 2,500 participants in the two weeks.

On April 26, 2022, the foundation announced its headquarters would move from Los Angeles, California, to Franklin, Tennessee, in the mid-year.

In the year 2024, the Foundation reported total revenues, gains, and other support amounting to $86,027,376, while total functional expenses were recorded at $76,162,960.

On 5 September 2025, the Soaring Valor took its final flight after 10 years of being implemented. The program was a partnership between the Gary Sinise Foundation, the National WWII Museum and American Airlines that provided more than 30 charter flights for World War II veterans.

On September 18, 2025, the Pittsburgh Pirates pitcher Paul Skenes and foundation representatives presented a total of more than $100,000 in equipment grants to local departments for responders in the Pittsburgh area.

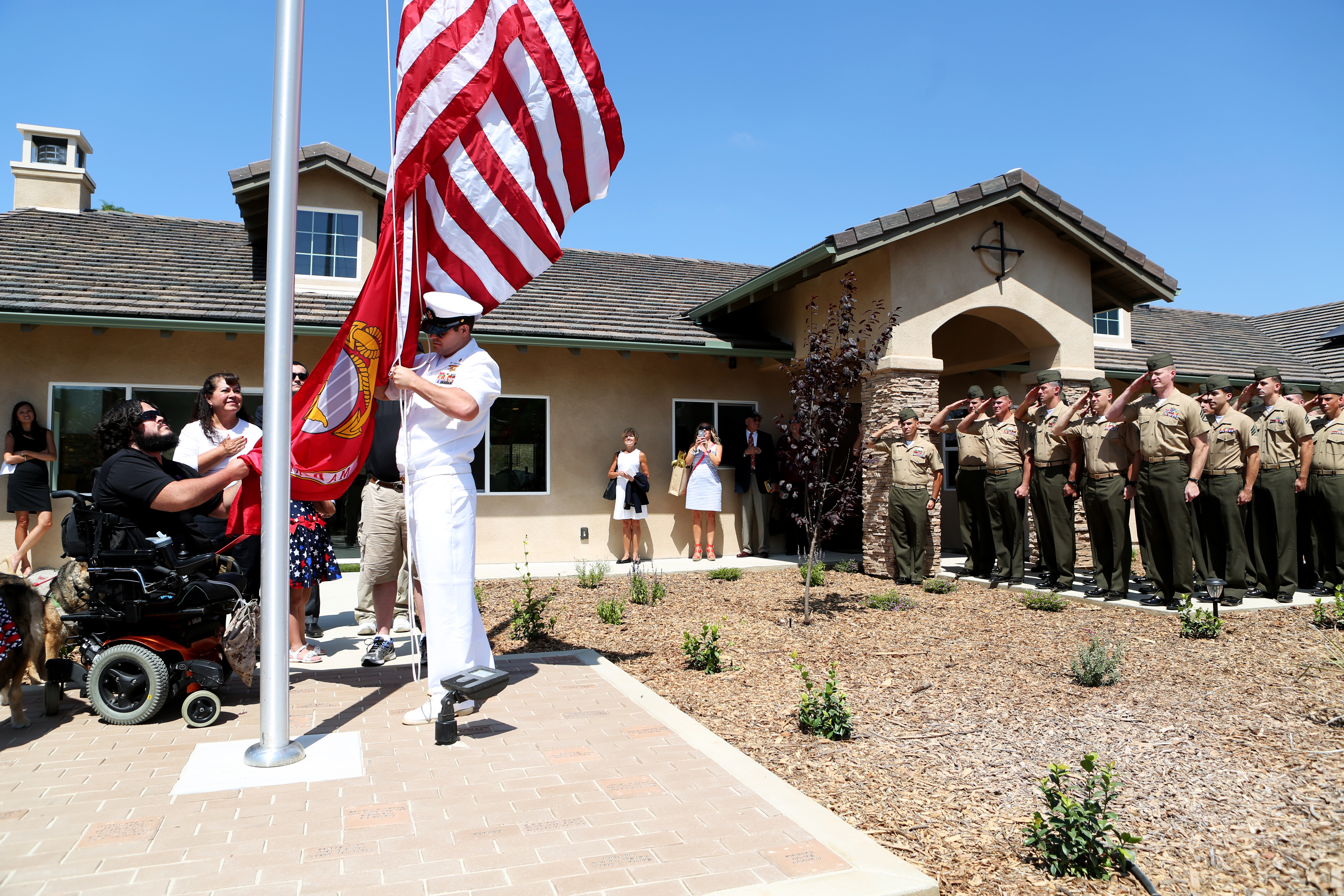
Gary Sinise Foundation dedicates new smart home to wounded Marine veteran

In November 2025, the foundation reached a milestone by constructing its 100th specially adapted, mortgage-free home for a wounded veteran. This home was donated to retired U.S. Army Sergeant First Class Joe Bowser through the foundation's R.I.S.E. program.

The foundation constructed 12 more smart homes as part of the R.I.S.E. program, with a total budgeted cost of approximately $12.605 million.

In November 2025, the foundation provided $1 million to CreatiVets for the purchase of a former Nashville church to be used as a 24-hour arts center for veterans.

In 2025, the foundation reported $91,083,600 in total revenues, gains, and other support ad well as $89,011,140 in total assets.

Charity Navigator listed the foundation with a four star rating and an A rating in April 2025.
