= Lt. Dan Band =

American cover band originally formed in Chicago

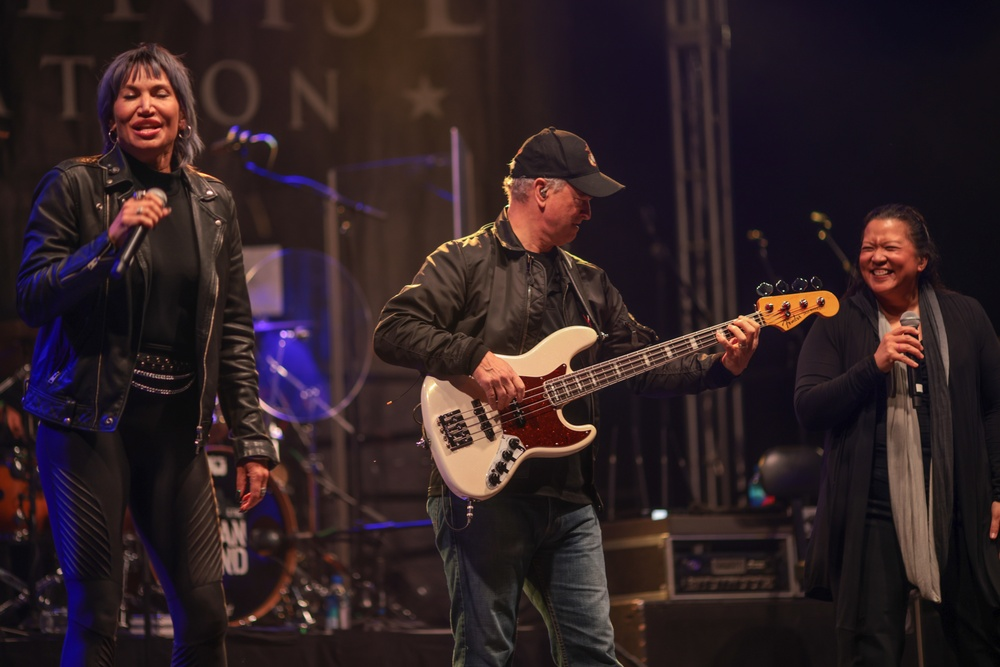
- MCAS Beaufort, 2024

Background information
- Origin: Chicago, Illinois, U.S.
- Genres: Rock, pop
- Years active: 2003–present
- Members: Gary Sinise; Gina Gonzalez; Mari Anne Jayme; Jeff Vezain; Kirk Garrison; Danny Gottlieb; Beth Gottlieb; Dan Myers; Ernie Denov; Ben Lewis; Mitch Paliga; Julie Dutchak; Molly Callinan; Tom “Bones” Malone
- Past members: Carol Williams; Daniel Jeux; Kimo Williams
- Website: www.ltdanband.com

The Lt. Dan Band is an American cover band originally formed in Chicago in 2003 by Gary Sinise and Kimo Williams to perform at USO shows, entertain troops, and raise money for disabled veterans. The band is named after the character Lieutenant Dan Taylor, whom Sinise portrayed in the film Forrest Gump. Sinise has said in interviews that many people recognize him as "Lieutenant Dan" rather than by his real name, hence the band's name. The concept came about when Sinise asked for permission to bring musicians on his USO tours. The group was initially known as "Gary Sinise and the Lt. Dan Band". By September 2025, the group had played 600 shows, counting from their first performance at Great Lakes Naval Base in November 2003.

The Lt. Dan Band has grown from the occasional jam session and Chicago-area gigs to performing for charities and non-profit organizations including the United Service Organizations (USO) and Operation Iraqi Children, the latter of which was co-founded by Sinise in March 2004. In 2011, a documentary was released regarding the band and Sinise's work to benefit veterans. They frequently visit military bases in the United States and abroad.

Sinise was involved in building a memorial to America's three million, living, disabled veterans. Completed in 2014, the American Veterans Disabled for Life Memorial was built due to the efforts of Sinise and the band championing the cause of the Disabled American Veterans.

== Awards ==
For his humanitarian work, Sinise has received the Bob Hope Award for Excellence in Entertainment, the Spirit of the USO Award, Sylvanus Thayer Award, Doughboy Award, Dwight D. Eisenhower Award, and the Ellis Island Medal of Honor. He was given the Presidential Citizens Medal in 2008.

== Gallery ==
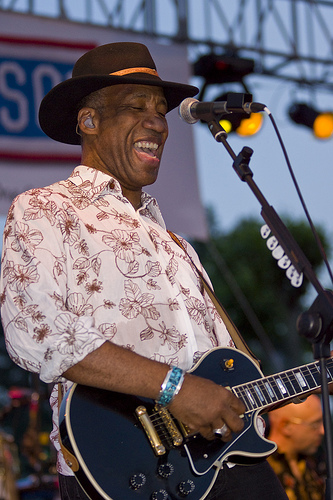
Kimo Williams playing lead guitar on June 26, 2009 (June 26, 2009)

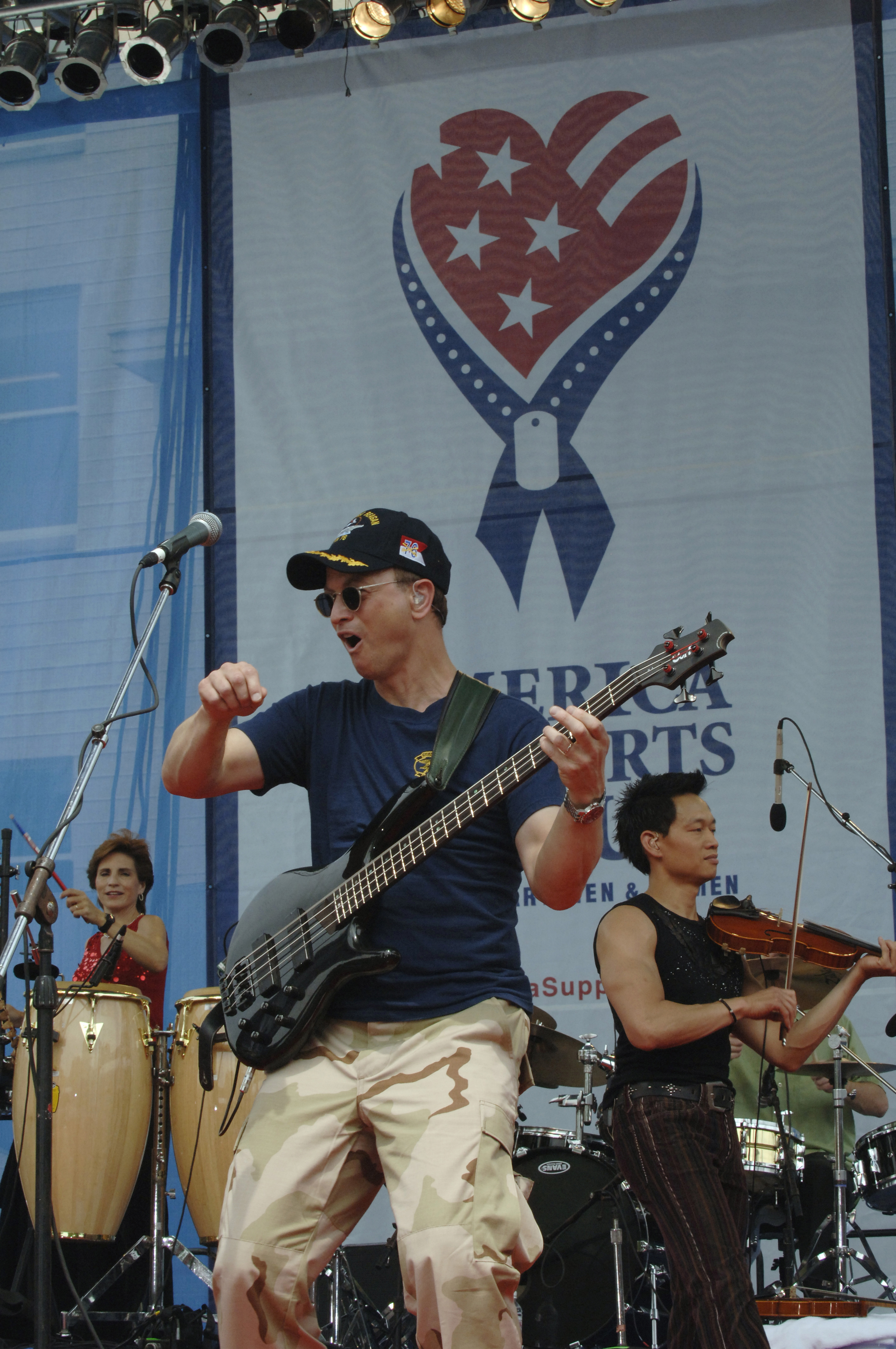
Performance in the courtyard of the Pentagon in support of the America Supports You program (May 5, 2006)

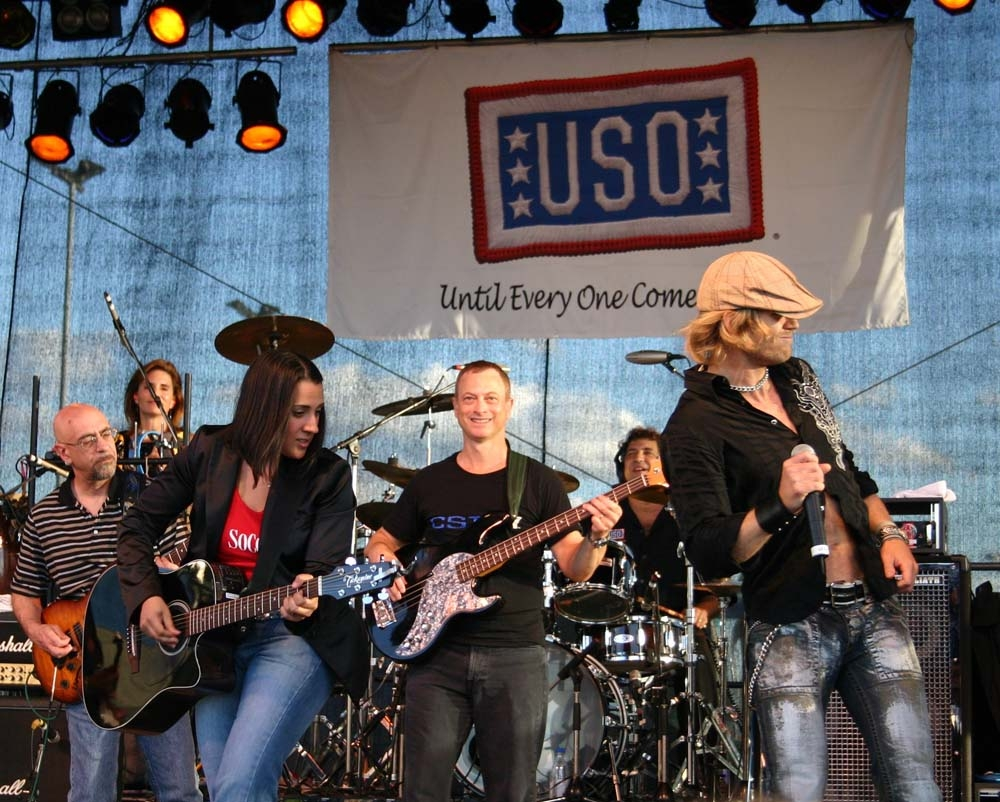
Gina Gonzalez, Gary Sinise, and Jeff Vezain (July 14, 2008)
