= House of Rademacher =

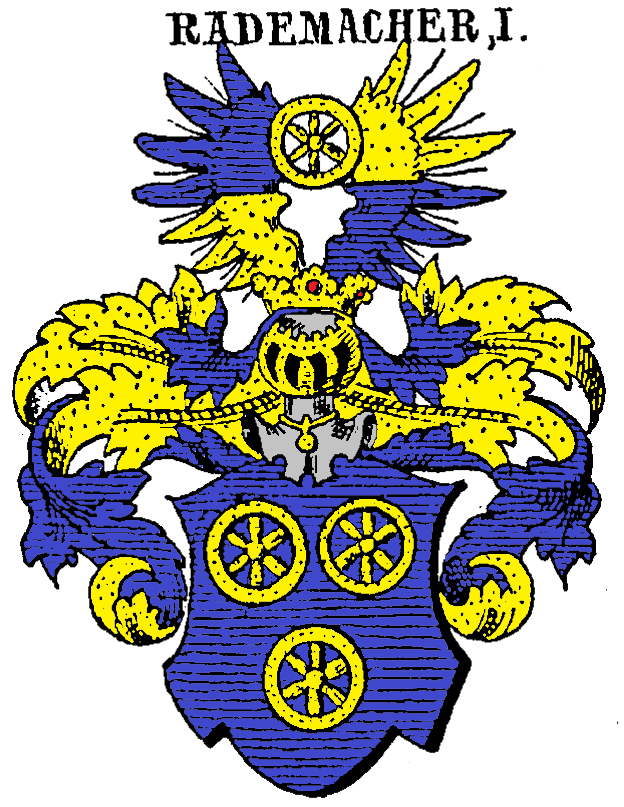
Coat of arms of the Rademacher family (variant I)

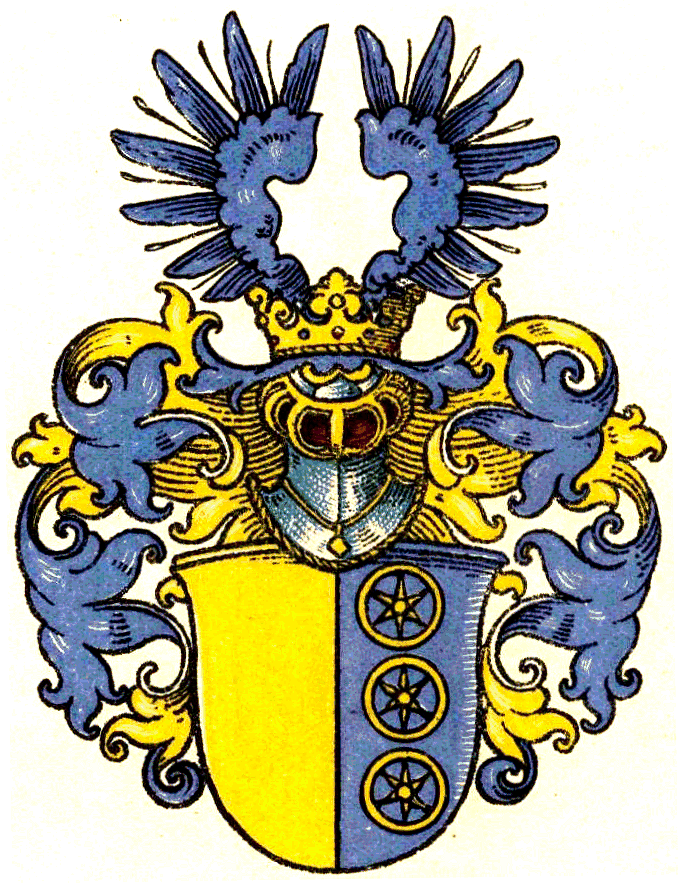
Coat of arms of the Rademacher family (variant II)

The Rademacher family is an extinct Westphalian noble family.

The family needs to be distinguished from the noble Rademacher von Radehausen family. Descendancy from the Rodemach family from the village of Rodemack in Lorraine has not been proven.

== History ==
The family's roots are in Soest where family members appear since the 15th century. On 13 July 1549 Charles V awarded a patent of nobility to the House of Rademacher.

Since the 16th century, the family was represented on the Soest City Council. Two of the sons of the Soest merchant and councilor Wilhelm Rademacher († 1673), who was married to Anna von Bruwerdinghausen, became mayors of Soest at the beginning of the 18th century. First, the youngest son, doctor Eberhard Rademacher (* 1648; † 1716), who was married to Gertrud Anna Bucksilber and whose only child, Luise Katharina Rademacher, married the mayor of Soest, Johann Arnold Schwachenberg. Later, the older brother Heinrich Rademacher (* 1643; † 1715) also married. His first marriage was to Anna Maria Witte, a sister of the mayor of Soest, Konrad Theodor Witte, and his second marriage was to a woman named Krakerügge. From these couples descended those family members who later found themselves in many Prussian military service. Part of the family stayed longer in Soest, another part was settled at Gut Broel near Welver-Borgeln.

Luise Antoinette von Rademacher was a canoness at St. Walburgis in Soest in 1778. Arnold Eberhard von Rademacher (* approx. 1728; † 1803) was a Royal Prussian War and Domain Councillor. He was married to Maria Luise von Roëll. She appears as a widow as late as 1790. The last documented family member in Soest was Maria Antonie Dorothea von Rademacher († 1836), since 1780 the wife of Heinrich Adam Regenherz, later mayor of Soest.

As late as 1857, Friedrich Karl Wilhelm von Rademacher, Duke of Saxon-Coburg-Gotha's chief steward and chamberlain, and Albert von Rademacher, chamberlain, appear.

== Notable members ==
- Arnold Eberhard von Rademacher († 1803), Royal Prussian War and Domain Council
- Eberhard Rademacher (1648–1716), Mayor of Soest 1703–1705, 1707–1709
- Heinrich Rademacher (1643–1715), Mayor of Soest 1705–1707, 1710–1712
