= Kelly Krauskopf =

American basketball executive (born 1961)

Indiana Fever
- Positions: President of basketball and business operations
- League: WNBA

Personal information
- Born: November 26, 1961 (age 64) Corpus Christi, Texas, U.S.

Career information
- College: Texas A&M University

Career history
- 1990–1996: NCAA SWC (Assistant commissioner)
- 1997–1999: WNBA (Director of operations)
- 2000–2017: Indiana Fever (General manager)
- 2017–2018: Pacers Gaming (Executive)
- 2018–2024: Indiana Pacers (Assistant general manager)
- 2025–2026: Indiana Fever (President)

Career highlights
- WNBA champion (2012); 3x Eastern Conference champion (2009, 2012, 2015)

Kelly Denise Krauskopf (born November 26, 1961) is an American basketball executive who previously served as the President of basketball and business operations for the Indiana Fever of the Women's National Basketball Association (WNBA). She is the former director of operations of Women's National Basketball Association (WNBA). Krauskopf is the former president and general manager of the Indiana Fever. She helped build the Indiana Fever franchise and led the team to WNBA playoffs thirteen times; the Fever took three conference titles and won the WNBA championship in 2012.

On December 17, 2018, the Indiana Pacers announced that she was hired as the Pacer's assistant general manager. She started in her new position in 2019.

In September, 2024 it was announced that she would be returning to the Indiana Fever as president of basketball and business operations.

On October 23, 2026, it was officially announced that she would be stepping down as president, but she made the decision prior to the end of the official 2026 season.

== Career ==
=== College basketball ===
Krauskopf played basketball collegiately during the 1980s. She played forward under coach Sue Gunter at Stephen F. Austin and became a three-year letterwinner under coach Cherri Rapp at Texas A&M where she was a senior team captain.

=== NCAA Southwest Conference ===
In 1990, Krauskopf joined the NCAA Southwest Conference (SWC) and served as assistant commissioner until 1996.

=== WNBA ===
In 1996, she became the WNBA's first director of operations upon the league's inception. She said that was a turning point in her career: "To be part of a historical startup pro league for women under the guidance and support of the NBA was an extraordinary opportunity."

=== Indiana Fever ===
Krauskopf joined Pacers Sports & Entertainment in 1999. She served as president and general manager of the Indiana Fever from 2000 to 2017; she was promoted to president in 2012. She led the Fever to eight consecutive playoff appearances and 13 appearances in total. During her tenure the team won three conference titles and a WNBA championship in 2012.

=== Pacers Gaming ===
In 2017, she left the Fever to oversee the Pacer's eSports team, Pacers Gaming, in NBA 2K League.

=== Indiana Pacers ===
On December 17, 2018, the Indiana Pacers announced that Krauskopf was hired as the Pacer's assistant general manager and she would leave her executive duties at the Fever and the Pacer's eSports team. She started in her new position on January 1, 2019. Krauskopf said her previous professional experiences have taught her "that building winning teams and elite level culture is not based on gender", and instead "it is based on people and processes". She would work with president of basketball operations Kevin Pritchard, general manager Chad Buchanan and assistant general manager Peter Dinwiddie.

When Krauskopf was hired, it was reported that she was the first female assistant general manager in National Basketball Association's history. Many pointed out that Nancy Leonard, the wife of Bobby Leonard, had held the same title during the 1970s. David Benner, Indiana Pacers director of media relations, said Leonard's role was "strictly on the business side of things" and Krauskopf is the first general manager in the contemporaneous meaning of "general manager". Pritchard said that Krauskopf would focus strictly on basketball and she would "not have any duties on the business side".

=== Return to Indiana Fever ===
In September 2024, Krauskopf returned to the Indiana Fever as president of basketball and business operations. After 2 seasons, she announce her decision to step down from the position in late October 2026.

=== Women's national team ===
Krauskopf had a significant role in selecting rosters for the three gold-winning United States women's national basketball teams that won in the 2004, 2008, and 2012 Summer Olympics.

== Personal life ==
Krauskopf was born and grew up in Corpus Christi, Texas. In 1983, she graduated from Texas A&M.
