= Mahbod Moghadam =

American internet entrepreneur

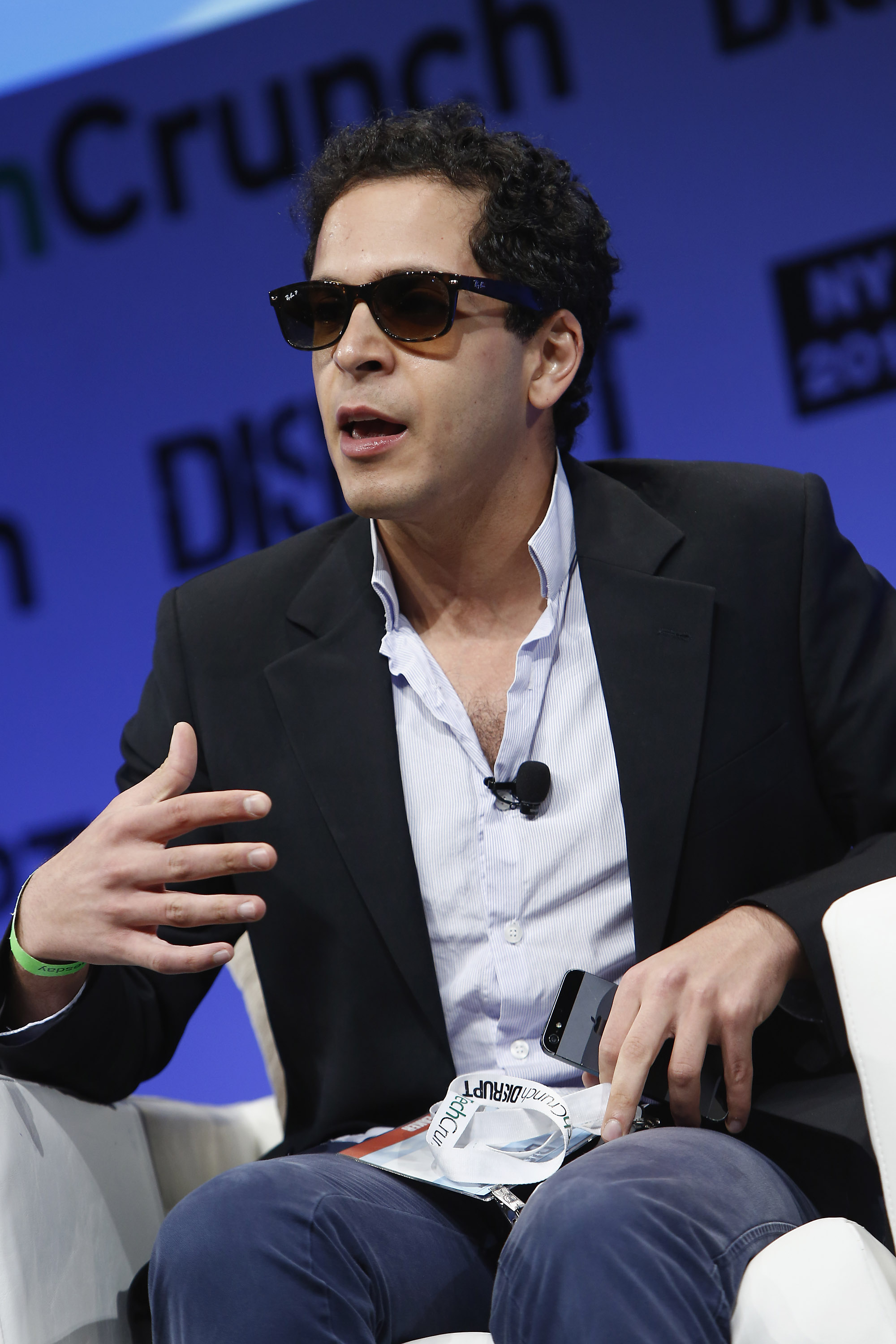
- Mahbod Moghadam at TechCrunch Disrupt New York 2013
- Born: November 17, 1982
- Died: March 25, 2024 (aged 41)
- Education: Yale University (BA); Stanford Law School (JD)
- Occupation: Internet entrepreneur
- Employer(s): Everipedia (2015–2019); Genius (2009–2014)
- Known for: Co-founder of Everipedia; Co-founder of Genius

Mahbod Moghadam (November 17, 1982 – March 25, 2024) was an American internet entrepreneur. In 2009, he, Tom Lehman and Ilan Zechory co-founded Rap Genius (now Genius), a website on which users can submit annotations and interpretations of song lyrics and other content. In 2015, he, Sam Kazemian and Theodor Forselius co-founded Everipedia, a wiki-based online encyclopedia, where he worked as the Chief Community Officer for several years. After leaving Everipedia, he became an entrepreneur-in-residence at the venture capital firm Mucker Capital, then worked on HellaDoge, a cryptocurrency-based social network.

== Early life and education ==
Moghadam was born to an Iranian Jewish family on November 17, 1982, and grew up in Encino, California. His family emigrated from Iran to the United States shortly before he was born.

He graduated from Yale University in 2004 with a major in History and International Studies. In 2005, he went to France on a Fulbright scholarship. When he returned in 2005, he enrolled at Stanford Law School, and graduated in 2008 with a J.D.

== Career ==
After graduating from law school in 2008, Moghadam became an attorney at the law firm of Dewey & LeBoeuf. In 2009, many law offices who were trying to endure the Great Recession placed junior employees on "deferral", paying them a partial salary to take time off and encouraging them to intern at other companies. While on deferral from Dewey & LeBoeuf, Moghadam was hired as an intern at Berkshire Hathaway in Omaha, Nebraska. However, shortly before departing for his internship, the internship offer was rescinded and he was fired by Dewey & LeBeouf when a Berkshire Hathaway employee discovered a satirical memo he had written and published on his blog, addressed to "Ballstate Insurance Company" (a reference to the Allstate insurance company, which was a client of Dewey & LeBoeuf).

=== Genius ===
In August 2009, Moghadam, Tom Lehman, and Ilan Zechory founded Rap Genius, a website that initially allowed users to annotate and interpret song lyrics. Moghadam inspired Lehman to build the site when he explained Cam'ron's lyric "80 holes in your shirt, there: your own Jamaican clothes" to Lehman.

Moghadam was included in the 2013 Forbes 30 Under 30 list along with the other Rap Genius cofounders. In 2014, Rap Genius rebranded to Genius and expanded to support annotations for news stories, poetry, and other documents. Moghadam resigned from Genius that same year after receiving negative media attention when he added annotations to the manifesto written by the perpetrator of the 2014 Isla Vista killings, describing it as "beautifully written". His comments were described by CNN as "tasteless and creepy"; later, Genius co-founder Lehman said in a statement that the annotations "not only didn't attempt to enhance anyone's understanding of the text, but [also] went beyond that into gleeful insensitivity and misogyny."

In 2021, Moghadam said he was angered by the "fire sale" of Genius to MediaLab that year, a deal which reportedly made Lehman and Zechory multi-millionaires but did not pay anything to him.

=== Other activities ===
After leaving Genius, Moghadam started an internet controversy by writing an article in Thought Catalog titled "How To Steal From Whole Foods". Thought Catalog later removed the article, along with the other articles Moghadam had published with the site.

In 2015, Moghadam met Sam Kazemian and joined him as co-founder and Chief Community Officer of Everipedia, a blockchain- and wiki-based online encyclopedia. He left Everipedia in 2019.

Moghadam began working at venture capital firm Mucker Capital in 2019. Moghadam later worked on HellaDoge, a social media platform based around the Dogecoin cryptocurrency.

== Personal life ==
Moghadam was known for his “outlandish” personality and behavior. In 2013 he received media attention for telling Mark Zuckerberg in an interview and Warren Buffett in a tweet to "suck [his] dick", and for his subsequent public apology to them during an onstage appearance at the TechCrunch Disrupt New York conference. He later attributed some of his behavior to a benign brain tumor that was discovered and removed in 2013.

In August 2018, Moghadam appeared as a guest on Sacha Baron Cohen's television series Who is America?, in which Cohen adopted various disguises and personas to capture his guests behaving in embarrassing ways. Believing he was doing a photoshoot with a "playboy photographer" named Gio, Moghadam is shown making the Bloods gang sign and imitating shooting a gun when Cohen asks him to "do something like a black guy." Later Cohen has him pose in front of a green screen so he could later be photoshopped into scenes as though he is feeding starving children.

In September 2018, Moghadam had an epileptic seizure attributable to a second brain tumor, and had brain surgery later that month.

In March 2024, Moghadam died at the age of 41 due to complications from his recurrent brain tumor.
