= Brent Chalem =

American actor

- Born: Brent Russell Chalem; February 7, 1975; Westlake Village, California, U.S.
- Died: December 9, 1997 (aged 22); Henderson, Nevada, U.S.
- Occupation: Actor
- Years active: 1985–1989

Brent Russell Chalem (February 7, 1975 – December 9, 1997) was an American child actor.

== Early life and education ==
Chalem was born in Westlake Village, California in February 7, 1975 to Allen and Bettyanne Chalem.

In 1980 and 1981, Chalem played in the American Youth Soccer Organization's Division VII (Pee Wee Division), first as a defender for the Yellow Jackets, and then as a goalkeeper for the Dragonflies. In 1982, Chalem progressed to the American Youth Soccer Organization's Division VI, playing for the Golden Eagles. In 1985, he played in the Senior Division of the Conejo Youth Flag Football Association as a defender for the Raiders. Chalem pursued various interests in 1986, including acting, baseball, baseball cards, being in the school choir and a flute player in the school band.

Chalem was an honour student at Westlake High School in 1993, was awarded a scholarship by the Westlake High School Scholarship Foundation, and later graduated from UC Berkeley with a degree in environmental science. In 1993, he was one of the organisers and presenters of the Condomania workshop during a HIV/AIDS conference "For Youth by Youth".

== Career ==
When Chalem was 7, he secretly applied to join an agency for child acting extras, looking to follow in the footsteps of his friends, despite his mother's initial opposition to such roles. He only told his parents about his application when the agency asked to interview him, and his parents acquiesced to support him. Chalem later applied to star in commercial advertisements, and his parents again supported, thinking that he would not be easily accepted. However, Chalem passed his first two career interviews to start his career. By the age of 10, Chalem had appeared in the movie Moving Violations, and on television in Small Wonder, Scarecrow and Mrs. King, Crazy Like a Fox, Happy, as well as five commercial advertisements, promoting McDonald's, hot dogs, frozen fish, computers, and bags.

Chalem's first featured movie acting role came in the comedic adventure film The Monster Squad, which was filmed in 1986 and released in 1987; Chalem endured four solo auditions before being selected to play Horace / Fat Kid, one of the children battling monsters such as Wolfman, Dracula, The Mummy and the Creature from the Black Lagoon. In the movie, Chalem's character was initially cowardly and mocked for being fat (the latter was part of a recurring pattern that occurred in 1980s horror movies), with his character being addicted to eating unhealthy food and nearly eating garlic bread which was a potential weapon against Dracula, but his character eventually has a heroic turn, inspiring many children who watched the movie and believed that they were similar to the character. Chalem learned how to use and shoot a shotgun during the filming of this movie, as his character used a shotgun to defeat the Creature from The Black Lagoon, helping two boys who had mocked him earlier. Chalem later became known for his character's "Wolfman's got nards" quote.

Chalem by 1987 had landed a recurring role in the television program Punky Brewster. He acted in Dance 'Til Dawn, a 1988 television film, and the television series Quantum Leap.

== Death ==
Chalem died on December 9, 1997, aged 22, due to pneumonia. Chalem died in Henderson, Nevada, where he had lived for a month. According to a friend of his family, Chalem was being treated with oxygen at his residence, but the oxygen supply malfunctioned, with Chalem later suffering respiratory arrest and entering a coma. Chalem's mother had also died at some point before him.

Before his death, Chalem was employed as a legal assistant at a law firm, in preparation for beginning law school in 1998. After his death, the Westlake High School Scholarship Foundation awarded a scholarship in tribute to Chalem, while the Wolfman's Got Nards documentary on the cult following of The Monster Squad paid tribute to Chalem.

== Filmography ==
=== Film ===
Year	Title	Role	Notes
1985	Moving Violations	Boy hit by car	
1987	The Monster Squad	Horace	
1988	Home Free	Little Dominic	
1988	Dance 'til Dawn	Tubby	

=== Television ===
Year	Title	Role	Notes
1985	Small Wonder	Willard	Episode: "The Bully"
1987	Punky Brewster	Spud Blugner	3 episodes
1988	Mr. Belvedere	Miller	Episode: "Pigskin"
1989	Quantum Leap	Bat Boy	2 episodes
