= Kazemian =

Kazemian is a surname. Notable people with the surname include:

- Javad Kazemian (born 1981), Iranian footballer
- Mohammad Amin Kazemian (born 1996), Iranian footballer
- Sam Kazemian (born 1993), Iranian-American software programmer and co-founder and president of Everipedia
