= Westlake High School (California) =

Public secondary school in Thousand Oaks, southern California, USA

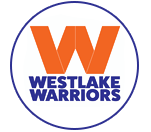

Location
- 100 Lakeview Canyon Road; Westlake Village (Note: Although the address lies within the city limits of Thousand Oaks, the school officially uses "Westlake Village" as its postal city, which can be verified using USPS address validation.), California 91362; United States; 34.159157°N 118.81731°W

Information
- Type: Public high school
- Established: 1978
- School district: Conejo Valley Unified School District
- NCES School ID: 060964001031
- Principal: Jason Branham
- Grades: 9–12
- Enrollment: 2,010 (2023–2024)
- Campus type: Suburban
- Colors: Blue; Orange; White
- Athletics conference: CIF Southern Section; Marmonte League
- Team name: Warriors
- Website: whs.conejousd.org

Westlake High School (WHS) is a public high school in the Westlake neighborhood of Thousand Oaks, in Ventura County, California. It serves grades 9–12 and is part of the Conejo Valley Unified School District.

The first graduating class was the class of 1980. The first principal was William Albers. All students entering Westlake High School in 1979 signed a charter, which sits in the office today. Ron Lipari was the principal of WHS for 15 years. In 2015, Jason Branham was selected as the new principal.

== Academics ==
Newsweek has consistently ranked WHS as one of the top high schools in the United States. In 2015, Westlake's average score on Advanced Placement exams was 3.65. In 2016, Westlake ranked as the 119th top high school in the United States and the 15th-best high school in the state of California.

It is one of four high schools in the Conejo Valley Unified School District, that consistently has significantly above-average AP and SAT scores, and 96% of graduating seniors go on to attend some type of college or further education.

=== Advanced anatomy (1990-2021) ===
Westlake High offered a course called Advanced Anatomy. In the course, students worked with human cadavers. Nancy Bowman, a physiology teacher, started the program in 1990. As of 1994, the school was the only school in the United States to have a second-year program in advanced anatomy. Jordan Michaels, co-founder of Ringadoc, participated in the program. In 2015, Dr. Ira Byock spoke to the honors class about Death With Dignity laws. Following Bowman's retirement in 2021, the course was discontinued, and is currently not offered.

== Athletics ==
Westlake High School offers a wide variety of sports and activities, including football, basketball, cross-country, tennis, volleyball, cheerleading, water polo, soccer, wrestling, lacrosse, softball, swimming, and track and field. Many Westlake athletic teams compete in the Marmonte League of the CIF Southern Section, and are known as the Warriors.

=== Aquatics program ===
In 2001, WHS opened an aquatics complex on its campus. WHS grad Veronika Weiss, who played on the girls' water polo team, was killed in the Isla Vista shooting. In 2015, the school retired her number 11.

=== Baseball ===
In 2018 the team was coached by Zack Thornton.

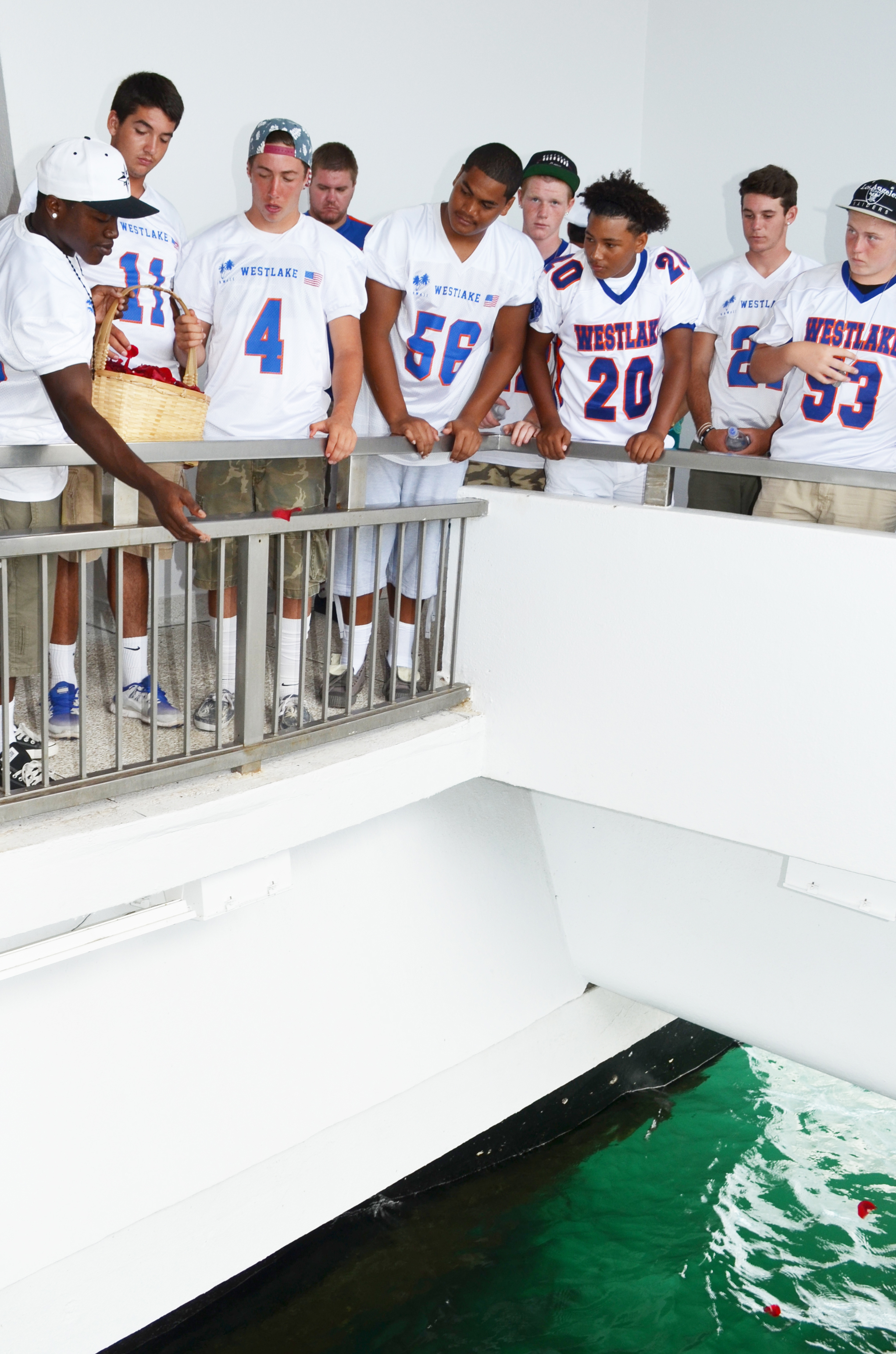
California's Westlake High School football players drop flower petals in the water in honor of Lt. j.g. Francis L. Toner IV and Spc. A.J. Castro during a memorial held at the USS Arizona Memorial. Toner and Castro, graduates of Westlake, died during Operation Enduring Freedom

=== Golf ===
Westlake has had successful golf teams. In 2002, Senior Brian Van Heel won the CIF/CGA California State High School Championship. In 2014, the Westlake High School boys golf team won the CIF/CGA California State High School Championship. In 2015, the boys golf team again won the CIF/ CGA State Championship, becoming the first school to ever win back-to-back state titles in California.

=== Soccer ===
Patrick Otte was a head soccer coach from 2019 to 2020.

== The arts ==
In 2010, Westlake High School's theatre, built in the 1970s, was expanded and renovated, and its name was changed to The Carpenter Family Theatre. It is named after The Carpenters, who initially approached the school about expanding and renovating the theatre, and donated an initial contribution to jumpstart construction.

== Filming site ==
- Blink 182's music video for "Josie" (1998) was filmed at Westlake High School, using official Westlake High School uniforms.Video on YouTube
- The 1994 movie A Friend to Die For was filmed at Westlake High School, using official Westlake High School cheer uniforms with the logo removed.
- The 2006 movie Gridiron Gang was filmed at Westlake High School.
- Halsey's music video for "Colors" (2016) was filmed at Westlake High School, using the football field, classroom, and quad.

== Notable alumni ==
- Andre Baccellia NFL football player
- Deidre Behar, entertainment reporter
- Danny Barrera, professional soccer player
- Aaron Bruno, singer for AWOLNATION
- Rudy Carpenter, NFL football player
- Andrew Castro, United States Army Intelligence Specialist killed in Afghanistan
- Brent Chalem, child actor
- Jonni Cheatwood, artist
- Luke Christopher, singer, rapper
- Jason Cook, actor
- Kamren Fabiculanan, college football safety for the Washington Huskies
- Matt Franco, retired Major League Baseball first baseman
- Helane Freeman, art director and artist
- Jeremiah Gray, basketball player
- Katherine Ho, former contestant on the Voice and featured vocalist in Crazy Rich Asians soundtrack.
- Kevin Howard, former professional baseball player
- Jesser, basketball YouTuber
- Nicole Johnson, model and beauty queen, Miss California USA 2010
- Cobi Jones, retired professional soccer player; National Soccer Hall of Fame
- Danielle Kang, golfer, winner of 2017 Women's PGA Championship
- David Kaye, United Nations special rapporteur and clinical professor of law at University of California, Irvine
- Sam Kazemian, Founder of Frax Finance & formerly president & co-founder of Everipedia
- P.J. Lane, actor
- Tomasi Laulile, professional football player
- Mike Lieberthal (born 1972), retired Major League Baseball 2x All Star catcher
- Adam Mazarei, assistant basketball coach at Vanderbilt; former Memphis Grizzlies assistant coach
- Jordan Michaels, healthcare entrepreneur
- Patrick Mekari, NFL football player
- Billy Miller, NFL football player
- Trevor Moore, NHL hockey player
- Josh Moser, sportscaster and journalist
- Tahj Mowry, actor and former Westlake football running back
- Kristin Neff, pioneering researcher of self-compassion and best-selling author
- Greg Newman, football player
- Mike Nickeas, Major League Baseball catcher
- Ja'seem Reed, NFL wide receiver for the Carolina Panthers
- Catherine Ricafort, Broadway actress and singer
- Nick Rutherford, member of sketch group Good Neighbor and a Saturday Night Live writer
- Mike Seidman (born 1981), NFL football player
- Hannah Sharts, professional soccer player
- Nelson Spruce, professional football player
- Connor Storrie, actor
- Dylan Volantis, college baseball pitcher for the Texas Longhorns
- Craig Walendy, NFL football player
- Gary Wellman, retired NFL football player
- Charlie Wi (born 1972), professional golfer
- Eric Wynalda, retired professional soccer player; National Soccer Hall of Fame
- Matthew Wolff, professional golfer
- Christian Yelich (born 1991), Major League Baseball player, 2018 National League MVP, 2026 World Series Champion - Milwaukee Brewers
