= Pacers Gaming =

American esports team

- Sport: NBA 2K
- Founded: 2017
- Colors: Navy blue, gold, cool gray
- Affiliation: Indiana Pacers
- Partners: Indiana National Guard
- Parent group: Pacers Sports & Entertainment
- Website: pacersgaming.nba.com

Pacers Gaming is an esports team that competed in the NBA 2K League (NBA 2KL or 2KL) from 2018 to 2024. They are a venture of Pacers Sports & Entertainment (PS&E), which owns the Indiana Pacers of the National Basketball Association (NBA), as well as the Women's National Basketball Association (WNBA)'s Indiana Fever, and the Indiana Mad Ants of the NBA G League.

== History ==
In February 2017, the National Basketball Association (NBA) and the developer of the NBA 2K video game series, Take-Two Interactive, announced plans to launch an esports league around NBA 2K. In May, the Indiana Pacers were announced as among the 17 of NBA's 30 teams set to participate in the inaugural NBA 2K League season, scheduled for 2018. Pacers Gaming was established in December as part of the Pacers Sports & Entertainment (PS&E) umbrella. The team's founding was led by Kelly Krauskopf, at the time the team president of the Indiana Fever of the Women's National Basketball Association (WNBA), as well as the Senior Vice President of the Indiana Pacers. The team competes in the NBA 2K League, a joint venture between the NBA and Take-Two Interactive, the publisher of the NBA 2K' video game franchise. The Pacers were one of the first teams to join the 2K League. Cody Parrent serves as the team's Senior Director of eSports Operations, equivalent to the head coach and general manager of the team. The team is sponsored by the Indiana National Guard.

In the first 2K League Draft, Pacers Gaming selected Bryan "WoLF 74" Colon, a 22-year old from New York, with the 13th overall pick. During the 2018 season, WoLF 74 was selected All-Tournament Second Team in the league's Tip-Off Tournament.

The team won five games in its first season; in the following season, they doubled their win total and finished with a 10–6 record. They clinched a playoff berth and the sixth seed in the playoffs. They lost in the first round of the playoffs to 76ers Gaming Club, 0–2 in a best-of-three series.

In 2020, the 2KL expanded and re-aligned its teams into newly formed Eastern and Western Conferences. That season, Pacers Gaming failed to qualify for the playoffs, finishing the season in 9th place in the 11-team Western Conference with a 4–12 record. The team had a resurgent 2021 season, finishing in second place in their conference, with a 20–8 record. They lost in the second round of the playoffs to Jazz Gaming.

Beginning in 2022, the NBA 2KL added a 3v3 format, which would be played over the course of three tournaments as opposed to a traditional regular season. That season, the league returned to in-person competition, after two years of remote play due to the COVID-19 pandemic. In the 2KL's 3v3 format in 2022, Pacers Gaming had a league-best 17–6 record, earning the number-one seed and a first-round bye for postseason play. They lost in their first championship tournament matchup to Rim Runners, an amateur team, 0–3.

Pacers Gaming finished the 3v3 portion of their 2024 season with an 8–7 and 31–29 record in series played and overall games played, respectively. In 5v5 play, they finished the year going 8–9 and lost to Bucks Gaming in the first round of the playoffs, 0–2. In July, after the 2KL season concluded, 2KL CEO Andrew Perlmutter held a town hall with the league's staff and management, firing everyone and placing Pacers Gaming, along with the rest of the entire league, on an 18-month hiatus intended to be spent revamping the league.

== Logos and branding ==
A sister team of the NBA's Indiana Pacers, the Pacers Gaming logo features a stylized version of Boomer, the Pacers' mascot. In the press release announcing Pacers Gaming, the logo was called a "modernized Pacers Panther". Like the NBA team, Pacers Gaming's logo is blue and yellow.

== Season-by-season results ==
=== 5v5 format ===
Season	Finish (Note: The Finish column lists regular season results and excludes postseason play.)	W (Note: The Wins and Losses columns list regular season results and exclude any postseason play, or play in the "Tip-Off", "The Turn", or "The Ticket" tournaments. Regular and postseason records are combined only below the table.)	L	Win%	Playoffs	Head Coach
2018		5	9	.357	Did not qualify	Cody Parrent
2019	6th	10	6	.625	Lost first round (76ers Gaming Club); 0–2	Cody Parrent
2020		4	12	.250	Did not qualify	Cody Parrent
2021	2nd	20	8	.714	Lost second round (Jazz Gaming)	
2022		6	11	.353		
2023		11	13	.458		
2024		8	9	.471	Lost first round (Bucks Gaming); 0–2	

=== 3v3 format ===
Season	Finish	W	L	Win%	Playoffs	Head Coach
2022	1st	17	6	.739	Lost 3v3 Championship Tournament (Rim Runners); 3–0	
2023		14	12	.538	N/A	
2024		31	29	.517		
