= Jazz Gaming =

American esports team

- Sport: NBA 2K
- Founded: 2017
- Based in: Salt Lake City, Utah
- Colors: Navy, white, yellow
- Affiliation: Utah Jazz
- Website: jazzgaming.nba.com

Jazz Gaming is an esports team that competed in the NBA 2K League (NBA 2KL or 2KL) from 2018 to 2024. Founded in 2017, they are associated with the Utah Jazz of the National Basketball Association (NBA).

== History ==
Jazz Gaming was one of the original 17 NBA 2KL teams to be announced. In December 2017, the Utah Jazz announced the name and logo for Jazz Gaming. The team's logos were created by RARE Design; its primary logo is "a 3D shape of Utah, with a white U and gold J outlined in navy blue". They also designed a secondary logo, featuring the team name with a pair of eighth notes in the "A" slot in "Jazz".

In the inaugural 2KL draft, held in 2018, Jazz Gaming selected Shaka "Yeah I Compete" Browne with the third-overall pick. Their five following picks in the draft were: Malik "MrSlaughter01" Leisinger, DeMar "Deedz" Butler, Delano "Tifeworld" Allsup Jr., Jaishon "24k JSmoove" Scott, and Michael "Stambreezy" Stam. The 2KL held the Tip-Off Tournament to begin the 2018 season; Deedz was named to the All-Tournament Third Team. The team finished with a 5−9 record, dropping their final seven games after starting the season 5−2.

Jazz Gaming held the first-overall pick in the 2019 2KL draft, which they used to select Spencer "Ria" Wyman. Jazz Gaming finished the season with an 8–8 record and missed the playoffs.

In the 2020 2KL draft, Jazz Gaming selected Brentathan "Lord Beezus" Aasgaard; Lord Beezus previously played for Pacers Gaming. During the season, Jazz Gaming played their games remotely from Level 5 of Vivint Smart Home Arena. The team lost in the semifinals of the Tip-Off Tournament. The team finished the regular season with a 14–2 record, clinching its first playoff berth and the 2nd seed in the playoffs. In his second year with the team, head coach Jelani "Comp" Mitchell was also named 2KL Coach of the Year. They lost in the semifinal round of the playoffs.

Jazz Gaming selected Kimanni "Splashy" Ingram with the first pick in the 2021 2KL draft. In 2021, Splashy and Ria were voted as All-Stars for the inaugural 2KL All-Star Game. The team finished with an 18–10 record, placing them third in the 2KL's Western Conference. After defeating Warriors Gaming Squad 2–1 in a best-of-three series, Jazz Gaming advanced to the 2KL Finals in 2021, which they lost to Wizards District Gaming 0–3 in a best-of-five series.

In October 2022, Splashy was among six 2KL players to be indefinitely disqualified from any league activity. An investigation by the league found the six players to have wagered or attempted to wager on 2KL games, either themselves or through other individuals.

In July 2024, 2KL CEO Andrew Perlmutter held a town hall with the league's staff and management, firing everyone and placing Jazz Gaming, along with the rest of the entire league, on an 18-month hiatus intended to be spent revamping the league.

== Season-by-season results ==
=== 5v5 format ===
Season	Finish (Note: The Finish column lists regular season results and excludes postseason play.)	W (Note: The Wins and Losses columns list regular season results and exclude any postseason play, or play in the "Tip-Off", "The Turn", or "The Ticket" tournaments. Regular and postseason records are combined only below the table.)	L	Win%	Playoffs	Head Coach
2018		5	9		Did not qualify	
2019		8	8	.500	Did not qualify	Jelani Mitchell
2020	2nd	14	2	.875	Lost semifinal round	Jelani Mitchell
2021	3rd	18	10	.643	Lost 2KL Finals (Wizards District Gaming); 0–3	Jelani Mitchell
2022						Jelani Mitchell
2023						
2024						
