= The Monster Squad =

1987 film directed by Fred Dekker

- Theatrical release poster
- Directed by: Fred Dekker
- Written by: Shane Black; Fred Dekker
- Produced by: Jonathan A. Zimbert
- Starring: Andre Gower; Robby Kiger; Duncan Regehr; Stephen Macht; Stan Shaw; Tom Noonan
- Cinematography: Bradford May
- Edited by: James Mitchell
- Music by: Bruce Broughton
- Color process: Metrocolor
- Production companies: Taft Entertainment Pictures; Keith Barish Productions; Home Box Office
- Distributed by: Tri-Star Pictures
- Release date: August 14, 1987
- Running time: 82 minutes
- Country: United States
- Language: English
- Budget: $14 million
- Box office: $3.8 million

The Monster Squad is a 1987 American horror comedy film directed by Fred Dekker, and written by Dekker and Shane Black. Peter Hyams and Rob Cohen served as executive producers. It was released by Tri-Star Pictures on August 14, 1987. The film features pastiches of the Universal Monsters, led by Count Dracula. They are confronted by a group of savvy children out to keep them from controlling the world.

The film was produced on a budget of $14 million. It was released on August 14, 1987, it grossed $3.8 million in its theatrical run, and has since garnered a cult following.

== Plot ==
The Monster Squad is a club of pre-teens who idolize the Universal classic monster movies and their non-human stars. Club leader Sean Crenshaw, whose younger sister Phoebe desperately wants to join the club, is given the diary of legendary monster hunter Dr. Abraham Van Helsing, but his excitement abates when he finds it is written in German. Sean and the rest of the Monster Squad – his best friend, Patrick Rhodes, clumsy Horace (nicknamed "Fat Kid"), tough older kid Rudy, and little Eugene – visit an elderly man known as the "Scary German Guy", actually a kind gentleman and a former concentration camp prisoner, to translate the diary.

The diary describes an amulet composed of concentrated goodness. Once every century, as the forces of good and evil reach a balance, the otherwise-indestructible amulet becomes vulnerable. With the next day of balance happening within a few days at the stroke of midnight, the children realize they must gain possession of the amulet and use it – with an incantation from Van Helsing's diary – to open a wormhole in the universe and cast the monsters into Limbo. As shown in the film's prelude, Van Helsing had unsuccessfully attempted this one hundred years ago to defeat his old adversary Count Dracula; his apprentices then immigrated to the US to hide the amulet out of Dracula's reach.

Nevertheless, Dracula seeks to obtain the amulet so that he can take over the world. To this end, he assembles several monstrous allies: The Mummy, the Gill-man, The Wolf Man, and three school girls whom the Count transforms into his vampiric consorts. Dracula then steals a crate containing Frankenstein's monster from a B-25 Mitchell in flight, thus completing his army. However, Frankenstein's monster is reluctant to aid Dracula and wanders into the forest, where he encounters Phoebe. She shows him the kindness he has always sought, and they become friends. After the Monster Squad acknowledges that Frankenstein's monster is not evil, he chooses to help the boys instead of Dracula.

The amulet is buried in a stone room beneath a house that Dracula and the other monsters now occupy, littered with wards that prevent the monsters from taking it. The Monster Squad breaks into the house, acquires the amulet, and narrowly escapes Dracula's grasp. They confer with Scary German Guy, who informs them that a female virgin must read the incantation. In revenge for their meddling, Dracula destroys the Squad's clubhouse, thereby drawing Police Detective Del Crenshaw, Sean and Phoebe's father, into the fray. Dracula then destroys Detective Crenshaw's squad car with dynamite, killing his partner Rich inside the car.

As midnight approaches, the Squad makes its way to a local cathedral to make its last stand. The doors are locked, so the incantation must be read on the stoop, leaving the Squad vulnerable. They enlist Patrick's elder sister Lisa to help them, as she is the only virgin they know, but the incantation fails since Lisa is actually not a virgin anymore. As the monsters close in, the Squad deduces that Phoebe must complete the task of opening the portal, and Scary German Guy attempts to help her read the incantation while the Squad and Detective Crenshaw fend off the monsters.

In the ensuing battle, Dracula's consorts, the Mummy, the Gill-man, and the Wolfman are defeated. Dracula arrives to destroy the amulet when Frankenstein's monster intervenes, impaling him on a wrought-iron cross. Phoebe finishes the incantation, opening the portal, which begins to consume the bodies of the monsters. Dracula, still alive, attempts to drag Sean in with him, but Sean impales Dracula with a wooden stake, and Patrick grabs Sean before he gets pulled in with Dracula. Having briefly escaped from Limbo, Van Helsing appears and pulls Dracula to his doom. As Frankenstein's monster is drawn into the portal, Phoebe holds onto him and pleads for him to stay. Knowing he does not belong on Earth, Frankenstein's monster lets go of Phoebe's hand, but accepts her gift of a stuffed animal to remember her by. The portal then closes, ensuring the world's safety.

The United States Army arrives on the scene, having received a letter from Eugene earlier asking for their help against the monsters. When the confused general fails to make sense of the situation, Sean steps forward and presents the man with his business card, identifying himself and his friends as "The Monster Squad".

== Cast ==
- Andre Gower as Sean Crenshaw
- Robby Kiger as Patrick Rhodes
- Stephen Macht as Detective Del Crenshaw
- Duncan Regehr as Count Dracula
- Tom Noonan as Frankenstein's monster
- Brent Chalem as Horace "Fat Kid"
- Ryan Lambert as Rudolph "Rudy" Holloran
- Ashley Bank as Phoebe Crenshaw
- Michael Faustino as Eugene
- Jonathan Gries as Desperate Man / The Wolf Man
- Mary Ellen Trainor as Emily Crenshaw
- Leonardo Cimino as Scary German Guy
- Stan Shaw as Detective Rich Sapir
- Lisa Fuller as Lisa Rhodes
- Carl Thibault as The Wolf Man
- Tom Woodruff Jr. as Gill-man
- Michael Reid MacKay as Mummy
- Jack Gwillim as Abraham Van Helsing
- Adam Carl as Derek
- Jason Hervey as E.J.
- David Proval as Pilot
- Daryl Anderson as Co-Pilot
- Mary Albee as Vampire Bride #1
- Brynn Baron as Vampire Bride #2
- Julie Merrill as Vampire Bride #3
- Charly Morgan as Vampire Bride #4 (with possum)

== Production ==
=== Development and writing ===
The film had a relatively quick development, being first discussed in 1985 and shot the following year. Fred Dekker was toying with the idea of rebooting some classic series, such as The Little Rascals and the Universal Monsters. Upon watching Abbott and Costello Meet Frankenstein, he thought about doing a crossover of the two. While Dekker was putting the finishing touches to his debut Night of the Creeps, he offered Shane Black, his friend and roommate at a West L.A. filmmakers residence nicknamed the "Pad O'Guys", to turn that pitch into a screenplay. Black's first draft, which included several epic scenes that would have sent the picture overbudget, clocked in at 150 to 160 pages, depending on recollections. It was trimmed down in two passes by Dekker, to about 100 pages. The story was originally set in Baton Rouge, Louisiana, although the city was not mentioned in the finished film.

As it drew inspiration from their catalogue, the project was first offered to Universal Pictures, but one executive proved particularly dismissive and they passed on it. However, they later accepted to handle international distribution. Dekker asked one of his favorite directors, Peter Hyams, for guidance. The veteran helmer sent the script to Taft/Barish, who quickly expressed interest, and he agreed to serve as executive producer to help the film move forward. Hyams ended up having a sizeable influence on the venture, and his lean filmmaking approach sometimes conflicted with that of the less methodical Dekker, with the latter calling him "a very stern taskmaster". Hyams also brought in important crew members, such as editor James Mitchell, production designer Albert Brenner and cinematographer Bradford May, all former collaborators of his. On the other hand, composer Bruce Broughton was Dekker's choice, and Hyams would retain his services for his next three directorial efforts, starting with 1988's The Presidio.

=== Casting and creature design ===
Duncan Regehr narrowly beat a then little known Liam Neeson for the role of Dracula. Neeson was still supposed to appear as a human disguise conjured by Dracula to conceal his identity, but that scene was not shot. Following his breakthrough performance as a serial killer in Manhunter, Tom Noonan became sought after for similar, unsettling roles. He chose this film over Near Dark as his next project due to its more lighthearted nature, but Kathryn Bigelow was persistent and showed up on set to work out an early release with the producers in hope that he could do both. She was turned down.

The special effects were contributed by a Stan Winston Studio team headed by Tom Woodruff Jr., who worked from Winston's concept arts. The characters were given subtle modifications, as their most famous designs—or in the case of the Creature from the Black Lagoon, the creature itself—were Universal intellectual properties. Woodruff was assigned to work on Frankenstein's monster, Shane Mahan was given the Mummy, John Rosengrant got the Wolfman, and Alec Gillis took care of Dracula's bat transformation. However, it's the Gillman suit, made by Matt Rose and studio newcomer Steve Wang, that came to be viewed as a milestone in the development of creature costumes. Based on their Monster Squad work, Rose and Wang were entrusted with building a similar suit on short notice for Predator, which helped the struggling production move forward.

=== Filming and post-production ===
Principal photography kicked off on October 13, 1986. Exteriors were shot at Warner Bros. Studios and the Warner/Columbia Ranch in Burbank, California, Universal Studios in Universal City, and on location throughout the Los Angeles metropolitan area. Many interiors were shot at Culver Studios in Culver City. Due to most of the film taking place at night and regulations regarding how late young actors could work, the children filmed their scenes first for about three hours in the early evening, while the rest of the crew remained on set for much of the night. Filming went a week over schedule, and lasted 50 days. About 10 nights were devoted to the finale.

There were tensions between Hyams, a proponent of traditional filming methods based on master shots, and the self-taught Dekker. Hyams even considered firing Dekker at the end of the first week of shooting, but producer Rob Cohen helped smooth out their differences, and the young man agreed to conform to industry standard practices after that. Hyams also directed some second unit material for the film, including the werewolf's phone booth scene. Night of the Creeps employed a 1.85:1 aspect ratio, but Hyams chose to shoot this one in 2.39:1.

While the majority of the effects were done in camera, including the bat transformation and some background lightning, the film still included a number of visual effects, such as the vortex. They were supervised by Richard Edlund and Boss Films of Ghostbusters fame. The film was cut by 13 minutes by the producers, who did not want it to run more than 90 minutes. According to Dekker, the film's brevity was largely due to Hyams, who felt that trimming subplots like Sean's parents' marital issues would make the film more tonally consistent, although he disagreed with that assessment. Post-release budget estimates varied between $12.5 and 14 million.

== Release ==
The Monster Squad was marketed through a series of posters designed to look like "Wanted" police placards, although the model used for Dracula was not Duncan Regehr. The main poster featured the Ghostbusters-inspired slogan "You know who to call when you have ghosts. But who do you call when you have monsters?". The film held its premiere party at the Hard Rock Café in Hollywood, California. Kiefer Sutherland, the star of The Lost Boys, was among those who showed up to support the film.

=== Box office ===
The film opened in the U.S. on August 14, 1987, generating $2.9 million in revenue in its first week, good only for 12th place. By its second weekend, the film was averaging a dismal $696 per screen and was pulled from theaters with a poor domestic tally of $3,769,990. Opening-weekend audiences polled by CinemaScore gave the film an average grade of "B+" on an A+ to F scale.

Dekker wished that a company with better affinity for marketing feel good movies, such as Disney's Touchstone Pictures, had picked up the film. The Monster Squad's PG-13 rating may have prevented it from reaching the audience most likely to identify with its characters, while older teenagers were more interested in the R-rated The Lost Boys, which opened just two weeks prior. Some thought that the film's slogan made it look like a B-movie knockoff, and the film suffered from further comparisons with The Goonies, although Dekker says he had not seen it at that point.

=== Critical response ===
On Rotten Tomatoes, the film holds an approval rating of 53% based on 30 reviews, with an average rating of 6.1/10. The website's critical consensus reads, "A fun 80's adventure with a slightly scary twist, The Monster Squad offers tween-friendly horror with just enough of a kick." Metacritic assigned the film a weighted average score of 61 out of 100 based on 14 critics, indicating "generally favorable reviews".

Of contemporary reviews, Kevin Thomas of the Los Angeles Times wrote that it is "fun for the kid in all of us". British magazine Starburst wrote that "[t]reading almost the same route as The Lost Boys, The Monster Squad succeeds where that film failed because Dekker knows his stuff and doesn't see trendy video technique as a replacement for mood and style." However, it predicted that its 15 BBFC certificate would likely prevent it from reaching its intended audience in the country. Vincent Canby of The New York Times called it "a feature-length commercial for a joke store that sells not-great, rubber monster masks". Dave Kehr of the Chicago Tribune found the film's juxtaposition of child heroes and intense visuals to be distasteful, writing "[p]art E.T. and part Abbott and Costello Meet Frankenstein, Fred Dekker`s The Monster Squad is crass but imponderable, bizarrely mixing glowingly back-lit sentimentality with stomach-churning violence and juvenile sex jokes. Its target audience appears to be practiced sadists in the 12- to 14-year-old age group".

Of retrospective reviews, Francis Rizzo III of DVDTalk wrote that "there's much more than nostalgia going for it, as the story of a band of horror film fans battling the classic movie monsters is a fun piece of filmmaking [...] and an exciting action flick." Nathan Rabin of The A.V. Club stated that "Squad's gleeful monster mash anticipates bloated CGI orgies like Van Helsing, which likely cost a hundred times as much, yet boasts a hundredth of Squad's scrappy, ramshackle charm." Keith Phipps of The Verge deemed it "a devoted homage to the films [Dekker] grew up loving", playing "like highly polished fan fiction from a creator who clearly never let his Famous Monsters of Filmland subscription lapse." Jason Clark of Entertainment Weekly was more measured, calling it "the ultimate '80s movie", albeit "far from perfect".

=== Accolades ===
The Monster Squad won a Silver Raven (special jury prize) at the 1988 Brussels International Fantastic Film Festival. In its July 2006 list of "The 100 Greatest Villains Ever", Wizard placed Dracula at number 30 and chose Regehr's portrayal from The Monster Squad as the definitive version of the character.

== Post-release ==
=== Home video ===
The Monster Squad was first issued by Vestron Video on February 10, 1988, on VHS and Betamax, with the LaserDisc released shortly after by Image Entertainment. It was the film's only domestic release for nearly two decades.

Following the 2006 reunion (see Theatrical revival section below), a fan campaign led to a 20th Anniversary Edition two-disc DVD being released by Lionsgate on July 24, 2007. It contains a variety of bonus features, including a five-part retrospective documentary titled Monster Squad Forever, two audio commentaries, deleted scenes, trailers, TV spots, and animated storyboards. It won the 2008 Saturn Award for Best Classic Film DVD Release.

Lionsgate issued a region-free Blu-ray on November 24, 2009, containing the same extras as the DVD. This edition is now out of print. The Monster Squad became available for streaming on Hulu on September 1, 2017, and on July 1, 2018, on Amazon Prime Video. In November 2023, The Monster Squad was released on UHD Blu-ray by Kino Lorber. The three-disc set features a 4K print of the film, as well as 2K versions of it and the retrospective documentary Wolfman's Got Nards, along with archive special features.

=== Theatrical revival ===
On April 16, 2006, Ain't It Cool News writer Eric Vespe organized two screenings of The Monster Squad at the Alamo Drafthouse Cinema in Austin, Texas. The event, which was attended by Dekker, Gower, Banks and Lambert, was a sellout and marked a turning point in the film's revival. It led to many more screenings and a letter-writing campaign for the film's home video re-release.

For its 30th anniversary, Gower and Lambert took the film on a tour of 17 American cities in association with Alamo Drafthouse Cinemas, bookended by an additional screening at London's Prince Charles Cinema.

== Legacy ==
On the heels of The Monster Squad, Dekker re-upped with Taft/Barrish for his dream project, a feature adaptation of the 1960s TV series Jonny Quest, but the box office failure of the former put the film in limbo. Actor Brent Chalem did not get to witness the film's popular resurgence, having met an untimely death from pneumonia in 1997, at the age of 22.

Gower went on to direct and co-produce Wolfman's Got Nards, a feature-length account of The Monster Squad's cult status. Primarily shot during the original film's 30th anniversary revival tour, the documentary was previewed in abridged form at various horror film events, before premiering on April 7, 2018, at the Chattanooga Film Festival. It was also part of the official selection for the 2018 Sitges International Fantastic Film Festival. It received extremely positive reviews, although they primarily emanated from genre film outlets rather than mainstream media. In October 2019, the film embarked on a tour of 20 Alamo Drafthouse locations.

=== Cancelled remake ===
In 2008, producer Rob Cohen said that the film rights were back with Paramount and there were plans to remake the film; however, he had no desire to direct. In 2010, it was announced that Michael Bay's Platinum Dunes had officially signed on to produce, with Cohen to direct and Mark and Brian Gunn writing the screenplay. However, in 2014, Platinum Dunes producers Brad Fuller and Andrew Form confirmed that the remake was no longer in development.

== Soundtrack ==
The Monster Squad

Film score by Bruce Broughton
- Released: October 8, 2007
- Recorded: 20th Century-Fox Studios, Los Angeles
- Genre: Orchestral
- Length: 57:24
- Label: Intrada Records
- Producer: Bruce Broughton

The Monster Squad's score was composed and conducted by Bruce Broughton, and performed by the Hollywood Studio Symphony. Film Score Monthly called it "one of the most full-blooded and enjoyable scores of the late 1980s", rating it four stars out of four.

Singer and producer Michael Sembello also contributed two original songs, "Rock Until You Drop" and "The Monster Squad Rap", the latter of which humorously credits the titular Monster Squad as performers. The original version of the rap includes a direct reference to the Creature from the Black Lagoon, although it was edited from the 1988 home video.

The film's soundtrack was released on CD for the first time in 2007 via Intrada Records. La-La Land Records reissued it in 2015. The new CD contained alternate versions, diegetic tracks and the two Sembello songs, which were absent from the Intrada pressing. The soundtrack debuted in vinyl from Mondo in 2016. This version retains the Sembello songs but omits the alternate and diegetic tracks. Mondo has also released the two Sembello songs in 7-inch single format.

== See also ==
- List of films featuring Frankenstein's monster
- List of monster movies
- Vampire film
