= Sam Kazemian =

Iranian-American software programmer (born 1993)

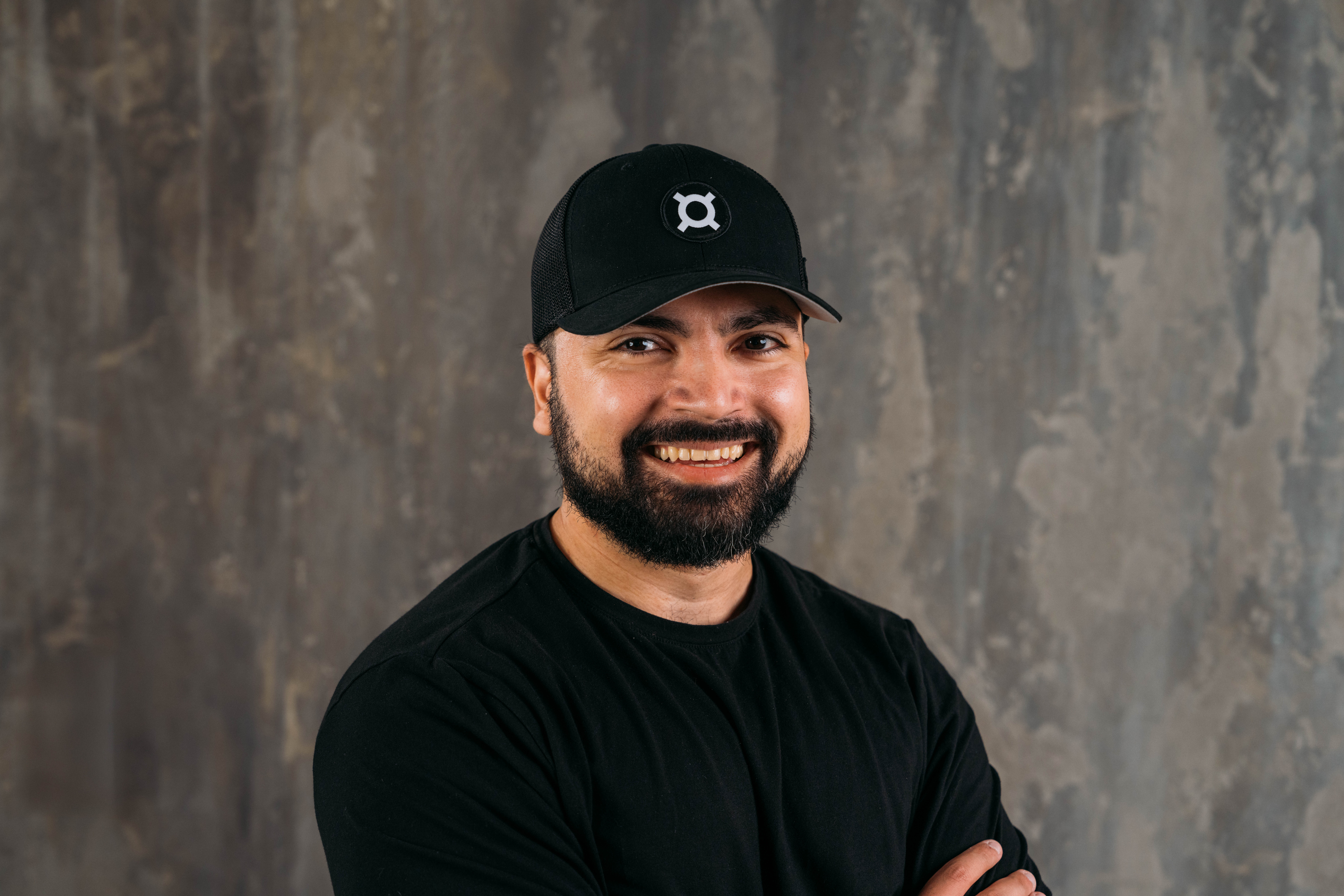
- Sam Kazemian in 2024
- Born: Sam Hamidi-Kazemian; February 12, 1993 (age 32)
- Education: University of California, Los Angeles
- Occupation: Founder of Frax Finance
- Known for: Founding Frax Finance & Co-founding Everipedia

Sam Hamidi-Kazemian (Persian: سام حمیدی‌کاظمیان; born February 12, 1993) is an Iranian-American software programmer. He is the founder of Frax Finance, a decentralized stablecoin cryptocurrency protocol. Previously, he co-founded Everipedia, a for-profit, wiki-based online encyclopedia. He founded Everipedia with Theodor Forselius in December 2014 and later served as its President. In 2019, he began development of Frax, a fractional stablecoin cryptocurrency. As of January 2022, Frax is ranked the 5th largest stablecoin by market capitalization according to cryptocurrency ranking website Defipulse.com.

== Biography ==
=== Education ===
Kazemian attended Westlake High School, where he participated in athletics. He was a member of the UCLA Powerlifting team from 2012 until 2015. He graduated from the University of California, Los Angeles (UCLA) in 2015.

=== Career ===
Starting as a small project in Kazemian's dormitory room at UCLA, Sam Kazemian founded Everipedia with Theodor Forselius in December 2014.

In 2017, Kazemian told Boing Boing that "Wikia, like Wikipedia, uses really old software that was built in 2001. Meanwhile there are all these new, modern crowd-knowledge sites like Rap Genius, Quora and StackOverflow, but nobody ever tried to attack the original beast —a wiki of everything— with the new, modern tools. That is what Everipedia aims to do." In 2019, Kazemian founded Frax, a stablecoin cryptocurrency protocol. In 2023, Forbes listed Kazemian in their 30 Under 30 in finance for founding Frax, citing the project's notable growth and $86 million of revenue in its first year of operation with only 8 employees. In 2022, Kazemian and Balaji Srinivasan were credited for inventing a new category of cryptocurrency, known as 'flatcoins,' that are pegged to the Consumer Price Index rather than a national currency such as USD. Frax issued the first known flatcoin cryptocurrency in 2022 named the Frax Price Index.

== Personal life ==
Kazemian is a first generation immigrant from an Iranian family.
