= Andre Gower =

American television and film actor (born 1973)

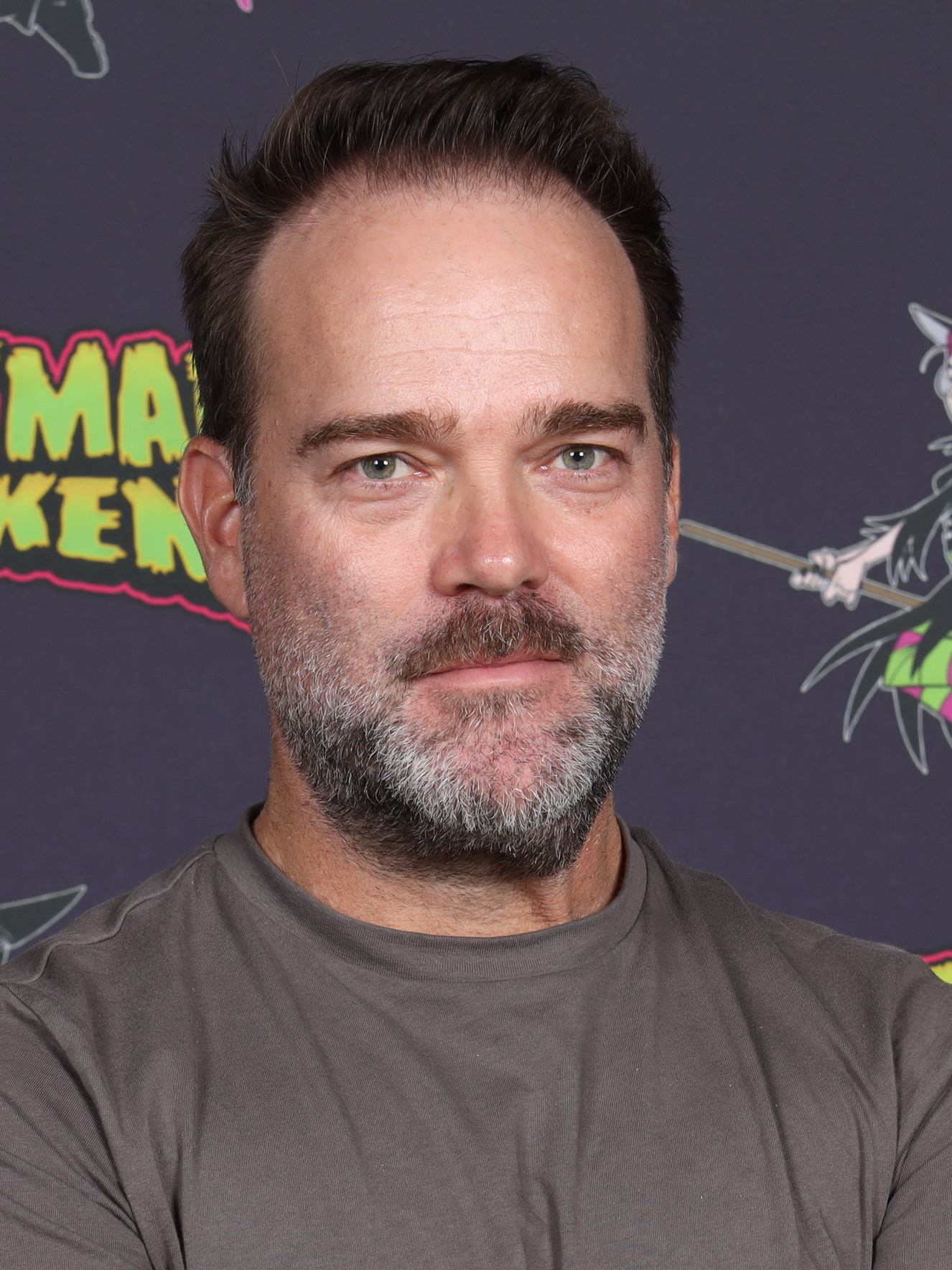
- Gower in 2024
- Born: Jon Andre Gower; April 27, 1973 (age 53); Los Angeles, California, U.S.
- Other name: André Gower
- Occupations: Actor; producer; director
- Years active: 1979–present
- Website: www.andregower.com

Jon Andre Gower (born April 27, 1973) is an American television and film actor.

== Life and career ==
Born in Los Angeles, California to a family of actors, Gower began his career at the age of five years. His sister, Carlena Gower starred in the Irwin Allen 1970's blockbuster, The Towering Inferno. His first substantial role was as Brooks Prentiss on the CBS soap opera The Young and the Restless from 1981 to 1982. He continued with guest starring roles on The A-Team, T. J. Hooker, and The Wizard. In 1986, he starred with Oscar-nominated Piper Laurie in an episode of The Twilight Zone, "The Burning Man". In 1987, Gower starred in the comedy/horror film The Monster Squad. Later that year, he starred for two seasons on the Fox series Mr. President with George C. Scott. From 1988 to 1989, Gower had a recurring role on The Hogan Family. Gower currently coaches actors and others entering the entertainment industry.

On November 5, 2014, Gower appeared on Ken Reid's TV Guidance Counselor Podcast.

Since 2016, Gower and one of his The Monster Squad castmates, Ryan Lambert, have been co-hosts of the Squadcast w/Ryan & Andre Podcast, for Fitterpiper Entertainment. The podcast covers The Monster Squad, as well as other films, and conventions that Gower and Lambert attend in support of The Monster Squad and its legacy.

In 2018, Gower produced and directed a documentary about the legacy, cult following, and fans of The Monster Squad, titled Wolfman's Got Nards.

On July 3, 2021, Gower nearly died after he suffered a massive heart attack while playing tennis with a friend. Gower needed a pacemaker installed in his heart. "my right coronary artery ended up being 100 percent blocked with a giant blood clot... Apparently, according to the people that worked on me and the excellent cath lab team, we got here with about 10 minutes to spare" Gower said in a Facebook video filmed from his hospital bed. A GoFundMe was set up to help pay for Gower's medical bills.

== Filmography ==
Film
Year	Film	Role	Notes
1983	Kiss My Grits	Boots	
1987	The Monster Squad	Sean Crenshaw	Credited as André Gower
2006	Sweet Deadly Dreams	Bernstein	
2018	Wolfman's Got Nards	Himself	Producer/Director
Television
Year	Title	Role	Notes
1979	The Man in the Santa Claus Suit	Terry Travis	Television movie
1981–1982	The Young and the Restless	Brooks Prentiss #3	Unknown episodes
1983	Baby Makes Five	Michael Riddle	Unknown episodes
1984	St. Elsewhere	Tucker	1 episode
1984	The A-Team	Billy Lawrence	1 episode
1984	Highway to Heaven	Tom Barney	1 episode
1985	Obsessed with a Married Woman	Max Karasick	Television movie
1985	Knight Rider	Billy	1 episode
1985	Night Court	Brian Reader	1 episode
1985	T.J. Hooker	Tommy Hooker	1 episode
1985	The Twilight Zone	Doug the Nephew	1 episode (segment "The Burning Man")
1985	It's a Living		1 episode
1986	Remington Steele	Daniel Piper	1 episode
1986	Fathers and Sons	Sean Flynn	1 episode
1986	The Wizard	Todd	1 episode
1987	Mathnet	Eddie "Rimshot" Harris	1 episode
1987	Square One Television	Eddie "Rimshot" Harris	4 episodes
1987	Mr. President	Nick Tresch	Unknown episodes
1988	My Two Dads	Marshall	1 episode
1988–1989	The Hogan Family	Steve Traeger	6 episodes
1989	Mr. Belvedere	Craig Larabee	1 episode

== Awards and nominations ==
Year	Award	Result	Category	Film or series
1983	Young Artist Award	Nominated	Best Young Actor in a Daytime Series	The Young and the Restless
1984	Young Artist Award	Nominated	Best Young Actor in a Comedy Series	Baby Makes Five
1987	Young Artist Award	Nominated	Exceptional Performance by a Young Actor in a New Television, Comedy or Drama Series	Fathers and Sons
1988	Young Artist Award	Nominated	Exceptional Performance by a Young Actor in a Television Comedy Series	Mr. President
1988	Young Artist Award	Won	Outstanding Young Actors/Actresses Ensemble in Television or Motion Picture	The Monster Squad (Shared with cast)
1989	Young Artist Award	Nominated	Best Young Actor Guest Starring in a Drama or Comedy Series	The Hogan Family
1988	Saturn Award	Nominated	Best Performance by a Younger Actor	The Monster Squad

== Bibliography ==
- Holmstrom, John. The Moving Picture Boy: An International Encyclopaedia from 1895 to 1995. Norwich, Michael Russell, 1996, p. 392-393.
