= Jonni Cheatwood =

American artist

Jonni Cheatwood (born July 21, 1986, in Thousand Oaks, California) is an American visual artist. His main body of work operates in the gap between abstract expressionism, surrealism and conceptual art experimenting with various genres and techniques in his work. He currently lives and works in Los Angeles.

== Early life and education ==
Cheatwood was born and raised in Thousand Oaks, California, a suburb in the northwestern part of the Greater Los Angeles area. He attended Simi Valley High School, Oaks Christian School and graduated from Westlake High School in 2004. He would leave southern California after graduation to attend Northern Arizona University in Flagstaff, Arizona and then in 2006, he transferred to Arizona State University. While attending ASU, Cheatwood began to paint.

Cheatwood graduated from Arizona State University in 2011 with a Bachelor's in Secondary Education and Film & Media Production.

== Work ==
The bulk of Jonni's work incorporates photographs, generally self-portraits. He uses those images as a canvas to drip paint onto and calls these portraits "drippies." Cheatwood's large-scale abstract paintings imply movement and chaos that consist of sewn together canvas, denim, linens and burlap that often incorporate fragments of text, shoe prints, coffee and debris such as dirt.

In 2012, Cheatwood was first noticed in The Next Artspace Artist competition, which was put on in collaboration with Artspace and Tumblr for his "Grace Series." Following that competition, this series was featured in the third issue of Fashion for Men magazine by Milan Vukmirovic, Ignant.de, Trendland and FFFFOUND and numerous other publications.

Cheatwood also created the artwork for Kitty Cash's Love the Free, Volume 2 mixtape and his "Grace Series" can be seen in Usher's music video, She Came to Give It to You.
