= Jordan Michaels =

American digital healthcare entrepreneur

- Born: Jordan Michaels
- Education: University of Southern California (B.S.)
- Known for: Founding Ringadoc

Jordan Michaels is an American digital healthcare entrepreneur, vice president of operations at GoodRx and a stand-up comedian. Michaels is the co-founder of Ringadoc. Raised in Southern California, Michaels is a graduate of Westlake High School and the University of Southern California, where he studied pre-medicine and neuroscience.

Michaels has been recognized as an entrepreneur. In 2010, he co-founded Ringadoc, a telemedicine service company that allows doctors to interact with patients via a web browser or mobile application. In 2014, Practice Fusion acquired Ringadoc. Michaels provides commentary on health technology, prescription drug prices in the United States, and the general state of health care in the United States.

Michaels performs stand-up comedy. He has performed at The Improv and The Comedy Store.

== Education ==
Michaels attended Westlake High School, where he participated in the Advanced Anatomy program. He graduated in 2005 as the salutatorian.

Michaels attended the University of Southern California where he studied pre-medicine. As a premed student, Michaels was interested in the intersections between technology, media and medicine. In 2009, Michaels graduated Phi Beta Kappa with a Bachelor of Arts in Neuroscience and Biological Sciences. By 2010, Michaels had gained admission to several medical schools in the United States, and received a deferral to pursue Ringadoc. In 2012, Michaels officially decided to forgo medical school to focus on Ringadoc full-time.

== Career ==
=== Ringadoc ===
In 2010, Michaels co-founded the telemedicine company Ringadoc. Ringadoc connects patients to doctors by phone to a doctor anywhere, as long as the doctor is anywhere in the state in which the patient is physically present. Users of Ringadoc initially could record an audio summary of their medical history and a video describing their medical concern, which the doctor consults before speaking with the patient. According to Michaels, Ringadoc is for short-term health issues that might need quick prescriptions when patients are not able to get to a doctor, or if an appointment is unnecessary. Michaels did not envision telemedicine replacing primary care. Ringadoc launched in October 2010.

By 2012, Ringadoc was only up and running in California, but the company expected to be up and running in twenty American states in 2013. Entrepreneur (magazine) named Ringadoc one of the 100 brilliant companies of 2012. Into 2013, Ringadoc had handled over one hundred thousand calls from patients. Michaels said Ringadoc dropped the video-enabled app to focus on phone consultations. Michaels explained that, after patients call a doctor who use Ringadoc, the responding doctor will either respond via text message or phone call. The company began to target physicians with an after hours service, rather than anytime service.

The company raised 1.2 million dollars in seed funding. Ringadoc received financing from Founders Fund, other venture capital firms, Practice Fusion Founder and CEO Ryan Howard, and former president of One Medical Group Sharon Knight, among others. In 2014, Practice Fusion acquired Ringadoc. After leaving Ringadoc, Michaels briefly worked in the space of electronic health records.

=== GoodRx ===
After leaving Ringadoc, Michaels took over as director of operations at GoodRx. GoodRx is a website and mobile app that tracks prescription drug prices and offers drug coupons in the United States. Michaels serves as vice president at GoodRx, and continues to provide commentary on the evolution of digital healthcare.
