= 2018 NBA 2K League season =

- League: NBA 2K League
- Sport: NBA 2K
- Duration: May 1 – August 25, 2018
- Games: 14
- Teams: 17
- TV partner: Twitch

Draft
- Top draft pick: Dimez
- Picked by: Mavs Gaming

Regular season
- Top seed: Blazer5 Gaming
- Season MVP: OneWildWalnut (Blazer5 Gaming)

Playoffs
- Finals champions: Knicks Gaming
- Runners-up: Heat Check Gaming
- Finals MVP: NateKahl (Knicks Gaming)

Seasons
- 2019 →

The 2018 NBA 2K League season was the inaugural season of the NBA 2K League, an esports league based on the basketball video game series NBA 2K. The season opened with the Tip-Off Tournament, which ran from May 1–5, 2018, where 76ers GC defeated Blazer5 Gaming. The season culminated on August 25, 2018, when Knicks Gaming defeated Heat Check Gaming in a best-of-three finals to become the first playoff champions in league history. Other tournaments included The Turn (where Blazer5 Gaming defeated Celtics Crossover Gaming) and The Ticket (where Knicks Gaming defeated Celtics Crossover Gaming).

== Qualifying ==
For the inaugural season, the qualifying stage was open to anyone who was 18+ years old and owned NBA 2K18 on either PlayStation 4 or Xbox One. To qualify, players had to win 50 games in NBA 2K18's Pro-Am mode and submit an application following this requirement between January 1–31, 2018. Following that, the players who qualified participated in a combine that ran from February 2–21, 2018. The top 102 players out of the 72,000 who qualified were then drafted on April 4.

== Teams ==
On December 11, 2017, the official logo for the NBA 2K League was revealed, with the logos for each of the 17 teams being revealed over the course of the following days.

Team	NBA Team Owner
76ers GC	Philadelphia 76ers
Blazer5 Gaming	Portland Trail Blazers
Bucks Gaming	Milwaukee Bucks
Cavs Legion GC	Cleveland Cavaliers
Celtics Crossover Gaming	Boston Celtics
Grizz Gaming	Memphis Grizzlies
Heat Check Gaming	Miami Heat
Jazz Gaming	Utah Jazz
Kings Guard Gaming	Sacramento Kings
Knicks Gaming	New York Knicks
Magic Gaming	Orlando Magic
Mavs Gaming	Dallas Mavericks
Pacers Gaming	Indiana Pacers
Pistons GT	Detroit Pistons
Raptors Uprising GC	Toronto Raptors
Warriors Gaming Squad	Golden State Warriors
Wizards District Gaming	Washington Wizards

== Inaugural draft ==
On April 4, 2018, the inaugural draft took place and was broadcast on NBA TV (first round only) and Twitch. The draft used a snake draft format with NBA Commissioner Adam Silver announcing the first pick, NBA 2K League managing director Brendan Donohue announcing the rest of the picks. The draft took place in the Hulu Theater at Madison Square Garden. For the first five rounds, each team was required to choose one player at each position, and in the sixth round team were allowed to choose any remaining player, regardless of their position.

=== Draft lottery ===
A non-weighted lottery took place on March 13, 2018, to determine the order of the draft.

== Standings ==
Key
	Won League Championship
	Won Tournament
^{y}	Regular season best record
^{x}	Qualified for the postseason
^{g}	Won Tournament Group

=== Regular season ===
- "Seeding Hierarchy" (all based on regular season games)
1. Win–loss record
2. Head-to-head matchup
3. Average point differential
4. Total points scored
5. Coin flip
- Note: Knicks Gaming automatically clinched a playoff berth by winning The Ticket tournament.

Place	Team	W	L	PCT	GB	GP
1	Blazer5 Gaming^{x}	12	2	.857	–	14
2	76ers GC^{x}	10	4	.714	2	14
3	Pistons GT^{x}	9	5	.643	3	14
4	Raptors Uprising GC^{x}	8	6	.571	4	14
5	Cavs Legion GC^{x}	8	6	.571	4	14
6	Heat Check Gaming^{x}	8	6	.571	4	14
7	Wizards District Gaming^{x}	8	6	.571	4	14
8	Magic Gaming	8	6	.571	4	14
9	Celtics Crossover Gaming	7	7	.500	5	14
10	Grizz Gaming	6	8	.429	6	14
11	Bucks Gaming	6	8	.429	6	14
12	Mavs Gaming	6	8	.429	6	14
13	Pacers Gaming	5	9	.357	7	14
14	Knicks Gaming^{x}	5	9	.357	7	14
15	Jazz Gaming	5	9	.357	7	14
16	Warriors Gaming Squad	4	10	.286	8	14
17	Kings Guard Gaming	4	10	.286	8	14

=== Tournaments ===
==== Tip Off Tournament ====
- Prize Pool:
  - 1st: $35,000
  - 2nd: $25,000
  - 3rd and 4th: $10,000
  - Group Winners: $5,000
  - Total: $100,000
- MVP: Radiant (76ers GC)

Team	Record	Group	Place
76ers GC	5–1	Group C	1st
Blazer5 Gaming^{g}	5–1	Group C	2nd
Cavs Legion GC^{g}	3–2	Group A	T-3rd
Pistons GT	3–2	Group A	T-3rd
Mavs Gaming^{g}	3–2	Group D	T-5th
Pacers Gaming	3–2	Group D	T-5th
Jazz Gaming	2–2	Group B	T-5th
Warriors Gaming Squad^{g}	2–2	Group B	T-5th
Celtics Crossover Gaming	3–1	Group D	-
Bucks Gaming	1–2	Group A	-
Kings Guard Gaming	1–2	Group A	-
Knicks Gaming	1–2	Group B	-
Raptors Uprising GC	1–2	Group C	-
Wizards District Gaming	1–2	Group B	-
Heat Check Gaming	1–3	Group D	-
Magic Gaming	0–3	Group C	-
Grizz Gaming	0–4	Group D	-

==== The Turn ====
- Prize Pool:
  - 1st: $75,600
  - 2nd: $24,800
  - 3rd and 4th: $12,800
  - 5th–8th: $6,000
  - Total: $150,000
- MVP: Mama Im Dat Man (Blazer5 Gaming)

Seed	Team	Record	Place
1	Blazer5 Gaming	4–0	1st
11	Celtics Crossover Gaming	3–1	2nd
2	76ers GC	2–1	T-3rd
12	Knicks Gaming	2–1	T-3rd
3	Mavs Gaming	1–1	T-5th
7	Wizards District Gaming	1–1	T-5th
9	Magic Gaming	1–1	T-5th
13	Warriors Gaming Squad	1–1	T-5th
4	Pistons GT	0–1	-
5	Cavs Legion GC	0–1	-
6	Jazz Gaming	0–1	-
8	Kings Guard Gaming	0–1	-
10	Heat Check Gaming	0–1	-
14	Bucks Gaming	0–1	-
15	Grizz Gaming	0–1	-
16	Raptors Uprising GC	1–1	-
17	Pacers Gaming	0–1	-

==== The Ticket ====
- Prize Pool:
  - 1st: $75,600
  - 2nd: $24,800
  - 3rd and 4th: $12,800
  - 5th–8th: $6,000
  - Total: $150,000
- MVP: iamadamthe1st (Knicks Gaming)

Seed	Team	Record	Place
15	Knicks Gaming	4–0	1st
8	Celtics Crossover Gaming	3–1	2nd
5	Pistons GT	2–1	T-3rd
6	Cavs Legion GC	2–1	T-3rd
10	Wizards District Gaming	1–1	T-5th
13	Bucks Gaming	1–1	T-5th
14	Mavs Gaming	1–1	T-5th
17	Kings Guard Gaming	2–1	T-5th
1	Blazer5 Gaming	0–1	-
2	Raptors Uprising GC	0–1	-
3	Pacers Gaming	0–1	-
4	76ers GC	0–1	-
7	Heat Check Gaming	0–1	-
9	Grizz Gaming	0–1	-
11	Magic Gaming	0–1	-
12	Jazz Gaming	0–1	-
16	Warriors Gaming Squad	0–1	-

== Postseason ==
Finals MVP: NateKahl (Knicks Gaming)

Quarterfinals
1	Blazer5 Gaming	0
8	Knicks Gaming	1
4	Raptors Uprising GC	0
5	Cavs Legion GC	1
3	Pistons GT	0
6	Heat Check Gaming	1
2	76ers GC	1
7	Wizards District Gaming	0

Semifinals
8	Knicks Gaming	2
5	Cavs Legion GC	1
6	Heat Check Gaming	2
2	76ers GC	0

Finals
8	Knicks Gaming	2
6	Heat Check Gaming	0

== Awards ==
2018 NBA 2K League Awards
Award	Recipient
Most Valuable Player	OneWildWalnut (Dayne Downey) (Blazer5 Gaming)
Coach of the Year	Duane Burton (Pistons GT)
Defensive Player of the Year	OneWildWalnut (Dayne Downey) (Blazer5 Gaming)
Community Engagement Award	Raptors Uprising GC
Sportsmanship Award	xTFr3sHxX (Tilton Curry) (76ers GC)
Play of the Year	Boo Painter (Austin Painter) (Wizards District Gaming)
