= NBA 2K League =

Esports league joint venture

- Game: NBA 2K
- Founded: February 9, 2017; 9 years ago New York City, U.S.
- First season: 2018
- Owners: NBA Take-Two Media; NBA (50%); Take-Two Interactive (50%)
- CEO: Andrew Perlmutter
- Commissioner: Jess "Jesser" Riedel (honorary)
- No. of teams: 6
- Countries: United States (6 teams)
- Headquarters: New York City
- Most recent champions: Memphis Grizzlies (MyPlayer Mayhem 2v2 and 3v3) (2025)
- Most titles: Warriors Gaming Squad (2 titles - 5v5), Pistons GT (1 title - 3v3),
- Broadcasters: Twitch (2018–present); YouTube (2019–present); ESPN2 (2020) (select games); ESPN App (2020); TSN (select games) (2020); Stadium (2022–2024) (select games); NBA TV (2022–2024) (select games)
- Website: nba2kleague.com

The NBA 2K League (NBA 2KL or simply 2K League) is an esports league joint venture between the National Basketball Association (NBA) and Take-Two Interactive owned through NBA Take-Two Media. The league under its original form was announced in 2017 with its inaugural season taking place in 2018. There were 22 NBA teams that had teams, with a few independent teams also competing. The league would go on hiatus in 2024 before relaunching in 2025 under a revamped, creator-focused format.

== History ==
The inaugural 2018 season lasted for 17 weeks, beginning with the tip-off tournament from May 1–5, with the first weekly matchups taking place on May 11–12. There were an additional two tournaments during the season before the playoffs began on August 17, concluding with the NBA 2K League Finals on August 25. All games were live-streamed on Twitch and available to view on demand after the live broadcasts.

The league used Pro-Am mode for the games, which consisted of 5-on-5 matches where players used archetypes with preset skills instead of their own MyPlayer or NBA players to keep the ratings similar to everyone.

A special build of the newest NBA 2K game is used for the league, with equipment provided by Alienware and Intel. HyperX is the league's headset sponsor, while Scuf Gaming provides controllers for all matches. To go along with the league sponsors, each team also has various sponsors and displays the logos of the sponsors on their in-game uniforms. All games are played at the NBA 2K League Studio in New York.

In September 2020, the league designed a new draft system for the 2021 season.

In August 2021, the league announced that in-person events would return to play during the 2021 playoffs, which was held August 26–28, 2021. Also in August, the league announced its first all-star game that was played on September 25.

In the 2022 season, the league added a distinct 3v3 season to alternate with the traditional 5v5 mode. Both modes saw the removal of regular season play in favor of tournaments a seed weeks to determine playoff standings. In-person games took place in Indianapolis, Indiana at the Pan-Am Pavilion, with teams playing from their local markets and flying to Indianapolis for tournament bracket play and playoff games. The league introduced amateur competition to the 3v3 season as well, enabling amateur teams to compete with NBA 2K League teams in group play and earn points toward two dedicated 3v3 playoff spots for amateur teams. Pistons GT won the first-ever NBA 2K League 3v3 Finals, defeating Wizards District Gaming. Bucks Gaming won its first-ever 5v5 championship, also defeating Wizards District Gaming.

For the 2023 season, the league altered the format to separate the 3v3 and 5v5 splits, as well as extending the tournament group play process and removing the additional seed week games. Central market games were moved to District E. The 3v3 split featured a new double-elimination format for tournament and playoff bracket playoff. DUX Infinitos claimed the 3v3 title for the first time in franchise history, defeating Pistons GT in a bracket reset finals. For 5v5, tournaments remained single elimination. Warriors Gaming Squad won the 5v5 championship over NBL Oz Gaming in a 3-1 best-of-five series.

Following the 2023 season, the NBA announced that league president Brendan Donohue, who had overseen league operations since its inception, would step down from his position. The league subsequently named Andrew Perlmutter as CEO. On July 2, 2024, following the conclusion of the 2024 season, Perlmutter called all league players and staff in a 10-minute video call and announcing that he is firing everyone in a mass layoff. Subsequently, the league announced that it will go on hiatus for eighteen months while it undergoes a major overhaul amidst recent challenges in the esports industry as a whole. The overhaul will be more social-oriented, with an added focus on influencers and celebrities. The league's new reliance on "influencer culture" has been met with a negative response from fans.

The NBA 2K League would officially relaunch on November 4, 2025. A multi-year deal was signed between NBA 2K Media and the National Basketball Players Association, the NBA's players' union, which allowed them to work directly with active NBA players. Jess "Jesser" Riedel would be named the new "honorary" commissioner of the league. Only 6 teams returned for the start of the revamped 2025 season, all of them being NBA teams.

== Broadcast partners ==
Games are live streamed on the NBA 2K League Twitch and YouTube channels.

On April 18, 2018, the NBA 2K League and Twitch announced a multiyear partnership to live stream all games. The inaugural season began on May 1, 2018 and concluded on August 25, 2018 with Knicks Gaming (affiliated with the NBA's New York Knicks) winning the inaugural NBA 2K League championship. For season 2, the rights to live stream the league's games went to YouTube and Twitch.

NBA 2K and ESPN agreed to broadcast the games on ESPN2 and the ESPN App for the league's third season. The third season was planned to start on March 31, 2020, but the season was postponed to May 5, 2020 due to the COVID-19 pandemic, and was subsequently played fully remotely. In the same year, the league agreed to a broadcast deal with Loco, a live streaming and esports platform in India, which was renewed in 2022.

In 2022 Stadium, NBA TV and the league agreed to broadcast select playoff and championship games.

== Format ==
The NBA 2K League plays on a custom version of the NBA 2K video game. Players compete as unique custom characters (not as avatars of NBA players) in 3-on-3 and 5-on-5 gameplay. No artificial intelligence is used; playing ability is strictly determined by skill.

As of 2023, the league season was composed of two game modes, beginning with the 3v3 season followed by the 5v5 season. Teams played in two tournaments per split—the Slam and the Switch in 3v3 and the Tipoff and the Turn in 5v5—to earn prize money and standings points toward playoff qualification, with the top 10 teams earning an automatic playoff bid. In 3v3, the 10 teams were determined regardless of conference, while in 5v5, five teams per conference earned qualification. Following the two tournaments, teams that did not qualify automatically for the playoffs competed in a last-chance tournament—the Steal in 3v3 and the Ticket in 5v5—with the two teams advancing to the finals of the last-chance tournament earning the final playoff berths, as well as additional prize money.

In the 5v5 playoffs, the 12 teams competed in a single-elimination tournament comprising best-of-three series, split by conference, until the best-of-five NBA 2K League 5v5 Finals. In 3v3, the playoffs featured 14 teams, with the 12 NBA 2K League teams joined by two amateur teams (having qualified for the seasonal tournaments through amateur play-ins and qualifying for the 3v3 playoffs by performance in the 3v3 tournaments). The 3v3 playoffs featured a double-elimination format and best-of-five series until the best-of-seven NBA 2K League 3v3 Finals.

Since 2020, the league utilized a hybrid remote/in-person model, with teams playing some games from their home market and some games in a central location. From 2018 to 2019, the league played its games in Long Island City. In 2020, the league was fully remote due to the COVID-19 pandemic. In 2021, the league conducted play remotely until the playoffs, which took place in Dallas at the Mavs Gaming facility. In 2022, in-person games were played in Indianapolis at the Pan-Am Pavilion. In 2023 and 2024, in-person games were played at District E in Washington D.C.

When the 2K League returned in 2025, it utilized a revamped format with 2 initial phases, MyPlayer Mayhem and Next Fan Up. MyPlayer Mayhem consisted of 6 teams, each one having their own influencer as captain, before the teams competed in two tournaments, the first being 2v2 and the second being 3v3. Next Fan Up was an open ladder tournament open to anybody who had a copy of NBA 2K26, with participants able to represent any NBA team, not just those that were in MyPlayer Mayhem, and climb the ranks, with a chance to earn both physical and digital prizes.

== Player selection, eligibility, and benefits ==
During the league's original run, players joined the league by being drafted to an NBA 2K League team or added to a team roster as part of an add/waive roster process. In order to qualify for the league draft, players were required to be over the age of 18 and must have graduated from high school (or, if the player did not graduate, the class with which the player would have graduated must have graduated). The league had historically assembled a draft pool, from which teams could select players, through qualification tournaments run by 2K League teams or competitions in the year's iteration of NBA 2K. Players in the draft pool also had the opportunity to participate in the NBA 2K League combine. Players were drafted into the league at the NBA 2K League Draft, which took place before the season.

Players signed six-month contracts and had their relocation and housing costs covered by the league and teams, as well as benefits such as medical insurance and a retirement plan. Food, transportation, and housing was also covered during the season when teams traveled for games.

During the six-month season, players drafted in the first round made a base salary of $35,000, while players drafted in subsequent rounds made $33,000. Players retained by teams following a season in the league earned $38,000. Players could also earn money through the league's $2.5 million prize pool, which was split across all tournaments and playoffs throughout the season, as well as seasonal individual awards. Players were also allowed to sign endorsement deals to earn extra income.

== Teams ==
On December 11, 2017, the official logo for the NBA 2K League was revealed, with the logos for each of the 17 teams being revealed over the course of the following days. On August 15, 2018, it was announced that the league would expand to 21 teams in 2019 with the addition of teams from Atlanta, Brooklyn, Los Angeles, and Minnesota. The league grew to 23 teams in 2020 with the additions of Charlotte and Gen.G, the first team outside of North America. The league expanded to Mexico in 2022 with the addition of Dux Gaming, who became the 24th team in the league. The league expanded to Australia in 2023 with the introduction of NBL Oz Gaming, operated by Australia's National Basketball League, as the 25th team.

When the NBA 2K League was relaunched in 2025, only 6 of the previous 25 franchises returned, all of them being NBA teams. With the exception of Raptors Uprising GC, tied to the Toronto Raptors, none of the returning teams retained their 2K League-specific branding.

Overview of current NBA 2K League teams
Team	Former name/NBA affiliate (if applicable)	Inaugural season	3V3 Championships	5V5 Championships	MyPlayer Mayhem Championships
Boston Celtics	Celtics Crossover Gaming	2018	-		
Memphis Grizzlies	Grizz Gaming	2018	-		2 (2025 2v2, 2025 3v3)
Utah Jazz	Jazz Gaming	2018	-		
Detroit Pistons	Pistons GT	2018	1 (2022)	-	
Raptors Uprising GC	Toronto Raptors (NBA affiliate)	2018	-		
Washington Wizards	Wizards District Gaming	2018	-	2 (2020, 2021)	-

Overview of formerNBA 2K League teams
Team	NBA affiliate	Inaugural season	Last season	3V3 Championships	5V5 Championships
76ers GC	Philadelphia 76ers	2018	2024	-	
Blazer5 Gaming	Portland Trail Blazers	2018	2024	-	
Bucks Gaming	Milwaukee Bucks	2018	2024	-	1 (2022)
Cavs Legion GC	Cleveland Cavaliers	2018	2024	-	
DUX Infinitos	None	2022	2024	1 (2023)	-
Gen.G Tigers	None	2020	2024	-	
Hawks Talon GC	Atlanta Hawks	2019	2024	-	
Hornets Venom GT	Charlotte Hornets	2020	2024	-	
Heat Check Gaming	Miami Heat	2018	2024	-	
Kings Guard Gaming	Sacramento Kings	2018	2024	-	
Knicks Gaming	New York Knicks	2018	2024	-	1 (2018)
Lakers Gaming	Los Angeles Lakers	2019	2024	1 (2024)	-
Magic Gaming	Orlando Magic	2018	2024	-	
Mavs Gaming	Dallas Mavericks	2018	2024	-	
NBL Oz Gaming	None	2023	2024	-	
Nets GC	Brooklyn Nets	2019	2024	-	
Pacers Gaming	Indiana Pacers	2018	2024	-	
T-Wolves Gaming	Minnesota Timberwolves	2019	2024	-	1 (2019)
Warriors Gaming Squad	Golden State Warriors	2018	2024	-	2 (2023, 2024)
