= Ja'seem Reed =

American football player (born 2003)

No. 86 – Carolina Panthers
- Position: Wide receiver
- Roster status: Practice squad

Personal information
- Born: March 21, 2003 (age 23); Thousand Oaks, California, U.S.
- Listed height: 6 ft 2 in (1.88 m)
- Listed weight: 195 lb (88 kg)

Career information
- High school: Westlake (Thousand Oaks)
- College: San Diego (2021–2024)
- NFL draft: 2025: undrafted

Career history
- Cleveland Browns (2025)*; Carolina Panthers (2025–present)*
- * Offseason or practice squad member only

Awards and highlights
- First-team All-PFL (2024); PFL Offensive Player of the Year (2024); All-PFL Honorable Mention (2022, 2023)
- Stats at Pro Football Reference

Ja'seem Reed (born March 21, 2003) is an American professional football wide receiver for the Carolina Panthers of the National Football League (NFL). He played college football for the San Diego Toreros and signed with the Cleveland Browns after going unselected in the 2025 NFL draft.

== Early life ==
Reed was born in Thousand Oaks, California. He attended Westlake High School and received only one offer for football, that being from the University of San Diego. He accepted the lone offer to play for the Toreros football program.

== College career ==
Reed played in all 11 games as a freshman at San Diego in 2021. He recorded his first career collegiate touchdown against Stetson. In his sophomore year, he recorded 339 yards and 4 touchdowns, including a 34-yard touchdown and 21-yard touchdown at Valparaiso. Following the season, he was named All-PFL Honorable Mention. In 2023, he led his team in both receptions and yards. Following the year, he was again named All-PFL Honorable Mention.

His senior year, 2024, he was the lone 1,000-yard receiver in the Pioneer Football League and was named First-team All-PFL as well as PFL Offensive player of the year.

== Professional career ==
Pre-draft measurables
Height	Weight	Arm length	Hand span	Wingspan	40-yard dash	10-yard split	20-yard split	Vertical jump	Broad jump	Bench press
6 ft 1 1/4 in (1.86 m)	190 lb (86 kg)	32 in (0.81 m)	9 3/4 in (0.25 m)	6 ft 4 5/8 in (1.95 m)	4.55 s	1.64 s	2.65 s	32.0 in (0.81 m)	10 ft 7 in (3.23 m)	9 reps
All values from Pro Day

=== Cleveland Browns ===
Directly after going undrafted in the 2025 NFL draft, on April 27, 2025, Reed signed a 3 year, $2.975 million contract with the Cleveland Browns. On June 17, Reed was waived off of IR by the Browns.

=== Carolina Panthers ===
On July 29, 2025, after working out with the team, Reed was signed by the Carolina Panthers. Veteran Dan Chisena was released to make room for him on the roster. He was waived from the active roster on August 26 and then signed to the practice squad on August 28.

On August 30, 2026, Reed was waived by the Panthers as a part of final roster cuts; he was re–signed to the team's practice squad the next day.
