= Everipedia =

Blockchain-based online encyclopedia

- Screenshot
- Website type: Blockchain encyclopedia
- Founded: December 2014; 11 years ago
- Headquarters: {{{location_country}}}
- Founders: Sam Kazemian; Theodor Forselius; Travis Moore; Mahbod Moghadam; Christian Deciga
- Key people: Larry Sanger (CIO), (resigned, 2019); Suchet Dhindsa Salvesen (CFO, COO)
- Industry: Dot-com company
- Current status: Renamed IQ.wiki in 2022
- Content license: Attribution-ShareAlike 4.0 Int'l

Everipedia (/ˌɛvərɪˈpiːdiə/), renamed IQ.wiki in 2022, is a blockchain-based online encyclopedia, originally designed as a general purpose reference but has pivoted to focus on the cryptocurrency space. Everipedia was founded in 2014 and was officially launched in 2015, as a fork of Wikipedia. Larry Sanger (who co-founded Wikipedia) joined the company in 2017, and resigned in 2019.

The company was initially headquartered in Westwood, Los Angeles but has since relocated to 201 Wilshire Boulevard (suite 314) in Santa Monica, California. The site depicts itself as "The World's Largest Blockchain & Crypto Encyclopedia" and formerly as "everyone's encyclopedia".

== History ==
=== Everipedia (2014–2022) ===
Everipedia, a portmanteau of "Everyone's Encyclopedia", began in December 2014 as a small project of Sam Kazemian and Theodor Forselius in Kazemian's college dormitory room at University of California, Los Angeles (UCLA).

The encyclopedia launched in January 2015 as a fork of Wikipedia. Travis Moore joined the company as a co-founder in the winter of 2015 and Mahbod Moghadam joined as a co-founder in July 2015.

The company raised capital and received funding from angel investors. In July 2015, the company got its first seed funding from Mucker Capital and raised close to $130,000 from 201 investors on Wefunder. In October 2015, George Beall was introduced to Everipedia at a presentation in California State University, San Bernardino. After selling his technology start-up Touch Tiles in January 2016, Beall joined the group of co-founders. In 2016, the site generated most of its revenue from advertisements. The company aims to generate income through ways apart from donations or banners.

In January 2017, they had eight full-time workers including two developers. By February 2018, headcount had increased to 15 full-time workers. As of January 2017, they raised $700,000 from angel investors. It was announced on February 8, 2018, that the company raised $30 million in funding headed by Galaxy Digital's EOS.io Ecosystem Fund. In December 2017, Everipedia announced that co-founder of Wikipedia, Larry Sanger, had become the chief information officer of Everipedia. On October 18, 2019, Sanger announced his resignation from this position.

The majority of Everipedia's articles were copied from Wikipedia and promotional material about cryptocurrency and can still be accessed on the former domain.

=== Inactivation and archival (2022–present) ===
Everipedia was converted to a read-only archive in October 2022. Its parent company, IQ, has created a new crypto-only encyclopedia called IQ.wiki.

== Products ==
IQ Token
- IQ token symbol

Denominations
- Code: IQ

Development
- White paper: Whitepaper
- Code repository: EveripediaNetwork
- Development status: Active
- Developer: everipedia.org

Ledger
- Supply limit: 21,000,000,000

Website
- Website: iq.wiki

=== Blockchain signatures ===
On December 6, 2017, the company announced plans to move to generating edits and storing information using the EOS blockchain. After the blockchain is implemented, the company plans to convert the points into a token currency. The tokenized system would let every user become a stakeholder in the wiki network. Each editor will put their token into play for each edit. If their contribution is accepted, the user gets back the token, which will have obtained value in proportion to the content added. If the edit is not accepted, the user does not get their token back.

Everipedia launched on the EOS blockchain on August 9, 2018. Everipedia says the blockchain model does not have centralized servers, therefore eliminating the cost of servers. As Everipedia is decentralized via blockchain, Forselius claims that it is not possible for governments to censor Everipedia by its assigned server IP addresses. On November 3, 2020, the Associated Press began publishing incoming results from that day's 2020 United States presidential election onto the Ethereum and EOS blockchains using the Everipedia OraQle. As of 2022, the company no longer registers signatures on the EOS blockchain and has since been using the Polygon blockchain to generate edits and store information. Polygon allows the signatures to be recorded without any gas fees, unlike other blockchains. The company has plans to support Ethereum and Binance Smart Chain in the future.

== Content and users ==
Everipedia adapted social media elements such as letting celebrities communicate with fans, and allowing users to create pages on any topic as long as the content is cited and neutral.

In March 2016, Everipedia had 200,000 published pages. As of October 2017, the majority of pages on Everipedia were copies of Wikipedia articles. In 2022, cryptocurrency critic and Wikipedia editor Molly White said that Everipedia "is largely still a graveyard of content they've just scraped off Wikipedia, articles that people have written about themselves, and, increasingly, crypto spam." Everipedia reportedly utilized a live Internet bot to monitor Wikipedia for changes, synchronizing such changes but giving preference to local edits on Everipedia.

Everipedia allowed for a larger range of articles than Wikipedia, as the English Wikipedia's notability guidelines are stricter than Everipedia's. Everipedia did not allow censorship on any topic for sourced articles.

There are communities in Brazil, China, Germany, and India. The company said in 2017 that Everipedia had 17,000 registered editors and 2,000 active editors as well as 3 million monthly users. In 2019, Kazemian said there were 7,000 active editors.

Several dozen vandals were banned from Everipedia. In a 2017 interview with Boing Boing, Kazemian claimed that the Everipedia community normally identified a vandal within five minutes. The company had a group of editors who reviewed activity on the site and deleted content that they considered suspicious.

The site frequently focused on trending topics, with the few articles created by users of the site mostly being about sensational topics such as YouTubers, memes, activists, white supremacists, and police shooting victims. The site was criticized for initially presenting false information in wiki pages on breaking news topics. The incidents included identifying innocent people as perpetrators of the 2017 Las Vegas shooting and the United Express Flight 3411 incident. Jeff John Roberts of The Outline raised concerns about the privacy ramifications of Everipedia, which developed many of its articles by gathering content from social media, creating publicly visible entries on non-notable individuals. Roberts also noted that trolls used Everipedia to promote conspiracy theories and defamatory comments.

Everipedia previously offered a service for a monthly fee that allows for users and businesses to create tailored Everipedia entries that get "full-time monitoring for updates and preventing vandalism".

== See also ==
- List of online encyclopedias
