= Wolfman's Got Nards =

2018 documentary film

- Theatrical release poster
- Directed by: Andre Gower
- Written by: Andre Gower; Henry Darrow McComas
- Based on: The Monster Squad by Fred Dekker
- Produced by: Andre Gower
- Starring: Shane Black; Fred Dekker; Seth Green
- Cinematography: Henry Darrow McComas
- Edited by: Henry Darrow McComas
- Release date: 7 April 2018
- Country: United States

Wolfman's Got Nards is a 2018 documentary film directed by Andre Gower that explores the legacy and cult following of the 1987 film The Monster Squad. The documentary takes its title from a famous line in the original film.

== Synopsis ==
The documentary explores the cult status of the 1987 film The Monster Squad. It is framed around the film's 30th anniversary revival tour and focuses into the impact The Monster Squad has had on its fans, cast, and the broader film industry. It features interviews with figures involved in the original film, including cast members and filmmakers, as well as fans who share their personal connections to the movie.

The documentary explores The Monster Squad from its initial release, where it was deemed a commercial failure, to its eventual recognition as a cult classic. Through a mix of archival footage, behind-the-scenes features, and fan testimonials, Wolfman's Got Nards demonstrates how the film has resonated with audiences over the years, particularly the emotional attachment many fans have developed, often citing how the film influenced their childhoods and shaped their love for the horror genre.

== Background ==
Andre Gower, who starred as Sean Crenshaw in the original The Monster Squad film, directed and produced the documentary. It examines the impact of The Monster Squad on fans, cast, crew, and the film industry in the decades following its initial release.

== Production ==
The documentary was primarily shot during the 30th anniversary revival tour of The Monster Squad. It premiered on 7 April 2018 at the Chattanooga Film Festival and was also selected for the 2018 Sitges International Fantastic Film Festival. In October 2019, the film was screened at 20 Alamo Drafthouse locations as part of a promotional tour.

== Reception ==
Wolfman's Got Nards received positive reviews from critics, with a 100% rating on review aggregator Rotten Tomatoes.
