= Peter Dinwiddie =

American basketball executive

- Born: Indianapolis, Indiana, U.S.
- Education: Indiana University; New England Law Boston
- Occupation: Executive vice president of basketball operations
- Employer: Atlanta Hawks
- Term: 2025–present
- Children: 4

Peter Dinwiddie is an American basketball executive who serves as senior vice president of strategy and analytics for the Atlanta Hawks of the National Basketball Association (NBA). He previously served as senior vice president of basketball operations of the Indiana Pacers, and as executive vice president of basketball operations for the Philadelphia 76ers.

== Executive career ==
=== Indiana Pacers (2006–2020) ===
In 2006, Dinwiddie was hired by the Indiana Pacers for a position in the sales department. In 2007, he was promoted to a position in the group sales department, and in 2008, was also appointed to a position in basketball operations. In July 2017, Dinwiddie was promoted to senior vice president of basketball operations. He was named to the Indianapolis Business Journal's Forty Under 40 list in 2017, which is composed of individuals who have achieved success both in their jobs and in the community.

=== Philadelphia 76ers (2020–2025) ===
In October 2020, Dinwiddie joined the Philadelphia 76ers as executive vice president of basketball operations.

=== Atlanta Hawks (2025–present) ===
On June 9, 2025, Dinwiddie was hired as the senior vice president of strategy and analytics for the Atlanta Hawks. On September 8, 2026, Dinwiddie was promoted to executive vice president of basketball operations.

== Personal life ==
A native of Indianapolis, Dinwiddie graduated from Cathedral High School. He graduated from New England Law School in 2004 and has graduated from Indiana University in 1999. Dinwiddie is married to Jessica. They have four children.
