= Genius (company) =

American digital media company

- Company type: Private
- Website type: Media company
- Headquarters: Brooklyn, New York City, U.S.
- Area served: Worldwide
- Owners: MediaLab AI, Inc.
- Founders: Tom Lehman; Ilan Zechory; Mahbod Moghadam
- President: Ilan Zechory (former); Miki Toliver King (former)
- CEO: Tom Lehman (former); Michael Heyward (current)
- Key people: Colby Handy (Product Manager)
- Industry: Entertainment
- Website: genius.com
- Registration: Required for editing, annotating, and transcribing
- Launched: October 20, 2009; 17 years ago (as Rap Genius)
- Written in: Ruby on Rails; React; AngularJS; jQuery

Genius (stylized in all caps) is an American digital media company founded on August 27, 2009, by Tom Lehman, Ilan Zechory, and Mahbod Moghadam. The company's eponymous website serves as a database for song lyrics, news stories, sources, poetry, and documents, in which users can provide annotations and interpretations for.

Originally launched as Rap Genius, with a focus on hip-hop music, the company attracted the attention and support of celebrities, and venture capital enabling further growth. The site expanded in 2014 to cover other forms of media, such as pop, literature, and R&B, and added an annotation-embedded platform. That same year, an iPhone app was released. To reflect these new goals, the site relaunched as Genius in July 2014. An Android version was released in August 2015, and in 2016 and 2017, the company began producing music-focused original video content and hosting live events and concerts.

== History ==
=== Lyric sites before Rap Exegesis (2000s) ===
Prior to Rap Exegesis' creation, there were websites specifically for searching up lyrics, such as AZLyrics or SongMeanings. Some were meant for specific genres, while others included guitar tabs or MIDI (as in karaoke). Few lyric sites of the time actually embedded songs meant to be transcribed, and even fewer had annotations to explain subtleties like samples, interpolations, references to other lyrics, wordplay, double entendres or rhyme schemes.

Genius first started as a crowdsourced hip-hop focused lyric site, and was originally named Rap Exegesis. The site changed its name to Rap Genius in December 2009 because exegesis was difficult for users to spell.

=== Founding and early years (2009–2012) ===
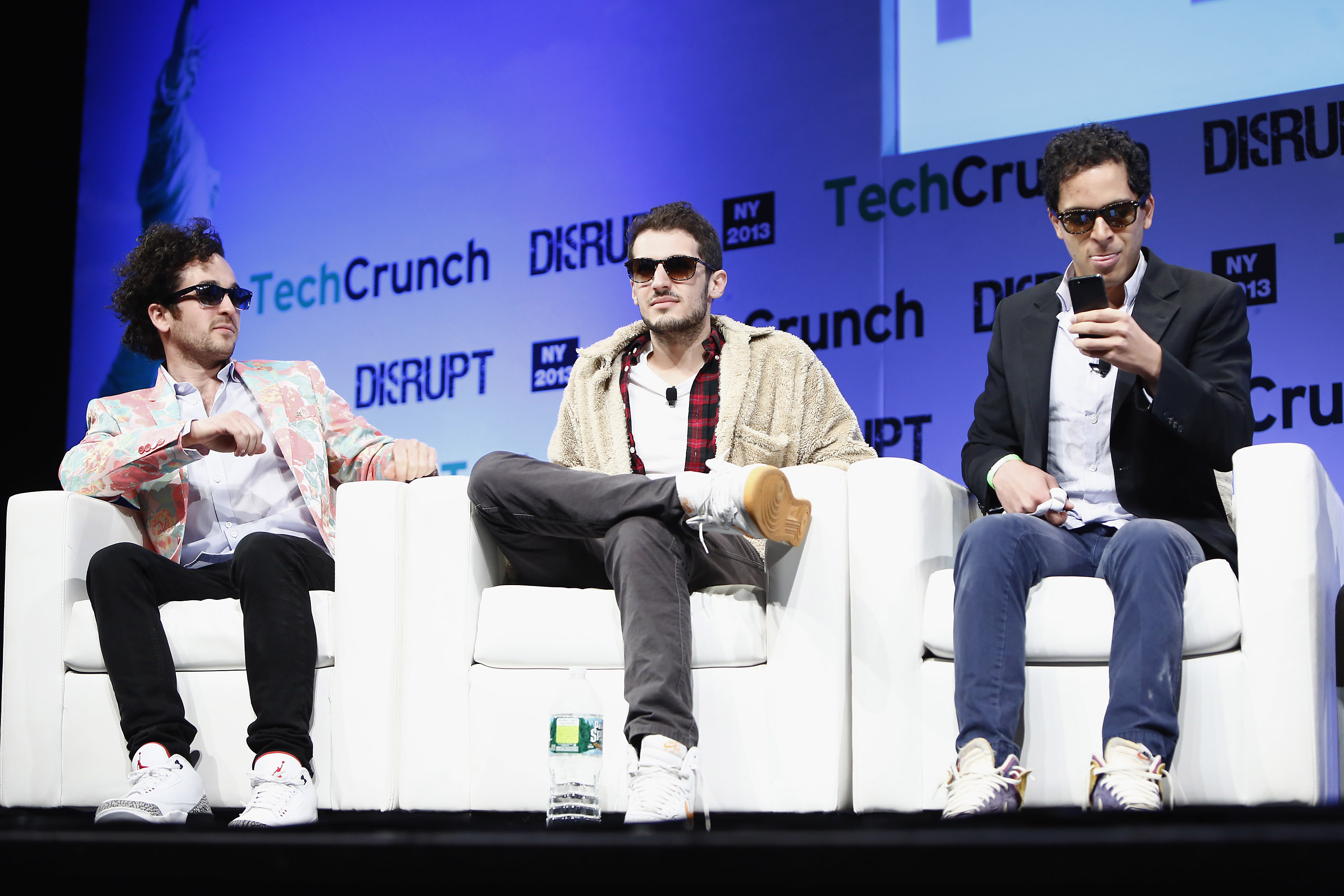
Tom Lehman, Ilan Zechory and Mahbod Moghadam of Rap Genius speak onstage at TechCrunch Disrupt New York 2013.

Genius was created in August 2009 by founders Tom Lehman (who "entered the first line of code" for the website at 12:30 p.m. on August 19, 2009), Ilan Zechory, and Mahbod Moghadam, the three of whom met during their undergraduate years at Yale University. Lehman and Moghadam came up with the idea for the site in the summer of 2009 when Lehman asked Moghadam about the meaning of a Cam'ron lyric. After Lehman built the earliest version of the site, he—along with cofounders Moghadam and Zechory—decided to leave their jobs at D.E. Shaw and Google to pursue the idea full-time and bring it to fruition.

==== Initial funding ====
In 2011, with the site "drawing over 1 million unique visitors per month", Rap Genius applied to start-up incubator Y Combinator, and "became the fastest-growing start-up in Y Combinator history", obtaining $1.8 million in seed funding, which enabled the founders to occupy offices in Williamsburg, Brooklyn. In 2012, the company received an additional $15 million investment from Silicon Valley–based venture capital firm Andreessen Horowitz (also known as a16z), prompted in part by partner Marc Andreessen's own past effort to build a group annotation feature into a web browser. Ben Horowitz described Genius as "one of the most important things we've ever funded". The company's three co-founders were named to the Forbes 30 Under 30 in December 2012.

==== Establishment of verified accounts ====
The popular success of the venture was exemplified by the participation of artists like Queensbridge rapper Nas, 50 Cent, RZA, and A$AP Rocky, prompting the company to create a "Verified Artists" designation. Verified accounts are offered to established artists, where they annotate, moderate, and edit their own lyrics. Such annotations are highlighted in yellow, rather than the usual gray. Nas became the first verified artist, using the platform to post numerous explanations of his lyrics and dispel some misinterpretations, as well as to comment on the lyrics of other rappers he admired. As part of his support for the website, Nas "released the lyrics to his new single 'The Don' on Rap Genius the day before putting out the song itself".

Masta Killa, Inspectah Deck, RZA, GZA, Ghostface Killah and Raekwon, members of the American hip hop group Wu-Tang Clan, also obtained verified accounts on Genius. In late 2012, novelist Bacchus Paine became the first current release prose author to voluntarily annotate part of her own work.

=== Early controversies (2013–2014) ===
In an effort to extend the concept into other genres of culture, Genius launched several new channels in 2013 including Rock Genius and Poetry Genius. The service also added the ability for outside publishers to integrate Rap Genius's platform into other websites to create annotated articles. However, the company also experienced some issues familiar to the online content field.

==== Music publishing dispute ====
In October 2013, Rap Genius was one of fifty sites targeted with notices by the National Music Publishers Association for the unlicensed online publication of song lyrics. Unlike Genius, most of the sites that were targeted were ad-supported. In response, Zechory stated that they "can't wait to have a conversation with them about how all writers can participate in and benefit from the Rap Genius knowledge project". In 2014, Rap Genius entered into a licensing agreement with music publishers covering both past and future publishing of music lyrics.

==== Google search penalty ====
In December 2013, Google penalized Rap Genius for violating their backlinks guidelines—particularly their involvement with blog networks—by removing them from its top search results. Even with the search query "rap genius", results from rapgenius.com did not appear in the top results. Instead, the top results showed Rap Genius' Twitter, Facebook, and Wikipedia pages, as well as news related to the penalty. This happened after blogger and Rap Genius contributor John Marbach exposed its link scheme to manipulate Google search results by offering Tweets or Facebook shares in exchange for linking to Rap Genius with keyword rich texts. Rap Genius posted an apology, promising to stop and reverse the practice. Rap Genius also pointed out that its competitors were participating in similar or worse practices, and asked Google to look at "the whole lyrics search landscape" and improve its lyric search results.

Ten days later, after removing links in violation of Google's Quality Guidelines, Rap Genius partially recovered from their penalty.

==== Resignation of Mahbod Moghadam ====
Fast Company featured Rap Genius co-founder Mahbod Moghadam in its list of the Most Creative People of 2013. By early 2014, however, Moghadam had reduced his involvement in Genius to a part-time role, due to complications from his surgery for meningioma, a benign brain tumor. In May 2014, Moghadam resigned after annotating the manifesto of Isla Vista spree killer Elliot Rodger in ways labeled as inappropriate. Moghadam died in March 2024 due to complications from a brain tumor.

=== Expansion and rebranding (2014–2015) ===
==== New apps and features ====
The company rebounded with the release of an iOS app on January 28, 2014, also called "Genius". Genius co-founder Tom Lehman said at launch: "This is the true launch of Rap Genius. Right now, more than half of our traffic comes from mobile devices. Soon, it will be 100%".

In March 2014, Genius launched a feature allowing users to "embed" annotated texts on other websites. Felix Salmon of Reuters was a noted early user, using the platform to create an annotated breakdown of Janet Yellen's first FOMC statement. Nas embedded the entire annotated Illmatic album onto his website to promote the release of Illmatic XX.

==== Relaunch as "Genius" and expanded funding ====
On July 12, 2014, reflecting its recent expansions and growth into a platform, Rap Genius relaunched as Genius. The co-founders said that the change was because most internet users fail to "dive into" stories they find in greater detail, and that Genius aimed to "help us all realize the richness and depth in every line of text". The company also raised an additional $40 million in series B funding led by investor Dan Gilbert, chairman of Quicken Loans and owner of the Cleveland Cavaliers. With its operations expanding, Genius relocated from Williamsburg, Brooklyn to Gowanus, Brooklyn. Genius also obtained buy-in from artists, including investments by Eminem, Nas, and Pharrell Williams.

At one point, rapper Kanye West, a fan of the site, submitted a mockup of a redesign to investor Ben Horowitz. Although Lehman was impressed, telling Business Insider that future redesigns could use elements from it, the redesign was not used. In mid-2015, along with its redesigned logo and webpage, Genius released its Android app, which initially allowed users to search for and vote on annotations.

==== Staff expansion and new partnerships ====
Hip-hop journalist Rob Markman was hired by Genius as its manager of artist relations. In September 2015, Genius partnered with The Washington Post to annotate the various presidential debates being held at that time. The following month, Genius announced the hiring of Brendan Frederick, formerly of Complex, as director of content.

In 2015, Rick Rubin, A-Trak, The-Dream and Eminem were among those who created verified accounts. Pulitzer Prize winning author Michael Chabon has also been verified and has contributed several annotations. Composer and Lyricist Lin-Manuel Miranda also has a verified account with which he frequently joined discussions on the lyrics from his musicals In the Heights and Hamilton.

==== News Genius ====
News Genius is a web annotation platform which was launched in late 2015 or early 2016. In January 2016, the White House began using Genius to provide annotations for its online postings of President Barack Obama's State of the Union addresses. The News Genius platform was controversial because it allowed annotations to be added to websites, including personal websites, without the webmaster's consent and without an option to opt out of having annotations.

As of 2023, the News Genius website is still up but has not been updated since 2016; it is no longer possible to log in and leave new annotations.

=== Launching content (2016–2021) ===
Genius began offering original content in 2016, beginning with a "Behind the Lyrics" integration offered in collaboration with Spotify that "pairs pop-up annotations with select tracks from the streaming service as well as exclusive artist content", launching with content from Pusha T, Tinashe, and Diplo. Initially available only on iOS, "Behind the Lyrics" became available on Android in April 2017. In November 2019, Spotify ended its partnership with Genius and started using Musixmatch for lyrics instead. Genius announced a partnership with Apple Music where Apple Music subscribers could play songs in full right from the site. In addition, Genius would provide lyrics for the main Apple Music service. On February 4, 2020, Apple Music and Genius announced an expanded partnership, most visibly premiering flagship content series "Verified" on Apple Music early, with Apple Music joining as co-producers on the show. The deal is viewed as part of a larger initiative by Apple to bring exclusive content to its platform amid competition from other digital streaming platforms like Spotify, YouTube, and Amazon Music.

Genius began planning for the creation of original video content, and in June 2016 announced the hiring of Regina Dellea, previously of Mic, as head of video. Planned shows that Dellea was hired to oversee included "Genius Level, an Inside the Actors Studio-style interview series hosted by Rob Markman". In 2016, Genius launched the video series "Verified", "featuring artists like Mac Miller, Ice Cube, and Common decoding their songs on camera", and has since launched various other series, including "Deconstructed" (in which producers dissect the tracks they created) and "IRL", a career-spanning interview series initiated with DJ Khaled as the first subject. In September 2016, Genius announced the addition of Steve Stoute, founder and CEO of the brand development and marketing firm Translation, to its board of directors. In 2017, Genius collaborated with Logic to produce an episode of "Verified" for every song on his album. Logic had previously name-dropped Genius in his song "Slave II", from the 2016 album Bobby Tarantino, with the line "I'm a Rap Genius like Rob Markman".

It also received an additional $15 million in funding in 2018, bringing its total funding to $79 million since 2009. In June 2019, Genius accused Google of lifting lyrics from Genius.com without permission and publishing the lyrics directly in search pages on Google. This resulted in a drop of traffic to Genius.com. In December 2019, this accusation escalated to a lawsuit filed in New York, seeking $50 million in combined minimum damages from Google and LyricFind, a Canadian Company that provides licensed lyrics to companies including Google, Amazon and Microsoft. Judge Margo Brodie dismissed the lawsuit in August 2020, finding that Genius' lyric transcriptions were derivative works of the transcribed songs, meaning that Genius did not hold the copyright to the lyrics and could not claim Google's display of them as a copyright violation. The dismissal was upheld in March 2022 upon appeal.

==== Live events ====
Genius began hosting live events at their Brooklyn headquarters in 2017. On April 26, 2017, Genius hosted a listening party with rapper Wale for the release of Wale's album, SHiNE. The first Genius Level live interview was in May 2017, with The-Dream. On September 7, 2017, Rob Markman interviewed Issa Rae before a live audience. Genius held its first live concert event on September 9, 2017, with the IQ/BBQ festival at the Genius headquarters. The event featured performances by artists including Pusha T, Dej Loaf, A Boogie wit da Hoodie, and was produced in partnership with Adidas and Atari.

Genius held a live event with Dropbox in 2018 called "Lyrics to Life," a four-day art exhibition featuring art installations inspired by music.

During the COVID-19 pandemic, Genius pivoted part of its original content strategy to focus on a livestream approach, most notably with a new series, "Genius Live", hosted directly on the site. Its intent is to be a new platform focusing on facilitating artist to fan interactions and providing direct monetization opportunities. Features that went live with launch allowed fans to vote directly on the set list, request shoutouts from the artist, join the Watch Party for a chance to be featured on stream, do a virtual meet and greet, and contribute to collective rewards such as unlocking an unreleased song. Custom merchandise created specifically for the Genius Live show also goes on sale with the performance. Artists that have been booked by the Artist Relations team since launch include Vory, Mariah the Scientist, Wiz Khalifa, Ty Dolla $ign, and The Kid Laroi.

Genius also pivoted another original content series, The Co-Sign, from YouTube to Twitch during the pandemic. Up and coming artists from around the world are given a chance to compete every Friday for coverage by the platform, most notably in the "Genius Freestyles" series spearheaded by the social team.

==== Merchandise ====
Genius began selling branded merchandise in mid-2016, and engaged in "a T-shirt collaboration with rapper Pusha T's Play Cloths line for Art Basel" in December 2016. In 2017, Genius expanded its merchandise offerings with the launch of its "1997" collection, with a set of styles and themes inspired by cultural events of 1997.

=== Acquisition by MediaLab (Since 2021) ===
Genius Media was acquired by the holding company MediaLab in September 2021 for $80 million. Genius entered into agreement with MediaLab, who also own other viral websites and applications like Kik and Datpiff, to sell the website as it was "the ideal partner to propel Genius forward". Immediately after the acquisition, Bloomberg announced Genius was now laying off staff, though no official numbers were released. This was due to a "restructure" from MediaLab to shift the website's focus towards emerging artists.

In 2024, the song "Euphoria" by Kendrick Lamar crashed the Genius website, a rare case in which a single song rather than an album caused such an occurrence.

== Features ==
Works and articles on Genius are annotated by community members with various lines highlighted in gray; by clicking on these lines, pop-up "tates" are displayed, which provide additional details and context for the lyrics in question. Users can provide their own annotations by highlighting fragments of text. The site formerly offered the "Rap Map", a Google Maps display featuring profiles and placemarks for geographical locations related to rap culture or mentioned in rap songs. In 2021, a similar feature was launched in a branded campaign via collaboration with French cognac firm Rémy Martin titled Collective Sounds. Landmarks culturally important to the musical communities of the cities of Los Angeles, Chicago, New York City, and Atlanta were spotlighted by the lyrics and pop culture moments that made them iconic. Artists 6lack, Mick Jenkins, Reason, and Meechy Darko also delivered personal accounts of what these places meant to them.

Contributors to Genius receive points, "IQ", for interactions on each song page. The IQ system employs both direct points—for example, a 5 IQ point increase for an annotation—and a voting system. Especially insightful and popular annotations gain positive reviews, increasing the IQ value of an annotation. Popular song pages also reward IQ to the transcriber as they reach certain view count milestones. IQ serves as measure of a community member's impact and work on the site. Editors and Moderators gain additional means of obtaining IQ as a reward for quality assurance work on the site.

Registered users with 600 IQ unlock most features of the "contributor" role and can upload, edit, and annotate texts. They can also offer suggestions to improve already published texts and annotations. Transcribers, Editors, Moderators, and Mediators, volunteers who are given the role by peer vote within the Genius community, help to generate and monitor content to ensure quality writing. Users can earn IQ with most interactions within the site, such as annotations, song transcription, votes, song page views, and also competitions/projects initiated by the Genius community and/or community staff.

=== Spotify ===
In 2016, Spotify began a partnership with Genius on their "Behind the Lyrics" feature, which displayed lyrics and content from Genius for selected tracks, allowing users to "watch annotated lyrics for songs as you listen to them". Initially, bringing up the album art while playing a track revealed a black tab behind the art reading "Behind the Lyrics", which gave users access to the feature. Later the feature was placed under the song player itself, where users could scroll up to reveal the full content piece.

In 2021, Spotify's "Behind the Lyrics" feature was discontinued worldwide, and replaced with a new real-time lyrics feature, powered by Musixmatch. The new feature had been tested since 2019 and was rolled out in 26 of Spotify's markets in 2020.

However, in September 2026, Genius and Spotify would partner again by delivering Genius' "Open Mic" and "Verified" media to Spotify, meaning that these series are now offered on Genius, YouTube, Apple Music, and Spotify.

== Key people ==
As of 2021, key staff members and advisors to Genius include co-founders Tom Lehman and Ilan Zechory (resigned as president in 2021), additional board members and investors Marc Andreessen, Ben Horowitz, Dan Gilbert, and Steve Stoute; Chief Content Officer Brendan Frederick, VP of Content Strategy Rob Markman, Chief Strategy Officer Ben Gross, President Miki King, CFO Nakuj Vittal, CTO Andrew Warner, and Site Director Stephen Niday.

On March 11, 2021, Genius named Miki Toliver King, the Washington Post's chief marketing officer, as its new president, replacing co-founder Ilan Zechory. Zechory will remain on the company's board of directors and continue to be involved in strategy. King commented to Variety Magazine, "Never has there been a more important time for the work of artists and creators to reverberate around the world, with Genius as its driving force. I am honored to leverage my career-long commitment to connecting audiences to the content they value most." She joined the company in the second quarter of 2021 and will oversee revenue, content, audience operations, and marketing alongside co-founder and CEO Tom Lehman.

Top artists contributing to Genius include Lorde, Frank Ocean, Jaden Smith, Lin-Manuel Miranda, Selena Gomez, Phoebe Ryan, DJ Khaled, Nas, Eminem, Rivers Cuomo, Rick Rubin, and Lupe Fiasco with the latter being the reason why Rap Genius was established.
