= Jesser =

American YouTuber (born 1999)

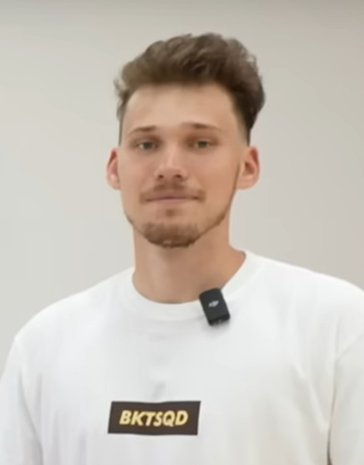
- Riedel in 2025
- Born: Jesse Riedel; March 27, 1999 (age 27); Westlake Village, California, US
- Education: Westlake High School

YouTube information
- Channels: Jesser; Team Jesser
- Years active: 2013–present
- Genre: Sports/blogging
- Subscribers: 50.4 million (main channel); 5.68 million (Team Jesser); 52.8 million (combined) (Note: Subscribers, broken down by channel: 49.7 million (Jesser) 5.68 million (Team Jesser))
- Views: 13.1 billion (main channel); 1.87 billion (Team Jesser); 14.9 billion (combined) (Note: Views, broken down by channel: 13.1 billion (main channel) 1.87 billion (Team Jesser))
- Last updated: July 12, 2026
- Website: bucketsquad.com

Jesse Riedel (born March 27, 1999), better known as Jesser, is an American YouTuber. He makes videos based primarily around basketball, being one of the largest basketball content creators on the platform. Jesser's videos usually include challenges or meeting professional athletes.

== Early life ==
Jesse Riedel was born on March 27, 1999, in Westlake Village, California. His father, Guy, is a film producer who has worked on films such as Wedding Crashers and Office Space. His brother, James, is also a YouTuber, going by the alias Jiedel. Jesser began making videos in elementary school, filming skits with his brother. In 2013, when he was in middle school, he began to make videos about the video games Minecraft and Counter-Strike: Global Offensive, being inspired by English YouTuber Syndicate.

== Career ==
Jesser was originally known as JesserTheLazer. His first viral video, "NBA 2K14 In Real Life", where he discussed glitches in the NBA 2K series, was uploaded during his freshman year at Westlake High School. Following the continued success of his later videos, Jesser persuaded his parents to let him skip his senior year, and eventually passed the California High School Proficiency Exam. He founded BucketSquad in 2017 as a lifestyle brand and community centered around basketball culture and digital content creation. He launched the brand to engage his growing YouTube audience with apparel and merchandise reflecting his passion for basketball. In 2018, BucketSquad expanded into a merchandise line offering apparel and accessories. BucketSquad has since become a prominent name in online basketball entertainment, resonating with younger audiences and sports enthusiasts. He became sponsored by Ballislife.com in 2018. In 2020, Jesser partnered with Champs Sports and Puma to release his own exclusive version of the Puma Clyde, along with other apparel. He signed with management company Night in 2023 and also participated in that year's NBA All-Star Game. In the same year, he introduced the BucketSquad 1 sneaker in collaboration with SoleSavy and Garrixon Studios. In 2024, Jesser made an appearance on the NBA League Pass, commentating an alternative broadcast. In 2025, he was the representative for the fan vote for that year's Slam Dunk Contest.

== Awards and nominations ==
Year	Award	Category	Result	Ref(s)
2022	Streamy Awards	Sports	Won	
2023	Streamy Awards	Sports	Won	
