= Theodor Forselius =

Swedish computer programmer

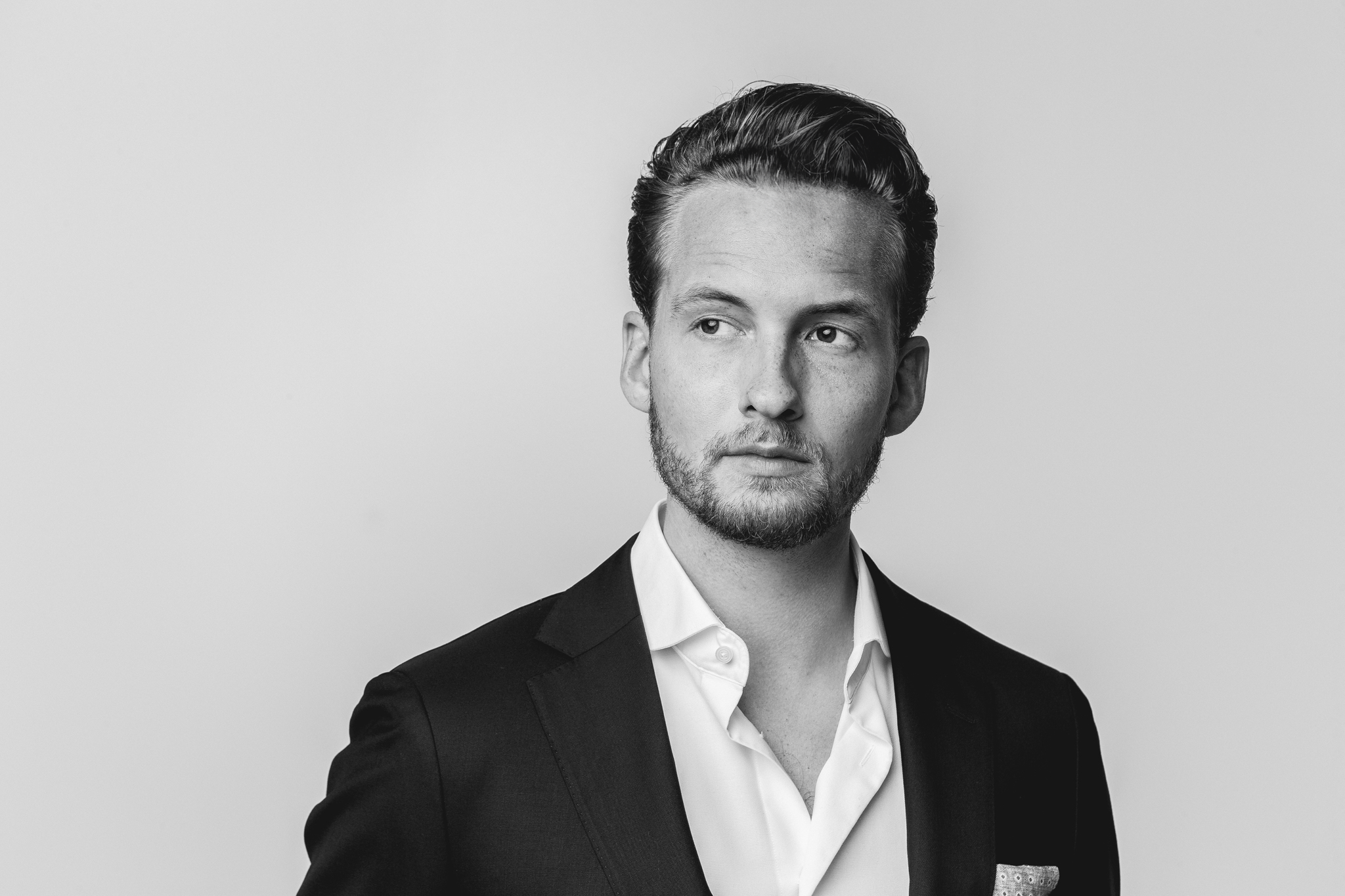
- Theodor Forselius in August 2024
- Born: March 23, 1995 (age 30); Jönköping, Sweden
- Occupation: CEO of Everipedia
- Known for: Co-founding Everipedia

Theodor "Tedde" Mauritz Forselius (born 23 March 1995) is a Swedish computer programmer and internet entrepreneur from Jönköping, Sweden. He is best known as the co-founder and Chief Executive Officer of Everipedia.

== Career ==
In December 2014, Theodor Forselius co-founded Everipedia. They built the first version of the website in Kazemian's college dormitory room at UCLA.

Since then, Forselius and Everipedia have been internationally recognized in publications such as Wired Magazine. He has also been featured on the front pages of local publications in Sweden such as Veckans Affärer and Dagens Industri.
