= List of awards and nominations received by Bob Hope =

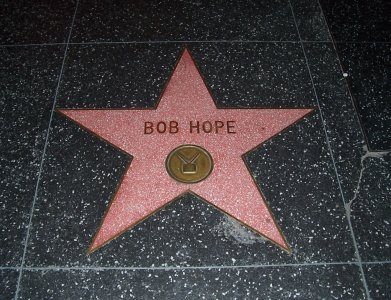
Bob Hope's Star for Television on the Hollywood Walk of Fame

This is a list of awards and prestigious honors received by Bob Hope throughout his career.

== Academy Awards ==
Year	Nominated work	Result
1940	To Bob Hope: "in recognition of his unselfish services to the Motion Picture Industry."	Special Silver Plaque
1944	To Bob Hope: "for his many services to the Academy."	Life Membership in the Academy
1952	To Bob Hope: "for his contribution to the laughter of the world, his service to the motion picture industry, and his devotion to the American premise."	Statuette
1959	Jean Hersholt Humanitarian Award	Statuette
1965	To Bob Hope: "for unique and distinguished service to our industry and the Academy."	Gold Medal

== Honors ==
- Recipient of the Golden Plate Award of the American Academy of Achievement in 1961
- Induction into the National Association of Broadcasters Hall of Fame (for Radio) in 1977
- Recipient of the Kennedy Center Honors in 1985
- Induction into the Television Hall of Fame in 1987
- Induction into the World Golf Hall of Fame in 1983
- Recipient of the Arkansas Traveler
- Induction into Omicron Delta Kappa, the National Leadership Honor Society in 1992

=== Medals ===
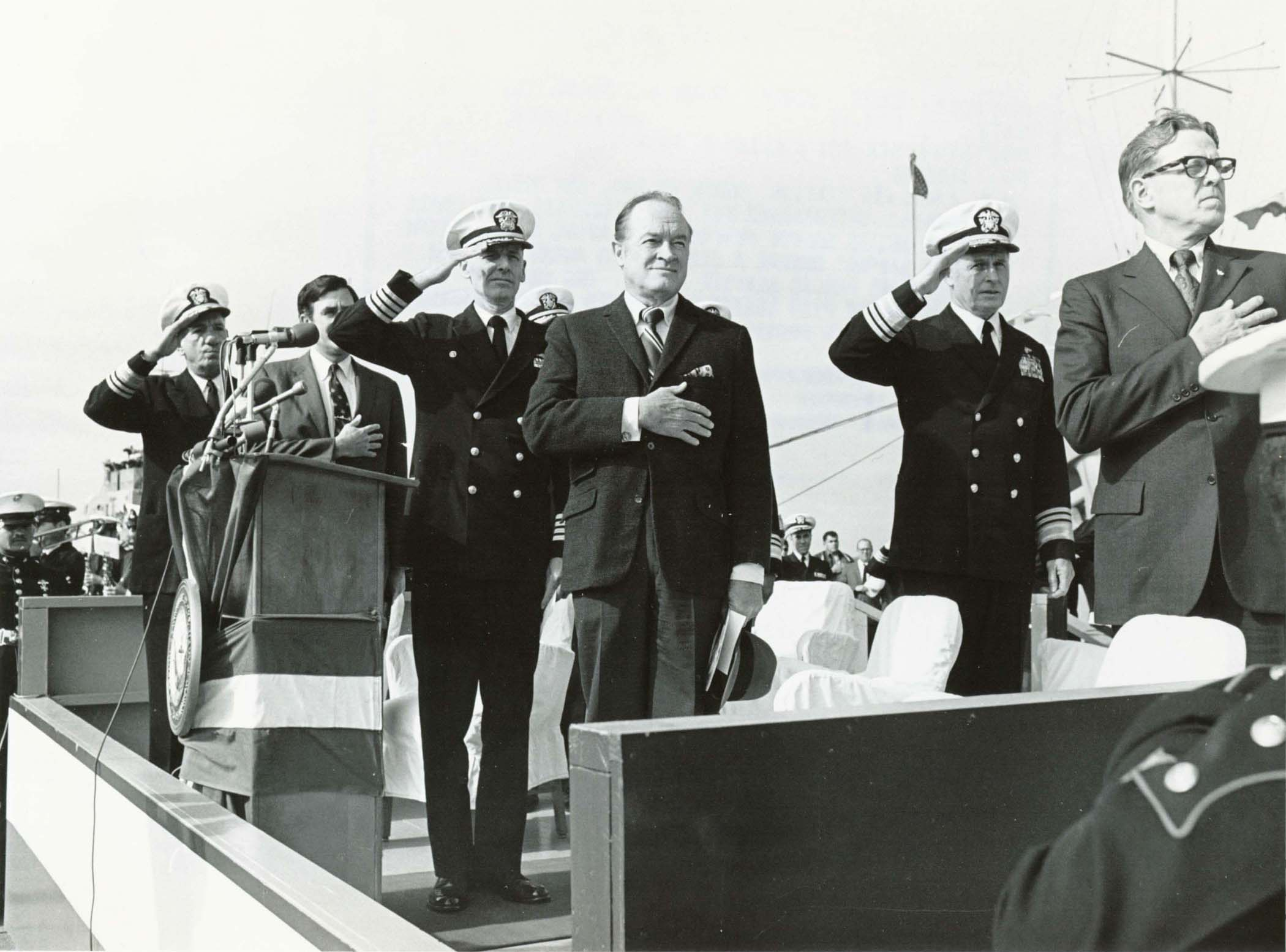
Ceremony to award Hope the Distinguished Public Service Award aboard USS Providence

- Congressional Gold Medal (June 8, 1962)
- Sylvanus Thayer Award, United States Military Academy (at West Point, 1968)
- Presidential Medal of Freedom (awarded by Lyndon B. Johnson, January 20, 1969)
- Medal for Merit (awarded by Gen. Dwight D. Eisenhower, Chief of Staff, at Pentagon October 24, 1946. “Decoration was in recognition of his wartime contributions to morale on the homefront as well as on virtually every war front.”)
- Department of Defense Medal for Distinguished Public Service (at Naval Air Station, North Island, San Diego, Ca., Jan. 31, 1971)
- Medal of Liberty (1986, one of twelve recipients)
- National Medal of Arts (1995)
- Ronald Reagan Freedom Award (1997)
- Spirit of Hope Award (first honorary, 1997)

=== Titles and designations ===
- 1948 World Series Champion (as part owner of the Cleveland Indians).
- Honorary mayor of Palm Springs, California (1950s)
- Hasty Pudding Man of the Year (first awardee, 1967)
- Board of Governors of the National Space Institute, forerunner of the present-day National Space Society, a nonprofit educational space advocacy organization founded by Dr. Wernher von Braun (1974)
- Honorary Veteran of the United States Armed Forces, a tribute from the United States Congress given in recognition of the entertainment he provided U.S. troops during war and peacekeeping missions (October 29, 1997)
- Honorary Knight Commander of the Order of the British Empire (KBE) In recognition of his contributions to film, to song, and to the entertainment of troops in the past. (1998). He had previously been appointed an Honorary Commander of the Order of the British Empire (CBE) in 1976.
- Knighthood, Order of St. Sylvester from the Vatican
- Silver Buffalo Award (highest adult award given by the Boy Scouts of America)
- The Honorable Order of Kentucky Colonels.
- The Grand Order of Water Rats.
- Appointed a Knight Commander with Star of the Order of St. Gregory the Great by Pope John Paul II in 1998
- Hope became the 64th and only civilian recipient of the United States Air Force Order of the Sword on June 10, 1980. The Order of the Sword recognizes individuals who have made significant contributions to the enlisted corps.
- In 1996 Hope was awarded the Naval Heritage Award by the U S Navy Memorial Foundation for his support of the US Navy and military.

=== Memorials and tributes ===
- The PGA Tour's Bob Hope Chrysler Classic, which was an existing tournament (The Desert Classic) renamed in recognition of the comedian's lifelong passion for the game, 1966
- The Lorain-Carnegie Bridge in Cleveland was renamed the Hope Memorial Bridge in 1983 (disputed as to whether it was meant to honor Hope, his stonemason father Harry, or the entire Hope Family)
- America's Tribute to Bob Hope, a 1988 documentary taped at the Palm Desert, California, Bob Hope Cultural Center
- In 1992, a Golden Palm Star on the Palm Springs, California, Walk of Stars was dedicated to him.
- Bob Hope Drive, streets in both Burbank (where there is also an airport named after him) and Rancho Mirage, California. The Rancho Mirage street is the location of Eisenhower Medical Center which Hope and his wife were instrumental in creating.

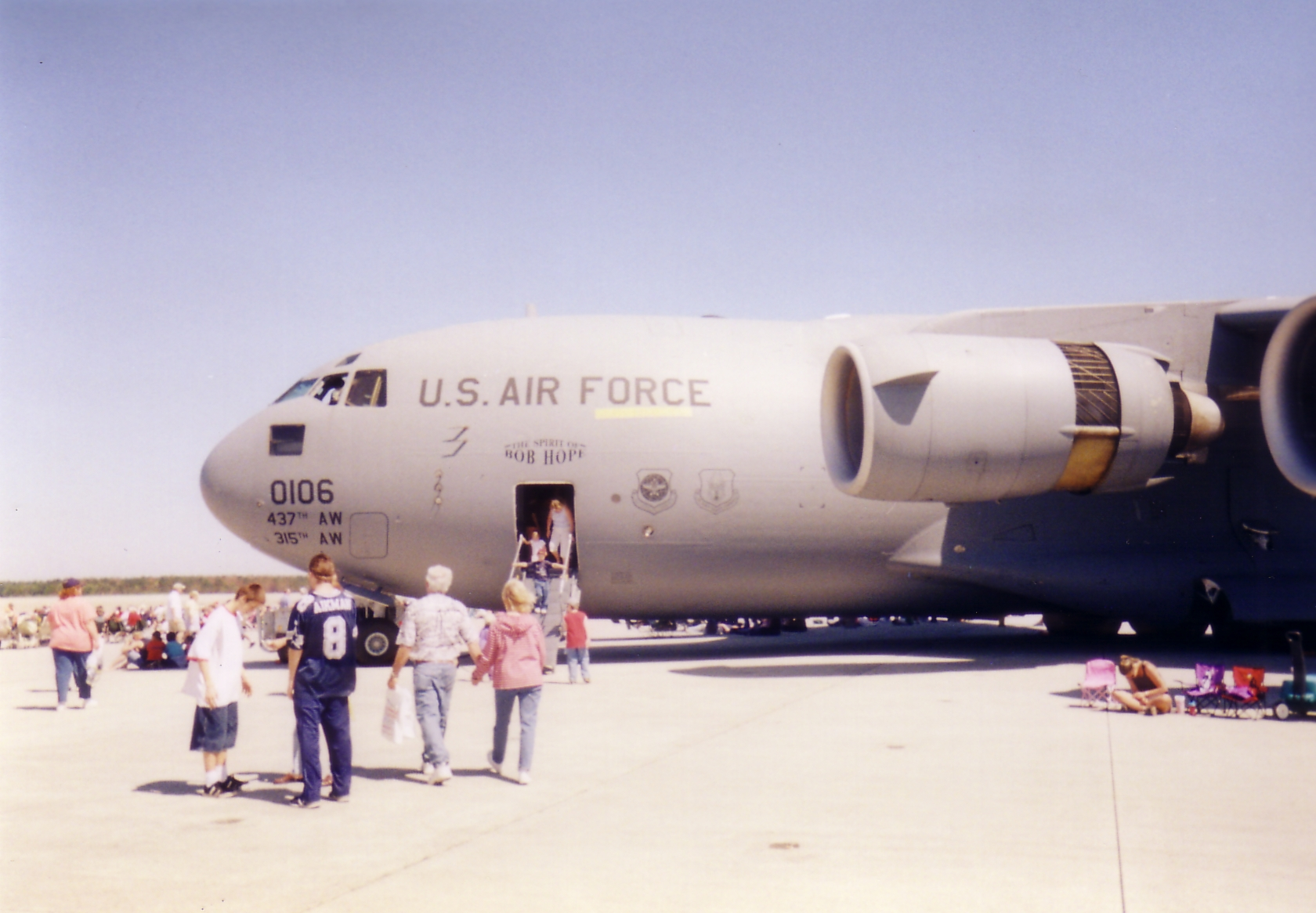
The Spirit of Bob Hope is a USAF C-17 Globemaster III that was named after Hope

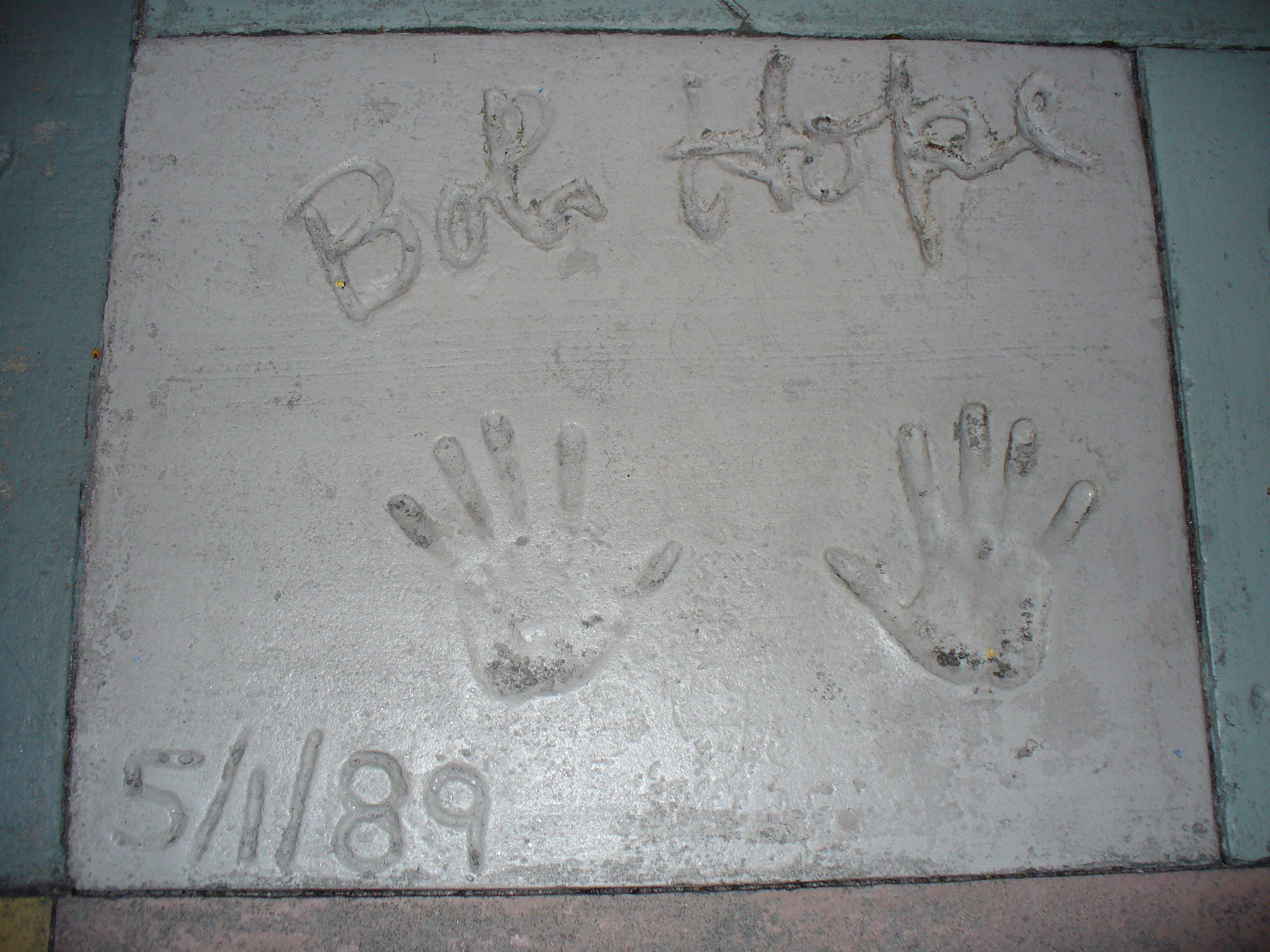
The handprints of Bob Hope in front of The Great Movie Ride at Disney's Hollywood Studios

- The United States Air Force named a C-17 Globemaster III transport aircraft the Spirit of Bob Hope.
- Bob Hope: 50 Years of Hope, an exhibition of Hope's service of entertaining the United States military at the National Museum of the United States Air Force near Dayton, Ohio
- Bob Hope Square (naming of the intersection at Hollywood and Vine in Los Angeles to commemorate Hope's 100th birthday, May 29, 2003)
- Memory Lane-Bob Hope Way (renaming of East 14th Street in Cleveland to commemorate Hope's 100th birthday in 2003)
- Bob Hope Airport: Hope had joked with his family that he wanted an airport named for him after hearing in 1979 that Orange County officials had renamed their airport after John Wayne. On November 3, 2003 the Burbank-Glendale-Pasadena Airport Authority voted unanimously to rename the facility and on November 18, 2003 the Glendale, and Burbank city councils voted unanimously to approve it. Pasadena followed on December 10. The FAA three-letter designation BUR did not change. A rededication ceremony took place on December 17, the 100th anniversary of the Wright brothers' first powered flight.
- The historic Fox Theater in downtown Stockton, California, was renamed the Bob Hope Theater in his honor. The building is listed on the National Register of Historic Places.
- USNS Bob Hope (T-AKR-300) of the U.S. Military Sealift Command was named after the performer in 1997. It is one of very few U.S. naval ships that were named after living people.
- Asteroid 2829 Bobhope
- The Bob Hope Theatre, an amateur theatre (although professional musicians receive payment) in Eltham, London, where he was born. He personally funded the theatre in 1980 to develop further projects for the venue.
- Blue plaque at 44, Craigton Road Eltham, London, Hope's place of birth.
- The Bob Hope Theatre, an on-base movie theatre and lecture hall at Marine Corps Air Station Miramar, San Diego, California.
- Hope had a long and close association with Southern Methodist University in Dallas. His donations of over $800,000 enabled the opening of the Bob Hope Theatre in the Owen Fine Arts Center of the Meadows School of the Arts, and two theater scholarships and an award are named in his honor.
- "The Bob Hope Chow Hall", the dining facility at Camp Lemonnier, Djibouti, Africa.
- Bob Hope Primary School, a primary school located on Kadena US Air Force Base, in Okinawa, Japan.
- The historic Bob Hope Patriotic Hall building on Figueroa Street in Los Angeles County was named in his honor on August 3, 2003, by the Los Angeles County Board of Supervisors.
- In a bill passed by Congress in 2008, the research library at the Ellis Island Immigration Museum was renamed the Bob Hope Memorial Library.
- At the U.S. Naval Academy, Alumni Hall is home to the Bob Hope Performing Arts Center.
- In 2009 "A National Salute to Bob Hope and the Military" was dedicated in San Diego, California.

=== Stars on the Hollywood Walk of Fame ===
- For contributions to the live theater, radio, motion picture, and television, Hope was honored with four stars on the Hollywood Walk of Fame.
- Motion picture star at 6541 Hollywood Blvd.
- Radio star at 6141 Hollywood Blvd.
- TV star at 6758 Hollywood Blvd.
- Live theatre special plaque at 7021 Hollywood Blvd.

=== Golden Globe Awards ===
- Special Achievement Award 1958 "For an Ambassador of Good Will."
- Cecil B. DeMille Award 1963

=== Honorary Degrees ===
Hope received more than 50 honorary degrees. These include:

Country	Date	School	Degree
Illinois	8 June 1958	Quincy University	Doctor of Letters (D.Litt.)
District of Columbia	4 June 1962	Georgetown University	Doctor of Humane Letters (DHL)
Wyoming	1 June 1964	University of Wyoming	Doctor of Laws (LL.D.)
New Jersey	5 June 1965	Monmouth College	Doctor of Humane Letters (DHL)
California	12 June 1965	Whittier College	Doctor of Humane Letters (DHL)
Pennsylvania	29 January 1966	Pennsylvania Military College	Doctor of Humane Letters (DHL)
Illinois	11 June 1966	Northwestern University	Doctor of Laws (LL.D.)
Texas	3 April 1967	Southern Methodist University	Doctor of Humane Letters (DHL)
Rhode Island	3 June 1968	Brown University	Doctor of Fine Arts (DFA)
Ohio	1 September 1968	Ohio Dominican University	Doctor of Humane Letters (DHL)
Ohio	27 April 1969	Miami University	Doctor of Humane Letters (DHL)
Ohio	7 June 1969	Ohio State University	Doctor of Humane Letters (DHL)
Ohio	14 June 1969	Bowling Green State University	Doctor of Humane Letters (DHL)
Ohio	22 April 1970	University of Cincinnati	Doctor of Humane Letters (DHL)
Vermont	7 June 1970	Saint Michael's College	Doctor of Humane Letters (DHL)
New York	8 June 1970	Pace College	Doctor of Laws (LL.D.)
Nevada	11 June 1970	UNLV	Doctor of Humane Letters (DHL)
Tennessee	25 May 1971	Bethel College	Doctor of Humane Letters (DHL)
New York	30 May 1971	St. Bonaventure University	Doctor of Laws (LL.D.)
California	12 June 1971	Santa Clara University	Doctor of Humane Letters (DHL)
Florida	6 April 1972	Jacksonville University	Doctor of Fine Arts (DFA)
Ohio	1 June 1972	Wilberforce University	Doctor of Humane Letters (DHL)
California	12 April 1973	Pepperdine University	Doctor of Laws (LL.D.)
Missouri	27 May 1973	Drury College	Doctor of Humane Service
West Virginia	10 May 1974	Salem College	Doctor of International Relations
Indiana	12 May 1974	Indiana University	Doctor of Humane Letters (DHL)
Florida	19 February 1975	Florida Southern College	Doctor of Humane Letters (DHL)
Michigan	18 May 1975	Northwood Institute	Doctor of Humane Letters (DHL)
Vermont	24 May 1975	Norwich University	Doctor of Humane Letters (DHL)
Pennsylvania	1 June 1975	University of Scranton	Doctor of Laws (LL.D.)
Utah	5 June 1975	Utah State University	Doctor of Humane Letters (DHL)
New York	28 April 1976	Mercy College	Doctor of Humane Letters (DHL)
Iowa	9 May 1976	St. Ambrose College	Doctor of Public Service
Ohio	30 May 1976	John Carroll University	Doctor of Humane Letters (DHL)
South Dakota	24 September 1976	Dakota Wesleyan University	Doctor of Performing Arts
New Hampshire	15 May 1977	Saint Anselm College	Doctor of Humane Letters (DHL)
California	4 June 1977	Western State University College of Law	Doctor of Laws (LL.D.)
Ohio	12 June 1977	Baldwin–Wallace College	Doctor of Humane Letters (DHL)
California	17 June 1977	College of the Desert	Doctor of Humane Letters (DHL)
Washington	14 May 1978	Gonzaga University	Doctor of Letters (D.Litt.)
Ohio	21 May 1978	Capital University	Doctor of Humane Letters (DHL)
Missouri	12 May 1979	Saint Louis University	Doctor of Humane Letters (DHL)
Massachusetts	3 June 1979	Central New England College of Technology	Doctor of Oratorical Science
Oklahoma	1 May 1983	Oral Roberts University	Doctor of Humane Letters (DHL)
California	26 January 1984	Pepperdine University	Doctor of philanthropy
New York	30 March 1984	Columbia University	Doctor of Humane Letters (DHL)
West Virginia	6 May 1984	University of Charleston	Doctor of Humane Letters (DHL)
South Carolina	12 May 1984	The Citadel	Doctor of Humane Letters (DHL)
Missouri	18 May 1984	Washington University	Doctor of Humane Letters (DHL)
Florida	26 April 1986	Embry–Riddle Aeronautical University	Doctor of Aviation Management
Georgia (U.S. state)	14 June 1986	Life Chiropractic College	Doctor of Chiropractic Humanities
Maryland	16 May 1987	Loyola College	Doctor of Humane Letters (DHL)
California	27 May 1990	University of San Diego	Doctor of Humane Letters (DHL)
Pennsylvania	13 October 1990	Gettysburg College	Doctor of Public Service
Rhode Island	17 May 1992	University of Rhode Island	Doctor of Humane Letters (DHL)

=== Polls ===
- In a 2005 poll to find "The Comedian's Comedian", he was voted amongst the top 50 comedy acts ever by fellow comedians and comedy insiders.
- In 1996 TV Guide ranked Hope number 25 on its "50 Greatest TV Stars of All Time" list.

== Sources ==
- Blake, Allison (2010). Explorer's Guide Baltimore, Annapolis & The Chesapeake Bay: A Great Destination. Explorer's Guides. Woodstock, VT: Countryman Press. ISBN 978-1-58157-112-7.
- Grudens, Richard (2002). The Spirit of Bob Hope: One Hundred Years, One Million Laughs. Sioux Falls, SD: Pine Hill Press. ISBN 978-1-57579-227-9.
- TV Guide Book of Lists. Philadelphia, PA: Running Press. 2007. ISBN 978-0-7624-3007-9.

Preceded by Bob Burns; 10th Academy Awards	Oscars host 12th Academy Awards	Succeeded by Walter Wanger; 13th Academy Awards
Preceded by Walter Wanger; 13th Academy Awards	Oscars host 14th and 15th Academy Awards	Succeeded by Jack Benny; 16th Academy Awards
Preceded by Jack Benny; 16th Academy Awards	Oscars host 17th (with John Cromwell) and 18th Academy Awards (with James Stewart)	Succeeded by Jack Benny; 19th Academy Awards
Preceded by Danny Kaye; 24th Academy Awards	Oscars host 25th Academy Awards (with Conrad Nagel)	Succeeded by Fredric March and Donald O'Connor; 26th Academy Awards
Preceded by Fredric March and Donald O'Connor; 26th Academy Awards	Oscars host 27th Academy Awards (with Thelma Ritter)	Succeeded by Claudette Colbert, Jerry Lewis, and Joseph L. Mankiewicz; 28th Academy Awards
Preceded by Jerry Lewis; 29th Academy Awards	Oscars host 30th (with Jack Lemmon, David Niven, Rosalind Russell, and James Stewart), 31st (with Jerry Lewis, David Niven, Laurence Olivier, Tony Randall, and Mort Sahl), 32nd, 33rd, and 34th Academy Awards	Succeeded by Frank Sinatra; 35th Academy Awards
Preceded by Jack Lemmon; 36th Academy Awards	Oscars host 37th, 38th, 39th, and 40th Academy Awards	Succeeded by Sammy Davis, Jr., Helen Hayes, Alan King, and Jack Lemmon; 44th Academy Awards
Preceded by John Huston, David Niven, Burt Reynolds, and Diana Ross; 46th Academy Awards	Oscars host 47th Academy Awards (with Sammy Davis, Jr., Shirley MacLaine, and Frank Sinatra)	Succeeded by Goldie Hawn, Gene Kelly, Walter Matthau, George Segal, and Robert Shaw; 48th Academy Awards
Preceded by Warren Beatty, Ellen Burstyn, Jane Fonda, and Richard Pryor; 49th Academy Awards	Oscars host 50th Academy Awards	Succeeded by Johnny Carson; 51st Academy Awards
Awards
Preceded by Francis Spellman	Sylvanus Thayer Award recipient 1968	Succeeded by Dean Rusk
Preceded by Samuel Goldwyn	Jean Hersholt Humanitarian Award; 1959	Succeeded by Sol Lesser
Preceded by King Hussein I	Recipient of The Ronald Reagan Freedom Award; 1997	Succeeded by Margaret Thatcher
