= Governors Awards =

Annual lifetime achievement award ceremony in film

- Awarded for: Lifetime achievement in film
- Country: United States
- Presented by: Academy of Motion Picture Arts and Sciences
- First award: 2009–present
- Website: Official website

The Governors Awards presentation is an annual award ceremony hosted by the Academy of Motion Picture Arts and Sciences (AMPAS). Three awards that honor lifetime achievement within the film industry, the Academy Honorary Award, the Jean Hersholt Humanitarian Award, and the Irving G. Thalberg Memorial Award, are presented at this ceremony. The first Governors Awards ceremony was held on November 14, 2009. These three awards were formerly presented during the main Academy Awards ceremony before the Governors Awards ceremony's inception.

== Description and history ==
The Governors Awards present the Academy Honorary Award (every year), Jean Hersholt Humanitarian Award (some years), and Irving G. Thalberg Memorial Award (some years) at the ceremony. The Governors Awards are held as the first major event leading up to the main Academy Awards ceremony. The awards are conferred by the Academy's Board of Governors, and not voted by Academy members, as these awards are non-competitive.

The Academy Honorary Awards and Jean Hersholt Humanitarian Awards are both Oscar statuettes, while recipients of the Irving G. Thalberg Memorial Award were formerly given a small bust of Thalberg on a plinth, but was charged to an Oscar statuette in 2024.

The Academy Honorary Award is given for "extraordinary distinction in lifetime achievement, exceptional contributions to the state of motion picture arts and sciences, or for outstanding service to the Academy". The Thalberg Award is given to "a creative producer whose body of work reflects a consistently high quality of motion picture production".

The board members of AMPAS had previously been concerned about awarding more than one or two Honorary Academy Awards each year for fear of lengthening the main Academy Awards presentation but, in most iterations of the Governors Awards to date, they have awarded two or three Honorary Academy Awards. In the history of the Governors Awards, the Hersholt Award and the Thalberg Award has typically been given in separate years.

The smaller presentation of the Governors Awards was designed to invoke the feel of the early Academy Award ceremonies. During the event, several notable colleagues of the recipients give them tributes before they make an acceptance speech. The event is non-televised, but the Academy posts most of the speeches online.

Since its inception, the event has become a major red carpet stop for many prospective Oscar hopefuls, including actors and filmmakers, and is, in some ways, the first major event of the film awards season.

== Ceremonies and honorees ==
=== 1st Annual Governors Awards ===
The Academy held its 1st Annual Governors Awards ceremony on November 14, 2009. The following awards were presented.

- Academy Honorary Award: Lauren Bacall, Roger Corman, and Gordon Willis
- Irving G. Thalberg Memorial Award: John Calley (who did not attend the ceremony; director Steven Spielberg accepted on his behalf)

=== 2nd Annual Governors Awards ===
The Academy held its 2nd Annual Governors Awards ceremony on November 13, 2010. The following awards were presented.

- Academy Honorary Award: Kevin Brownlow, Jean-Luc Godard (who did not attend the ceremony; Academy President Tom Sherak accepted on his behalf), and Eli Wallach
- Irving G. Thalberg Memorial Award: Francis Ford Coppola

=== 3rd Annual Governors Awards ===
The Academy held its 3rd Annual Governors Awards ceremony on November 12, 2011. The following awards were presented.

- Academy Honorary Award: James Earl Jones and Dick Smith
- Jean Hersholt Humanitarian Award: Oprah Winfrey

=== 4th Annual Governors Awards ===
The Academy held its 4th Annual Governors Awards ceremony on December 1, 2012. The following awards were presented.

- Academy Honorary Award: D. A. Pennebaker, Hal Needham and George Stevens Jr.
- Jean Hersholt Humanitarian Award: Jeffrey Katzenberg

=== 5th Annual Governors Awards ===
The Academy held its 5th Annual Governors Awards ceremony on November 16, 2013. The following awards were presented.

- Academy Honorary Award: Angela Lansbury, Steve Martin and Piero Tosi (who did not attend the ceremony; actress Claudia Cardinale accepted on his behalf)
- Jean Hersholt Humanitarian Award: Angelina Jolie

=== 6th Annual Governors Awards ===
The Academy held its 6th Annual Governors Awards ceremony on November 8, 2014. The following awards were presented.

- Academy Honorary Award: Jean-Claude Carrière, Hayao Miyazaki, and Maureen O'Hara
- Jean Hersholt Humanitarian Award: Harry Belafonte

=== 7th Annual Governors Awards ===
The Academy held its 7th Annual Governors Awards ceremony on November 14, 2015. Academy president Cheryl Boone Isaacs gave a speech in support of France following the November 2015 Paris attacks the day before. The following awards were presented.

- Academy Honorary Award: Spike Lee and Gena Rowlands
- Jean Hersholt Humanitarian Award: Debbie Reynolds (who did not attend the ceremony; her granddaughter Billie Lourd accepted on her behalf)

=== 8th Annual Governors Awards ===
The Academy held its 8th Annual Governors Awards ceremony on November 12, 2016, and presented the following awards:

- Academy Honorary Award: Jackie Chan, Anne V. Coates, Lynn Stalmaster and Frederick Wiseman

=== 9th Annual Governors Awards ===
The Academy held its 9th Annual Governors Awards ceremony on November 11, 2017, and presented the following awards:

- Academy Honorary Award: Agnès Varda, Charles Burnett, Donald Sutherland and Owen Roizman

=== 10th Annual Governors Awards ===
The Academy held its 10th Annual Governors Awards ceremony on November 18, 2018, and presented the following awards:

- Academy Honorary Award: Cicely Tyson, Lalo Schifrin and Marvin Levy
- Irving G. Thalberg Memorial Award: Kathleen Kennedy and Frank Marshall

=== 11th Annual Governors Awards ===
The Academy held its 11th Annual Governors Awards ceremony on October 27, 2019, and presented the following awards:

- Academy Honorary Award: David Lynch, Wes Studi, and Lina Wertmüller
- Jean Hersholt Humanitarian Award: Geena Davis

=== 12th Annual Governors Awards ===
The Academy held its 12th Annual Governors Awards ceremony on March 25, 2022. The following awards were presented:

- Academy Honorary Award: Samuel L. Jackson, Elaine May, and Liv Ullmann
- Jean Hersholt Humanitarian Award: Danny Glover

The ceremony was originally scheduled to be held on January 15, 2022, but on December 22, 2021, the AMPAS announced that due to COVID-19-related concerns (involving the widespread surge of the Omicron variant in the United States) that it had postponed the ceremony, which was rescheduled to March 25, 2022.

=== 13th Annual Governors Awards ===
The Academy held its 13th Annual Governors Awards ceremony on November 19, 2022.

- Academy Honorary Award: Peter Weir, Diane Warren and Euzhan Palcy
- Jean Hersholt Humanitarian Award: Michael J. Fox

=== 14th Annual Governors Awards ===
The Academy planned to hold its 14th Annual Governors Awards ceremony on November 18, 2023. However, on September 6, it was rescheduled to January 9, 2024, due to the 2023 Hollywood labor disputes. The ceremony was hosted by comedian John Mulaney.

- Academy Honorary Award: Angela Bassett, Mel Brooks and Carol Littleton
- Jean Hersholt Humanitarian Award: Michelle Satter

=== 15th Annual Governors Awards ===
The Academy held its 15th Annual Governors Awards ceremony on November 17, 2024. The recipients were announced on June 12, 2024. Academy Honorary Award recipient Quincy Jones died two weeks before the ceremony and his daughter Rashida Jones accepted the award on his behalf. The ceremony was hosted by actor Colman Domingo. The following awards were presented.

- Academy Honorary Award: Quincy Jones (posthumous) and Juliet Taylor
- Irving G. Thalberg Memorial Award: Barbara Broccoli and Michael G. Wilson
- Jean Hersholt Humanitarian Award: Richard Curtis

=== 16th Annual Governors Awards ===
The Academy held its 16th Annual Governors Awards ceremony on November 16, 2025. The recipients were announced on June 17, 2025.

- Academy Honorary Award: Debbie Allen, Tom Cruise and Wynn Thomas
- Jean Hersholt Humanitarian Award: Dolly Parton

=== 17th Annual Governors Awards ===
The Academy held its 17th Annual Governors Awards ceremony on November 15, 2026. The recipients were announced on June 10, 2026.

- Academy Honorary Award: Glenn Close, Floyd Norman and Ridley Scott
- Irving G. Thalberg Memorial Award: Christine Vachon and Pamela Koffler

== Associated events ==
- Academy Awards
- Academy Scientific and Technical Awards (held before or after the Academy Awards ceremony)
- Student Academy Awards
- Nicholl Fellowships in Screenwriting
