= Michelle Satter =

American film executive

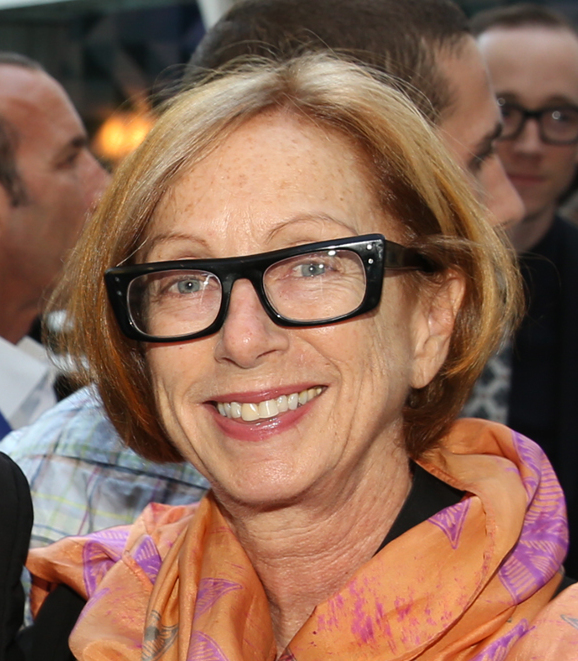
Satter in 2015

Michelle Satter is an American film executive who has been associated with the Sundance Film Festival since its foundation in 1981.

Satter founded the Sundance Institute Directors and Screenwriters Lab and currently serves as the founding senior director of the Sundance Institute's Artist Programs. She helped create the Sundance Collab digital platform to facilitate the online coordination of the filmmaker labs during the COVID-19 pandemic in the United States.

Satter received the Jean Hersholt Humanitarian Award at the 14th Annual Governors Awards of the Academy of Motion Picture Arts and Sciences (AMPAS) in November 2023. The president of AMPAS, Janet Yang, described Satter as "a pillar of the independent film community, [who] has played a vital role in the careers of countless filmmakers around the world".

In January 2025, Satter's family home was destroyed by the Palisades Fire.
