= Jean Hersholt Humanitarian Award =

Award

- Awarded for: "outstanding contributions to humanitarian causes"
- Country: United States
- Presented by: Academy of Motion Picture Arts and Sciences (AMPAS)
- First award: 1957
- Website: oscars.org/governors/hersholt

The Jean Hersholt Humanitarian Award is awarded periodically by the Academy of Motion Picture Arts and Sciences (AMPAS) at the Governors Awards ceremonies for an individual's "outstanding contributions to humanitarian causes". Prior to 2009 and in 2021, this award was presented during the main Oscars ceremony. The award category was instituted in 1956 and first awarded at the 29th Academy Awards, in March 1957. Unlike the Academy Award of Merit, the awards are restricted with the nomination and voting limited to industry professionals that are members of the Board of Governors of AMPAS.

== History ==
The award is named after Danish American screen actor and humanitarian Jean Hersholt (1886–1956), who served as president of the Motion Picture Relief Fund for 18 years. He also served as president of AMPAS from 1945 to 1949. Winners of the Jean Hersholt Humanitarian Award are presented with an Academy Award Oscar statuette. As of the 92nd Academy Awards, there have been 39 awards presented, two of which were posthumous.

== List of recipients ==
Key
†	Indicates posthumous award

Year	Image	Recipient	Nationality	Ref.
1956	Y. Frank Freeman circa 1910	Y. Frank Freeman	USA	
1957	Samuel Goldwyn in 1919	Samuel Goldwyn	Poland; USA	
1959	Bob Hope in 1978	Bob Hope	UK; USA	
1960		Sol Lesser	USA	
1961		George Seaton	USA	
1962		Steve Broidy	USA	
1965	–	Edmond L. DePatie	USA	
1966	–	George Bagnall	USA	
1967	Gregory Peck in 1948	Gregory Peck	USA	
1968	Martha Raye in the 1940s	Martha Raye	USA	
1969	George Jessel in the film Stage Door Canteen (1943)	George Jessel	USA	
1970	Frank Sinatra in Pal Joey (1957)	Frank Sinatra	USA	
1972	Rosalind Russell in 1956	Rosalind Russell	USA	
1973		Lew Wasserman	USA	
1974	Arthur B. Krim in 1962	Arthur B. Krim	USA	
1975	–	Jules C. Stein	USA	
1977	Charlton Heston in The President's Lady (1953)	Charlton Heston	USA	
1978		Leo Jaffe	USA	
1979	–	Robert Benjamin †	USA	
1981	Danny Kaye undated	Danny Kaye	USA	
1982	–	Walter Mirisch	USA	
1983		Mitchell John Frankovich	USA	
1984		David L. Wolper	USA	
1985	Charles "Buddy" Rodgers in 1929	Charles "Buddy" Rogers	USA	
1989	Howard W. Koch in 1966	Howard W. Koch	USA	
1992	Audrey Hepburn in 1956	Audrey Hepburn (Note: Hepburn was alive when the Academy voted to bestow the award, but had died by the time of the awards ceremony.) †	UK	
1992	Elizabeth Taylor in 1956	Elizabeth Taylor	USA	
1993	Paul Newman in 1963	Paul Newman	USA	
1994	Quincy Jones in 2014	Quincy Jones	USA	
2001	Arthur Hiller in 1970	Arthur Hiller	Canada	
2004	–	Roger Mayer	USA	
2006	Sherry Lansing in 2002	Sherry Lansing	USA	
2008	Jerry Lewis in 1973	Jerry Lewis	USA	
2011	Oprah Winfrey in 2014	Oprah Winfrey	USA	
2012	Jeffrey Katzenberg in 2014	Jeffrey Katzenberg	USA	
2013	Angelina Jolie in 2014	Angelina Jolie	USA	
2014	Harry Belafonte in 2011	Harry Belafonte	USA	
2015	Debbie Reynolds in 1998	Debbie Reynolds	USA	
2019	Geena Davis in 2019	Geena Davis	USA	
2021	Tyler Perry in 2016	Tyler Perry	USA	
2021	–	Motion Picture & Television Fund	USA	
2022	Danny Glover in 2014.	Danny Glover	USA	
2023	Michael J. Fox in 2020.	Michael J. Fox	Canada; USA	
2024	Michelle Satter in 2015.	Michelle Satter	USA	
2025		Richard Curtis	UK	
2026		Dolly Parton	USA	

== See also ==
- List of posthumous Academy Award winners and nominees
