= Spirit of Hope Award =

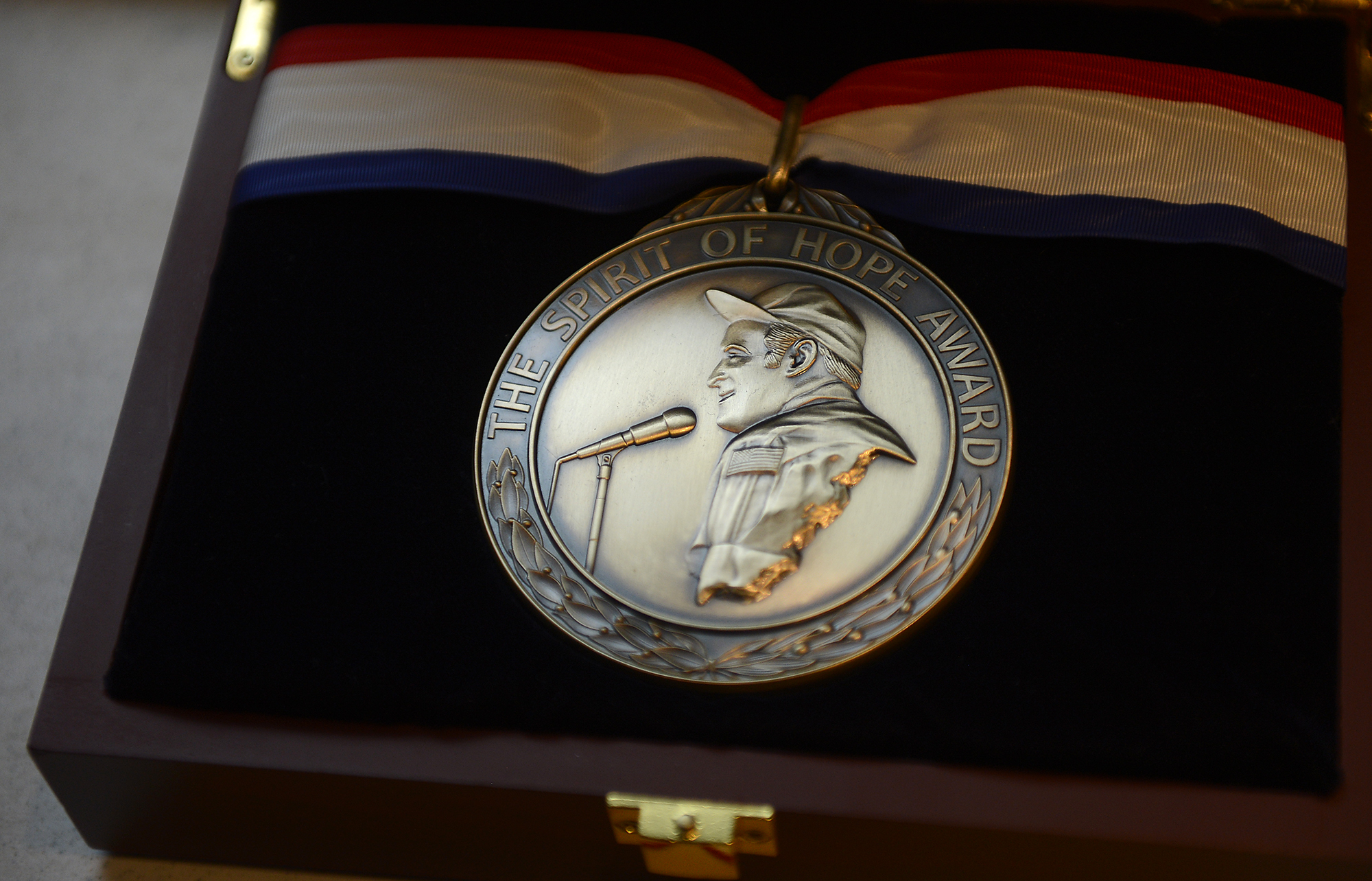
- Encased Spirit of Hope Award
- Type: U.S. military medal with neck ribbon (Decoration)
- Awarded for: "The Spirit of Hope Award is presented to individuals or organizations that embody the core values of Mr. Bob Hope, who gave generously to the military men and women for over five decades."
- Presented by: the President of the United States in the name of the U.S. Congress
- Eligibility: Both military and non-military individuals and organizations
- Status: Currently awarded
- Established: 1997
- First award: 1997

The Spirit of Hope Award is a United States military award presented by the Department of Defense. The award was created based on the contributions of entertainer Bob Hope to members of the military, and is annually awarded to individuals or organizations whose work benefits the quality of life of service members and their families.

== History ==
The Spirit of Hope Award was established in 1997 under the Clinton administration. It was first granted to entertainer Bob Hope by the United States Congress, and is awarded in his honor. The basis for the award was to recognize Hope's commitment to entertaining military service members over many decades, both within and outside of combat zones.

Originally commissioned by the USO, the bas-relief sculpture was created by St. Louis sculptor Don F. Wiegand and co-creator Mr. Michael Fagin. Michael Fagin, president of The International Group, Inc., says the piece was inspired by [null Bob Hopes] dedication to the men and women of the United States Armed Forces. "We could think of no better way to say thank you to Bob, and to all the volunteers who support and entertain American service men and women all over the world." said Fagin.

== Criteria ==
The Spirit of Hope Award is awarded to individuals who:

1. Epitomize the values of Bob Hope: duty, honor, courage, loyalty, commitment, integrity, and selfless dedication.
2. Significantly enhance the quality of life of Service members and their families serving around the world.
3. Selflessly contribute an extraordinary amount of time, talent, or resources to benefit Service members.

Furthermore, the award is presented annually to recipients nominated and selected by the Army, Navy, Air Force, Marine Corps, and the Coast Guard.

== Recipients ==
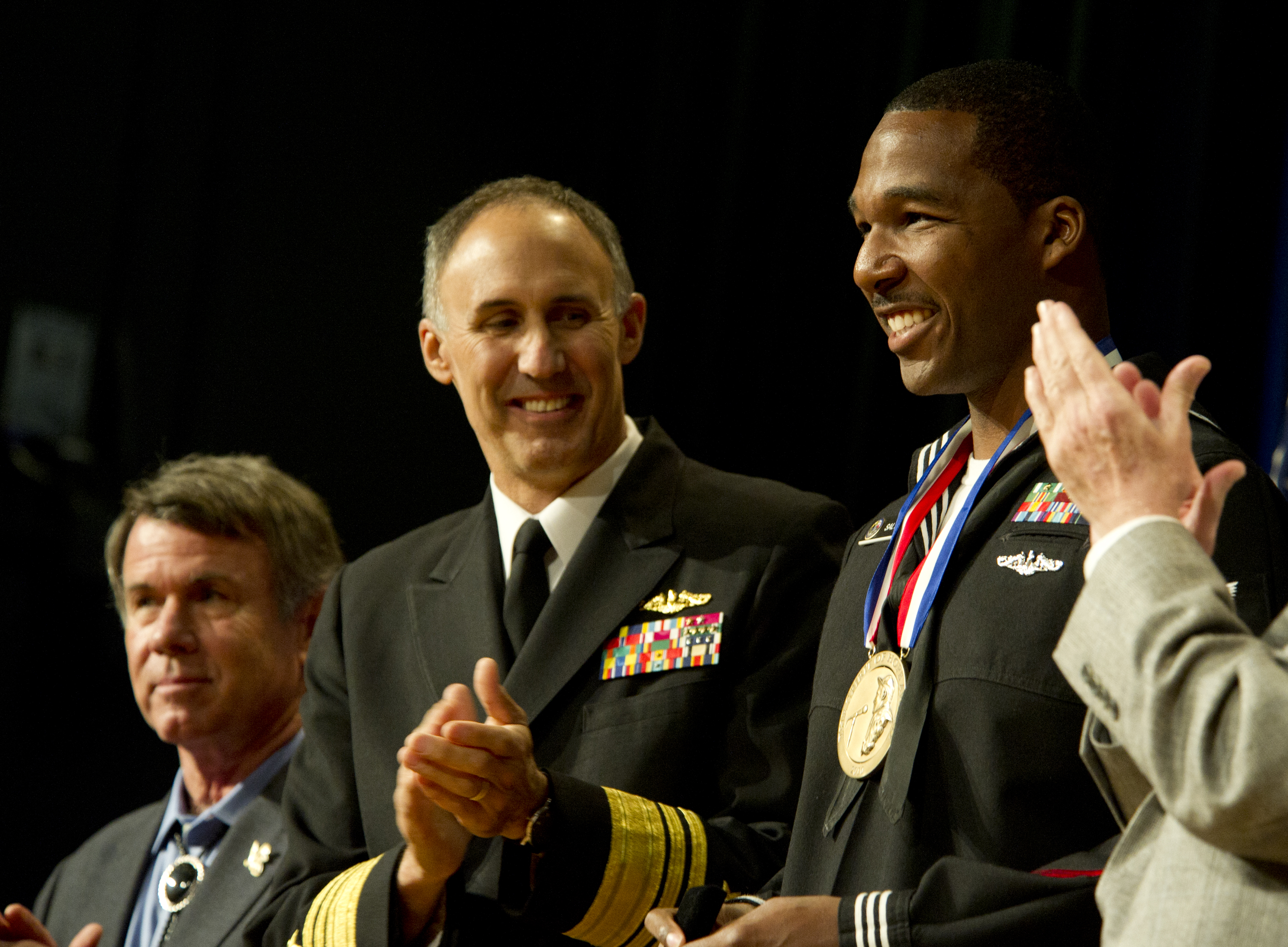
Cryptological Technician Jamar Salters, receiving the Spirit of Hope Award in 2010.

2005

- Diane Devalt (US Marine Corps)
- SSgt Jason Lerma (US Air Force)
- Sheila McNeill (US Coast Guard)

2006

- Col (ret) Robert Nett (US Army)
- James Carrier (US Navy)
- Dr. Ronald Lingle (US Marine Corps)
- SMSgt Ann Hinote (US Air Force)
- The Coast Guard Foundation (US Coast Guard)

2007

- Chaplain (Col) Lyle Metzler (US Army)
- SCPO Giovanni Balingit (US Navy)
- The Injured Marine Semper Fi Fund (US Marine Corps)
- MSgt Louis Pell (US Air Force)
- Marvin Perrett (posthumous) (US Coast Guard)

2008

- Walter White (Office of the Secretary of Defense)
- Michael Peterson (US Army)
- Cynthia Martinez (US Marine Corps)
- Nicholas Grand (US Air Force)
- The Crew of the USCGC ALERT (US Coast Guard)

2009

- The Soldiers' Angels (Office of the Secretary of Defense)
- Still Serving Veterans Association (US Army)
- Laura Froehlich (US Navy)
- Joseph Finch (US Marine Corps)
- Sew Much Comfort (US Air Force)
- AST2 Tye Coknlin (US Coast Guard)

2010

- Fisher House Foundation (Office of the Secretary of Defense)
- Camp Hope (US Army)
- Jack and Nina Baugh (US Navy)
- MSgt Chantell Hardway (US Air Force)
- Rear Admiral Stephen Rochon (US Coast Guard)

2011

- Segs4Vets (Office of the Secretary of Defense)
- Janice Bridges (US Army)
- PO Jamar Salters (US Navy)
- Ronald Katz (US Marine Corps)
- SSgt Leray Smedley (US Air Force)
- Elaine Savage (US Coast Guard)

2012

- Gary Sinise (Office of the Secretary of Defense)
- Two Top Mountain Adaptive Sports Foundation (US Army)
- Operation Gratitude (US Navy)
- Hope for the Warriors (US Marine Corps)
- MSgt Brandon Lambert (US Air Force)
- Ross Roeder (US Coast Guard)

2013

- John Barnes (Office of the Secretary of Defense)
- Wayne C. Bard (US Army)
- Jared C. Coons (US Marine Corps)
- Laura L. Baxter (US Navy)
- Matthew C. Addison (US Air Force)
- James J. Coleman, Jr. (US Coast Guard)

=== 2014 ===
- The Vigiano Group (Office of the Secretary of Defense)
- Joyce W. Massenburg (US Army)
- Marjorie L. Miller & Arthur P. Miller (US Marine Corps)
- Final Salute Incorporated (US Navy)
- TSgt Victor M. Pulido III (US Air Force)
- Robert Powers (US Coast Guard)

=== 2015 ===
- Toby Keith (Office of the Secretary of Defense)
- Dana Hinesly (US Army)
- Sandra K. Lehmkuhler (US Navy)
- Quantico Injured Military Sportsmen Association (US Marine Corps)
- TSgt Rebecca V. Martin (US Air Force)
- Suzanne Maas (US Coast Guard)

=== 2016 ===
- Kellie Pickler & Kyle Jacobs (Office of the Secretary of Defense)
- Jennifer Pritzker (US Army)
- Marc Tater (US Marine Corps)
- Horses Helping Heroes Project (US Navy)
- Timothy Bryant (US Air Force)
- Michael J. Smith (US Coast Guard)

2017

- Chef Robert Irvine (Office of the Secretary of Defense)
- Ms. Jennifer Correia (US Army)
- Mr. Jim Marshall (US Navy)
- Special Forces Home for Christmas Fund (US Marine Corps)
- Mr. Kevin Ott (US Air Force)
- Trees for Troops (US Coast Guard)

2018

- The Military Child Education Coalition (Office of the Secretary of Defense)
- Mr. Luis Cortez (US Army)
- Honored American Veterans Afield (US Navy)
- Lt. Col. Francis D. Friedman (US Marine Corps)
- Mr. Duane "Skip" Rogers (US Air Force)
- Boys and Girls Club of America (US Coast Guard)

2019

- Ms. Jennifer M. Hoyle (Office of the Secretary of Defense)
- Ms. Cindy S. Boyd (US Army)
- Ms. Vicki K. Miller (US Navy)
- Mr. Brian Bilski (US Marine Corps)
- MSgt Jorge L. Arce (US Air Force)
- Coast Guard Tactical Law Enforcement Foundation (US Coast Guard)

2022

- United Services Automobile Association Educational Foundation (Office of the Secretary of Defense)
- Lieutenant Colonel (LTC) Paulette V. Burton (US Army)
- Mrs. Jennifer A. Cross (US Navy)
- Mr. Lewis Pleasants (US Marine Corps)
- Mr. Doug McGrath (US Air Force)
- Mrs. Savannah L. Hewett (US Space Force)
- Mrs. Rachel Stevens (US Coast Guard)
