= List of Academy Awards ceremonies =

This is a list of Academy Awards ceremonies.

This list is current as of the 98th Academy Awards ceremony held on March 15, 2026.

== Venues ==
Years	Location	Notes
1927/28	The Hollywood Roosevelt Hotel (Blossom Room)	
1928/29–1929/30	The Ambassador Hotel	1928/29 at the Cocoanut Grove, 1929/30 at the Fiesta Room
1930/31	Los Angeles Biltmore (Sala D'Oro)	
1931/32–1932/33	The Ambassador Hotel (Fiesta Room)	
1934–1938	The Biltmore Hotel (Biltmore Bowl)	
1939	The Ambassador Hotel (Cocoanut Grove)	
1940–1941	The Biltmore Hotel (Biltmore Bowl)	
1942	The Ambassador Hotel (Cocoanut Grove)	
1943–1945	Grauman's Chinese Theatre	
1946–1947	Shrine Auditorium	
1948	The Academy Award Theater	
1949–1959	RKO Pantages Theatre	Hosted the Academy Awards for 11 consecutive years
1952	NBC International Theatre	
1953	NBC Center Theatre	
1954–1956	NBC Century Theatre	
1960–1967	Santa Monica Civic Auditorium	Hosted the Academy Awards for 7 consecutive years
1968–1986	Dorothy Chandler Pavilion	Hosted the Academy Awards for 19 consecutive years
1987–1988	Shrine Civic Auditorium	Alternated between the Dorothy Chandler Pavilion and the Shrine Auditorium
1989	Dorothy Chandler Pavilion	Alternated between the Dorothy Chandler Pavilion and the Shrine Auditorium
1990	Shrine Auditorium	Alternated between the Dorothy Chandler Pavilion and the Shrine Auditorium
1991–1993	Dorothy Chandler Pavilion	Alternated between the Dorothy Chandler Pavilion and the Shrine Auditorium
1994	Shrine Auditorium	Alternated between the Dorothy Chandler Pavilion and the Shrine Auditorium
1995	Dorothy Chandler Pavilion	Alternated between the Dorothy Chandler Pavilion and the Shrine Auditorium
1996–1997	Shrine Auditorium	Alternated between the Dorothy Chandler Pavilion and the Shrine Auditorium
1998	Dorothy Chandler Pavilion	Alternated between the Dorothy Chandler Pavilion and the Shrine Auditorium
1999–2000	Shrine Auditorium	Alternated between the Dorothy Chandler Pavilion and the Shrine Auditorium
2001–2028	Dolby Theatre	Formerly known as Kodak Theatre at the Hollywood & Highland Center (2001–2010); The Hollywood & Highland Center (2011)
2020/21	Los Angeles Union Station	Due to the COVID-19 pandemic, the ceremony was held primarily at Union Station and partially at the Dolby Theatre
2029 onward	Peacock Theater	

== Broadcasters ==
Years	Radio	Television	Streaming	Other	Notes
1927/28	—	—	—	—	
1928/29 to 1929/30	KNX-AM	—	—	—	1928/29: One hour of the ceremony was broadcast live 1929/30: One hour of the ceremony was broadcast live
1930/31	KHJ-AM	—	—	CBS Radio Network (only for West Coast)	45 minutes of the ceremony was broadcast live
1931/32	KECA-AM	—	—	NBC Blue Network (only for West Coast)	30 minutes of the ceremony was broadcast live
1932/33 to 1937	—	—	—	—	No broadcast
1938	KHJ-AM	—	—	—	About 12 minutes of the ceremony broadcast live, Broadcast of the ceremony was shut down after 12 minutes because KHJ did not have permission to broadcast live. The radio host was whispering the names of the winners as they were announced, out of sight in the balcony. Later in the evening, at the conclusion of the ceremony, KHJ broadcast a full announcement of winners, live from the ceremony venue, as per its original agreement with the Academy.
1939	KNX-AM	—	—	—	Announcement of winners only at the conclusion of the ceremony, live from the ceremony venue.
1940	KECA-AM	—	—	NBC Blue Network (only for West Coast)	30 minutes of the ceremony was broadcast live
1941 to 1943	KNX-AM	—	—	1941: NBC Blue Network (only for West Coast); 1943: CBS Radio Network (only for West Coast)	1941: 30 minutes of the ceremony was broadcast live. 1942: Partial broadcast. 1943: 30 minutes of the ceremony was broadcast live.
1944 to 1951	ABC Radio	—	—	—	1944: First coast-to-coast broadcast of the ceremony, First broadcast of the complete event, First ceremony in which film clips were used to introduce awards nominees.
1952 to 1959	NBC Radio	NBC	—	—	1952: First live telecast of the ceremony
1960 to 1967	ABC Radio	ABC	—	—	1966: First color broadcast of the ceremony 1967: Final live simulcast of the ceremony on the radio
1968 to 1969	—	ABC	—	—	1969: First international telecast of the ceremony
1970 to 1974	—	NBC	—	—	1971: One hour of the ceremony was broadcast live
1975 to 1977	—	ABC	—	—	
1978 to 1987	—	ABC	—	KABC-TV (Pre-show)	1978: First pre-show telecast
1988 to 1989	—	ABC	—	KABC-TV and MTV (Pre-show); Movietime (Red Carpet)	
1990 to 1994	—	ABC	—	KABC-TV and MTV (Pre-show); E! (Red Carpet)	
1995 to 2023	—	ABC	—	KABC-TV (Pre-show); E! (Red Carpet)	
2024 to 2028	—	ABC	Hulu	KABC-TV (Pre-show); E! (Red Carpet)	2024: First live streaming telecast of the ceremony
2029 onward	—	—	YouTube; YouTube TV	—	

== Ceremonies ==
Beginning with the 7th Academy Awards, held in February 1935, each year's awards are presented for films that were first shown during the full preceding calendar year from January 1 to December 31 in Los Angeles County, California. For the first five ceremonies, the eligibility period spanned twelve months from August 1 to July 31. For the 6th ceremony, held in 1934, the eligibility period lasted from August 1, 1932, to December 31, 1933. However, the 93rd Academy Awards ceremony in 2021 was an exception to this tradition, instead honoring films that were released from January 1, 2020 to February 28, the following year due to the impact of the COVID-19 pandemic.

When citing each ceremony, Academy conventions may either list the eligibility period or the year in which the ceremony was actually held.

No.	Date	Best Picture	Most-awarded film(s)	U.S. viewers (millions)	HH Rating	Host(s)	Venue	Network
1st	May 16, 1929	Wings	7th Heaven; Sunrise: A Song of Two Humans	—	—	Douglas Fairbanks	The Hollywood Roosevelt Hotel	none
2nd	April 3, 1930	The Broadway Melody	The Bridge of San Luis Rey; The Broadway Melody; Coquette; The Divine Lady; In Old Arizona; The Patriot; White Shadows in the South Seas	—	—	William C. deMille	Ambassador Hotel	KNX-AM
3rd	November 5, 1930	All Quiet on the Western Front	All Quiet on the Western Front; The Big House	—	—	Conrad Nagel	Ambassador Hotel	KNX-AM
4th	November 10, 1931	Cimarron	Cimarron	—	—	Lawrence Grant	Biltmore Hotel	KHJ-AM
5th	November 18, 1932	Grand Hotel	Bad Girl; The Champ	—	—	Lionel Barrymore; Conrad Nagel	Ambassador Hotel	KECA-AM
6th	March 16, 1934	Cavalcade	Cavalcade	—	—	Will Rogers	Ambassador Hotel	none
7th	February 27, 1935	It Happened One Night	It Happened One Night	—	—	Irvin S. Cobb	Biltmore Hotel	none
8th	March 5, 1936	Mutiny on the Bounty	The Informer	—	—	Frank Capra	Biltmore Hotel	none
9th	March 4, 1937	The Great Ziegfeld	Anthony Adverse	—	—	George Jessel	Biltmore Hotel	none
10th	March 10, 1938	The Life of Emile Zola	The Life of Emile Zola	—	—	Bob Burns	Biltmore Hotel	none
11th	February 23, 1939	You Can't Take It With You	The Adventures of Robin Hood	—	—	Frank Capra	Biltmore Hotel	KHJ-AM
12th	February 29, 1940	Gone with the Wind	Gone with the Wind (Note: Gone with the Wind won eight competitive awards, one special Oscar and one Scientific or Technical Award.)	—	—	Bob Hope	Ambassador Hotel (Cocoanut Grove)	KNX-AM
13th	February 27, 1941	Rebecca	The Thief of Bagdad	—	—	Bob Hope	Biltmore Hotel (Biltmore Bowl)	KECA-AM
14th	February 26, 1942	How Green Was My Valley	How Green Was My Valley	—	—	Bob Hope	Biltmore Hotel (Biltmore Bowl)	KNX-AM
15th	March 4, 1943	Mrs. Miniver	Mrs. Miniver	—	—	Bob Hope	Ambassador Hotel (Cocoanut Grove)	KNX-AM
16th	March 2, 1944	Casablanca	The Song of Bernadette	—	—	Jack Benny	Grauman's Chinese Theatre	KNX-AM
17th	March 15, 1945	Going My Way	Going My Way	—	—	Bob Hope; John Cromwell	Grauman's Chinese Theatre	ABC Radio
18th	March 7, 1946	The Lost Weekend	The Lost Weekend	—	—	Bob Hope; James Stewart	Grauman's Chinese Theatre	ABC Radio
19th	March 13, 1947	The Best Years of Our Lives	The Best Years of Our Lives (Note: The Best Years of Our Lives won seven competitive awards and one special Oscar for Harold Russell.)	—	—	Jack Benny	Shrine Auditorium	ABC Radio
20th	March 20, 1948	Gentleman's Agreement	Gentleman's Agreement; Miracle on 34th Street	—	—	Agnes Moorehead; Dick Powell	Shrine Auditorium	ABC Radio
21st	March 24, 1949	Hamlet	Hamlet	—	—	Robert Montgomery	The Academy Theater	ABC Radio
22nd	March 23, 1950	All the King's Men	The Heiress	—	—	Paul Douglas	Pantages Theatre	ABC Radio
23rd	March 29, 1951	All About Eve	All About Eve	—	—	Fred Astaire	Pantages Theatre	ABC Radio
24th	March 20, 1952	An American in Paris	An American in Paris; A Place in the Sun	—	—	Danny Kaye	Pantages Theatre	ABC Radio
25th	March 19, 1953	The Greatest Show on Earth	The Bad and the Beautiful	40 million	—	Bob Hope; Conrad Nagel	Pantages Theatre / NBC International Theatre	NBC Radio; NBC
26th	March 25, 1954	From Here to Eternity	From Here to Eternity	43 million	—	Donald O'Connor; Fredric March	Pantages Theatre / NBC Century Theatre	NBC Radio; NBC
27th	March 30, 1955	On the Waterfront	On the Waterfront	—	—	Bob Hope; Thelma Ritter	Pantages Theatre / NBC Century Theatre	NBC Radio; NBC
28th	March 21, 1956	Marty	Marty	—	—	Jerry Lewis; Claudette Colbert; Joseph L. Mankiewicz	Pantages Theatre / NBC Century Theatre	NBC Radio; NBC
29th	March 27, 1957	Around the World in 80 Days	Around the World in 80 Days; The King and I	—	—	Jerry Lewis; Celeste Holm	Pantages Theatre / NBC Century Theatre	NBC Radio; NBC
30th	March 26, 1958	The Bridge on the River Kwai	The Bridge on the River Kwai	—	—	Bob Hope; David Niven; James Stewart; Jack Lemmon; Rosalind Russell; Donald Duck	Pantages Theatre	NBC Radio; NBC
31st	April 6, 1959	Gigi	Gigi	—	—	Bob Hope; David Niven; Tony Randall; Mort Sahl; Laurence Olivier; Jerry Lewis	Pantages Theatre	NBC Radio; NBC
32nd	April 4, 1960	Ben-Hur	Ben-Hur	—	—	Bob Hope	Pantages Theatre	NBC Radio; NBC
33rd	April 17, 1961	The Apartment	The Apartment	—	—	Bob Hope	Santa Monica Civic Auditorium	ABC Radio; ABC
34th	April 9, 1962	West Side Story	West Side Story	—	—	Bob Hope	Santa Monica Civic Auditorium	ABC Radio; ABC
35th	April 8, 1963	Lawrence of Arabia	Lawrence of Arabia	—	—	Frank Sinatra	Santa Monica Civic Auditorium	ABC Radio; ABC
36th	April 13, 1964	Tom Jones	Cleopatra; Tom Jones	—	—	Jack Lemmon	Santa Monica Civic Auditorium	ABC Radio; ABC
37th	April 5, 1965	My Fair Lady	My Fair Lady	—	—	Bob Hope	Santa Monica Civic Auditorium	ABC Radio; ABC
38th	April 18, 1966	The Sound of Music	Doctor Zhivago; The Sound of Music	—	—	Bob Hope	Santa Monica Civic Auditorium	ABC Radio; ABC
39th	April 10, 1967	A Man for All Seasons	A Man for All Seasons	—	—	Bob Hope	Santa Monica Civic Auditorium	ABC Radio; ABC
40th	April 10, 1968	In the Heat of the Night	In the Heat of the Night	—	—	Bob Hope	Santa Monica Civic Auditorium	ABC Radio; ABC
41st	April 14, 1969	Oliver!	Oliver! (Note: Oliver! won five competitive awards and one Honorary Award.)	—	—	none	Dorothy Chandler Pavilion	ABC
42nd	April 7, 1970	Midnight Cowboy	Butch Cassidy and the Sundance Kid	—	43.40	none	Dorothy Chandler Pavilion	ABC
43rd	April 15, 1971	Patton	Patton	—	—	none	Dorothy Chandler Pavilion	NBC
44th	April 10, 1972	The French Connection	The French Connection	—	—	Helen Hayes; Alan King; Sammy Davis Jr. Jack Lemmon	Dorothy Chandler Pavilion	NBC
45th	March 27, 1973	The Godfather	Cabaret	—	—	Carol Burnett; Michael Caine; Charlton Heston; Rock Hudson	Dorothy Chandler Pavilion	NBC
46th	April 2, 1974	The Sting	The Sting	—	—	John Huston; Burt Reynolds; David Niven; Diana Ross	Dorothy Chandler Pavilion	NBC
47th	April 8, 1975	The Godfather Part II	The Godfather Part II	—	—	Sammy Davis Jr. Bob Hope; Shirley MacLaine; Frank Sinatra	Dorothy Chandler Pavilion	NBC
48th	March 29, 1976	One Flew Over the Cuckoo's Nest	One Flew Over the Cuckoo's Nest	—	—	Goldie Hawn; Gene Kelly; Walter Matthau; George Segal; Robert Shaw	Dorothy Chandler Pavilion	ABC
49th	March 28, 1977	Rocky	All the President's Men; Network	—	—	Warren Beatty; Ellen Burstyn; Jane Fonda; Richard Pryor	Dorothy Chandler Pavilion	ABC
50th	April 3, 1978	Annie Hall	Star Wars (Note: Star Wars won six competitive awards and one Special Achievement Oscar.)	48.50 million	36.30	Bob Hope	Dorothy Chandler Pavilion	ABC
51st	April 9, 1979	The Deer Hunter	The Deer Hunter	—	—	Johnny Carson	Dorothy Chandler Pavilion	ABC
52nd	April 14, 1980	Kramer vs. Kramer	Kramer vs. Kramer	—	—	Johnny Carson	Dorothy Chandler Pavilion	ABC
53rd	March 31, 1981	Ordinary People	Ordinary People	—	—	Johnny Carson	Dorothy Chandler Pavilion	ABC
54th	March 29, 1982	Chariots of Fire	Raiders of the Lost Ark	—	—	Johnny Carson	Dorothy Chandler Pavilion	ABC
55th	April 11, 1983	Gandhi	Gandhi	—	—	Liza Minnelli; Dudley Moore; Richard Pryor; Walter Matthau	Dorothy Chandler Pavilion	ABC
56th	April 9, 1984	Terms of Endearment	Terms of Endearment	—	38.00	Johnny Carson	Dorothy Chandler Pavilion	ABC
57th	March 25, 1985	Amadeus	Amadeus	—	—	Jack Lemmon	Dorothy Chandler Pavilion	ABC
58th	March 24, 1986	Out of Africa	Out of Africa	38.65 million	25.71	Alan Alda; Jane Fonda; Robin Williams	Dorothy Chandler Pavilion	ABC
59th	March 30, 1987	Platoon	Platoon	39.72 million	25.94	Chevy Chase; Goldie Hawn; Paul Hogan	Dorothy Chandler Pavilion	ABC
60th	April 11, 1988	The Last Emperor	The Last Emperor	42.04 million	27.80	Chevy Chase	Shrine Auditorium	ABC
61st	March 29, 1989	Rain Man	Rain Man; Who Framed Roger Rabbit (Note: Who Framed Roger Rabbit won three competitive awards and one special achievement award.)	42.77 million	28.41	none	Shrine Auditorium	ABC
62nd	March 26, 1990	Driving Miss Daisy	Driving Miss Daisy	40.22 million	26.42	Billy Crystal	Dorothy Chandler Pavilion	ABC
63rd	March 25, 1991	Dances with Wolves	Dances with Wolves	42.79 million	28.06	Billy Crystal	Shrine Auditorium	ABC
64th	March 30, 1992	The Silence of the Lambs	The Silence of the Lambs	44.41 million	29.80	Billy Crystal	Dorothy Chandler Pavilion	ABC
65th	March 29, 1993	Unforgiven	Unforgiven	45.74 million	31.20	Billy Crystal	Dorothy Chandler Pavilion	ABC
66th	March 21, 1994	Schindler's List	Schindler's List	46.26 million	31.86	Whoopi Goldberg	Dorothy Chandler Pavilion	ABC
67th	March 27, 1995	Forrest Gump	Forrest Gump	48.28 million	32.50	David Letterman	Shrine Auditorium	ABC
68th	March 25, 1996	Braveheart	Braveheart	44.87 million	30.26	Whoopi Goldberg	Dorothy Chandler Pavilion	ABC
69th	March 24, 1997	The English Patient	The English Patient	40.08 million	27.35	Billy Crystal	Shrine Auditorium	ABC
70th	March 23, 1998	Titanic	Titanic	55.25 million	34.86	Billy Crystal	Shrine Auditorium	ABC
71st	March 21, 1999	Shakespeare in Love	Shakespeare in Love	45.62 million	28.64	Whoopi Goldberg	Dorothy Chandler Pavilion	ABC
72nd	March 26, 2000	American Beauty	American Beauty	46.33 million	29.20	Billy Crystal	Shrine Auditorium	ABC
73rd	March 25, 2001	Gladiator	Gladiator	42.94 million	26.22	Steve Martin	Shrine Auditorium	ABC
74th	March 24, 2002	A Beautiful Mind	A Beautiful Mind; The Lord of the Rings: The Fellowship of the Ring	41.78 million	25.43	Whoopi Goldberg	Kodak Theatre (Note: Then name of the Dolby Theatre)	ABC
75th	March 23, 2003	Chicago	Chicago	33.05 million	20.40	Steve Martin	Kodak Theatre	ABC
76th	February 29, 2004	The Lord of the Rings: The Return of the King	The Lord of the Rings: The Return of the King	43.53 million	26.03	Billy Crystal	Kodak Theatre	ABC
77th	February 27, 2005	Million Dollar Baby	The Aviator	42.14 million	25.43	Chris Rock	Kodak Theatre	ABC
78th	March 5, 2006	Crash	Brokeback Mountain; Crash; King Kong; Memoirs of a Geisha	38.94 million	23.05	Jon Stewart	Kodak Theatre	ABC
79th	February 25, 2007	The Departed	The Departed	40.18 million	23.62	Ellen DeGeneres	Kodak Theatre	ABC
80th	February 24, 2008	No Country for Old Men	No Country for Old Men	32.02 million	18.68	Jon Stewart	Kodak Theatre	ABC
81st	February 22, 2009	Slumdog Millionaire	Slumdog Millionaire	36.32 million	20.59	Hugh Jackman	Kodak Theatre	ABC
82nd	March 7, 2010	The Hurt Locker	The Hurt Locker	41.71 million	23.33	Steve Martin; Alec Baldwin	Kodak Theatre	ABC
83rd	February 27, 2011	The King's Speech	Inception; The King's Speech	37.92 million	21.25	James Franco; Anne Hathaway	Kodak Theatre	ABC
84th	February 26, 2012	The Artist	The Artist; Hugo	39.34 million	22.58	Billy Crystal	Hollywood and Highland Center	ABC
85th	February 24, 2013	Argo	Life of Pi	40.38 million	23.08	Seth MacFarlane	Dolby Theatre	ABC
86th	March 2, 2014	12 Years a Slave	Gravity	43.63 million	24.60	Ellen DeGeneres	Dolby Theatre	ABC
87th	February 22, 2015	Birdman	Birdman; The Grand Budapest Hotel	37.30 million	20.65	Neil Patrick Harris	Dolby Theatre	ABC
88th	February 28, 2016	Spotlight	Mad Max: Fury Road	34.43 million	19.37	Chris Rock	Dolby Theatre	ABC
89th	February 26, 2017	Moonlight	La La Land	33.00 million	18.39	Jimmy Kimmel	Dolby Theatre	ABC
90th	March 4, 2018	The Shape of Water	The Shape of Water	26.62 million	14.87	Jimmy Kimmel	Dolby Theatre	ABC
91st	February 24, 2019	Green Book	Bohemian Rhapsody	29.56 million	16.4	none	Dolby Theatre	ABC
92nd	February 9, 2020	Parasite	Parasite	23.64 million	13.59	none	Dolby Theatre	ABC
93rd	April 25, 2021	Nomadland	Nomadland	10.40 million	5.9	none	Union Station	ABC
94th	March 27, 2022	CODA	Dune	16.62 million	9.0	Regina Hall; Amy Schumer; Wanda Sykes	Dolby Theatre	ABC
95th	March 12, 2023	Everything Everywhere All at Once	Everything Everywhere All at Once	18.70 million	9.9	Jimmy Kimmel	Dolby Theatre	ABC
96th	March 10, 2024	Oppenheimer	Oppenheimer	19.50 million	9.9	Jimmy Kimmel	Dolby Theatre	ABC
97th	March 2, 2025	Anora	Anora	19.69 million	9.1	Conan O'Brien	Dolby Theatre	ABC; Hulu
98th	March 15, 2026	One Battle After Another	One Battle After Another	17.86 million	8.9	Conan O'Brien	Dolby Theatre	ABC; Hulu
99th	March 14, 2027	TBA				Conan O'Brien	Dolby Theatre	ABC; Hulu
100th	March 5, 2028	TBA					Dolby Theatre	ABC; Hulu

== Multiple ceremonies hosted ==
The following individuals have hosted (or co-hosted) the Academy Awards ceremony on two or more occasions.

Host	Number of ceremonies
Bob Hope	19
Billy Crystal	9
Johnny Carson	5
Whoopi Goldberg	4
Jimmy Kimmel	4
Jack Lemmon	4
Jerry Lewis	3
Steve Martin	3
Conrad Nagel	3
David Niven	3
Jack Benny	2
Chevy Chase	2
Sammy Davis Jr.	2
Ellen DeGeneres	2
Jane Fonda	2
Goldie Hawn	2
Walter Matthau	2
Conan O'Brien	2
Richard Pryor	2
Chris Rock	2
Frank Sinatra	2
James Stewart	2
Jon Stewart	2

== Nominated hosts ==
The following individuals have hosted (or co-hosted) the Academy Awards ceremony on the same year in which the individual was also a nominee.

Host	Ceremony	Date	Category	Film	Result
David Niven	31st Academy Awards	April 6, 1959	Best Actor	Separate Tables	Won
Michael Caine	45th Academy Awards	March 27, 1973	Best Actor	Sleuth	Nominated
Walter Matthau	48th Academy Awards	March 29, 1976	Best Actor	The Sunshine Boys	Nominated
Paul Hogan	59th Academy Awards	March 30, 1987	Best Original Screenplay	Crocodile Dundee	Nominated
James Franco	83rd Academy Awards	February 27, 2011	Best Actor	127 Hours	Nominated
Seth MacFarlane	85th Academy Awards	February 24, 2013	Best Original Song	Ted	Nominated

== See also ==
- Academy Awards
- List of presenters of the Academy Award for Best Picture
